= List of municipal presidents of Juárez =

Head of local government in Chihuahua, Mexico

The Municipal President of Ciudad Juárez, officially the Constitutional Municipal President of Juárez (Presidente Municipal Constitucional de Juárez), is the head of local government in Juárez, a populous industrial municipality in the north of the Mexican state of Chihuahua. The office is the equivalent to a mayor. The population of the seat of the municipality (Ciudad Juárez) accounts for the majority of the municipality's population.

== List of municipal presidents of Juárez ==
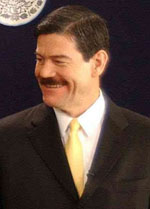
Francisco Barrio

- 1940–1941: Teófilo Borunda
- 1942–1943: Antonio J. Bermúdez
- 1944–1946: Alfredo Chávez Amparán
- 1947–1949: Carlos Villarreal
- 1950: Francisco Triana Parra
- 1950–1952: Víctor Manuel Ortíz
- 1953–1955: Pedro N. García Martínez
- 1956: Margarito Herrera López
- 1959–1959: René Mascareñas Miranda
- 1959–1962: Humberto Escobar
- 1962–1963: Félix Alonso Lugo
- 1963–1965: Aureliano González Vargas
- 1965: Felipe Dávila Baranda
- 1965–1968: Armando González Soto
- 1968–1971: Bernardo Norzagaray
- 1971–1974: Mario Jáquez Provencio
- 1974–1977: Raúl Lezama Gil
- 1977–1980: Manuel Quevedo Reyes
- 1980–1983: José Reyes Estrada
- 1983–1986: Francisco Barrio
- 1986: Miguel Agustín Corral
- 1986–1989: Jaime Bermudez Cuarón
- 1989–1992: Jesús Macías Delgado
- 1992: Carlos Ponce Torres
- 1992–1995: Francisco Villarreal Torres
- 1995–1997: Ramón Galindo Noriega
- 1997–1998: Enrique Flores Almeida
- 1998–2001: Gustavo Elizondo
- 2001–2002: José Reyes Ferriz, interim appointment following cancellation of the elections
- 2002–2004: Jesús Alfredo Delgado
- 2004–2007: Héctor Murguía Lardizábal
- 2007–2010: José Reyes Ferriz
- 2010–2013: Héctor Murguía Lardizábal, reelected
- 2013–2015: Enrique Serrano Escobar
- 2015–2016: Javier González Mocken
- 2016–2021: Héctor Armando Cabada Alvídrez
- 2021– : Cruz Pérez Cuéllar

== See also ==
- Timeline of Ciudad Juárez

== Sources ==
- Juárez, Enciclopedia de los Municipios de México, INAFED. Accessed 31 October 2008.
- [https://bivir.uacj.mx/bivir_pp/cronicas/presidentes_1951-1960.htm Presidentes Municipales de Ciudad Juárez

1951-1960], Las Bibliotecas UACJ
