= Reyes (name) =

Reyes is a Spanish word, used as a given name (unusual) or as a Spanish surname. The literal translation into English is 'kings', but could also be translated as 'royals' or 'royalty'. The Portuguese version of this surname is Reis. Similarly, the Arabic "reyes" (رئيس) signifies a ruler or head of a company or organization.

Notable people with the name include:

== Given name ==
- Reyes Estévez (born 1976), Spanish 1500 metres runner
- Reyes Maroto (born 1973), Spanish economist and politician
- Reyes Moronta (1993–2024), Dominican professional baseball pitcher
- Reyes Tamez (born 1952), Mexican immunochemist

== Surname ==
=== Arts ===
- Alfonso Reyes (1889–1959), a Mexican writer, philosopher, and diplomat
- Alisa Reyes (born 1981), an American actress
- Andre Reyes, vocalist and guitarist in the Gipsy Kings
- Aurora Reyes Flores (1908–1985), a Mexican painter
- Canut Reyes, vocalist in the Gipsy Kings
- Claudio Reyes (1960–2024), Chilean singer, actor, politician and comedian
- Coney Reyes (born 1954), Filipina actress, host, and producer
- Cristine Reyes (born 1989), a Filipina actress
- Emma Reyes (1919–2003), Colombian painter and writer
- Ernie Reyes, Jr., an American Taekwondo practitioner and actor
- Ginger Reyes (born 1980), an American rock musician
- Jesús Reyes Ferreira (1880–1977), Mexican artist and antiques/art collector and vendor
- Jorge Reyes (Argentine actor) (1907–1985)
- Jorge Reyes (Venezuelan actor) (born 1971)
- Judy Reyes (born 1968), an American actress
- Madison Reyes, (born 2002), Latin-American actress mostly known for Julie and the Phantoms
- Nicolas Reyes (born 1958), lead vocalist of the Gipsy Kings
- Patchai Reyes, vocalist and guitarist in the Gipsy Kings
- Paul Reyes, vocalist and guitarist in the Gipsy Kings
- Ron Reyes, a singer for the band Black Flag
- Sandra Reyes (1975–2024), Colombian actress
- Santa Reyes, Dominican singer-songwriter, known professionally as Santaye
- Sofía Reyes, a Mexican singer-songwriter and actress
- Teresita Reyes (1950–2025), a Chilean actress
- Xiomara Reyes, principal dancer at American Ballet Theatre

=== Politicians ===
- Edward Diego Reyes (1930–2018), Guamanian politician
- José Reyes Ferriz (born 1961), a Mexican politician, mayor of Ciudad Juárez
- José Reyes Baeza Terrazas (born 1961), a Mexican politician, governor of Chihuahua
- José Reyes Estrada Aguirre (1929–1989), a Mexican politician, mayor of Ciudad Juárez
- Juan Francisco Reyes, a Vice President of Guatemala
- Rafael Reyes (1849–1921), a president of Colombia
- Raúl Reyes (1948–2008), a leader of the Revolutionary Armed Forces of Colombia
- Silvestre Reyes (born 1944), an American politician from the state of Texas

=== Sports ===
==== General ====
- Dominick Reyes (born 1989), an American mixed martial artist
- Efren Reyes ("Bata") (born 1954), a Filipino pool player
- Faustino Reyes (born 1975), a Spanish boxer
- Mika Reyes, a Filipino volleyball player
- Norcady Reyes (born 2003), Gibraltarian international athletics competitor
- Polo Reyes (born 1984), a Mexican mixed martial artist
- Ricky Reyes (born 1978), a Cuban American professional wrestler
- Rosie Reyes (1939–2024), a Mexican tennis player
- Sammis Reyes (born 1995), Chilean-American football player

==== Football (soccer) ====
- David Reyes (born 1985), a Chilean footballer
- Diego Antonio Reyes (born 1992), a Mexican footballer
- José Antonio Reyes (José Antonio Reyes Calderón) (1983–2019), a Spanish international and Sevilla football player
- Lorenzo Reyes (born 1991), Chilean footballer
- Lorenzo Reyes (Mexican footballer) (born 1951), Mexican footballer

==== Baseball ====
- Al Reyes (born 1970), Dominican baseball pitcher
- Anthony Reyes (born 1981), American baseball pitcher
- Argenis Reyes (born 1981), Dominican baseball player
- Dennys Reyes (born 1977), Mexican baseball pitcher
- Denyi Reyes (born 1996), Dominican baseball pitcher
- Franmil Reyes (born 1995), Dominican baseball player
- Gerardo Reyes (baseball) (born 1993), Dominican baseball pitcher
- José Reyes (catcher) (born 1983), Dominican baseball catcher
- José Reyes (shortstop) (born 1983), Dominican baseball player
- Nap Reyes (1919–1995), Cuban baseball player
- Pablo Reyes (born 1993), Dominican baseball player
- Víctor Reyes (born 1994), Venezuelan baseball player

==== Basketball ====
- Chot Reyes (born 1963), Filipino basketball coach
- Jay-R Reyes, Filipino basketball player
- Jose Reyes, Filipino basketball player
- Ramón Reyes (basketball) (1907–1957), Panamanian player
- Raphael Reyes, Filipino basketball player
- Renato Reyes, Filipino basketball player
- Rob Reyes (born 1983), Filipino basketball player
- Ryan Reyes, Filipino basketball player

=== Other ===
- Alba Reyes (born 1981), beauty pageant contestant
- Bernardo Reyes (1850–1913), Mexican general
- Carlos Reyes (disambiguation), multiple people
- Cynthia Reyes, Canadian author and journalist
- Gabriel M. Reyes (1892–1952), first Filipino cardinal, former Archbishop of Manila
- Guadalupe Reyes (1918–2000), American activist
- J. B. L. Reyes (1902–1994), Associate Justice of the Philippine Supreme Court
- José Adriosola Reyes y Mariano, Filipino revolutionary
- Lina Sagaral Reyes (1961–2024), Filipino journalist
- Luz Mely Reyes (born 1967 or 1968), Venezuelan journalist, writer, and analyst
- Pedro Reyes (comedian) (1961–2015), Spanish comedian
- Ramon Reyes (born 1966), American lawyer
- Silvia Reyes (1949–2024), Spanish activist

== Fictional characters ==
- Reyes Alexander Farrow, the Son of Satan in Darynda Jones's Charley Davidson series
- Abraham Reyes, a character from the 2010 video game Red Dead Redemption
- Carlos Reyes, Austin PD patrol officer and the love interest of TK Strand in 9-1-1: Lone Star
- Cassia Reyes, protagonist of the Matched trilogy by Allie Condie
- Cecilia Reyes, a character from the Marvel comic book series X-Men
- Dante Reyes, son of Hernan Reyes and main antagonist of Fast X
- Erica Reyes, a werewolf in the MTV television series Teen Wolf
- Gabriel Reyes, playable character in the Blizzard Entertainment video game Overwatch, also known as "Reaper"
- Hugo "Hurley" Reyes, a character from the television series Lost
- Hernan Reyes, main antagonist of the 2011 action film Fast Five
- Jaime Reyes, the current Blue Beetle in DC Comics
- Joslin Reyes, a member of the Endurance Crew and Technicians in the game Tomb Raider
- Monica Reyes, a fictional FBI agent in The X-Files
- Nick Reyes, the protagonist in Call of Duty: Infinite Warfare
- Nicolas Reyes, an Antagonist and Venezuelan dictator in Season 2 of Tom Clancy's Jack Ryan
- Raven Reyes, in The 100
- Robbie Reyes, the current Ghost Rider in Marvel Comics
- Samantha Reyes, District Attorney from season 2 of Daredevil
- Stefani Reyes, the main protagonist of Final Destination Bloodlines

== See also ==
- Jessie Reyez (born 1991), Canadian singer
- Reyes (disambiguation)
- Ríos (disambiguation)
