= María Ávila Serna =

Mexican politician and lawyer

- Born: 12 March 1973 (age 53); Ciudad Juárez, Chihuahua, Mexico
- Education: Universidad Autónoma de Ciudad Juárez
- Occupations: Lawyer and politician
- Political party: Ecologist Green Party of Mexico
- Spouse: Alejandro Gloria

María Ávila Serna (Note: In this Mexican name, the surname is Ávila and the second or maternal family name is Serna.) (born 12 March 1973) is a Mexican lawyer and politician affiliated with the Ecologist Green Party of Mexico (PVEM). She has represented the third district of Chihuahua in the Chamber of Deputies on two occasions: from 2003 to 2006 and again from 2015–2018.

== Life ==
Ávila Serna obtained her law degree from the Universidad Autónoma de Ciudad Juárez and served as a clerk on the Federal Mediation and Arbitration Board No. 55 from 1997 to 2003.

In 2003, a year after joining the PVEM, Ávila joined the legislature after being elected to the Chamber of Deputies of the LIX Legislature. She sat on six commissions, including Special for Kids, Teens and Families; Care for Vulnerable Groups; and Population, Borders and Migratory Matters. In 2005, during her first term as a federal deputy, she became the president of the PVEM in Chihuahua, an office she would hold for six years.

From 2007–10 and 2013–15, Ávila served in the Chihuahua state congress (LXII and LXIV Legislatures). In her second tour of duty in the state capital, she was the coordinator of the PVEM parliamentary group in the legislature. Meanwhile, she climbed the ranks in the PVEM, becoming technical secretary from 2011 to 2014 and secretary general from 2014 to 2017.

Voters returned Ávila to San Lázaro in 2015. She is the secretary of the Northern Border Matters Commission and also serves on two other commissions, Metropolitan Development and Environment and Natural Resources. In order to return to the federal Chamber of Deputies, as specified by Article 190 of the Chihuahua state constitution, she was required to stand down as a state legislator.

== Personal ==
Ávila is married to her third husband and has four children, two from her first marriage. Two of her previous spouses were assassinated, in 2002 and 2005.

== Notes ==
Political offices
Preceded by Carlos Borunda Zaragoza	Federal Deputy for the Third Federal Electoral District of Chihuahua; 2003–2006	Succeeded by Cruz Pérez Cuéllar
Preceded by Carlos Angulo Parra	Federal Deputy for the Third Federal Electoral District of Chihuahua; 2015–2018	Incumbent
