= Serna (disambiguation) =

Serna is a village development committee in Nepal.

Serna may also refer to:

- Serna (surname)
- Serna-class landing craft, a series of Russian landing craft

== See also ==
- La Serna (disambiguation)
- de la Serna, a surname
- Šernas, a surname
