= Cuellar (surname) =

Spanish family name

Cuellar or Cuéllar is a Spanish surname derived from Cuéllar, a town in the Segovia province of Spain.

== Notable persons ==
=== Artists and academics ===
- Erika Cuéllar (born 1978), Bolivian biologist
- José Cuéllar (1941–2026), American anthropologist and musician
- Juan de Cuéllar, Spanish pharmacologist
- Nicolás Cuéllar (1927–2010), Mexican painter
- Yalo Cuéllar (born 1963), Bolivian composer and musician
- José Tomás de Cuéllar (1830–1894), poet, playwright, and novelist

=== Politicians and officials ===
- Angelica Guerrero-Cuellar, American politician
- Francisco de Cuellar, Spanish sea captain
- Henry Cuellar, member of the United States House of Representatives
- Javier Pérez de Cuéllar (1920–2020), Peruvian diplomat
- Juana Rangel de Cuéllar, Spanish conquistador
- Luis Francisco Cuéllar (1940–2009), Colombian politician
- Marcela Pérez de Cuéllar (1933–2013), Peruvian philanthropist and UN "first lady"
- Renato Cuellar, member of the Texas House of Representatives
- Savina Cuéllar, Bolivian politician

=== Sports players and coaches ===
- Ángel Cuéllar, Spanish former footballer
- Bobby Cuellar, American pitching coach
- Carlos Cuéllar, Spanish footballer
- David Cuéllar, Spanish footballer
- Diego Cuéllar, Chilean footballer
- Fabián Cuéllar, Colombian footballer
- Fernando Cuellar, Peruvian footballer
- Gustavo Cuéllar, Colombian footballer
- Hugo Alcaraz-Cuellar, Mexican footballer
- Iván Cuéllar, Spanish footballer
- Jesus Cuellar, Argentine boxer
- Leonardo Cuéllar, Mexican former footballer
- Miguel Ángel Cuéllar, Paraguayan footballer
- Miguel Cuéllar, Colombian chess master
- Mike Cuellar (1937–2010), Cuban baseball player
- Pablo Cuéllar, Panamanian chess master
- Renae Cuéllar, Mexican–American footballer
- Jaume Cuéllar, Spanish footballer

== Gallery ==
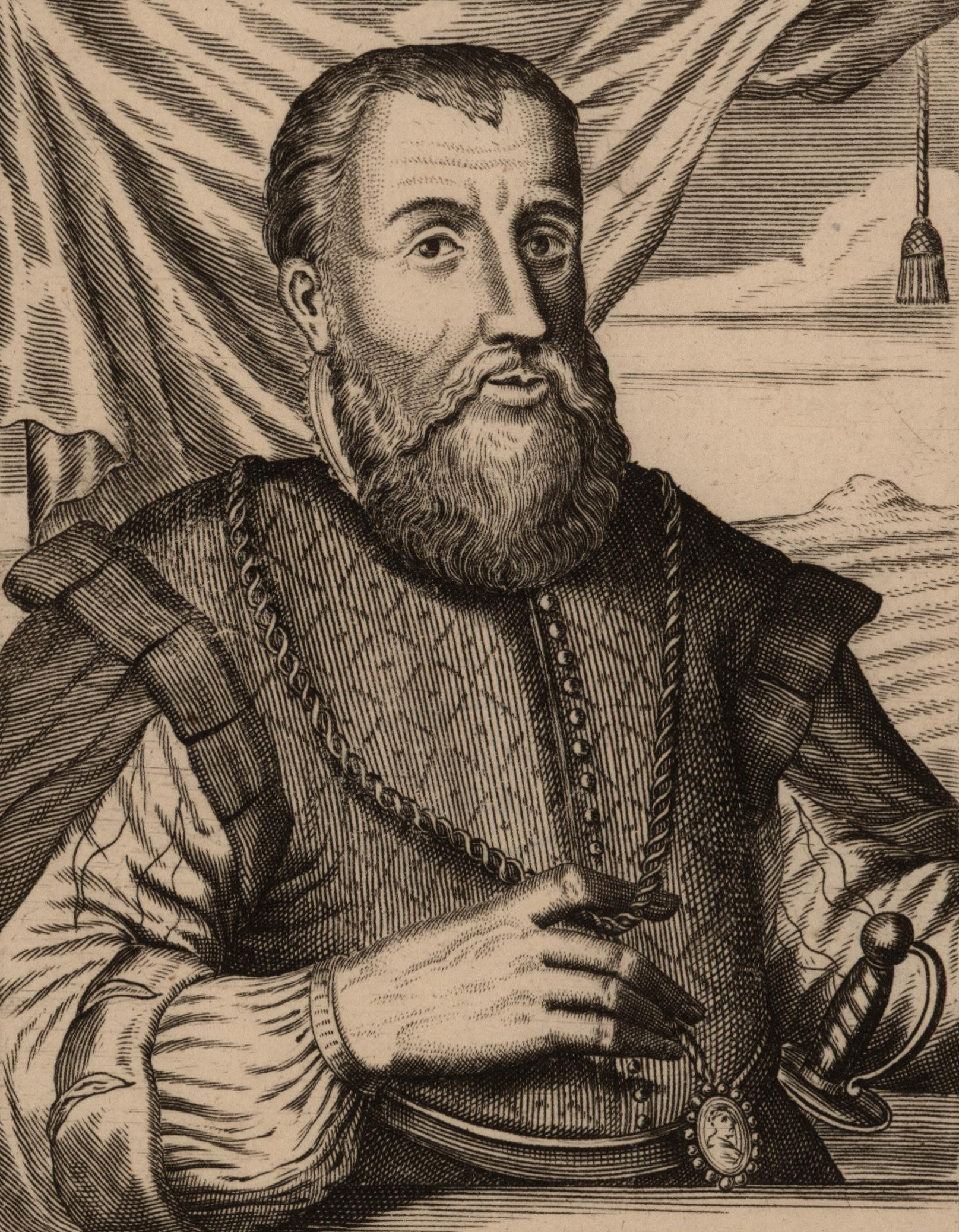
Diego Velázquez de Cuéllar (1465–1524) was a Spanish conquistador and first governor of Cuba.

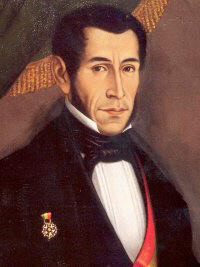
Mariano Enrique Calvo Cuellar (1782–1842) was the president of Bolivia.

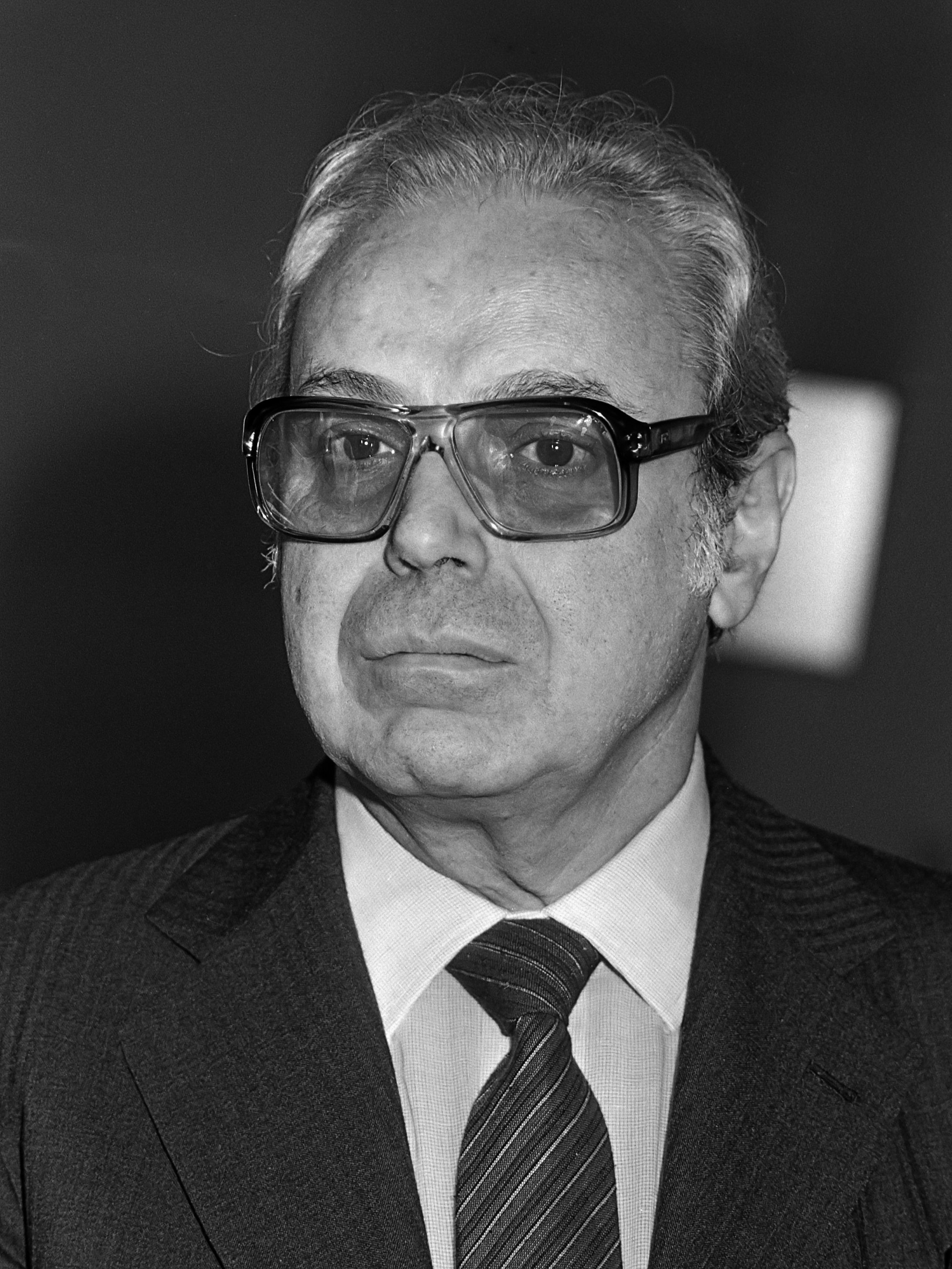
Javier Pérez de Cuéllar (1920–2020), a Peruvian diplomat, served as the fifth secretary-general of the United Nations.

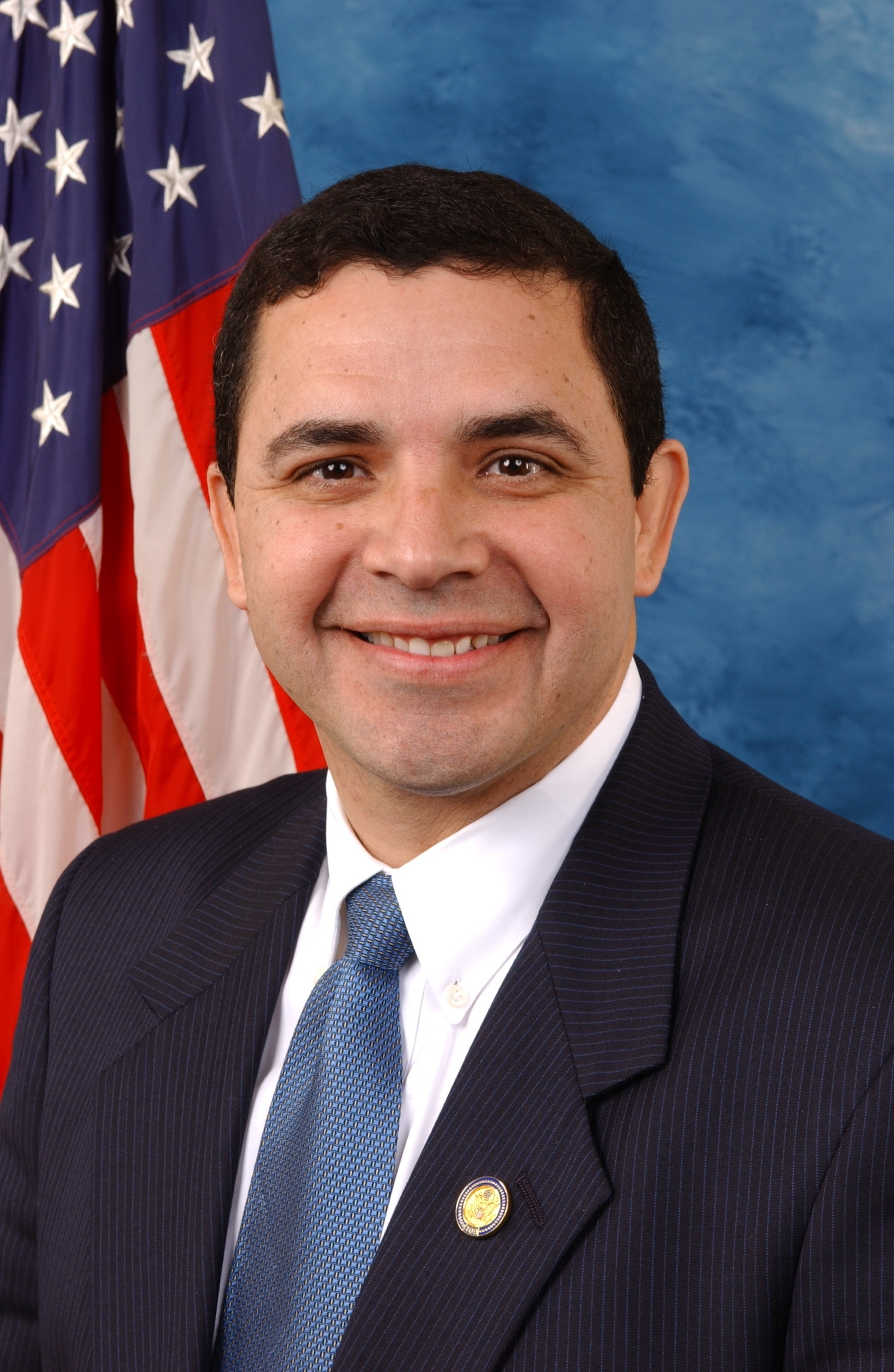
Henry Cuellar, U.S. representative for Texas's 28th congressional district.

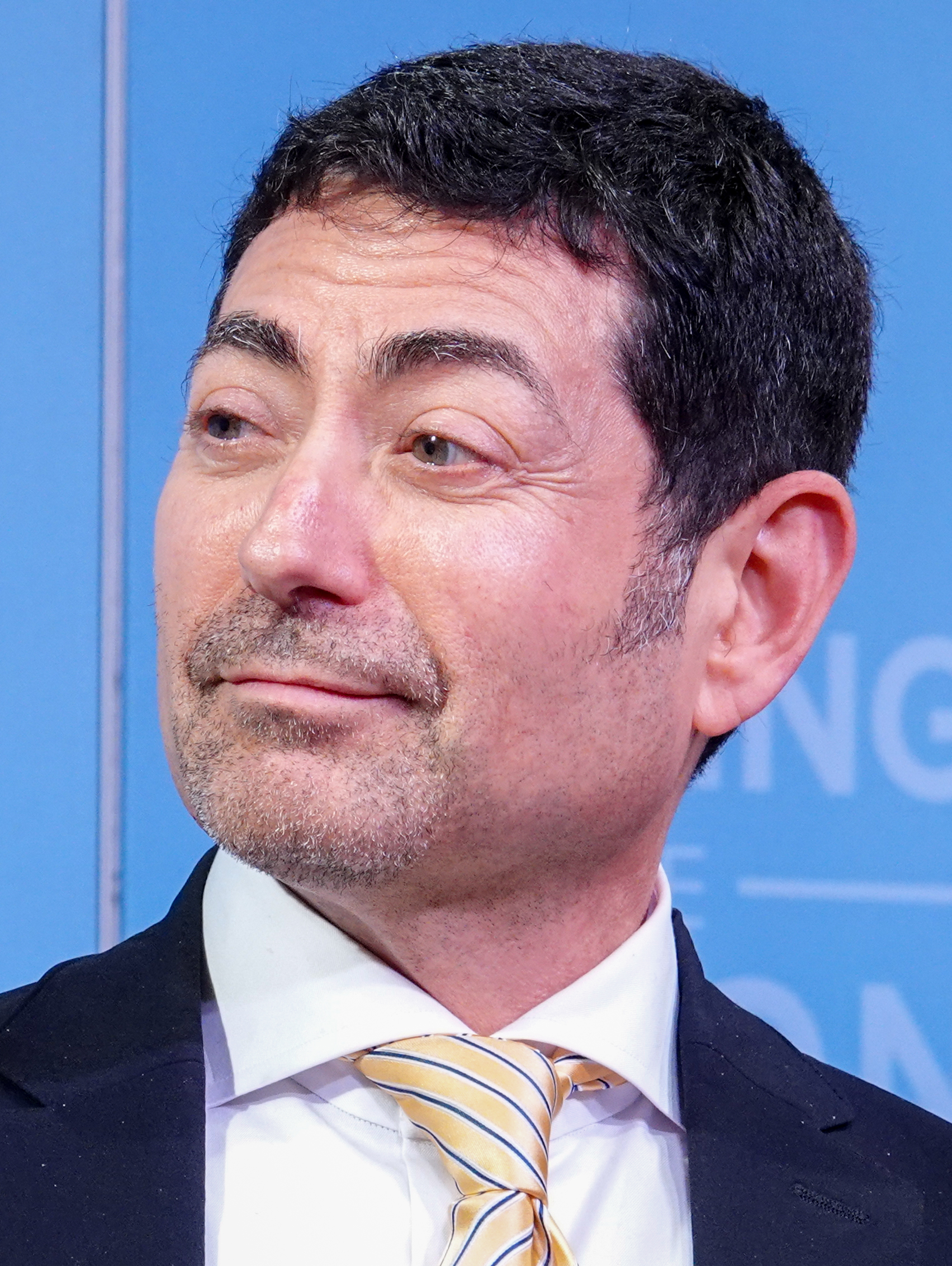
Mariano-Florentino Cuéllar was an associate justice of the Supreme Court of California, and official in the Clinton and Obama administrations.
