= Adriana Terrazas Porras =

Mexican politician

- Born: 26 March 1966 (age 60); Ciudad Juárez, Chihuahua, Mexico
- Occupation: Politician
- Political party: Institutional Revolutionary Party

Adriana Terrazas Porras (born 26 March 1966) is a Mexican politician from the Institutional Revolutionary Party. She has represented the fourth district of Chihuahua in the Chamber of Deputies twice: from 2009 to 2012, and again from 2015 to 2018.

== Life ==
Terrazas was born in Ciudad Juárez and received her undergraduate degree in Preschool Education from the Universidad Autónoma de Ciudad Juárez. Not long after, she began working in the city government. From 1987 to 1989, she simultaneously served as coordinator of the Material Resources Department of the Head Clerk of Ciudad Juárez and as financial resources coordinator for the ISSSTE hospital in the city, where she was then promoted to coordinate material resources from 1990 to 1991; around this time, she also worked for the national PRI as a state information manager. Her political career took a lull between 1992 and 1995, when she pursued (and abandoned) a degree in public administration, but she returned to the ISSSTE in 1995 as the Director of Child Well-Being and Development. In 2001, she made a failed run for the state congress; after she lost, she went back to the city as Director of Municipal Commerce.

From 2002 to 2004, Terrazas sat on the Ciudad Juárez city council, a position she left in 2004 to work at the Municipal Urbanization System.

=== Legislative career ===
After being an unused alternate federal deputy for the LX Legislature, Terrazas finally won a seat when she was elected to the LXII Legislature of Chihuahua from 2007 to 2009. She left that seat when voters sent her to the federal Chamber of Deputies for the LXI Legislature. She was the secretary of two commissions, Citizen Participation and a special commission dealing with femicides, and she also sat on the Social Development Commission and the Population, Borders and Migratory Matters Commission. Simultaneously with her legislative career, Terrazas served as director general of the municipal parking system in Ciudad Juárez (2007–08) and as the director general of Forests and Community Centers (2008–10). Additionally, between 2011 and 2013, she was the municipal president of the PRI in Juárez.

For the LXII Legislature and part of the LXIII Legislature, Terrazas was an alternate senator. She was called upon to serve in the Senate for a time in 2015, to replace Liliana Merodio; she had to ask for license to temporarily leave the Chamber of Deputies to do this.

After two years serving as the director general of social development in Juárez, voters in the fourth district sent Terrazas back to San Lázaro for the LXIII Legislature, with more than double the votes of her PAN rival. She is a secretary on the Northern Border Matters and Social Development Commissions and also sits on the Health Commission.

In March 2016, Terrazas was tapped to run the gubernatorial campaign of Enrique Serrano Escobar, once again asking for license to temporarily leave the Chamber of Deputies.
