= 2nd federal electoral district of Chihuahua =

Federal electoral district of Mexico

Chihuahua's 2nd
- Electoral district of the Chamber of Deputies of Mexico

- Chihuahua's 2nd district since 2022

Incumbent
- Member: Maité Vargas Meraz
- Party: ▌Morena
- Congress: 66th (2024–2027)

District
- State: Chihuahua
- Head town: Ciudad Juárez
- Coordinates: 31°44′N 106°29′W
- Covers: Ahumada, Guadalupe, Juárez (part), Práxedis G. Guerrero
- PR region: First
- Precincts: 307
- Population: 400,026 (2020 census)

2nd district in 2017–2022

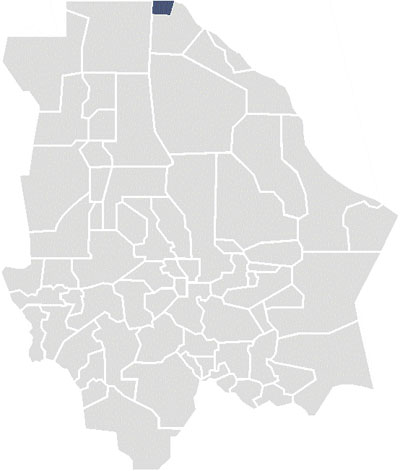
2nd district in 2005–2017

The 2nd federal electoral district of Chihuahua (Spanish: Distrito electoral federal 02 de Chihuahua) is one of the 300 electoral districts into which Mexico is divided for elections to the federal Chamber of Deputies and one of nine such districts in the state of Chihuahua.

It elects one deputy to the lower house of Congress for each three-year legislative session by means of the first-past-the-post system. Votes cast in the district also count towards the calculation of proportional representation ("plurinominal") deputies elected from the first region.

The current member for the district, re-elected in the 2024 general election, is Teresita de Jesús Vargas Meraz of the National Regeneration Movement (Morena).

== District territory ==
Under the 2023 districting plan adopted by the National Electoral Institute (INE), which is to be used for the 2024, 2027 and 2030 federal elections, the 2nd district covers the south of Ciudad Juárez and the adjacent municipalities of Ahumada, Guadalupe and Práxedis G. Guerrero, for a total of 307 electoral precincts (secciones electorales). (Note: The remainder of the municipality of Juárez is assigned to the 1st, 3rd and 4th districts.)

The head town (cabecera distrital), where results from individual polling stations are gathered together and tallied, is the city of Ciudad Juárez. The district reported a population of 400,026 in the 2020 census.

== Previous districting schemes ==
Evolution of electoral district numbers
	1974	1978	1996	2005	2017	2023
Chihuahua	6	10	9	9	9	9
Chamber of Deputies	196	300				

2017–2022

Between 2017 and 2022 the district comprised the municipalities of Ahumada, Ascensión, Buenaventura, Casas Grandes, Galeana, Guadalupe, Ignacio Zaragoza, Janos, Nuevo Casas Grandes and Práxedis G. Guerrero, together with the south of the municipality of Juárez and the southern portion of Ciudad Juárez.

2005–2017

Under the 2005 districting scheme, the 2nd district covered the western portion of Ciudad Juárez and of the surrounding municipality of Juárez.The head town was Ciudad Juárez.

1996–2005

Chihuahua lost its 10th district in the 1996 redistricting process. The 2nd district was relocated to the north of the state, with almost exactly the same configuration as in 2005–2017 plan.

1978–1996

The districting scheme in force from 1978 to 1996 was the result of the 1977 electoral reforms, which increased the number of single-member seats in the Chamber of Deputies from 196 to 300. Under that plan, Chihuahua's seat allocation rose from six to ten. Between 1979 and 1996, the 2nd district was located in the south of the state, centred on the city of Hidalgo del Parral, an area covered by the 9th district under the 2023 scheme.

== Deputies returned to Congress ==
(Mexico) National parties
- Current
- PAN
- PRI
- PT
- PVEM
- MC
- Morena
- PAZ
- Somos
- Defunct or local only
- PLM
- PNR
- PRM
- PNM
- PP
- PPS
- PARM
- PFCRN
- CON
- PANAL
- PSD
- PES
- PES
- PRD

Chihuahua's 2nd district
Election	Deputy	Party	Term	Legislature
1916	Manuel M. Prieto		1916–1917	Constituent Congress of Querétaro
...
1964	Florentina Villalobos Chaparro (Note: Villalobos Chaparro's election for Chihuahua's 2nd in 1964 made her the PAN's first female deputy.)	National Action Party (Mexico)	1964–1967	46th Congress
1967	Pablo Picharra Esparza	Institutional Revolutionary Party	1967–1970	47th Congress
1970	Diamantina Reyes Esparza	Institutional Revolutionary Party	1970–1973	48th Congress
1973	Luis Parra Orozco	Institutional Revolutionary Party	1973–1976	49th Congress
1976	Oswaldo Rodríguez González	Institutional Revolutionary Party	1976–1979	50th Congress
1979	Jesús Chávez Baeza	Institutional Revolutionary Party	1979–1982	51st Congress
1982	Alfonso Cereceros Peña	Institutional Revolutionary Party	1982–1985	52nd Congress
1985	Jacinto Gómez Pasillas	Institutional Revolutionary Party	1985–1988	53rd Congress
1988	Rafael Chávez Rodríguez	Institutional Revolutionary Party	1988–1991	54th Congress
1991	Edmundo Chacón Rodríguez	Institutional Revolutionary Party	1991–1994	55th Congress
1994	Alfredo Amaya Medina	Institutional Revolutionary Party	1994–1997	56th Congress
1997	Adalberto Balderrama	National Action Party (Mexico)	1997–2000	57th Congress
2000	David Rodríguez Torres	National Action Party (Mexico)	2000–2003	58th Congress
2003	Nora Yú Hernández	Institutional Revolutionary Party	2003–2006	59th Congress
2006	Lilia Merodio Reza	Institutional Revolutionary Party	2006–2009	60th Congress
2009	Héctor Murguía Lardizábal (Note: Murguía Lardizábal resigned his seat on 9 March 2010.); Georgina Zapata Lucero	Institutional Revolutionary Party	2009–2010; 2010–2012	61st Congress
2012	Ignacio Duarte Murillo	Institutional Revolutionary Party	2012–2015	62nd Congress
2015	Georgina Zapata Lucero	Institutional Revolutionary Party	2015–2018	63rd Congress
2018	Maité Vargas Meraz	National Regeneration Movement	2018–2021	64th Congress
2021	Maité Vargas Meraz	National Regeneration Movement	2021–2024	65th Congress
2024	Maité Vargas Meraz	National Regeneration Movement	2024–2027	66th Congress

=== Congressional results ===
The corresponding page on the Spanish-language Wikipedia contains full electoral results from 1964 to 2021.

== Presidential elections ==
Chihuahua's 2nd district
Election	District won by	Party or coalition	%
2018	Andrés Manuel López Obrador	Juntos Haremos Historia	52.1247
2024	Claudia Sheinbaum Pardo	Sigamos Haciendo Historia	81.4016
