= 3rd federal electoral district of Chihuahua =

Federal electoral district of Mexico

Chihuahua's 3rd
- Electoral district of the Chamber of Deputies of Mexico

- Chihuahua's 3rd district since 2022

Incumbent
- Member: Lilia Aguilar Gil
- Party: ▌Labour Party
- Congress: 66th (2024–2027)

District
- State: Chihuahua
- Head town: Ciudad Juárez
- Coordinates: 31°44′N 106°29′W
- Covers: Juárez (part), Ascensión, Janos
- PR region: First
- Precincts: 366
- Population: 417,486 (2020 census)

3rd district in 2017–2022

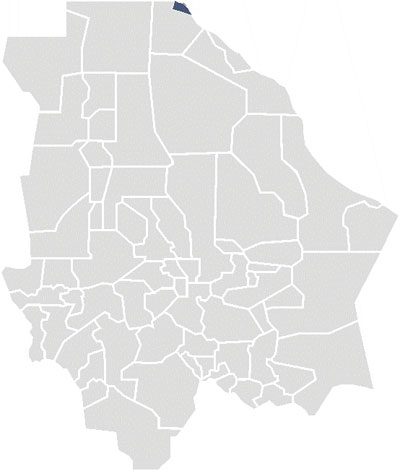
3rd district in 2005–2017

The 3rd federal electoral district of Chihuahua (Spanish: Distrito electoral federal 03 de Chihuahua) is one of the 300 electoral districts into which Mexico is divided for elections to the federal Chamber of Deputies and one of nine such districts in the state of Chihuahua.

It elects one deputy to the lower house of Congress for each three-year legislative session by means of the first-past-the-post system. Votes cast in the district also count towards the calculation of proportional representation ("plurinominal") deputies elected from the first region.

The current member for the district, re-elected in the 2024 general election, is Lilia Aguilar Gil of the Labour Party (PT).

== District territory ==
Under the 2023 districting plan adopted by the National Electoral Institute (INE), which is to be used for the 2024, 2027 and 2030 federal elections, the 3rd district covers the western portion of Ciudad Juárez and the municipality of Juárez, together with the adjacent municipalities of Ascensión and Janos, for a total of 366 electoral precincts (secciones electorales). (Note: The remainder of the municipality of Juárez is assigned to the 1st, 2nd and 4th districts.)

The head town (cabecera distrital), where results from individual polling stations are gathered together and tallied, is the city of Ciudad Juárez. The district reported a population of 417,486 in the 2020 census.

== Previous districting schemes ==
Evolution of electoral district numbers
| | 1974 | 1978 | 1996 | 2005 | 2017 | 2023 |
|---|---|---|---|---|---|---|
| Chihuahua | 6 | 10 | 9 | 9 | 9 | 9 |
| Chamber of Deputies | 196 | 300 | | | | |

2017–2022

Between 2017 and 2022 the district comprised the western portions of Ciudad Juárez and the municipality of Juárez. Its head town was Ciudad Juárez.

2005–2017

Under the 2005 districting scheme, the 3rd district covered the eastern portion of Ciudad Juárez, which served as its head town.

1996–2005

Chihuahua lost its 10th district in the 1996 redistricting process. The reconfigured 3rd district covered the eastern portion of Ciudad Juárez and the southern reaches of the municipality of Juárez.

1978–1996

The districting scheme in force from 1978 to 1996 was the result of the 1977 electoral reforms, which increased the number of single-member seats in the Chamber of Deputies from 196 to 300. Under that plan, Chihuahua's seat allocation rose from six to ten. Between 1979 and 1996, the 3rd district occupied a part of Ciudad Juárez.

== Deputies returned to Congress ==
(Mexico) National parties
- Current
- PAN
- PRI
- PT
- PVEM
- MC
- Morena
- PAZ
- Somos
- Defunct or local only
- PLM
- PNR
- PRM
- PNM
- PP
- PPS
- PARM
- PFCRN
- CON
- PANAL
- PSD
- PES
- PES
- PRD

Chihuahua's 3rd district
| Election | Deputy | Party | Term | Legislature |
|---|---|---|---|---|
| 1970 | Mario Jáquez Provencio (Note: Jáquez Provencio resigned his seat in Congress upon being elected municipal president of Ciudad Juárez.); Fernando Pacheco Parra | Institutional Revolutionary Party | 1970–1971; 1971–1973 | 48th Congress |
| 1973 | Francisco Rodríguez Pérez | Institutional Revolutionary Party | 1973–1976 | 49th Congress |
| 1976 | José Reyes Estrada Aguirre | Institutional Revolutionary Party | 1976–1979 | 50th Congress |
| 1979 | René Franco Barreno | Institutional Revolutionary Party | 1979–1982 | 51st Congress |
| 1982 | Enrique Soto Izquierdo | Institutional Revolutionary Party | 1982–1985 | 52nd Congress |
| 1985 | Héctor Mejía Gutiérrez | National Action Party (Mexico) | 1985–1988 | 53rd Congress |
| 1988 | Miguel Agustín Corral | National Action Party (Mexico) | 1988–1991 | 54th Congress |
| 1991 | Carlos Morales Villalobos | Institutional Revolutionary Party | 1991–1994 | 55th Congress |
| 1994 | Sergio Vázquez Olivas | Institutional Revolutionary Party | 1994–1997 | 56th Congress |
| 1997 | Eliher Flores Prieto | National Action Party (Mexico) | 1997–2000 | 57th Congress |
| 2000 | Carlos Borunda Zaragoza | National Action Party (Mexico) | 2000–2003 | 58th Congress |
| 2003 | María Ávila Serna | | 2003–2006 | 59th Congress |
| 2006 | Cruz Pérez Cuéllar | National Action Party (Mexico) | 2006–2009 | 60th Congress |
| 2009 | María Antonieta Pérez Reyes | National Action Party (Mexico) | 2009–2012 | 61st Congress |
| 2012 | Carlos Angulo Parra | National Action Party (Mexico) | 2012–2015 | 62nd Congress |
| 2015 | María Ávila Serna | Ecologist Green Party of Mexico | 2015–2018 | 63rd Congress |
| 2018 | Claudia Elena Lastra Muñoz | Labour Party (Mexico) | 2018–2021 | 64th Congress |
| 2021 | Lilia Aguilar Gil | Labour Party (Mexico) | 2021–2024 | 65th Congress |
| 2024 | Lilia Aguilar Gil | Labour Party (Mexico) | 2024–2027 | 66th Congress |

=== Congressional results ===
The corresponding page on the Spanish-language Wikipedia contains full electoral results from 1964 to 2021.

2 July 2006 general election: Chihuahua's 3rd
| Party or Alliance | | Candidate | | Votes | Percentage |
|---|---|---|---|---|---|
| | National Action Party | ✓ | Cruz Pérez Cuéllar | 64,827 | 51.12 / 100 |
| | Alliance for Mexico (PRI, PVEM) | | Antonio Candelas Alvarado | 33,270 | 26.23 / 100 |
| | Coalition for the Good of All (PRD, PT, Convergencia) | | Juvicela Enríquez Romero | 16,766 | 13.23 / 100 |
| | New Alliance Party | | Sergio Guillermo Armendariz Díaz | 6,855 | 5.41 / 100 |
| | Social Democratic and Peasant Alternative | | Benjamín Quezada Martínez | 2,973 | 2.34 / 100 |
| ✗ | Unregistered candidates | | | 193 | 0.15 / 100 |
| ✗ | Spoilt papers | | | 1,927 | 1.52 / 100 |
| Total | | | | 126,821 | 100 / 100 |
Source: IFE.

== Presidential elections ==
Chihuahua's 3rd district
| Election | District won by | Party or coalition | % |
|---|---|---|---|
| 2018 | Andrés Manuel López Obrador | Juntos Haremos Historia | 52.8644 |
| 2024 | Claudia Sheinbaum Pardo | Sigamos Haciendo Historia | 74.5776 |
