= Miguel Agustín Corral =

Mexican politician

Miguel Agustín Corral Olivas (10 September 1949 – 4 March 2013) was a Mexican politician who was a member of the National Action Party (PAN). He served as the municipal president of Ciudad Juárez, as a local deputy in the Congress of Chihuahua, and as a federal deputy in the Chamber of Deputies.

== Biography ==
Miguel Agustín Corral was originally from Parral, Chihuahua, and came from a family militant in the Unión Nacional Sinarquista. He emigrated to Ciudad Juárez at an early age, where he soon began his militancy in the Partido Acción Nacional, standing out as one of its first leaders. In 1973, he was a candidate for federal deputy for Chihuahua's 3rd district and in 1982 for Chihuahua's 4th district, losing on both occasions against Institutional Revolutionary Party (PRI) member Francisco Rodríguez Pérez circa 1983.

Corral became municipal president of Ciudad Juárez in 1986 after Francisco Barrio left his post to run for Governor of Chihuahua. He was elected to the Chamber of Deputies for Chihuahua's 3rd district in 1988. He later served in the Congress of Chihuahua from 1995 to 1998.

Corral died on 4 March 2013 in Ciudad Juárez; he was 64 years old.
