= La Serna =

La Serna may refer to:

- La Serna, Palencia, Castile and León, Spain
- La Serna de Iguña, Cantabria, Spain
- La Serna del Monte, Community of Madrid, Spain
- La Serna High School, Whittier, California

== See also ==
- Serna (disambiguation)
- de la Serna, a surname
- Laserna, a surname
- Laserna, a neighborhood of Laguardia, Álava, Spain
- Šernas, a surname
