= Carlos Olson San Vicente =

Mexican politician

Carlos Olson San Vicente (born 29 November 1976) is a Mexican politician affiliated with the National Action Party (PAN). Since 1 September 2021, he has been a representative of the Congress of Chihuahua. From December 2020 to January 2021, he was a senator of the republic representing the state of Chihuahua in the LXIV Legislature of the Congress of the Union.

== Early years ==
Carlos Alfredo Olson San Vicente was born on 29 November 1976, in the state of Chihuahua, Mexico. He studied financial engineering at the Universidad Regional del Norte (URN) from 1997 to 2002 and a master's degree in administration at the Autonomous University of Chihuahua (UACH) from 2006 to 2009. From 2004 to 2007 he held various positions within the administration of the municipality of Chihuahua during the administration of Juan Blanco Zaldívar. From 2007 to 2010 he was federal delegate of the Ministry of Economy in the state of Chihuahua.

== Political career ==
In the 2018 federal elections, he was nominated as a substitute for Gustavo Madero Muñoz, candidate for senator of the state of Chihuahua for the National Action Party. In March 2020, Olson San Vicente was appointed Undersecretary of Government of the State of Chihuahua by Governor Javier Corral Jurado. He resigned from office on 7 December 2020, to take over as state senator after incumbent Gustavo Madero resigned to run as a contender for the Chihuahua gubernatorial candidacy for the National Action Party in the 2021 state election. Olson San Vicente sworn in as senator on 9 December 2020, and held office until 28 January 2021.

In 2021, he was nominated by the National Action Party as a candidate for deputy of the Congress of Chihuahua for the 17th district of the state, with headquarters in the city of Chihuahua. He held the position in the LXVII Legislature since 1 September 2021.
