= Hortencia Enríquez Ortega =

Mexican politician

- Born: 1 April 1953 (age 73); Buenaventura, Chihuahua, Mexico
- Occupation: Politician
- Political party: PRI

Hortencia Enríquez Ortega (born 1 April 1953) is a Mexican politician from the Institutional Revolutionary Party (PRI). In the 2000 general election she was elected to the Chamber of Deputies to represent the first district of Chihuahua during the 58th Congress. She had previously served in the Congress of Chihuahua from 1994 to 1997.
