= Serna (surname) =

Serna is a surname. Notable people with the name include:

- Alexis Serna (born 1985), American player of gridiron football
- Andrea Serna (born 1977), Colombian model, TV presenter, reporter, and producer
- Assumpta Serna (born 1957), Spanish actress
- Diego Serna (born 1973), Colombian footballer
- Dillon Serna (born 1994), American soccer player
- Elkin Serna, Colombian Paralympic marathon runner
- Enrique Serna, (born 1959), Mexican author and screenwriter
- Isaac Serna (born 1955), Peruvian politician
- Jared Serna (born 2002), Mexican baseball player
- Joe Serna Jr. (1939–1999), American civil rights activist and mayor of Sacramento
- Jorge Horacio Serna (born 1979), Colombian footballer
- Léa Serna (born 1999), French figure skater
- Lily Serna (born 1986), Australian mathematician and television presenter
- Magüi Serna (born 1979), Spanish tennis player
- Marcelino Serna (1896–1992), Mexican immigrant and United States Army soldier
- Marco Antonio Serna Díaz (1936–1991), Colombian herpetologist, ornithologist, and naturalist
- Maria Serna (born 1959), Spanish mathematician and computer scientist
- Mauricio Serna (born 1968), Colombian footballer
- Patricio M. Serna, New Mexican Supreme Court Justice
- Paul Serna (born 1958), American baseball player
- Pepe Serna (born 1944), American film and television actor and artist
- Ralph Serna (born 1957), American long-distance runner
- Ricardo Serna (born 1964), Spanish footballer
- Snooky Serna (born 1966), Filipina film and television actress
- Sara Serna (born 1987), Spanish footballer
- Viviana Serna (born 1990), Colombian actress and presenter

== See also ==
- Sernas
- La Serna (disambiguation)
- de la Serna
