= Octavio Fuentes Téllez =

Mexican politician

- Born: 9 October 1972 (age 53); Chihuahua, Mexico
- Occupation: Politician
- Political party: PRI

Octavio Fuentes Téllez (born 9 October 1972) is a Mexican politician from the Institutional Revolutionary Party (PRI). From 2007 to 2008 he sat in the Chamber of Deputies representing the Chihuahua's fourth district as the alternate of Víctor Valencia de los Santos.
