= Alvídrez =

Alvídrez is a surname. Notable people with the surname include:

- Héctor Armando Cabada Alvídrez (born 1968), Mexican television journalist, television anchor, and politician
- Octavio Alvídrez (fl. 2012), CEO of Fresnillo
