= Laserna =

Laserna is a surname. Notable people with the surname include:

- Antonio Laserna (1752–1823), Spanish bibliographer and writer
- Blas de Laserna (1751–1816), Spanish composer
- Mario Laserna Pinzón (1923–2013), Colombian educator and politician
- Paulo Laserna Phillips (born 1953), Colombian journalist, political scientist, television presenter and businessman
- Roberto Laserna (born 1953), Bolivian-Spanish writer and economist

== See also ==
- Laserna, a neighborhood of Laguardia, Álava, Spain
- Marquess of Laserna
- La Serna (disambiguation)
