= 1st federal electoral district of Chihuahua =

Federal electoral district of Mexico

Chihuahua's 1st
- Electoral district of the Chamber of Deputies of Mexico

- Chihuahua's 1st district since 2022

Incumbent
- Member: Daniel Murguía Lardizábal
- Party: ▌Morena
- Congress: 66th (2024–2027)

District
- State: Chihuahua
- Head town: Ciudad Juárez
- Coordinates: 31°44′N 106°29′W
- Covers: Ciudad Juárez (part)
- PR region: First
- Precincts: 266
- Population: 377,938 (2020 census)

1st district in 2017–2022

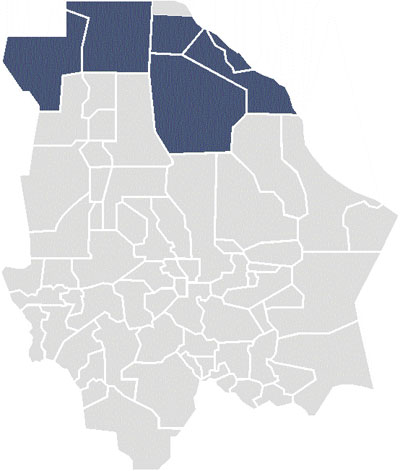
1st district in 2005–2017

The 1st federal electoral district of Chihuahua (Spanish: Distrito electoral federal 01 de Chihuahua) is one of the 300 electoral districts into which Mexico is divided for elections to the federal Chamber of Deputies and one of nine such districts in the state of Chihuahua.

It elects one deputy to the lower house of Congress for each three-year legislative session by means of the first-past-the-post system. Votes cast in the district also count towards the calculation of proportional representation ("plurinominal") deputies elected from the first region.

The current member for the district, re-elected in the 2024 general election, is Daniel Murguía Lardizábal of the National Regeneration Movement (Morena).

== District territory ==
Under the 2023 districting plan adopted by the National Electoral Institute (INE), which is to be used for the 2024, 2027 and 2030 federal elections, the 1st district covers 266 electoral precincts (secciones electorales) in the northern part of the Ciudad Juárez urban area. (Note: The remainder of Ciudad Juárez and the municipality of Juárez is assigned to the 2nd, 3rd and 4th districts.)

The head town (cabecera distrital), where results from individual polling stations are gathered together and tallied, is Ciudad Juárez. The district reported a population of 377,938 in the 2020 census.

== Previous districting schemes ==
Evolution of electoral district numbers
	1974	1978	1996	2005	2017	2023
Chihuahua	6	10	9	9	9	9
Chamber of Deputies	196	300				

2017–2022

Between 2017 and 2022, the district covered a portion of the Ciudad Juárez urban area.

2005–2017

Under the 2005 districting scheme, the district covered the municipalities of Ahumada, Ascensión, Guadalupe, Janos, Práxedis G. Guerrero and the southern part of the municipality of Juárez. The district's head town was the city of Ciudad Juárez.

1996–2005

Chihuahua lost its 10th district in the 1996 redistricting process. Between 1996 and 2005, the 1st district's territory was in the north and north-east of the state, covering the municipalities of Ahumada, Ascensión, Buenaventura, Casas Grandes, Galeana, Gómez Farías, Guadalupe, Ignacio Zaragoza, Janos, Madera, Matachí, Namiquipa, Nuevo Casas Grandes, Práxedis G. Guerrero and Temósachi; it was centred on the city of Nuevo Casas Grandes.

1979–1996

The districting scheme in force from 1978 to 1996 was the result of the 1977 electoral reforms, which increased the number of single-member seats in the Chamber of Deputies from 196 to 300. Under that plan, Chihuahua's seat allocation rose from six to ten. The 1st district was located in the centre of the state and covered a portion of the state capital, the city of Chihuahua.

== Deputies returned to Congress ==
(Mexico) National parties
- Current
- PAN
- PRI
- PT
- PVEM
- MC
- Morena
- PAZ
- Somos
- Defunct or local only
- PLM
- PNR
- PRM
- PNM
- PP
- PPS
- PARM
- PFCRN
- CON
- PANAL
- PSD
- PES
- PES
- PRD

Chihuahua's 1st district
Election	Deputy	Party	Term	Legislature
1961	Manuel Bernardo Aguirre	Institutional Revolutionary Party	1961–1964	45th Congress
1964	Saúl González Herrera	Institutional Revolutionary Party	1964–1967	46th Congress
1967	Mariano Valenzuela Ceballos	Institutional Revolutionary Party	1967–1970	47th Congress
1970	Ramiro Salas Granado	Institutional Revolutionary Party	1970–1973	48th Congress
1973	Julio Cortázar Terrazas	Institutional Revolutionary Party	1973–1976	49th Congress
1976	Alberto Ramírez Gutiérrez	Institutional Revolutionary Party	1976–1979	50th Congress
1979	Margarita Moreno Mena	Institutional Revolutionary Party	1979–1982	51st Congress
1982	Miguel Ángel Acosta Ramos	Institutional Revolutionary Party	1982–1985	52nd Congress
1985	Eduardo Turati Álvarez	National Action Party (Mexico)	1985–1988	53rd Congress
1988	David Gómez Reyes	Institutional Revolutionary Party	1988–1991	54th Congress
1991	Fernando Rodríguez Cerna	Institutional Revolutionary Party	1991–1994	55th Congress
1994	Manuel Russek Valles	Institutional Revolutionary Party	1994–1997	56th Congress
1997	Jeffrey Jones	National Action Party (Mexico)	1997–2000	57th Congress
2000	Hortencia Enríquez Ortega	Institutional Revolutionary Party	2000–2003	58th Congress
2003	José Mario Wong Pérez	Institutional Revolutionary Party	2003–2006	59th Congress
2006	Enrique Serrano Escobar	Institutional Revolutionary Party	2006–2009	60th Congress
2009	Jaime Flores Castañeda	Institutional Revolutionary Party	2009–2012	61st Congress
2012	Adriana Fuentes Téllez	Institutional Revolutionary Party	2012–2015	62nd Congress
2015	Fernando Uriarte Zazueta	Institutional Revolutionary Party	2015–2018	63rd Congress
2018	Esther Mejía Cruz	National Regeneration Movement	2018–2021	64th Congress
2021	Daniel Murguía Lardizábal	National Regeneration Movement	2021–2024	65th Congress
2024	Daniel Murguía Lardizábal	National Regeneration Movement	2024–2027	66th Congress

=== Congressional results ===
The corresponding page on the Spanish-language Wikipedia contains full electoral results from 1964 to date.

2 July 2006 general election: First district of Chihuahua
Party or Alliance		Candidate		Votes	Percentage
	National Action Party		Juan Ramón Chacón Rojo	39,391	33.16 / 100
	Alliance for Mexico (PRI, PVEM)	✓	Enrique Serrano Escobar	45,482	38.29 / 100
	Coalition for the Good of All (PRD, PT, Convergencia)		Eleazar Reyes Salazar	20,062	16.89 / 100
	New Alliance Party		José Antonio Reyes Cortez	8,023	6.75 / 100
	Social Democratic and Peasant Alternative		Claudia Silvia Alvarado Carmona	3,108	2.62 / 100
✗	Unregistered candidates			272	0.23 / 100
✗	Spoilt papers			2,451	2.06 / 100
Total				131,195	100 / 100
Source: IFE.

== Presidential elections ==
Chihuahua's 1st district
Election	District won by	Party or coalition	%
2018	Andrés Manuel López Obrador	Juntos Haremos Historia	60.5365
2024	Claudia Sheinbaum Pardo	Sigamos Haciendo Historia	74.6068
