= Georgina Zapata Lucero =

Mexican politician

- Born: 12 April 1981 (age 45); Chihuahua, Mexico
- Occupation: Politician
- Political party: PRI

Ana Georgina Zapata Lucero (born 12 April 1981) is a Mexican politician from the Institutional Revolutionary Party (PRI).

From 2010 to 2012 she sat in the Chamber of Deputies representing the second district of Chihuahua as the alternate of Héctor Murguía Lardizábal. In the 2015 mid-terms she was elected for the same district in her own right for the 2015–2018 term.
