= Miguel Lucero Palma =

Mexican politician

- Born: 30 May 1951 (age 74); Ciudad Juárez, Chihuahua, Mexico
- Occupation: Politician
- Political party: PRI

Lorenzo Miguel Lucero Palma (born 30 May 1951) is a Mexican politician affiliated with the Institutional Revolutionary Party (PRI). He has been elected to the Chamber of Deputies for the fourth district of Chihuahua on two occasions: in the 1994 general election and in the 2003 mid-terms.
