= Luis Alfredo Murguía =

Mexican politician

- Born: 22 November 1956 (age 69); Ciudad Juárez, Chihuahua, Mexico
- Occupation: Deputy
- Political party: PRI

Luis Alfredo Murguía Lardizábal (born 22 November 1956) is a Mexican politician affiliated with the Institutional Revolutionary Party (PRI). In the 2012 general election he was elected to the Chamber of Deputies to represent the fourth district of Chihuahua during the 62nd session of Congress.
