= Lilia Aguilar Gil =

Mexican politician

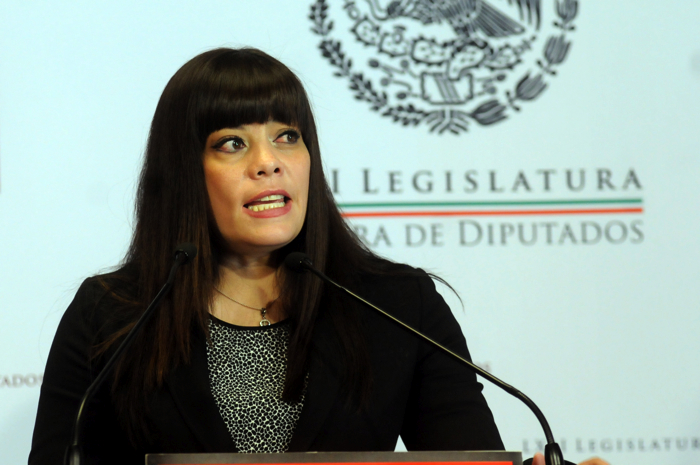

Member of the Chamber of Deputies

Personal details
- Born: 17 August 1977 (age 48)
- Party: PT
- Education: Monterrey Institute of Technology and Higher Education; Harvard Kennedy School (MPA)

Lilia Aguilar Gil (born 17 August 1977) is a Mexican politician who serves in the Chamber of Deputies as a member of the Labor Party.

== Early life and education ==
Lilia Aguilar Gil was born on 17 August 1977. She graduated from Monterrey Institute of Technology and Higher Education (ITESM) with a bachelor's degree in financial administration after attending from 1996 to 2000, and a Master's degree in applied public management after attending from 2004 to 2006. She attended the Harvard Kennedy School from 2010 to 2012, and graduated with a Master of Public Administration. During her time at Harvard she was the vice president of the Harvard Mexican Student Association.

Gil worked as a columnist for El Heraldo de Chihuahua and was a contributor to Posverdad. At the National Autonomous University of Mexico she was a professor at the Faculty of Political and Social Sciences from 2017 to 2018.

== Career ==
Gil was a founding member of the Labor Party (PT) and joined its National Executive Committee in 2000. In Chihuahua she became the state coordinator of the party in 2001. In the 60th session of the Congress of Chihuahua Gil was an advisor for the PT parliamentary group from 2002 to 2004, and an advisor for the PT in the Senate of the Republic in 2007.

During the 2006 and 2012 elections Gil was a coordinator for Andrés Manuel López Obrador's campaign in Chihuahua. She coordinated the PT's campaign in Tamaulipas and Michoacán during the 2016 election.

In the Secretariat of the Interior Gil was the head of the Social Organizations Support Unit from 2018 to 2019. During Gil's tenure in the Chamber of Deputies she has served as a member of the Government and Population, and Social Security committees. She was the chair of the Housing committee.

== Personal life ==
Gil is the mother of Leon, who is named in honour of Leon Trotsky.

== Political positions ==
In 2025, Gil condemned President Donald Trump's treatment of migrants and his inconsistent tariff policy. She wrote that raids by the United States Immigration and Customs Enforcement in California were violating basic human rights.

== Works cited ==
=== News ===
- Gil, Lilia (13 June 2025). "América violenta". El Universal. Archived from the original on 21 June 2025.
- Varela, Micaela (7 April 2025). "Lilia Aguilar, diputada: "Lo que sucedió con Cuauhtémoc Blanco es el resultado de políticos pragmatistas"". El País. Archived from the original on 21 June 2025.

=== Web ===
- "Diputada Lilia Aguilar Gil". Chamber of Deputies. Archived from the original on 21 June 2025.
