= Ascensión, Chihuahua =

Ascensión
- City

- Location in Mexico Ascensión (Mexico)
- Coordinates: 31°05′34″N 107°59′47″W
- Country: Mexico
- State: Chihuahua
- Municipality: Ascención

Population (2010)
  - Total: 13,456
- Climate: BSk

Ascensión is a city in northern Chihuahua, Mexico. Its population in the 2010 census was 13,456 inhabitants. The city is the seat of the municipality of Ascensión.

== Climate ==
Its geographic condition combined with high altitude gives a cold semi-arid climate (Köppen: BSk) with very hot summers even with elevation due to dryness of air and absence of cold clouds and winter for the location or sometimes even there are places to the north.

Climate data for Ascensión (Downtown), elevation: 1,300 metres (4,300 ft), 1951-2010 normals, extremes 1903-1980 (Note: Except snow days that correspond to normal from 1951-1980 and not combined with that of 1981-2010.)
Month	Jan	Feb	Mar	Apr	May	Jun	Jul	Aug	Sep	Oct	Nov	Dec	Year
Record high °C (°F)	28.0 (82.4)	28.0 (82.4)	34.0 (93.2)	36.0 (96.8)	40.0 (104.0)	43.0 (109.4)	42.0 (107.6)	40.0 (104.0)	38.5 (101.3)	39.0 (102.2)	31.0 (87.8)	29.0 (84.2)	43.0 (109.4)
Mean maximum °C (°F)	18.3 (64.9)	20.6 (69.1)	26.0 (78.8)	28.7 (83.7)	32.1 (89.8)	37.9 (100.2)	36.4 (97.5)	34.9 (94.8)	31.9 (89.4)	30.3 (86.5)	22.0 (71.6)	20.8 (69.4)	37.9 (100.2)
Mean daily maximum °C (°F)	15.1 (59.2)	17.7 (63.9)	20.6 (69.1)	25.2 (77.4)	29.0 (84.2)	34.9 (94.8)	34.2 (93.6)	32.7 (90.9)	30.1 (86.2)	25.8 (78.4)	19.8 (67.6)	15.6 (60.1)	25.1 (77.1)
Daily mean °C (°F)	5.8 (42.4)	7.9 (46.2)	11.3 (52.3)	15.1 (59.2)	19.3 (66.7)	25.1 (77.2)	25.9 (78.6)	24.6 (76.3)	21.8 (71.2)	16.4 (61.5)	10.1 (50.2)	6.7 (44.1)	15.8 (60.5)
Mean daily minimum °C (°F)	−3.5 (25.7)	−1.9 (28.6)	1.8 (35.2)	4.9 (40.8)	9.5 (49.1)	15.3 (59.5)	17.7 (63.9)	16.5 (61.7)	13.6 (56.5)	7.0 (44.6)	0.2 (32.4)	−2.3 (27.9)	6.6 (43.8)
Mean minimum °C (°F)	−7.2 (19.0)	−8.3 (17.1)	−0.6 (30.9)	0.0 (32.0)	7.0 (44.6)	12.1 (53.8)	14.5 (58.1)	13.0 (55.4)	11.5 (52.7)	2.0 (35.6)	−4.1 (24.6)	−7.8 (18.0)	−8.3 (17.1)
Record low °C (°F)	−20.0 (−4.0)	−17.0 (1.4)	−9.0 (15.8)	−8.5 (16.7)	−2.5 (27.5)	−9.0 (15.8)	10.0 (50.0)	3.0 (37.4)	2.0 (35.6)	−17.0 (1.4)	−15.0 (5.0)	−20.0 (−4.0)	−20.0 (−4.0)
Average precipitation mm (inches)	8.7 (0.34)	9.0 (0.35)	5.0 (0.20)	2.6 (0.10)	5.5 (0.22)	7.3 (0.29)	66.6 (2.62)	52.0 (2.05)	40.6 (1.60)	13.0 (0.51)	4.7 (0.19)	8.0 (0.31)	223 (8.78)
Average precipitation days (≥ 0.1 mm)	1.6	1.6	1.3	0.7	0.9	1.4	7.3	4.9	4.1	1.4	0.7	1.2	27.1
Average snowy days	0.56	0.33	0.16	0	0	0	0	0	0	0	0.33	0.41	1.79
Source 1: SMN (averages) and SMN (extremes)
Source 2: COLPOS (snow days)

== Sister City ==
Ascensión has one sister city.:

- (United States) - Mesilla, New Mexico, USA
