= Jaime Flores Castañeda =

Mexican politician

- Born: 30 April 1967 (age 59); Chihuahua, Mexico
- Occupation: Politician
- Political party: PRI

Jaime Flores Castañeda (born 30 April 1967) is a Mexican politician from the Institutional Revolutionary Party (PRI). In the 2009 mid-terms he was elected to the Chamber of Deputies to represent the first district of Chihuahua during the 61st Congress.
