= Nora Yú =

Mexican politician

- Born: Nora Elena Yú Hernández; 14 May 1954 (age 72); Ciudad Juárez, Chihuahua, Mexico
- Education: UTEP
- Occupation: Politician
- Political party: PRI

Nora Elena Yú Hernández (born 14 May 1954) is a Mexican politician affiliated with the Institutional Revolutionary Party (PRI). In the 2003 mid-terms she was elected to the Chamber of Deputies to represent the second district of Chihuahua during the 59th session of Congress.
