= José Mario Wong =

Mexican politician

- Born: 25 November 1951; Nuevo Casas Grandes, Chihuahua, Mexico
- Died: September 15, 2015 (aged 63); Chihuahua, Chihuahua, Mexico
- Occupation: Politician
- Political party: PRI

José Mario Wong Pérez (25 November 1951 – 15 September 2015) was a Mexican politician affiliated with the Institutional Revolutionary Party (PRI). In the 2003 mid-terms he was elected to the Chamber of Deputies to represent the first district of Chihuahua during the 59th Congress (2003–2006). He had previously served as municipal president of Nuevo Casas Grandes in 1998–2001.
