= Bismarck, Chihuahua =

Bismarck
- Town
- Location in Mexico
- Coordinates: 31°13′44″N 107°34′45″W
- Country: Mexico
- State: Chihuahua
- Municipality: Ascención
- Elevation: 1,274 m (4,180 ft)

Population (2010)
  - Total: 885
- Climate: BSk

Bismarck is a rural community located in Ascensión Municipality, Chihuahua, Mexico. It had a population of 885 inhabitants at the 2010 census, and is situated at an elevation of 1,274 meters above sea level.
