= Adriana Fuentes Téllez =

Mexican politician

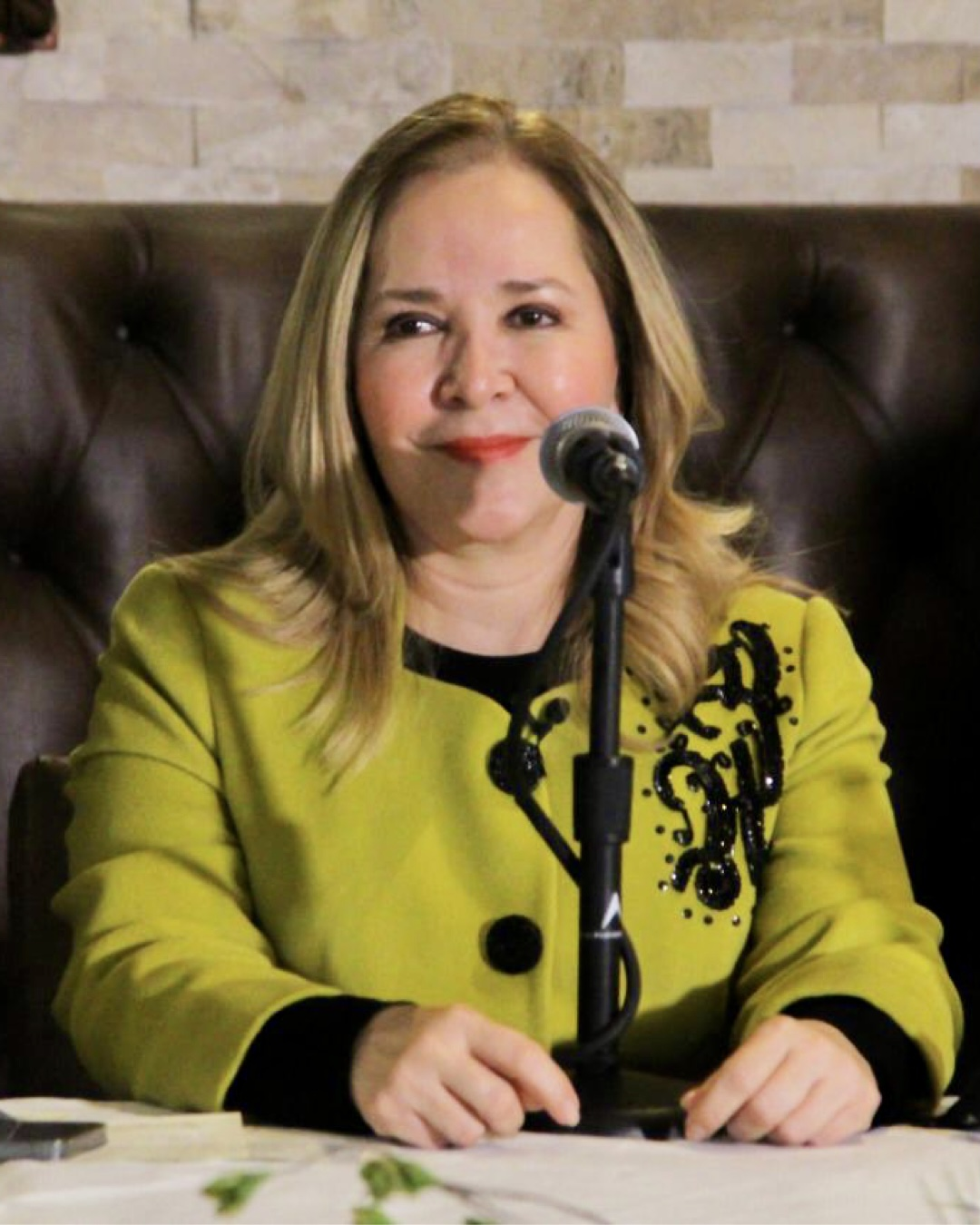
- Born: 5 March 1964 (age 62); Ciudad Juárez, Chihuahua, Mexico
- Occupation: Politician
- Political party: PRI

Adriana Fuentes Téllez (born 5 March 1960) is a Mexican politician affiliated with the Institutional Revolutionary Party (PRI). In the 2012 general election she was elected to the Chamber of Deputies to represent the first district of Chihuahua during the 62nd Congress.
