= Francisco Rodríguez Pérez =

Mexican politician (1939–2021)

President of the Chamber of Deputies of Mexico
- In office 29 July 1983 – 30 July 1983

Member of the Chamber of Deputies of Mexico
- In office 1 September 1982 – 31 August 1985
- Preceded by: Miguel Lerma Candelaria
- Succeeded by: Oscar Luis Rivas Muñoz
- Constituency: Fourth Federal Electoral District of Chihuahua
- In office 1 September 1973 – 31 August 1976
- Preceded by: Fernando Pacheco Parra
- Succeeded by: José Reyes Estrada Aguirre
- Constituency: Third Federal Electoral District of Chihuahua

Personal details
- Born: 1 June 1939; Ciudad Juárez, Chihuahua, Mexico
- Died: 11 December 2021 (aged 82); Chihuahua, Chihuahua, Mexico
- Political party: PRI

Francisco Rodríguez Pérez (1 June 1939 – 11 December 2021) was a Mexican politician. A member of the Institutional Revolutionary Party (PRI), he served in the Chamber of Deputies from 1973 to 1976 for Chihuahua's third district and again from 1982 to 1985 for Chihuahua's fourth district. During his second term in Congress he briefly served as president of the Chamber for one day in 1983.
