= José Ignacio Duarte Murillo =

Mexican politician

- Born: 9 September 1965 (age 60); Ciudad Juárez, Chihuahua, Mexico
- Education: ITESM
- Title: Contador Publico
- Political party: PRI

José Ignacio Duarte Murillo (born 9 September 1965) is a Mexican politician affiliated with the Institutional Revolutionary Party (PRI). In the 2012 general election he was elected to the Chamber of Deputies to represent Chihuahua's second district during the 62nd session of Congress.
