= José Reyes Ferriz =

Mexican politician

José Reyes Estrada Ferriz (born 23 July 1961 in Chihuahua, Chihuahua) is a Mexican politician, affiliated with the Institutional Revolutionary Party (PRI). He served as the municipal president of Ciudad Juárez, Chihuahua, from 2007 to 2010.

José Reyes Ferriz is the son of José Reyes Estrada Aguirre, who also served as Municipal President of Ciudad Juárez from 1980 to 1983. Reyes Ferriz is a law graduate from the Autonomous University of Ciudad Juárez and has a master's degree from the University of Notre Dame Law School in the United States. He has been a member of the PRI since 1984.

In 2001, following the cancellation of the local election in Ciudad Juárez, the Congress of Chihuahua appointed him to serve as the municipal president on an interim basis until a special election could be held. In 2004, Governor José Reyes Baeza Terrazas put him in charge of revenue collection in Ciudad Juárez, a position he left in 2007 to seek the PRI's candidacy for the 2007 municipal presidential election.

On 22 April 2007, Reyes Ferriz was selected as the PRI's candidate for mayor of Juárez, and on 1 July 2007 he was elected to serve as Juárez's municipal president for the 2007–10 period.

Reyes Ferriz has been brought into the national and international spotlight as drug-related violence on the Mexican–American border has escalated in 2008 and 2009. Ciudad Juárez is directly across the border from El Paso, Texas, and has been called "The Most Dangerous City in the Americas".

Preceded by Héctor Murguía Lardizábal	Municipal President of Ciudad Juárez; 2007–2010	Succeeded by Héctor "Teto" Murguía Lardizábal
Preceded by Gustavo Elizondo	Municipal President of Ciudad Juárez (interim); 2001–2002	Succeeded by Jesús Alfredo Delgado
