= Carlos Reyes =

Carlos Reyes may refer to:

- Carlos Reyes (baseball) (born 1969), United States Major League Baseball player
- Carlos Reyes (boxer), Puerto Rican boxer at the 1984 Summer Olympics
- Carlos Reyes (Chilean footballer) (born 1973), former Chilean footballer
- Carlos Reyes López (1957–2026), Mexican politician from Chihuahua
- Carlos Reyes-Manzo (born 1944), documentary photographer, photojournalist and poet from Chile
- Carlos Reyes (Uruguayan footballer) (1957–2009), Uruguayan footballer and manager
- Carlos Humberto Reyes (born 1941), Honduran trade union leader and 2009 presidential candidate
- Carlos Tomas Reyes, a main character from 9-1-1: Lone Star TV series
- Cotton Hill, a character from the King of the Hill animated series, translated as "Carlos Reyes" for Hispanic America
