= Jacinto Gómez Pasillas =

Mexican politician

Member of the Chamber of Deputies for the Chihuahua′s 2nd district
- In office 1 September 1985 – 31 August 1988
- Preceded by: Alfonso Cereceros Peña
- Succeeded by: Rafael Chávez Rodríguez

Personal details
- Born: 7 December 1940 (age 85) Chihuahua, Mexico
- Party: PANAL
- Occupation: Politician

Jacinto Gómez Pasillas (born 7 December 1940) is a Mexican politician from the New Alliance Party (PANAL). He has served two terms in the Chamber of Deputies: during the 53rd Congress (1985–1988) for Chihuahua's second district, and during the 60th Congress (2006–2009) as a plurinominal deputy.
