= Florentina Villalobos Chaparro =

Mexican politician (1931–2022)

Member of the Chamber of Deputies of Mexico
- In office 1 September 1982 – 31 August 1985
- In office 1 September 1964 – 31 August 1967
- Preceded by: José I. Aguilar Irungaray
- Succeeded by: Pablo Picharra Esparza
- Constituency: Chihuahua's 2nd district

Personal details
- Born: 27 April 1931; Parral, Chihuahua, Mexico
- Died: 10 August 2022 (aged 91); Chihuahua, Chihuahua, Mexico
- Political party: PAN
- Education: Escuela de Periodismo Carlos Septién García
- Occupation: Journalist

Florentina Villalobos Chaparro (27 April 1931 – 10 August 2022) was a Mexican politician. A member of the National Action Party (PAN), her election to the Chamber of Deputies for Chihuahua's second district in the 1964 general election made her the PAN's first female federal deputy. She was re-elected to Congress as a plurinominal deputy in the 1982 general election.

Villalobos died in the city of Chihuahua on 10 August 2022, at the age of 91.
