= Javier González Mocken =

Mexican politician (1951–2024)

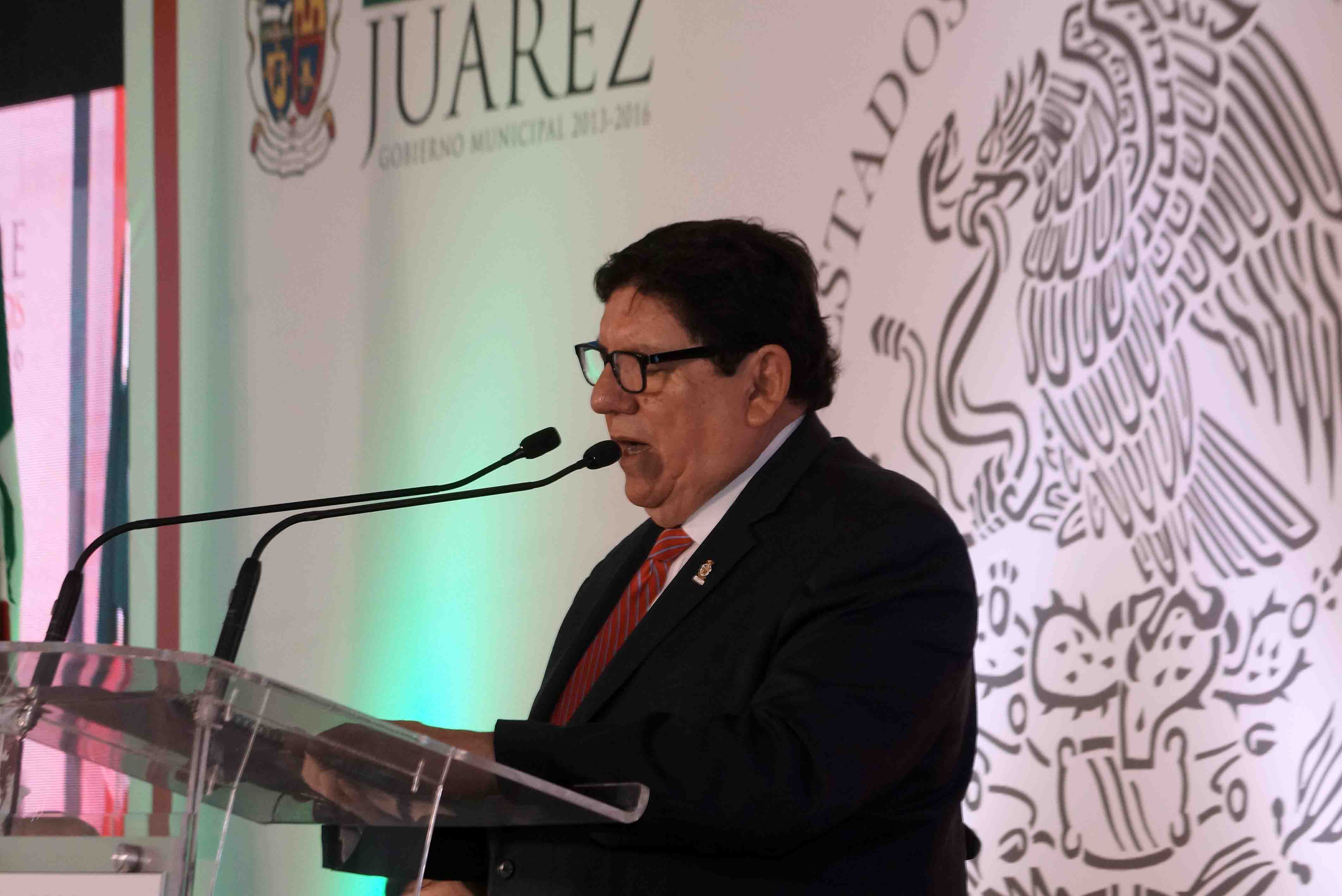
- González Mocken in 2016

Head of the Chihuahua State Human Rights Commission
- In office 15 April 2024 – 6 August 2024

Secretary of Education, Culture and Sports of Chihuahua
- In office 2021–2023
- Governor: María Eugenia Campos Galván

Mayor of Ciudad Juarez
- In office 3 December 2015 – 9 October 2016
- Preceded by: Enrique Serrano Escobar
- Succeeded by: Héctor Armando Cabada Alvídrez

Personal details
- Born: 20 March 1951 Ciudad Juárez, Chihuahua, Mexico
- Died: 6 August 2024 (aged 73) Ciudad Juárez, Chihuahua, Mexico
- Party: National Action Party
- Spouse: Eloisa Fong
- Profession: Lawyer

Javier González Mocken (20 March 1951 – 6 August 2024) was a Mexican lawyer, politician, academic, and member of the National Action Party (PAN). González served as the interim Municipal President of Ciudad Juárez, (or mayor of Ciudad Juárez), from 2015 until 2016. In April 2024, he was appointed the head of the Chihuahua State Human Rights Commission (CEDH) by the Congress of Chihuahua. He was also the director of the Institute of Social Sciences and Administration of the Universidad Autónoma de Ciudad Juárez at the time of his death in 2024.

== Biography ==
González Mocken was born in Ciudad Juárez, Chihuahua, on 20 March 1951. He graduated from the Universidad Autónoma de Ciudad Juárez, where he received a law degree in 1975 and became a lawyer.

González began his career in law as the head of the first head of the Attorney General's labor office in Ciudad Juárez from 1976 until 1980. He simultaneously served as the general director of educational outreach for his alma mater, the Universidad Autónoma de Ciudad Juárez (UACJ), from 1977 to 1978, as well as UACJ's Secretary General from 1978 to 1982. González then taught constitutional law, recurso de amparo, and other legal courses at the Universidad Autónoma de Ciudad Juárez from 1982 until 1990 as a full-time professor.

From 2009 to 2010, he was the coordinator of the office of complaints for the Chihuahua Joint Operation. He served as Undersecretary of Education, Culture and Sports for the Northern Zone of Chihuahua from 2010 to 2013.

In 2015, Javier González Mocken became acting Mayor of Ciudad Juárez when the incumbent municipal president, Enrique Serrano Escobar, left office to unsuccessfully run as the Institutional Revolutionary Party candidate for governor of Chihuahua. González served as interim mayor from 3 December 2015 until 9 October 2016. During his tenure, González hosted a reception for Pope Francis during the pontiff's visit to Ciudad Juárez and the Mexico-United States border. He also repatriated the remains of Juan Gabriel, a well-known singer from Ciudad Juárez who died in August 2016.

Javier González Mocken unsuccessfully ran twice for municipal president of Ciudad Juárez, but was not elected.

He later served as the Chihuahua state Secretary of Education, Culture and Sports under Governor María Eugenia Campos Galván from 2021 until 2023.

On 10 April 2024, González was appointed the new head of the Chihuahua State Human Rights Commission (CEDH) by the Congress of Chihuahua. His term on the CEDH began on 15 April 2024.

In July 2024, Gonzalez was hospitalized in El Paso, Texas, for treatment of a rare, respiratory lung disease. He was transferred to the Centro Médico de Especialidades in Ciudad Juárez, where he died on 6 August 2024, at the age of 73.
