= Lilia Merodio Reza =

Mexican politician

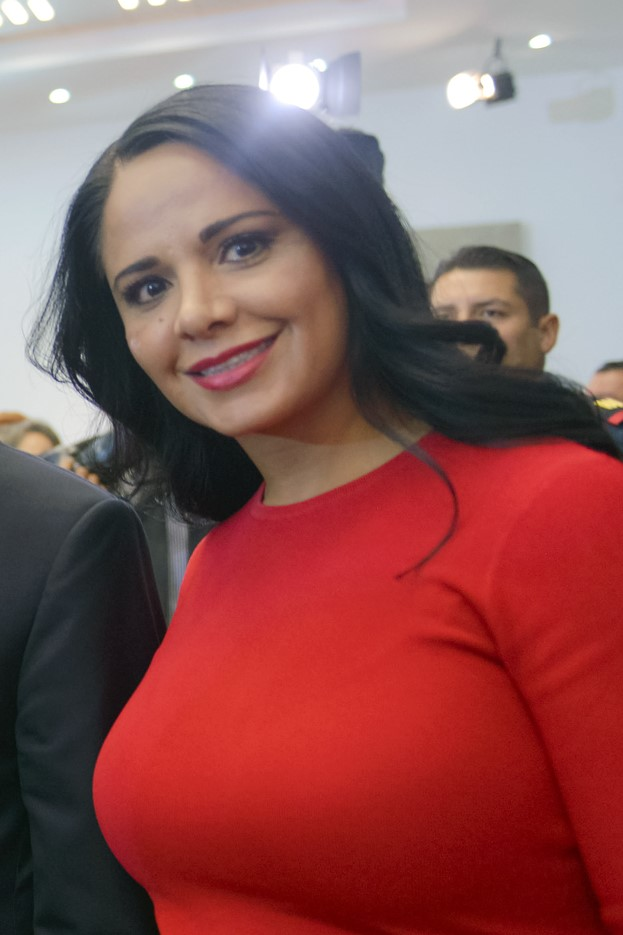

Senator of the Congress of the Union
- In office 13 January 2012 – 31 August 2018
- Constituency: Chihuahua

Deputy of the Congress of the Union
- In office 1 September 2006 – 31 August 2009
- Constituency: 2nd District of Chihuahua

Personal details
- Born: Ciudad Juárez, Chihuahua, Mexico
- Education: Universidad Autónoma de Ciudad Juárez (B.A. in Business Administration, 2001); UNAM (Master's in Law, titulación automática, with honors); Instituto Nacional de Administración Pública (México) (Ph.D. in Public Administration, in progress)
- Occupation: Politician

Lilia Merodio Reza (born 19 September 1978, Ciudad Juárez, Chihuahua) is a Mexican politician. She served as a federal deputy from 2006 to 2009 and as a senator representing Chihuahua from 2012 to 2018. Between 7 September 2021 and 13 April 2022, she served as Secretary of Rural Development of the Government of Chihuahua. In July 2023, she resigned her membership in the Institutional Revolutionary Party (PRI). Since 2023, Merodio Reza has served as Director of Political Relations at the newspaper El Universal, appointed by the Executive President Juan Francisco Ealy Ortiz.

== Education ==
Merodio Reza holds a degree in Business Administration from the Universidad Autónoma de Ciudad Juárez (UACJ). She obtained a master's degree in law at the UNAM, with her thesis approved with honors. She is currently pursuing a PhD in Public Administration at the Instituto Nacional de Administración Pública (INAP).

== Public administration career ==
She was head of the user registry of the Municipal Water and Sanitation Board of Ciudad Juárez (2001–2002); alderwoman of Ciudad Juárez (2002–2004); and Human Resources Director of the same City Hall (2004–2006). In 2010–2011 she served as representative of the Government of Chihuahua in Mexico City.

== Legislative career ==
In the 2006 elections, she was elected federal deputy for Chihuahua's 2nd District for the LX Legislature (2006–2009). During her term, she was secretary of the Board of Directors on two occasions, secretary of the Communications Commission, and member of the commissions on Gender Equity; Youth and Sports; National Defense; and Population, Borders and Migratory Affairs.

From 2012 to 2018, she was Senator of the Republic in the LXII and LXIII Legislatures, elected by relative majority. She served as secretary of the Board of Directors, chair of the Commission on Care for Vulnerable Groups; secretary of the Youth and Sports and Health commissions; and member of the commissions on Finance and Public Credit; Asia-Pacific Foreign Relations; and Communications and Transportation.

== Recent activity ==
On September 7, 2021, she was appointed Secretary of Rural Development of the Government of Chihuahua, a position she resigned from on April 13, 2022.

In 2022 she joined the Social Action Coordination of the National Executive Committee of the FSTSE. On July 6, 2023, she announced her resignation from the PRI after nearly 30 years of membership.

Since 2023, Merodio Reza has served as Director of Political Relations at the newspaper El Universal.
