= José Adriosola Reyes y Mariano =

Filipino revolutionary leader

José Adriosola Reyes y Mariano (April 24, 1864 - May 17, 1922) was a Filipino revolutionary leader.

== Biography ==
He was born on April 24, 1864, at San Rafael, Bulacan to Maximo Adriosola Reyes and Valeriana Mariano. He married Socorro Kaingal of Bulacan, a teacher in a public school. She was the first president of the Cavite Women's Club. They had seven children, Salvador, Augusto, Arturo, Alicia, Alfonso, Emilio and Minerva.

He was a freemason and the leader of the Balangay “Lintik” (Lightning) or Balangay 2 branch of the Masonic Katipunan at Barrio San Rafael, San Roque, Cavite. On September 6, 1896, he was among the 27 prominent Mason leaders or organizers who were arrested and detained in Fort San Felipe.

He also served as Commander in the second stage of the Philippine revolution and during the American regime he served as Justice of Peace.

He died on May 17, 1922.
