= De la Serna =

de la Serna is a surname. Notable people with the name include:

- Ernesto "Che" Guevara de la Serna (1928-1967), Argentine Marxist revolutionary, guerrilla leader and politician
- Jacobo de la Serna (born 1965), American ceramic artist, Spanish Colonial scholar, and painter
- Jorge Juan Crespo de la Serna (1887–1978), Mexican artist, art critic and art historian
- José de la Serna e Hinojosa (1770–1832), Spanish general and Viceroy of Peru
- Juan Pérez de la Serna (1570–1631), seventh Archbishop of Mexico
- Pedro Gómez de la Serna (1806–1871), Spanish jurist and politician
- Ramón Gómez de la Serna (1888–1963), Spanish writer
- Rodrigo de la Serna (born 1976), Argentine actor

== See also ==
- Serna
- Sernas
- La Serna (disambiguation)
- De la Serna family
