= Erika Cuellar =

Bolivian biologist

Erika Cuéllar
- Born: 1978 (age 47–48); Santa Cruz de la Sierra, Bolivia
- Other name: Erika Cuellar Soto
- Education: Gabriel René Moreno Autonomous University, University of Kent; University of Oxford
- Occupation: Biologist
- Known for: Gran Chaco guanacos

Erika Cuéllar Soto (born in Santa Cruz de la Sierra, 1978), is a Bolivian biologist recognized as the guardian of the Gran Chaco region of South America, where she has worked to promote and conserve this ecosystem that covers regions of Bolivia, Argentina, Paraguay and Brazil. A fundamental axis of her activism is the training of local community members in the conservation of their territory as well as the training of parabiologists to be guardians of nature. She has been named a National Geographic explorer.

== Life and work ==
Cuéllar graduated in biology from the Gabriel René Moreno Autonomous University and then obtained a master's degree in Biodiversity Conservation from the University of Kent in England. She earned a PhD in Zoology at the University of Oxford.

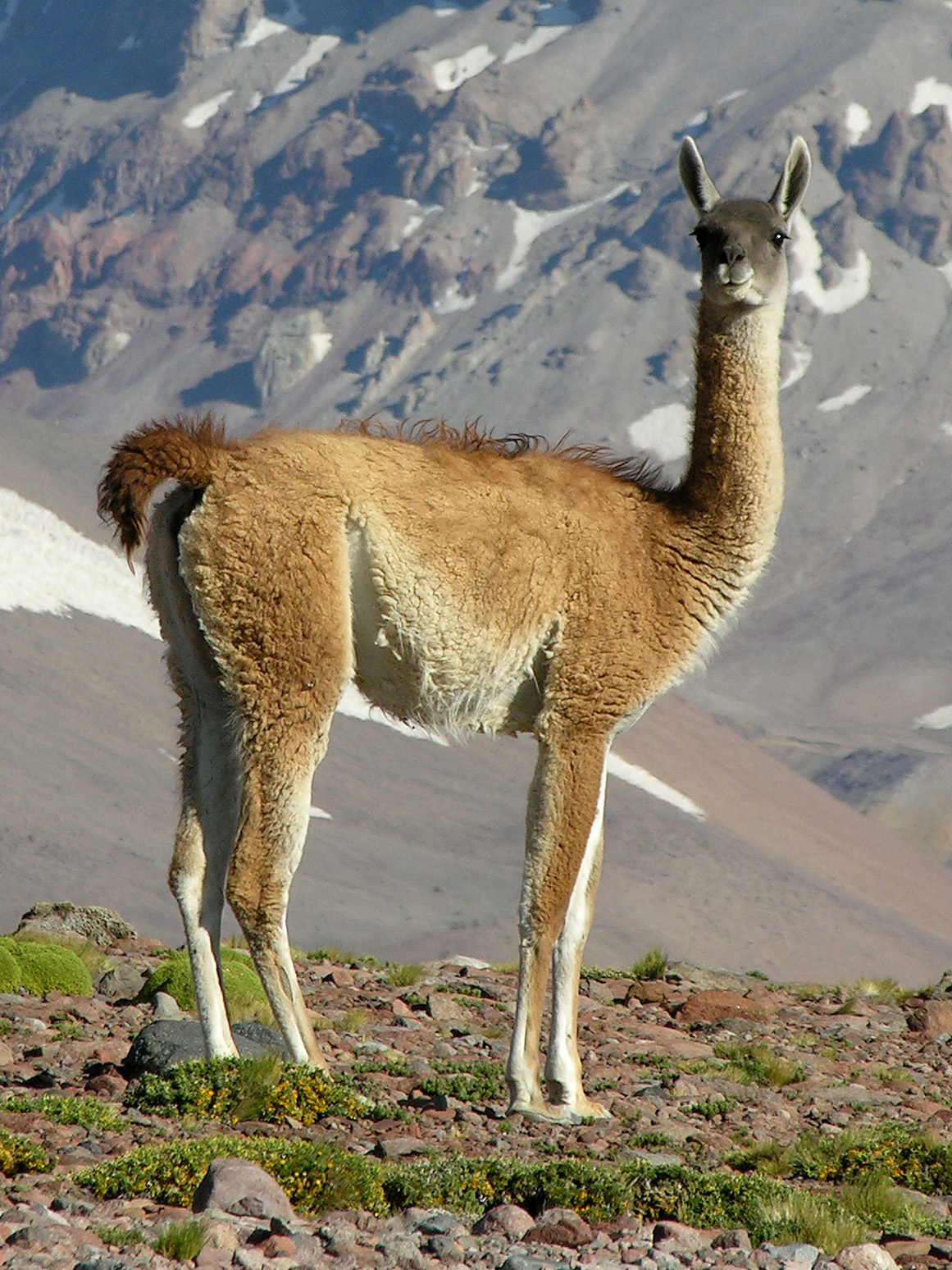
Guanaco, the wild ancestor of the llama.

Cuéllar's work focuses mainly on the conservation and sustainable protection of the Gran Chaco, she is coordinator of the Species Survival Committee of the International Union for Conservation of Nature. A fundamental part of her work consists of training parabiologists, that is, making communities and the local population participate in caring for their environment through comprehensive training so that they can be researchers and custodians of natural resources. In this regard, she has said: “I would like the local people, who know so much about nature, because they were born and lived in it, to stop being (considered) simply cheap labor.”

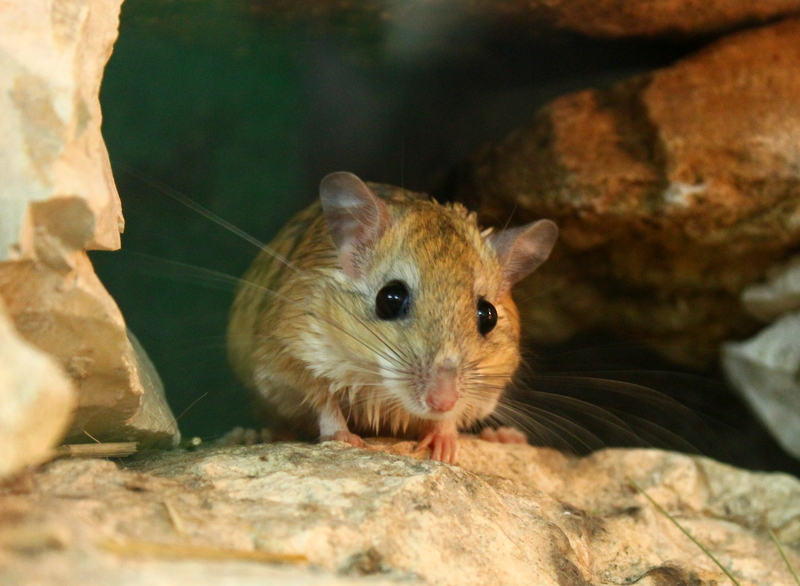
Bushy-tailed Jird (Sekeetamys calurus), adult male

She has worked prominently for the protection of juvenile and adult guanacos. Thanks to Cuéllar's efforts, their hunting has become prohibited, the repopulation of genetically isolated herds is being explored and attempts are being made to recover their habitat, which had been invaded by free-range cattle and invasive plants. According to Arrazola, Cuéllar's impact continues,

Erika Cuéllar's innovative solutions and great passion bring new hope to wildlife. She trains villagers in the Gran Chaco to be practical conservation managers and parabiologists. Communities nominate participants for the 800-hour course that ranges from basic biology, mathematics, and other sciences to map production, computer and GPS use, research project design, data collection, and presentation of results. Those who pass the final exam take their professional skills to the forests, wetlands and rangelands. They make bird and mammal census reports, display and analyze data from cameras and radio tracking devices.

In 2016, Cuéllar was part of the team that made the first recorded sightings of the Sekeetamys calurus rodent (Bushy-tailed Jird) in the territory of southern Oman, in western Asia.

== Selected awards ==
- National Geographic Explorer, 2013
- Character of the year, science category, El Deber, 2012
- Rolex Award for Enterprise, 2012
- Whitley Award in the category Human Rights and Conservation, 2007
