= Carlos Reyes-Manzo =

Chilean photographer and poet

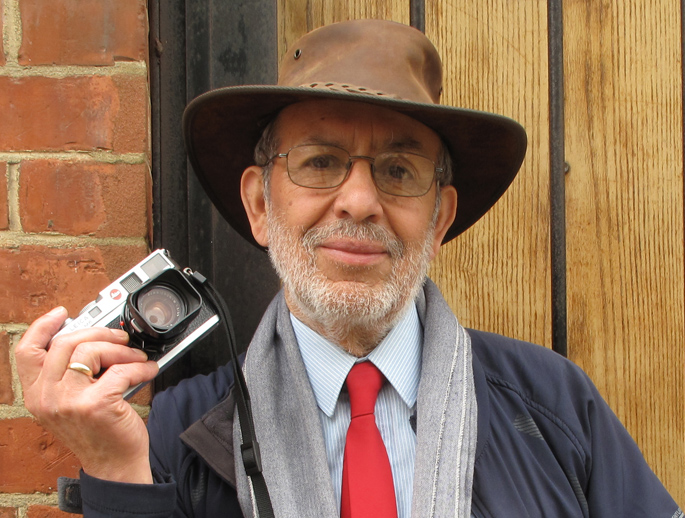
- Born: 23 November 1944 (age 81); Cartagena, Chile
- Known for: Social documentary photography, poetry, politics
- Spouse: Mercedes Cortez-Hernandez
- Children: Marcel Reyes-Cortez; Rocio Reyes-Cortez

Carlos Reyes-Manzo (born 1944 Cartagena, Chile) is a social documentary photographer and poet. He studied with Bob Borowicz and Rafael Sánchez S.J. at the Instituto Filmico of the Pontificia Universidad Catolica de Chile, and in 1964 began working as a photojournalist at Revista Vea in Zig Zag publishing.

He was one of the leaders of the Regional Santiago-Litoral and of the Departamento Campesino of the Central Committee of the Socialist Party of Chile. From 1971 until the military coup of 11 September 1973, he worked at the 16mm department of Chile Films. A member of the Socialist Party in clandestinity, in June 1974 Reyes-Manzo was detained and imprisoned in torture centres and concentration camps, in the underground garage of La Moneda Presidential Palace, Londres 38, Tres Álamos, Cuatro Álamos, Cárcel Pública de Santiago, and Puchuncaví-Melinka.

== Panama 1975-1979 ==
Exiled under Decree 504 to Panama in September 1975, he worked as a photojournalist for Revista Senda, ACAN-EFE and Associated Press documenting social and political issues in Panama and Central America including the Nicaraguan Revolution and the negotiations for the handover of the Panama Canal from the United States.

In November 1979, he was kidnapped in Panama by the Chilean secret police and sent back to Chile via London, where he escaped from the plane.

== Britain from November 1979 ==
Establishing the Andes Press Agency in 1982, a photographic agency and publishing house focusing on social, political and economic issues, Reyes-Manzo has been documenting people in Latin America, Africa, Asia and the Middle East who are marginalised from society and suffer human rights abuses.

=== Ethiopia ===
He was invited by Julian Filochowski, Director of CAFOD, to accompany Cardinal Basil Hume to document the 1984 Ethiopia famine and the photographs were published in the book, I Was Hungry.... He returned to Ethiopia with Save the Children on the 20th anniversary of the famine and the exhibition "Beyond Band Aid: Ethiopia Then and Now 1984/2004" was held at The Bargehouse in London.

=== Exhibitions at Barbican Centre ===
He Planted His Cross Where the Moon Rises marking the 500th anniversary of the Spanish conquest of Latin America, was held at the Barbican Centre in October 1992. A Portrait of the Family, an exhibition on the different concepts of family around the world sponsored by CAFOD was held in June 1994. Dancing Dragons in the Night in 1996 highlighted the social and economic conditions of bonded labourers in Nepal and in India, where many people from Nepal migrate to in search of a better life.

=== Journeys and Dreams ===
A touring exhibition to raise awareness of the social, economic and political divide between and within countries was held at a number of venues across the UK and Europe, including Canterbury Christ Church University College.

=== Iraq ===
Reyes-Manzo travelled to Iraq in 2002 as part of a Caritas International delegation to document the effects of ten years of sanctions on the people of Iraq and the Christian communities. An exhibition was held in February 2003 at Foyles Gallery just before the invasion of Iraq. In May 2003, he returned to Iraq to document the suffering of the Christian communities during the war. He returned to Iraq with Save the Children in February 2004 to document the lives of children and Christian communities in Basra and a second exhibition was held in Foyles in March 2004.

=== Impunity ===
Impunity was held at The Oxo Gallery in London in February 2004 as part of Amnesty International's Stop Violence Against Women campaign. The exhibition highlighted the murders of women in Ciudad Juárez, Mexico, and in Guatemala and the impunity of the perpetrators of the crimes.

== Projects and exhibitions in Canada ==
=== University of Prince Edward Island ===
Resilience and Dreams: Women as Global Citizens was held at the University of Prince Edward Island in 2008 as part of the launch of a new course, Global Issues 151: Critical Thinking and Writing. And a social documentary study on six rural communities in Prince Edward Island was published in Voice of the Community, a collaborative project with a research team from UPEI led by Dr Vianne Timmons.

=== University of Regina ===
In March 2009, Reyes-Manzo was invited to deliver the inaugural Forward Together lecture at the University of Regina where he presented a paper on Representation and Human Rights.

=== Vancouver Island University ===
The Faculty of International Education at Vancouver Island University invited Reyes-Manzo to hold Rights and Wrongs: The Resilience of the World's Indigenous People during International Development Week in February 2012. The following year, the exhibition toured venues in Vancouver Island North in a collaborative project between VIU and North Island College.

== Poetry ==
Oranges in Times of Moon was published in 2006, and later that year Reyes-Manzo participated in the Sidaja International Festival of Poetry in Trieste. He was Amnesty International's inaugural poet-in-residence from 2011 to 2012 during its 50th anniversary year. During the residency he participated in Poetry and the State, an evening of poetry at Amnesty International's Human Rights Action Centre organized by Poet in the City and Modern Poetry in Translation. In November 2012, he was appointed as the first poet-in-residence at Buglife.

== Birkbeck, University of London ==
Appointed first Ben Pimlott Writer-in-Residence in 2014, Reyes-Manzo is currently Associate Research Fellow at the Department of Politics, Birkbeck, University of London, where he graduated with a master's degree in Global Politics in 2013.

The exhibition Dwellings at the Peltz Gallery in Birkbeck's School of Arts in 2015 focused on housing as a fundamental human right, and the effects of inadequate living conditions on the social development of individuals, families and communities.

== Books ==
- Across Frontiers (1996) ISBN 978-0-9527182-1-5
- Oranges in Times of Moon (2006) ISBN 978-0-9527182-4-6
- Voice of the Community (2008) ISBN 978-0-9527182-5-3
- Resilience and Dreams: Women as Global Citizens (2008) ISBN 978-0-919013-57-5
- Keeping Hope Alive: Who finds refuge in Britain? (1996) ISBN 978-0-9527182-2-2
