= Carlos Borunda Zaragoza =

Mexican politician

- Born: 22 February 1971 (age 55); Chihuahua, Mexico
- Education: Boston College (BA) and Harvard University (MPA)
- Occupation: Politician
- Political party: PAN

José Carlos Borunda Zaragoza (born 22 February 1971) is a Mexican politician from the National Action Party (PAN). In the 2000 general election he was elected to the Chamber of Deputies to represent the third district of Chihuahua during the 58th Congress.
