= María Antonieta Pérez Reyes =

Mexican politician

- Born: 14 January 1963 (age 63); Ciudad Juárez, Chihuahua, Mexico
- Education: ITCJ
- Occupation: Politician
- Political party: PAN (2003-2016)

María Antonieta Pérez Reyes (born 14 January 1963) is a Mexican politician. In the 2009 mid-terms she was elected to the Chamber of Deputies to represent the third district of Chihuahua during the 61st Congress.
