= Carlos Fernando Angulo Parra =

Mexican politician

- Born: 11 September 1950 (age 75); Ciudad Juárez, Chihuahua, Mexico
- Occupation: Deputy
- Political party: PAN

Carlos Fernando Angulo Parra (born 11 September 1950) is a Mexican politician and lawyer affiliated with the National Action Party (PAN). In the 2012 general election he was elected to the Chamber of Deputies to represent the third district of Chihuahua during the 62nd Congress.
