= Renato Cuellar =

American politician

Renato Cuellar (1927-2001) was a member of the Texas House of Representatives from 1987 until 1997.

== Sources ==
- Texas Legislature Reference Library
