= La Serna, Palencia =

La Serna
- Municipality and town
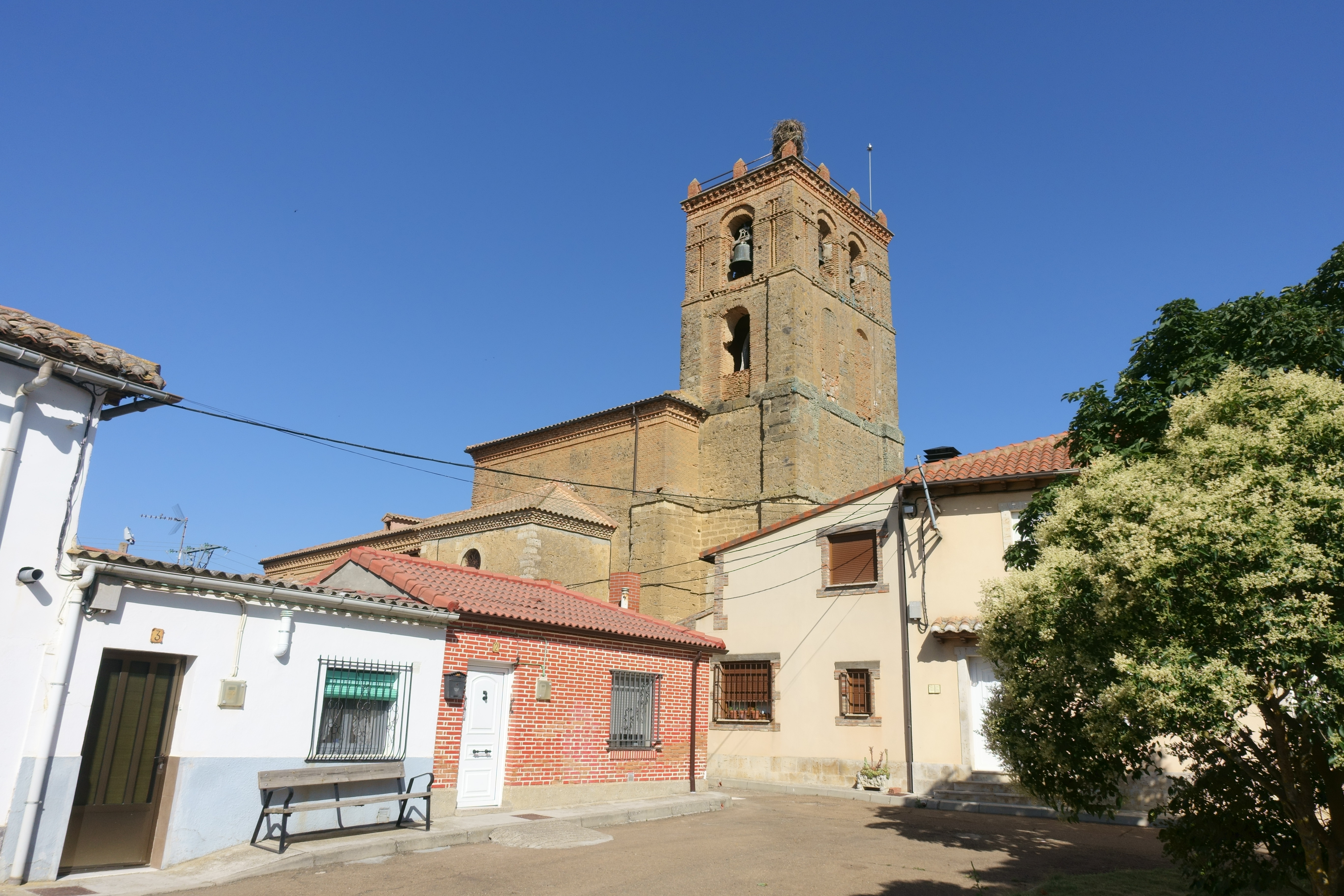
- Interactive map of La Serna
- Coordinates: 42°25′0″N 4°40′0″W
- Country: Spain
- Autonomous community: Castile and León
- Province: Palencia
- Comarca: Vega-Valdavia

Area
  - Total: 12.3 km^{2} (4.7 sq mi)
- Elevation: 866 m (2,841 ft)

Population (2025-01-01)
  - Total: 90
  - Density: 7.3/km^{2} (19/sq mi)
- Time zone: UTC+1 (CET)
  - Summer (DST): UTC+2 (CEST)
- Postal code: 34128
- Website: Official website

La Serna is a municipality located in the province of Palencia, Castile and León, Spain.
