= Víctor Valencia de los Santos =

Mexican politician (1959–2020)

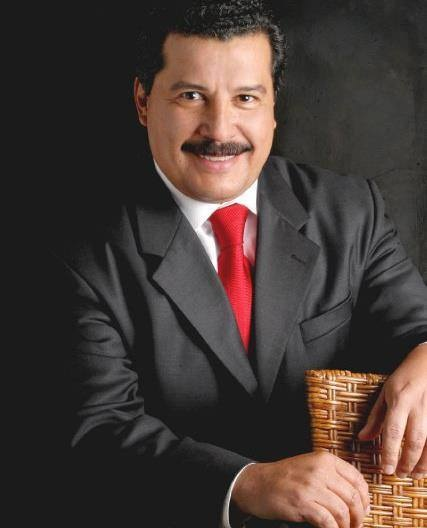
- Víctor Valencia de los Santos in 2014.
- Born: Víctor Leopoldo Valencia de los Santos; 6 April 1959; Ciudad Juárez, Chihuahua, Mexico
- Died: 8 November 2020 (aged 61); Ciudad Juárez, Chihuahua, Mexico
- Occupation: Politician

Víctor Leopoldo Valencia de los Santos (6 April 1959 – 8 November 2020) was a Mexican politician affiliated with the Institutional Revolutionary Party (PRI).

== Biography ==
Between 2006 and 2008 he served as a deputy in the LX Legislature of the Mexican Congress representing the fourth district of Chihuahua.

Valencia de los Santos died on 8 November 2020, from COVID-19.
