= 4th federal electoral district of Chihuahua =

Federal electoral district of Mexico

Chihuahua's 4th
- Electoral district of the Chamber of Deputies of Mexico

- Chihuahua's 4th district since 2022

Incumbent
- Member: Alejandro Pérez Cuéllar
- Party: ▌Ecologist Green Party
- Congress: 66th (2024–2027)

District
- State: Chihuahua
- Head town: Ciudad Juárez
- Coordinates: 31°44′N 106°29′W
- Covers: Ciudad Juárez (part)
- PR region: First
- Precincts: 349
- Population: 378,104 (2020 census)

4th district in 2017–2022

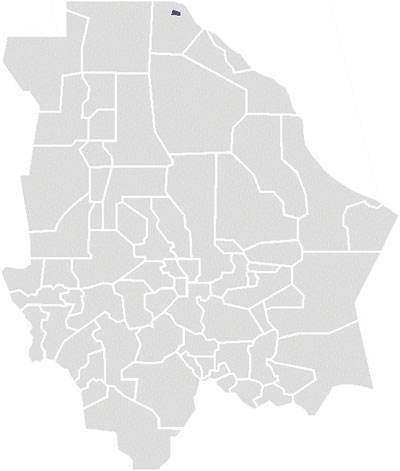
4th district in 2005–2017

The 4th federal electoral district of Chihuahua (Spanish: Distrito electoral federal 04 de Chihuahua) is one of the 300 electoral districts into which Mexico is divided for elections to the federal Chamber of Deputies and one of nine such districts in the state of Chihuahua.

It elects one deputy to the lower house of Congress for each three-year legislative session by means of the first-past-the-post system. Votes cast in the district also count towards the calculation of proportional representation ("plurinominal") deputies elected from the first region.

The current member for the district, elected in the 2024 general election, is Alejandro Pérez Cuéllar of the Ecologist Green Party of Mexico (PVEM).

== District territory ==
Under the 2023 districting plan adopted by the National Electoral Institute (INE), which is to be used for the 2024, 2027 and 2030 federal elections, the district covers 349 electoral precincts (secciones electorales) in the north of Ciudad Juárez. (Note: The remainder of the municipality of Juárez is assigned to the 1st, 2nd and 3rd districts.)

Ciudad Juárez also serves as its head town (cabecera distrital), where results from individual polling stations are gathered together and tallied. The district reported a population of 378,104 in the 2020 census.

== Previous districting schemes ==
Evolution of electoral district numbers
	1974	1978	1996	2005	2017	2023
Chihuahua	6	10	9	9	9	9
Chamber of Deputies	196	300				

2017–2022

Between 2017 and 2022, the 4th district covered the northern portion of Ciudad Juárez.

2005–2017

Under the 2005 districting scheme, the district covered the southern portion of Ciudad Juárez, which also served as the head town.

1996–2005

Chihuahua lost its 10th district in the 1996 redistricting process. The 4th district covered almost exactly the same area as in the 2005 configuration.

1979–1996

The districting scheme in force from 1978 to 1996 was the result of the 1977 electoral reforms, which increased the number of single-member seats in the Chamber of Deputies from 196 to 300. Under that plan, Chihuahua's seat allocation rose from six to ten. The 4th district covered a portion of the Ciudad Juárez urban area and the rural portion of the municipality of Juárez.

== Deputies returned to Congress ==
(Mexico) National parties
- Current
- PAN
- PRI
- PT
- PVEM
- MC
- Morena
- PAZ
- Somos
- Defunct or local only
- PLM
- PNR
- PRM
- PNM
- PP
- PPS
- PARM
- PFCRN
- CON
- PANAL
- PSD
- PES
- PES
- PRD

Chihuahua's 4th district
Election	Deputy	Party	Term	Legislature
1970	Armando González Soto (Note: González Soto resigned his seat in Congress to serve as comptroller of the Government of the Federal District.); Antonio Barrio Mendoza	Institutional Revolutionary Party	1970–1971; 1971–1973	48th Congress
1973	Luis Fuentes Molinar	Institutional Revolutionary Party	1973–1976	49th Congress
1976	Juan Ernesto Madera Prieto	Institutional Revolutionary Party	1976–1979	50th Congress
1979	Miguel Lerma Candelaria	Institutional Revolutionary Party	1979–1982	51st Congress
1982	Francisco Rodríguez Pérez	Institutional Revolutionary Party	1982–1985	52nd Congress
1985	Óscar Luis Rivas Muñoz	National Action Party (Mexico)	1985–1988	53rd Congress
1988	Santiago Rodríguez del Valle	National Action Party (Mexico)	1988–1991	54th Congress
1991	Óscar Nieto Burciaga	Institutional Revolutionary Party	1991–1994	55th Congress
1994	Miguel Lucero Palma	Institutional Revolutionary Party	1994–1997	56th Congress
1997	Carlos Camacho Alcázar	National Action Party (Mexico)	1997–2000	57th Congress
2000	Arturo Meza de la Rosa	National Action Party (Mexico)	2000–2003	58th Congress
2003	Miguel Lucero Palma	Institutional Revolutionary Party	2003–2006	59th Congress
2006	Víctor Valencia de los Santos (Note: Valencia de los Santos requested a leave of absence from Congress to seek the PRI's nomination for municipal president of Juárez; he retook his seat in Congress after failing to secure that candidacy. He requested a second leave of absence to serve as the representative of the Chihuahua state government in Ciudad Juárez as of 1 July 2008.); Octavio Fuentes Téllez	Institutional Revolutionary Party	2006–2009	60th Congress
2009	Adriana Terrazas Porras	Institutional Revolutionary Party	2009–2012	61st Congress
2012	Luis Murguía Lardizábal	Institutional Revolutionary Party	2012–2015	62nd Congress
2015	Adriana Terrazas Porras	Institutional Revolutionary Party	2015–2018	63rd Congress
2018	Ulises García Soto	National Regeneration Movement	2018–2021	64th Congress
2021	Daniela Álvarez Hernández	National Action Party (Mexico)	2021–2024	65th Congress
2024	Alejandro Pérez Cuéllar	Ecologist Green Party of Mexico	2024–2027	66th Congress

=== Congressional results ===
The corresponding page on the Spanish-language Wikipedia contains full electoral results from 1964 to 2021.

2 July 2006 general election: Chihuahua's 4th
Party or Alliance		Candidate		Votes	Percentage
	National Action Party		María Antonieta Pérez Reyes	37,528	36.64 / 100
	Alliance for Mexico (PRI, PVEM)	✓	Víctor Valencia de los Santos	38,897	37.97 / 100
	Coalition for the Good of All (PRD, PT, Convergencia)		José de Jesús Barragán Sánchez	15,459	15.09 / 100
	New Alliance Party		Laurencio Gallegos Jiménez	5,481	5.35 / 100
	Social Democratic and Peasant Alternative		Sandra Rivera Martínez	2,231	2.18 / 100
✗	Unregistered candidates			437	0.43 / 100
✗	Spoilt papers			2,402	2.34 / 100
Total				102,435	100 / 100
Source: IFE.

== Presidential elections ==
Chihuahua's 4th district
Election	District won by	Party or coalition	%
2018	Andrés Manuel López Obrador	Juntos Haremos Historia	44.1679
2024	Claudia Sheinbaum Pardo	Sigamos Haciendo Historia	53.5977
