= Héctor Armando Cabada Alvídrez =

Mayor of Ciudad Juárez, Mexico

Armando Cabada

Municipal President of Ciudad Juárez
- In office October 10, 2016 – September 9, 2021
- Preceded by: Javier González Mocken (interim)
- Succeeded by: Cruz Pérez Cuéllar

Personal details
- Born: Héctor Armando Cabada Alvídrez; 1967 (age 58–59) Ciudad Juárez, Chihuahua, Mexico
- Party: Independent
- Spouse: Alejandra Carrillo Trevizo
- Children: Hector Arnoldo Cabada Zambrano Martha Alexandra Cabada Zambrano Alan Armando Cabada Zambrano Regina Cabada Carrillo
- Occupation: News anchor; director

Héctor Armando Cabada Alvídrez (born September 23, 1967) is a Mexican television journalist, television anchor and politician who has served as the Municipal President of Ciudad Juárez from 2016 until 2021. Cabada, a political independent, was elected to the position in June 2016. He previously had anchored newscasts on XHIJ Canal 44, a television station based in Ciudad Juárez.

== Life ==
Armando Cabada was born in 1968 to Arnoldo Cabada de la O, the founder of XHIJ-TV Canal 44. He was one of five children born of Cabada de la O and his wife, Martha Alvídrez de Cabada. Cabada de la O signed XHIJ on the air in 1980, and in 1988, Armando began his career at XHIJ, later becoming its news director and anchoring its late evening news.

=== Juárez City Independent Mayoral candidacy ===
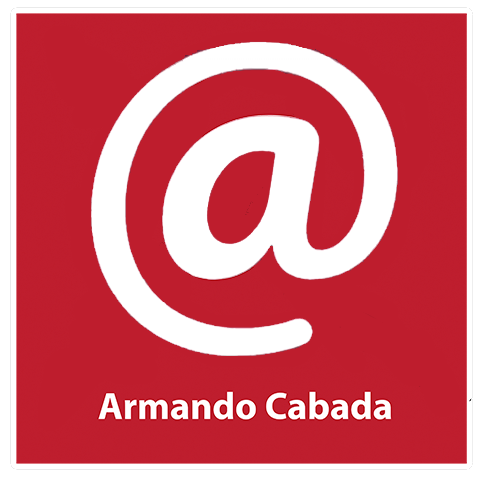
Cabada's mayoral campaign logo

On January 27, 2016, Cabada announced on his newscast that he would leave Canal 44 after more than 27 years and launch an independent candidacy for the municipal presidency of Ciudad Juárez. He received 88,000 signatures, nearly tripling the required 29,000; some of these signatures were supplied by the Citizens' Movement party as a gesture of support. The candidacy sparked drug cartel threats against his family.

On election day, Cabada earned more than 48 percent of the vote, beating the closest candidate from the PRI, Héctor Agustín Murguía Lardizábal, by 23 percentage points. Murguía was seeking a third term as municipal president after serving in the position from 2004 to 2007 and again from 2010 to 2013. Turnout in the mayoral elections jumped from the less than 30 percent of the prior three to 41.5 percent, according to the State Electoral Institute of Chihuahua.

Cabada will only serve a two-year term, as Juárez chose to align its mayoral elections with the national federal elections beginning in 2018. Cabada is eligible for reelection to a three-year term that would end in 2021.
