= Enrique Serrano Escobar =

Mexican politician

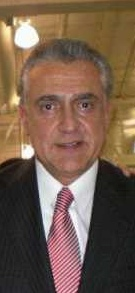

Mayor of Ciudad Juárez
- In office 10 October 2013 – 3 December 2015
- Preceded by: Héctor Murguía Lardizábal
- Succeeded by: Javier González Mocken

Personal details
- Born: 14 May 1958 (age 68) Altar, Sonora, Mexico
- Party: PRI
- Education: Chihuahua Autonomous University
- Website: http://enriqueserranoescobar.com/

Enrique Serrano Escobar (born 14 May 1958) is a Mexican politician affiliated with the Institutional Revolutionary Party (PRI).

In the 2000 general election he was elected to the Chamber of Deputies to represent the first district of Chihuahua during the 60th Congress. From 2013 to 2015 he served as mayor of Ciudad Juárez.

Serrano was born in Altar, Sonora, but grew up in Ciudad Juárez.
