= Cruz Pérez Cuéllar =

Mexican politician

Municipal President of Juárez, Chihuahua
- Incumbent
- Assumed office 2021

Senator of the Congress of the Union from Chihuahua
- In office 29 August 2018 – 9 September 2021 Serving with Bertha Alicia Caraveo Camarena and Gustavo Madero Muñoz
- Preceded by: Patricio Martínez García

Personal details
- Born: 16 January 1969 (age 57) Ciudad Juárez, Chihuahua, Mexico
- Party: PAN (1988–2015); MC (2015–17); Morena (since 2017)

Cruz Pérez Cuéllar (Note: In this Mexican name, the surname is Pérez and the second or maternal family name is Cuéllar.) (born 16 January 1969) is a Mexican politician affiliated with the National Regeneration Movement (Morena). In 2018, he was elected to the Senate from Chihuahua for the 64th and 65th sessions of Congress (2018–2024). He later took leave from the Senate and was elected mayor of Ciudad Juárez on 6 June 2021.

== Early life and education ==
Pérez Cuéllar was born in Ciudad Juárez, Chihuahua, on 16 January 1969. He studied law at the Universidad Autónoma de Ciudad Juárez (UACJ) while also owning a jewelry store known as La Colonial. During this time, he became active in student organizations and joined the National Action Party (PAN) in 1988.

== Political career ==
=== National Action Party ===
In 1991, Pérez Cuéllar coordinated the PAN's congressional campaign in Chihuahua's 4th district. Three years later, he was elected to a plurinominal seat in the Chamber of Deputies for the 56th Congress, during which he served on seven commissions, including Youth Matters and Border Matters. He also became part of the municipal committee for the PAN in Ciudad Juárez and later the secretary of organization for the PAN in Chihuahua. Between 1997 and 1998, he served as state party general secretary.

In 1998, Pérez Cuéllar was elected to the Congress of Chihuahua, leading the PAN caucus. In 2000, he was elected state party head, but resigned in 2003 ahead of a campaign for mayor of Ciudad Juárez.

From 2006 to 2009, he returned to the Chamber of Deputies in the 60th Congress, representing Chihuahua's 3rd district. In 2008, he again became leader of the state party. In 2012, he sought but did not obtain the PAN nomination for the Senate.

=== Citizens' Movement ===
In March 2015, Pérez Cuéllar left the PAN after publicly accusing Senator Javier Corral Jurado of misconduct. He affiliated with Movimiento Ciudadano (MC) and ran for governor of Chihuahua in 2016. His campaign platform included participatory budgeting, a recall referendum for the governor, and expanded child care services. In 2017, testimony in a corruption trial revealed that former governor César Duarte had financed his campaign with MXN$15 million in misappropriated funds.

=== Morena ===
In 2017, Pérez Cuéllar joined the National Regeneration Movement (Morena) and ran for the Senate in 2018 on the Juntos Haremos Historia coalition ticket with Bertha Alicia Caraveo Camarena. The ticket won a plurality, and both candidates were elected. He resigned his Senate seat on 9 September 2021 and was replaced for the remainder of his term by his alternate, Rafael Espino de la Peña.

=== Mayor of Ciudad Juárez ===
On 6 June 2021, Pérez Cuéllar was elected mayor of Ciudad Juárez, and he was re-elected to a second term on 2 June 2024.

Pérez Cuéllar has aspirations to contend for the governorship of Chihuahua for the third time in the 2027 state elections and, on 28 September 2026, he was announced as Morena's "state coordinator for the defence of the transformation and national sovereignty", in which capacity he is expected to represent the party in the gubernatorial election of 6 June 2027.
