= Yalo Cuéllar =

Bolivian musician

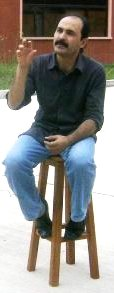
Yalo Cuéllar

Sadi Jorge Cuellar Maire (born 26 December 1963 in Yacuiba), known as Yalo Cuéllar, is a Bolivian composer and musician.
