= Roberto Laserna =

Bolivian and Spanish writer and economist

Roberto Laserna (born 1953) is a Bolivian and Spanish writer and economist who earned a PhD from the University of California, Berkeley in regional planning.

== Career ==
He won the Literary National Prize Franz Tamayo in 1976 before becoming a scientist. His book 20 (mis)conceptions on coca and cocaine addresses drug policy and development problems, and La democracia en el ch`enko explains one of the most neglected causes of economic stagnation: economic heterogeneity. In his later book "La Trampa del Rentismo" Laserna presents his theory on the Rent-seeking trap, and explores the influence of the abundance of natural resources in shaping the political institutions and economic culture that drives underdevelopment in Bolivia.

He has also researched social conflicts, drug trafficking, decentralization and urbanization. He was a professor at Universidad Mayor de San Simon, and has been at Princeton University (2003–2004). He is a researcher at CERES, a private research center in Cochabamba and President of Fundacion Milenio, a think tank in La Paz.

== Works ==
- 2011 El fracaso del prohibicionismo. Fundación Vicente Pazos Kanki, La Paz.
- 2008 La riqueza nacional para la gente. (Working Paper) La Paz, Fundación Milenio.
- 2005 Ciudades y pobreza. Cochabamba, UMSS. ISBN 978-99905-63-70-2
- 2004 La democracia en el ch´enko. La Paz, Fundación Milenio. (three editions)
- 2001 Conflictos sociales y movimientos políticos. El año 2000 en Bolivia. Documentos de Trabajo. Cochabamba, Ceres-Dfid.
- 1997 20 (mis)conceptions on coca and cocaine. La Paz, Plural Publishers.
- 1996 20 Juicios y Prejuicios sobre coca-cocaína. La Paz, Ed. Clave-Plataforma de contrapartes Novib.
- 1994a Las Drogas y el Ajuste en Bolivia. Economía clandestina y políticas públicas. La Paz, Ed. CEDLA.
- 1994b La Masacre del Valle. El desencuentro militar campesino. Cochabamba, Ed. CERES.
- 1992 Productores de Democracia. Acción social y procesos políticos en Bolivia (1971–1991). Cochabamba, Ed. FACES/CERES.
- 1984 Espacio y sociedad regional. Cochabamba, Ed. CERES.

== Co authored Works ==
- 2008 Conflicto social y crecimiento económico en Bolivia. With José Luis Evia and Stergios Skaperdas. La Paz, Instituto para la Democracia, Ceres and Cosude.
- 2008 Roberto Laserna; Miguel Villarroel Nikitenko (2008). 38 años de conflictos sociales en Bolivia: enero de 1970-enero de 2008 : descripción general y por periodos gubernamentales. CERES, Centro de Estudios de la Realidad Económica y Social.
- 2007 Constitución y poder político. Con Luis Verdesoto, Henry Oporto y Maria Teresa Zegada. Ed. Plural. La Paz.
- 2006 La trampa del rentismo. La Paz, Fundación Milenio, with Jose M. Gordillo and Jorge Komadina. (two editions)
- 2004 Derechos humanos en Bolivia. Proceso y desafìos. (Coordinator) La Paz, Defensor del Pueblo.
- 2002 Actuar en proyectos, pensar en procesos. De Río a Johannesburgo: experiencias latinoamericanas hacia el desarrollo sostenible. Coordinator and writer in the production of this book from the Red Humana Agenda 21-América Latina. Serie Approaches to Sustainability, Regional Study. New York, Capacity 21, PNUD.
- 1999 Empujando la concertación. Marchas campesinas, opinión pública y coca. With Natalia Camacho and Eduardo Córdova. La Paz, Ed. Pieb-Ceres.
- 1998 El Desarrollo Humano en Bolivia 1998. Co-author, responsible of the section "Reducir las Brechas y Construir la Equidad" . La Paz, PNUD.
- 1997c La Seguridad Humana en Bolivia. Co-author, responsible of "Seguridad Económica". La Paz, Ed. PNUD-ILDIS.
- 1997a La Fuerza de la Equidad. El desarrollo Humano en Bolivia. With Fernando Calderón G. La Paz, Ed. Los Amigos del Libro.
- 1996b El Circuito coca cocaína y sus implicaciones. With Alain Touraine and Gustavo Fernández. La Paz, Ed. Ildis.
- 1995a Sostenibilidad y Desarrollo Humano. Calidad de Vida en Cochabamba. In collaboration with Jorge Cortés, Carmen Ledo, Alejandra Ramírez and Roberto Valdivieso. Cochabamba, Ed. Los Amigos del Libro.
- 1995b Los Mercados Vallunos de Tierras. With Alberto Rivera and Juan Torrico. La Paz, Ed. Ildis, Ceres.

1994 a Paradojas de la Modernidad. Sociedad y Cambios en Bolivia; co-authored with Fernando Calderón. La Paz, Ed. Fundación Milenio.

- 1991 La Nueva Dependencia. Cambio tecnológico y reestructuración socio-económica en América Latina; coauthored with Manuel Castells. Cochabamba, Ed. CERES.
- 1989 Desktop Mapping for Planning and Decision Making; with John D. Landis. San Jose (CA), Strategic Mapping.
- 1979 La Pobreza en Cochabamba (un análisis socio-económico en la periferia urbana). With Fernando Cosío. Cochabamba, Publicaciones IESE.

On the author: Caceres Romero Adolfo, Diccionario de la Literatura Boliviana, Ed Los Amigos del Libro.

Molina Fernando, El pensamiento boliviano sobre los recursos naturales, Ed. Pulso, La Paz.

Guttentag Tichauer Werner, Bio-bibliografia boliviana (several years).

By the author: Urbanizacion y pobreza, Ed. Pulso, La Paz, 2007 La trampa del rentismo, Ed. Milenio, La Paz, 2006 La democracia en el ch'enko, Ed. Milenio/Ceres, La Paz, 2005 20 (mis)conceptions on coca and cocaine, Ed. Clave, La Paz, 1997 See also: Socio-political conflict and economic performance in Bolivia, with Jose Luis Evia and Stergios Skaperdas, https://ssrn.com/abstract=1104954 Decentralization, Local Iniktiatives and Cirizenship in Bolivia, 1994–2004, in the book Participatory Innovation and Representative Democracy in Latin America, edited by Andrew Selee and Enrique Peruzzotti, The Johns Hopkins University/Woodrow Wilson Center Press, 2009
