= Ascensión Municipality =

Municipality in the Mexican state of Chihuahua

Ascensión
- Municipality
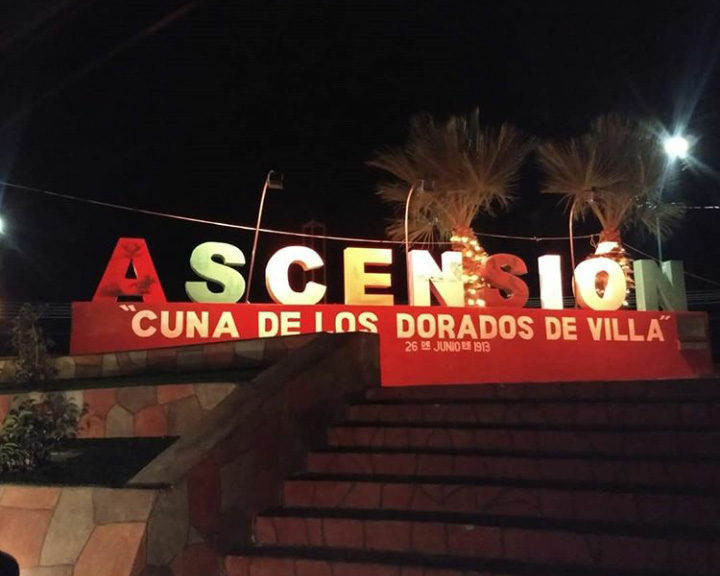

- Municipality of Ascensión in Chihuahua
- Coordinates: 31°05′34″N 107°59′47″W
- Country: Mexico
- State: Chihuahua
- Municipal seat: Ascensión

Area
  - Total: 11,000.1 km^{2} (4,247.2 sq mi)
- Elevation: 1,300 m (4,300 ft)

Population (2010)
  - Total: 23,975

Ascensión is one of the 67 municipalities of Chihuahua, in northern Mexico, along the border with the United States. The city of Ascensión, Chihuahua, is the municipal seat. The municipality covers an area of 11,000.1 km^{2} (4,247.2 sq mi).

As of 2010, the municipality had a total population of 23,975, with just over half living in the municipal seat of Ascensión.

== Geography ==
=== Towns and villages ===
The largest localities (cities, towns, and villages) are:

Name	2010 Census Population
Ascensión	13,456
Puerto Palomas de Villa	4,866
Guadalupe Victoria	1,369
El Bismarck	885
Entronque	670
Total Municipality	23,975

=== Adjacent municipalities and counties ===
- Juárez Municipality - east
- Ahumada Municipality - southeast
- Buenaventura Municipality - south
- Nuevo Casas Grandes Municipality - south
- Janos Municipality - west
- Hidalgo County, New Mexico - northwest
- Luna County, New Mexico - north
- Doña Ana County, New Mexico - northeast
