= José Reyes Estrada Aguirre =

Mexican politician (1929–1989)

José Reyes Estrada Aguirre (Chihuahua, Chihuahua, 1929 – Ciudad Juárez, Chihuahua, 31 March 1989) was a Mexican politician, affiliated with the Institutional Revolutionary Party (PRI). Between 1980 and 1983, he served as municipal president of Ciudad Juárez.

José Reyes Estrada was schooled in the city of Chihuahua and in Saltillo, Coahuila, and studied law at the National Autonomous University (UNAM) in Mexico City. After earning his degree, he relocated his family to Ciudad Juárez, Chihuahua, in 1968, where he served as a family judge. He later held positions as the secretary and the treasurer of the Juárez municipal government and, in 1962, was appointed private secretary to Governor of Chihuahua Práxedes Ginér Durán. He later became a notary public and, in 1976, he was elected to the federal Chamber of Deputies for Chihuahua's third district, serving in the 50th Congress from 1976 to 1979. At the end of his period in Congress, he was appointed the regional delegate of the Secretariat of Commerce in Ciudad Juárez.

He was elected municipal president (mayor) of Juárez in 1980 and took office on 10 October of that year. During his time as mayor, he oversaw the construction of the new city hall. At the end of his mandate, he was replaced as mayor by Francisco Barrio, the first ever non-PRI municipal president of Juárez.

Reyes Estrada died in Ciudad Juárez on 31 March 1989. His son, José Reyes Ferriz, served as municipal president of Ciudad Juárez from 2007 to 2010.

Preceded by Manuel Quevedo Reyes	Municipal President of Ciudad Juárez; 1980–1983	Succeeded by Francisco Barrio
