= Šernas =

- Lithuanian surname
- m.: Šernas
- f.: (unmarried): Šernaitė
- f.: (married): Šernienė
- Origin: literally "wild boar"

Šernas is a Lithuanian language family name. It may refer to:

- Darvydas Šernas, Lithuanian footballer
- Jacques Sernas (1925–2015), Lithuanian-born French actor
- Jokūbas Šernas (1888–1926), Lithuanian attorney, journalist, teacher and banker, a signatory to the Act of Independence of Lithuania
- Tomas Šernas, former Lithuanian customs officer and the only survivor of the Medininkai Massacre
- Juozas Adomaitis-Šernas

== See also ==
- Serna
