= Héctor Murguía Lardizábal =

Mexican politician (1953–2024)

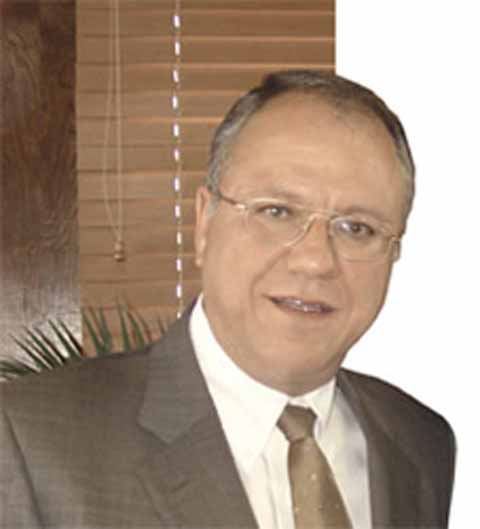

Héctor Murguía Lardizábal (13 March 1953 – 8 January 2024) was a Mexican politician. He was a senator, a federal deputy in the 61st Congress (2009–2010 and mayor of Ciudad Juárez from 2004 to 2007 and 2010 to 2013.

== Biography ==
Murguía was born on 13 March 1953. He graduated from the Monterrey Institute of Technology and Higher Education (ITESM), majoring in chemical engineering. In his twenties, from 1973 to 1975, he worked as a high school teacher at the Instituto Tecnológico y de Estudios Superiores de Monterrey (ITESM), at Monterrey, Nuevo León. He later taught for a year (1978–1979) at the Universidad Autonóma de Ciudad Juárez, Mexico. Afterwards, he worked as the general manager of a bread factory. In 1978, he transferred back to Ciudad Juárez to work for a family-owned home improvement store, Maderería del Norte S.A. A year after, in 1979, he became the owner of a local manufacturing paint company, Química Industrial Fronteriza S.A. de C.V. (Pinturas Dekoro).

In 1994 he was elected to the Senate for Chihuahua in conjunction with Martha Lara Alatorre, defeating the formula of the National Action Party (PAN), headed by Luis H. Álvarez. He defeated Álvarez with the highest number of votes in any election in the state of Chihuahua.

In 2004 he defeated the PAN candidate, Cruz Pérez Cuéllar, in the race for mayor, making him the first winning candidate from the PRI in 12 years. During this term, he constructed a peripheral ring road, Camino Real, which connected the north and south part of Ciudad Juárez benefitting over a million citizens in their commute to work. Further, his administration won national accolades for an energy project generating green energy from capturing methane gas from the city's largest landfill. Additionally, 30 community centers were inaugurated in the city's poorest and most marginalized neighborhoods to reconstruct the social fabric. In prior years, trash collection had been a major issue for the city of Juárez. During Murguía's administration with the help of private organizations trash collection was made efficient and consistent.

On 15 December 2009, he applied for leave as federal deputy to seek his party's nomination for governor of Chihuahua, but César Duarte Jáquez was nominated.

On 10 March 2010, he was nominated as the PRI's unity candidate for municipal president of Juárez. He was elected to a second term as the head of the city council in the elections of 4 July 2010, assuming office on October 10. During his term, one of his major accomplishments was bringing peace and security to the border city. From 2008 to 2010 Ciudad Juárez occupied first place among cities with the highest homicide rates. During Murguía's term, his commitment and policies allowed for the homicide rate to decrease significantly from 3,000 a year to less than 300. Murguía's administration was responsible for erecting the famous landmark "X" which was constructed as a tribute to Mexico's president Benito Juárez. The X symbolizes the cross between two cultures the indigenous and the Spanish. The cross is also an Aztec religious symbol signifying the Fifth Sun.

Murguía Lardizábal was married to Patricia Holguín Cárdenas and was the father to three children, Héctor (born 1985), Patricia (1987–2019), and Isabel (born 1989). He died on 8 January 2024, at the age of 70.
