= Congress of Chihuahua =

Legislature of Chihuahua, Mexico

Congress of the State of Chihuahua Congreso del Estado de Chihuahua
- Sixty-seventh legislature of the Congress of Chihuahua

Type
- Type: Unicameral

History
- Founded: 4 September 1823

Leadership
- President: Adriana Terrazas Porras, MORENA
- First Vice President: Edgar Piñón Domínguez, PRI
- Second Vice President: Rocío Guadalupe Sarmiento, PAN

Structure
- Seats: 33
- Political groups: Government (12): PAN (12); Supported by (4): PRI (4); Opposition (17): MORENA (12); PT (2); MC (2); PVEM (1)

Elections
- Voting system: 22 with first-past-the-post and 11 with proportional representation
- Last election: 2 June 2024
- Next election: 2027

Meeting place
- Chihuahua, Chihuahua

Website
- congresochihuahua.gob.mx

The Congress of the State of Chihuahua (Spanish: Congreso del Estado de Chihuahua) is the legislative branch of the government of the State of Chihuahua. The Congress is the governmental deliberative body of Chihuahua, which is equal to, and independent of, the executive. It meets in the state capital, the city of Chihuahua.

The Congress is unicameral and consists of 33 deputies. 22 deputies are elected on a first-past-the-post basis, one for each district in which the state is divided, while 11 are elected through a system of proportional representation. Deputies are elected to serve for a three-year term.

== Past Composition (Note: Since 1950) ==
1950–1953

12
PRI

1953–1956

12
PRI

1956–1959

12
PRI

1959–1962

12
PRI

1962–1965

12
PRI

1965–1968

12
PRI

1968–1971

14
PRI

1971–1974

14
PRI

1974–1977

14
PRI

1977–1980

14
PRI

1980–1983

14	2
PRI	PAN

1983–1986

9	4
PRI	PAN

1986–1989

14
PRI

1989–1992

1	1	22	4
CDP	PRD	PRI	PAN

1992–1995

1	1	11	15
PRD	PARM	PRI	PAN

1995–1998

1	1	15	7
CDP	PRD	PRI	PAN

1998–2001

3	18	12
PRD	PRI	PAN

2001–2004

2	2	18	11
PT	PRD	PRI	PAN

2004–2007

2	3	18	10
PT	PRD	PRI	PAN

2007–2010

1	1	1	3	15	12
PT	PRD	PVEM	PNA	PRI	PAN

2010–2013

1	1	2	4	19	6
PT	PRD	PVEM	PNA	PRI	PAN

2013–2016

2	2	1	2	2	17	7
PT	PRD	MC	PVEM	PNA	PRI	PAN

2016–2018

2	2	1	1	2	3	5	16	1
PT	MORENA	PRD	MC	PVEM	PNA	PRI	PAN	PES

2018–2021

2	8	2	1	1	4	11	4
PT	MORENA	MC	PVEM	PNA	PRI	PAN	PES

2021–2024

1	11	1	5	15
PT	MORENA	MC	PRI	PAN

2024–Present

2	11	2	2	4	12
PT	MORENA	MC	PVEM	PRI	PAN

== See also ==
- List of Mexican state congresses
