= 2010 in Mexico =

- Decades: 1990s; 2000s; 2010s; 2020s
- See also: History of Mexico; List of years in Mexico; Timeline of Mexican history

This is a list of events that happened in 2010 in Mexico. The article also lists the most important political leaders during the year at both federal and state levels.

== Incumbents ==
=== Federal government ===
- President: Felipe Calderón PAN
- Interior Secretary (SEGOB)
  - Fernando Gómez Mont, until July 14
  - Francisco Blake Mora, starting July 14
- Secretary of Foreign Affairs (SRE): Patricia Espinosa
- Communications Secretary (SCT): Luis Téllez
- Education Secretary (SEP): Alonso Lujambio
- Secretary of Defense (SEDENA): Guillermo Galván Galván
- Secretary of Navy (SEMAR): Mariano Francisco Saynez Mendoza
- Secretary of Labor and Social Welfare (STPS): Javier Lozano Alarcón
- Secretary of Welfare (SEDESOL): Heriberto Félix Guerra
- Tourism Secretary (SECTUR)
  - Rodolfo Elizondo Torres, until March 10
  - Gloria Guevara, starting March 10
- Secretary of the Environment (SEMARNAT): Juan Rafael Elvira Quesada
- Secretary of Health (SALUD): José Ángel Córdova
- Secretary of Public Security (SSP): Genaro García Luna
- Secretary of Finance and Public Credit (SHCP): Ernesto Cordero Arroyo
- Secretariat of Energy (Mexico) (SENER): Georgina Yamilet Kessel Martínez, starting December 1
- Secretary of Agriculture (SAGARPA): Alberto Cárdenas
- Secretary of Public Function (FUNCIÓN PÚBLICA): Salvador Vega Casillas
- Secretary of Agrarian Reform (SRA): Germán Martínez
- Secretary of Economy (SE)
  - Gerardo Ruiz Mateos, until date not available
  - Bruno Francisco Ferrari García de Alba, starting date not available
- Attorney General of Mexico (PRG): Arturo Chávez Chávez

=== Governors ===
- Aguascalientes
  - Luis Armando Reynoso PAN, until November 30
  - Carlos Lozano de la Torre, (Institutional Revolutionary Party, PRI), starting December 1
- Baja California: José Guadalupe Osuna Millán PAN
- Baja California Sur: Narciso Agúndez Montaño PRD
- Campeche: Fernando Ortega Bernés PRI
- Chiapas: Juan Sabines Guerrero (Coalition for the Good of All)
- Chihuahua
  - José Reyes Baeza Terrazas PRI, until October 3
  - César Duarte Jáquez PRI, starting October 4
- Coahuila: Humberto Moreira Valdés PRI
- Colima: Mario Anguiano Moreno PRI
- Durango: Ismael Hernández PRI
- Guanajuato: Juan Manuel Oliva Ramírez PAN
- Guerrero: Zeferino Torreblanca PRD
- Hidalgo: Miguel Ángel Osorio Chong PRI
- Jalisco: Emilio González Márquez PAN
- State of Mexico: Enrique Peña Nieto PRI
- Michoacán: Leonel Godoy Rangel PRD
- Morelos: Marco Antonio Adame PAN.
- Nayarit: Ney González Sánchez
- Nuevo León: Rodrigo Medina de la Cruz PRI
- Oaxaca
  - Ulises Ruiz Ortiz PRI, until November 30
  - Gabino Cué Monteagudo, Convergence, starting December 1
- Puebla: Mario Plutarco Marín Torres PRI
- Querétaro: José Calzada PRI
- Quintana Roo: Félix González Canto PRI
- San Luis Potosí: Fernando Toranzo Fernández PRI
- Sinaloa: Jesús Aguilar Padilla PRI, until December 31
- Sonora: Guillermo Padrés Elías PAN
- Tabasco: Andrés Granier Melo PRI
- Tamaulipas: Eugenio Hernández Flores PRI, until December 31
- Tlaxcala: Héctor Ortiz Ortiz PAN
- Veracruz
  - Fidel Herrera Beltrán PRI, until November 30
  - Javier Duarte de Ochoa PRI, starting December 1
- Yucatán: Ivonne Ortega Pacheco PRI
- Zacatecas
  - Amalia García PRD, until September 11
  - Miguel Alonso Reyes PRI, starting September 12
- Head of Government of the Federal District: Marcelo Ebrard PRD

== Events ==
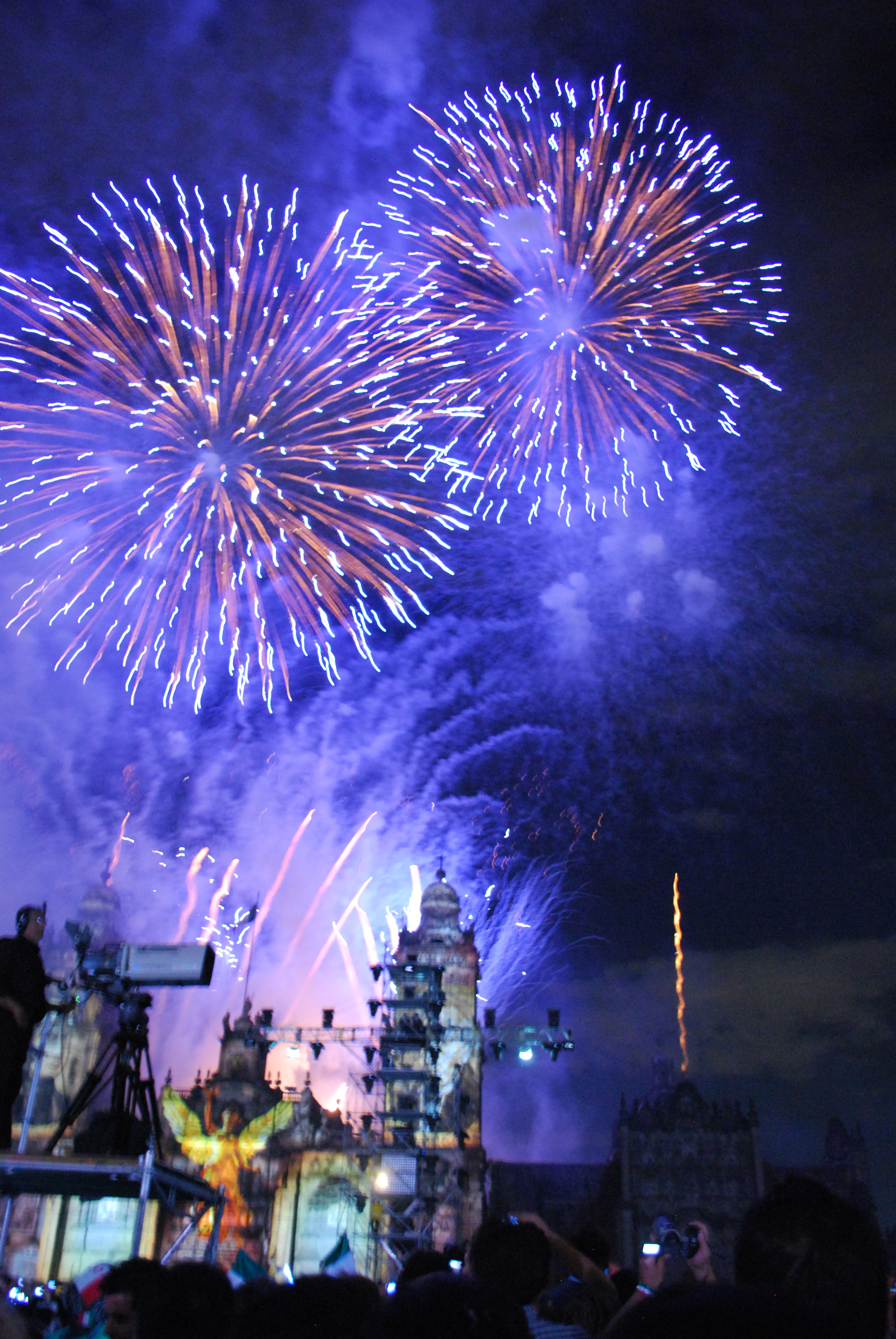
Celebration of Mexican political anniversaries in 2010

Tropical Storm Matthew arriving to Mexican territory on September 23, 2010.

- January 3 – Mexican police arrest alleged drug lord Carlos Beltrán Leyva in Culiacán, Sinaloa.
- January 12 – Mexican authorities report the capture of Teodoro García Simental, one of the country's most notorious drug lords, in a raid in La Paz, Baja California Sur.
- February 7 – Serial killer Raúl Osiel Marroquín's sentence of 280 years in prison for the kidnapping and murder of four gay men in 2005 is confirmed by authorities.
- March 4 – A Mexico City law allowing same-sex marriages takes effect.
- March 19 – Jorge Antonio Mercado Alonso, 23, and Javier Francisco Arredondo Verdugo, 24, students at the Tecnológico de Monterrey are killed on the university campus in Nuevo León by the Mexican Army. Cuauhtémoc Antúnez, the military commander, accused them of drug trafficking, but a subsequent investigation proved that the soldiers altered the scene and planted weapons on the young men. Nine years later, on March 19, 2019, Olga Sánchez Cordero, Secretaria de Gobernación (Interior Secretary) apologized for the government's actions.
- March 30 – Ten children, youths and young adults between the ages of 8 and 21 are gunned down, presumably by drug traffickers, in the northern Mexican state of Durango.
- April 25 – Mexican Labour Party leader in Guerrero Rey Hernández dies after being shot at least seven times outside his home in Tlacoachistlahuaca.
- May 15 – Former Mexican presidential candidate Diego Fernández de Cevallos is abducted from one of his homes in Pedro Escobedo, Querétaro.
- May 31 – A mass grave containing between 20 and 25 bodies is found in an abandoned mine near Taxco, Guerrero, in Mexico.
- June 11 – 40 people are killed and at least four others are wounded in an attack by at least 30 gunmen in Chihuahua, Mexico.
- June 14 – At least 28 prisoners are killed in a clash between rival gangs in Sinaloa, Mexico.
- June 15 – Two trains collide in the northern Mexican state of Sinaloa resulting in the death of at least 13 people.
- June 16 – A shootout in the Mexican tourist town of Taxco leaves 15 dead.
- June 20 – A Bell 412 Mexican military helicopter crashes in Durango state in northern Mexico Saturday, killing all 11 people on board.
- June 28 – Rodolfo Torre Cantu, a leading candidate in a Mexican state election is assassinated near Ciudad Victoria. President of Mexico Felipe Calderón blamed drug cartels for the assassination.
- June 30 – 2010 Oaxaca earthquake: A 6.2-magnitude earthquake occurs in southern Mexico near the city of Pinotepa Nacional, shaking buildings as far away as Mexico City but not causing serious damage or casualties.
- July 4 – 2010 Mexican gubernatorial elections: Voters in 14 Mexican states vote to elect governors and mayors.
- July 18 – At least 17 people are killed and at least 10 others are wounded during a pre-dawn gun attack on a birthday party in Torreón, Coahuila state in Mexico, across the border from Texas.
- July 24 – A mass grave containing at least 50 tortured and burned corpses is unearthed east of Monterrey, Nuevo León, in Mexico.
- July 28 – Eight severed heads are discovered in four locations in the Mexican state of Durango.
- July 29 – The Mexican Army kills Sinaloa Cartel drug lord Ignacio Coronel Villarreal in Zapopan, Jalisco, during a raid.
- August 6 – At least 14 people are killed during a prison riot in Matamoros in the Mexican state of Tamaulipas.
- August 9 – Former President of Mexico Vicente Fox calls for the legalisation of drugs in Mexico.
- August 10 – The Supreme Court of Justice of the Nation rules same-sex marriages in Mexico City have to be recognised across Mexico.
- August 16 – At least 2 people are injured after a grenade explosion outside a Televisa television station in Monterrey, Nuevo León, Mexico.
- August 16 – The mayor of the Mexican town of Santiago, Nuevo León, Edelmiro Cavazos, is abducted.
- August 18 – The corpse of mayor Edelmiro Cavazos of the Mexican town of Santiago, Nuevo León, is found handcuffed and blindfolded after his abduction on Sunday night.
- August 20 – Six police officers in Mexico are arrested and accused of participating in the kidnap and murder of Mayor Edelmiro Cavazos.
- August 23 – Jimena Navarrete, representing Mexico, wins Miss Universe 2010.
- August 25 – Mexican Naval Infantry find 72 corpses at a remote ranch in San Fernando, Tamaulipas, near the border with the U.S. state of Texas. The victims were economic migrants from Central America and South America believed to be murdered by a drug cartel.
- August 27 – Two bombs explode in the Mexican city of Ciudad Victoria, the capital of Tamaulipas, outside the municipal police station and the Televisa television station.
- August 29 – Unidentified gunmen assassinate Marco Antonio Leal Garcia, the mayor of the small town of Hidalgo in Tamaulipas, Mexico.
- August 30 – Marco Antonio Leal García, the Mayor of Hidalgo, Tamaulipas, in northeastern Mexico, is shot dead while operating his car.
- August 31 – Eight people are killed in a petrol bomb attack at a bar in Cancún, Mexico.
- September 2 – At least 17 migrants are kidnapped by suspected human traffickers in Tijuana, Baja California, in northwestern Mexico.
- September 10 – At least 71 prisoners escape from jail in the Mexican city of Reynosa, Tamaulipas, across the U.S. border from McAllen, Texas.
- September 16 – Mexico celebrates 200 years of independence from Spain.
- September 28 – 2010 Oaxaca landslide, six killed
- September 29 – Another landslide in the Mexican state of Chiapas kills 16 people and leaves four missing.
- October 3 – Twenty-two Mexican tourists are kidnapped in Acapulco.
- October 7 – Six gangsters died and one soldier was injured when an army patrol clashed with suspected gang members in northeastern Mexico state Tamaulipas.
- October 18 – At least nineteen people die near Santiago de Querétaro, Mexico, after a bus collides with a truck.
- October 23 – Mexican gunmen kill 13 people and wound fifteen at a birthday party in the Mexican border city of Ciudad Juárez.
- October 24 – Mexican gunmen burst into a drug rehabilitation centre in eastern Tijuana, killing 13 people.

== Awards ==
- Belisario Domínguez Medal of Honor – Luis H. Álvarez
- Order of the Aztec Eagle
- National Prize for Arts and Sciences
- National Public Administration Prize
- Ohtli Award
  - Polly Baca
  - Hilda Solis
  - Olga Talamante
  - Antonio Villaraigosa
  - John C. Zaragoza
  - Rosa Rosales
  - Ben Hueso

== Popular culture ==
=== Literature ===
- Fonseca, Rubem; El seminarista (Cal y arena)
- Kimball, Michael; Lo que queda de nosotros, (Tusquets)
- Nemirovsky, Irene, El caso Kurílov, (Salamadra)
- Olguín, Sergio; Óscura monótona, Tusquets Editores de Novel 2009 Prize (published in Mexico in March 2010)
- Pérez Gay, Rafael; El corazón es un gitano, (Planeta)
- Piglia, Ricardo; Blanco nocturno, (Anagrama)
- Rivera Letellier, Hernán; El arte de la resurrección, Alfaguara Novel Prize, 2010
- Vann, David; Sukkwan Island, (Alfabia); 2010 Médicis Prize
- Velázquez, Carlos; La marrana negra de la literatura rosa, (Sexto Piso), Story book of the year
- Vargas Llosa, Mario; El sueño del Celta, (Alfaguara)
- Wood, Ron; Memories of a Rolling Stone, (Global Rhythm), Biography of the year

== Notable deaths ==
=== January – June ===
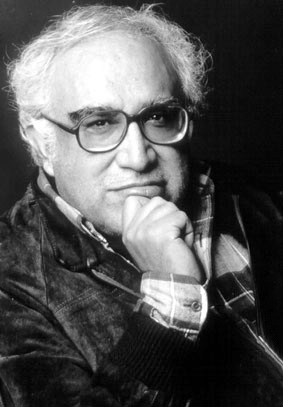
Carlos Monsiváis

- January 7 – Blanca Sánchez, 63, Mexican actress, kidney failure.
- January 9 – Aurelio Fausto Cháidez Chavarín, politician, former municipal president of Culiacán, Sinaloa; murdered.
- January 10 – Moisés Saba, 47, Mexican entrepreneur, helicopter crash.
- January 11 – Roman Catholic priest Gerardo Montaño, 58, who arranged meetings between drug traffickers Ramón Arellano Félix and Benjamín Arellano Félix and the Apostolic Nunciature to Mexico after the assassination of Cardinal Juan Jesús Posadas Ocampo, diabetic coma.
- January 27 — Paula Lazos, painter (b. 1940)
- February 1 – Rodolfo de Anda, 66, actor, thrombosis.
- February 18 – Ramón Mendívil Sotelo, politician PRI, president of Guadalupe y Calvo Municipality, Chihuahua; murdered.
- February 19 – Rafael Muñoz Núñez, 85, Roman Catholic Bishop of Zacatecas (1972–1984) and Aguascalientes (1984–1998).
- February 23 – Manuel Estrada Escalante, politician PRI, president of Mezquital Municipality, Durango; murdered.
- February 25 – Efren Torres, 66, boxer, heart attack.
- February 28 – Carlos Montemayor, 62, writer, stomach cancer.
- March 4 – Hilario Chávez Joya, 82, Roman Catholic Bishop of Nuevo Casas Grandes (1977–2004).
- March 30 – Juan Carlos Caballero Vega, 109, Mexican revolutionary, driver of Pancho Villa.
- April 27 – Alberta Cariño, humanitarian, shot.
- April 28 – José Santiago Agustín, politician PRI, municipal president of Zapotitlán Tablas, Guerrero; murdered.
- April 30 – Carmelita González, 81, actress, pneumonia.
- May 3 – Abel Uribe Landa, politician PRI, former municipal president of Tetipac, Guerrero; murdered.
- May 4 – El Supremo, 59, professional wrestler.
- May 6 – Guillermo Meza, 21, footballer (Pumas Morelos), shot.
- May 8 – Joaquín Capilla, 81, Olympic diving four-time medalist, heart failure.
- May 12 – José Mario Guajardo Varela, politician PAN, candidate for municipal presidency of Valle Hermoso, Tamaulipas; murdered.
- May 25 – Gabriel Vargas, 95, cartoonist.
- June 19
  - Jesús Manuel Lara Rodríguez, 48, politician PRI, Mayor of Guadalupe, Chihuahua; shot.
  - Carlos Monsiváis, 72, writer and journalist, respiratory failure.
- June 26 – Sergio Vega, 40, banda singer, shot.
- June 27 – Édgar García de Dios, 32, footballer, shot.
- June 28 – Rodolfo Torre Cantú, 46, politician PRI, candidate for Governor of Tamaulipas; shot.
  - Enrique Blackmore Smer, politician PRI, Deputy (legislator) from Ciudad Victoria, Tamaulipas; murdered.
- June 30 – Nicolás García Ambrosio, politician PRD, municipal president of Santo Domingo, Oaxaca; murdered.

=== July – December ===
- July 3 – Romero Núñez Montiel, politician (Compromise for Puebla coalition party), candidate for municipal president of Jololalpan, Puebla; murdered. (Note: Compromise for Puebla (Compromiso por Puebla) was a coalition party made up of the PAN, PRI, PRD, PANAL, and Convergence.)
- July 10 – Alberto Herrera Casillas, politician, former municipal president of Tecalitlán, Jalisco; murdered.
- July 11 – Marco Aurelio Martínez Tijerina, 45, journalist, shot.
- July 29 – Ignacio Coronel Villarreal, 56, Mexican drug lord (Sinaloa Cartel), shot.
- August 5 – Francisco María González, 92, Roman Catholic prelate.
- August 7 – Roberto Cantoral, 75, composer, heart attack.
- August 18 – Edelmiro Cavazos, 38, politician PAN, Mayor of Santiago, Nuevo León; shot. (body found on this date)
- August 29 – Marco Antonio Leal García, politician PRI, municipal president of Hidalgo, Tamaulipas; murdered.
- September 2 – Germán Dehesa, 66, journalist, writer and announcer, cancer.
- September 8 – Alexander López García, politician PRI, municipal president of El Naranjo, San Luis Potosí; murdered.
- September 12 – La Fiera, 49, professional wrestler, stabbed.
- September 16 – Helen Escobedo, 76, artist and sculptor, cancer.
- September 19 – José de Jesús Gudiño Pelayo, 67, jurist, associate justice of the Supreme Court of Justice of the Nation, heart attack.
- September 23 – Prisciliano Rodríguez Salinas, politician PRI, municipal president of Doctor González, Nuevo León; murdered.
- September 27 – Gustavo Sánchez Cervantes, politician, interim municipal president of Uruapan, Michoacán; murdered.
- October 8 – Antonio Jiménez Baños, 47, politician PRI, Mayor-elect of Mártires de Tacubaya, Oaxaca; shot.
- October 10 – José de Jesús Gudiño Pelayo, 67, associate justice of the Supreme Court of Justice of the Nation (1995–2010), heart attack.
- October 14 – Carlos Quintanar, 71, Olympic basketball player.
- October 16 – José Felipe García, politician, president of Cruillas Municipality, Tamaulipas; kidnapped October 16, assumed dead.
- October 17 – Rito Grado Serrano, 56, politician, Mayor of Práxedis G. Guerrero Municipality, Chihuahua; shot.
- October 21 – Antonio Alatorre, 88, philologist.
- October 22 – Alí Chumacero, 92, writer and poet, pneumonia.
- November 6 – Jaime Lozoya Ávila, politician PRD, municipal president of San Bernardo, Durango; murdered.
- November 9
  - Gregorio Barradas Miravete, politician PAN, municipal president of Juan Rodríguez Lara, Veracruz; murdered.
  - Omar Manzur, politician PAN, municipal president pro tempore of Juan Rodríguez Lara, Veracruz; murdered.
- November 21 – Silverio Cavazos, 41, politician PRI, Governor of Colima (2005–2009), shot.
- December 3 — Modesta Lavana, indigenous Nahua healer and activist from the town of Hueyapan, Morelos (b. 1929)
