= 2008 in Mexico =

- Decades: 1980s; 1990s; 2000s; 2010s; 2020s
- See also: History of Mexico; List of years in Mexico; Timeline of Mexican history

This is a list of events that happened in 2008 in Mexico.

== Incumbents ==
=== Federal government ===
- President: Felipe Calderón PAN
- Interior Secretary (SEGOB)
  - Francisco Javier Ramírez Acuña, until January 16
  - Juan Camilo Mouriño, January 16-November 4 (died in office)
  - Fernando Gómez Mont, starting November 10
- Secretary of Foreign Affairs (SRE): Patricia Espinosa
- Communications Secretary (SCT): Luis Téllez
- Education Secretary (SEP): Josefina Vázquez Mota
- Secretary of Defense (SEDENA): Guillermo Galván Galván
- Secretary of Navy (SEMAR): Mariano Francisco Saynez Mendoza
- Secretary of Labor and Social Welfare (STPS): Javier Lozano Alarcón
- Secretary of Welfare (SEDESOL)
  - Beatriz Zavala, until December 9
  - Ernesto Cordero Arroyo, starting December 9
- Tourism Secretary (SECTUR): Rodolfo Elizondo Torres
- Secretary of the Environment (SEMARNAT): Juan Rafael Elvira Quesada
- Secretary of Health (SALUD): José Ángel Córdova
- Secretary of Public Security (SSP): Genaro García Luna
- Secretary of Finance and Public Credit (SHCP): Agustín Carstens
- Secretariat of Energy (Mexico) (SENER): Georgina Yamilet Kessel Martínez, starting December 1
- Secretary of Agriculture (SAGARPA): Alberto Cárdenas
- Secretary of Public Function (FUNCIÓN PÚBLICA): Salvador Vega Casillas
- Secretary of Agrarian Reform (SRA): Germán Martínez
- Secretary of Economy (SE)
  - Eduardo Sojo Garza-Aldape, until August 6
  - Gerardo Ruiz Mateos, starting August 6
- Attorney General of Mexico (PRG): Eduardo Medina-Mora Icaza

=== Supreme Court ===
- President of the Supreme Court: Guillermo Iberio Ortiz Mayagoitia

=== Governors ===
- Aguascalientes: Luis Armando Reynoso, (National Action Party, PAN)
- Baja California: José Guadalupe Osuna Millán, (PAN)
- Baja California Sur: Narciso Agúndez Montaño, (Party of the Democratic Revolution (PRD)
- Campeche: Jorge Carlos Hurtado Valdez, (Institutional Revolutionary Party PRI)
- Chiapas: Juan Sabines Guerrero, (Coalition for the Good of All)
- Chihuahua: José Reyes Baeza Terrazas, (Institutional Revolutionary Party PRI)
- Coahuila: Humberto Moreira Valdés, (Institutional Revolutionary Party PRI)
- Colima: Silverio Cavazos, (Institutional Revolutionary Party PRI)
- Durango: Ismael Hernández, (Institutional Revolutionary Party PRI)
- Guanajuato: Juan Manuel Oliva, (National Action Party, PAN)
- Guerrero: René Juárez Cisneros, (Institutional Revolutionary Party PRI)
- Hidalgo: Miguel Ángel Osorio Chong, (Institutional Revolutionary Party PRI)
- Jalisco: Emilio González Márquez, (Institutional Revolutionary Party PRI)
- State of Mexico: Enrique Pena Nieto, (Institutional Revolutionary Party PRI)
- Michoacán: Lázaro Cárdenas Batel, (Party of the Democratic Revolution (PRD) (until 15 February); Leonel Godoy Rangel (Party of the Democratic Revolution (PRD) (from 15 February)
- Morelos: Marco Antonio Adame (PAN).
- Nayarit: Ney González Sánchez
- Nuevo León: José Natividad González Parás, (Institutional Revolutionary Party PRI)
- Oaxaca: Ulises Ruiz Ortiz, (Institutional Revolutionary Party PRI)
- Puebla: Mario Marín Torres, (Institutional Revolutionary Party PRI)
- Querétaro: Francisco Garrido Patrón (National Action Party, PAN)
- Quintana Roo: Félix González Canto, (Institutional Revolutionary Party PRI)
- San Luis Potosí: Jesús Marcelo de los Santos Fraga, (Institutional Revolutionary Party PRI)
- Sinaloa: Jesús Aguilar, (Institutional Revolutionary Party PRI)
- Sonora: Eduardo Bours, (Institutional Revolutionary Party PRI)
- Tabasco: Andrés Rafael Granier Melo, (Institutional Revolutionary Party PRI)
- Tamaulipas: Eugenio Hernández Flores, (Institutional Revolutionary Party PRI)
- Tlaxcala: Héctor Ortiz Ortiz (National Action Party, PAN)
- Veracruz: Fidel Herrera Beltrán (Institutional Revolutionary Party PRI)
- Yucatán: Ivonne Ortega Pacheco (Institutional Revolutionary Party PRI)
- Zacatecas: Amalia García (Party of the Democratic Revolution PRD)
- Head of Government of the Federal District: Marcelo Ebrard (PRD)

== Events ==
- Macrolimosna
- June 1–2: Tropical Storm Arthur 2008
- July 20–21: Hurricane Dolly 2008
- August 3–8: XVII International AIDS Conference, 2008
- September: Riots in the La Mesa Prison
- September 15: 2008 Morelia grenade attacks
- October 6–7: Tropical Storm Marco 2008
- November 4: 2008 Mexico City plane crash
- November 26: Premios Oye! 2008

== Elections ==
- 2008 Mexican elections

== Awards ==
- Belisario Domínguez Medal of Honor - Miguel Ángel Granados Chapa
- Order of the Aztec Eagle
- National Prize for Arts and Sciences
- National Public Administration Prize
- Ohtli Award
  - Eliseo Medina
  - David Coss
  - Monica C. Lozano
  - Patricia Torres-Ray

== Popular culture ==
=== Sports ===
- Primera División de México Clausura 2008
- 2008 Primera División de México Apertura
- 2008 North American SuperLiga
- 2008 InterLiga
- 2008 Carrera Panamericana
- 2008 NASCAR Corona Series season
- 2008 Rally México
- 2008 LATAM Challenge Series season
- 2008 Centrobasket
- 2008 CONCACAF Beach Soccer Championship
- 2008 Mexican Figure Skating Championships
- Homenaje a Dos Leyendas (2008)
- 2008 NORCECA Beach Volleyball Circuit (Manzanillo)
- 2008 NORCECA Beach Volleyball Circuit (Guadalajara)
- 2008 IIHF World U18 Championship Division III co-hosted with Turkey
- 2008 NACAC Under-23 Championships in Athletics
- 2008 AIBA Youth World Boxing Championships
- 2008 FINA Youth World Swimming Championships
- 2008 Women's Pan-American Volleyball Cup
- Mexico at the 2008 Summer Olympics
- Mexico at the 2008 Summer Paralympics

=== TV ===
==== Telenovelas ====
- Fuego en la Sangre
- Las Tontas No Van al Cielo
- Alma de Hierro
- Querida Enemiga
- Cuidado con el ángel
- Juro Que Te Amo
- Un Gancho al Corazón
- En Nombre del Amor
- Mañana Es Para Siempre

== Notable deaths ==
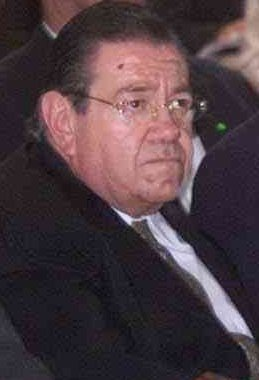
Gilberto Rincón Gallardo

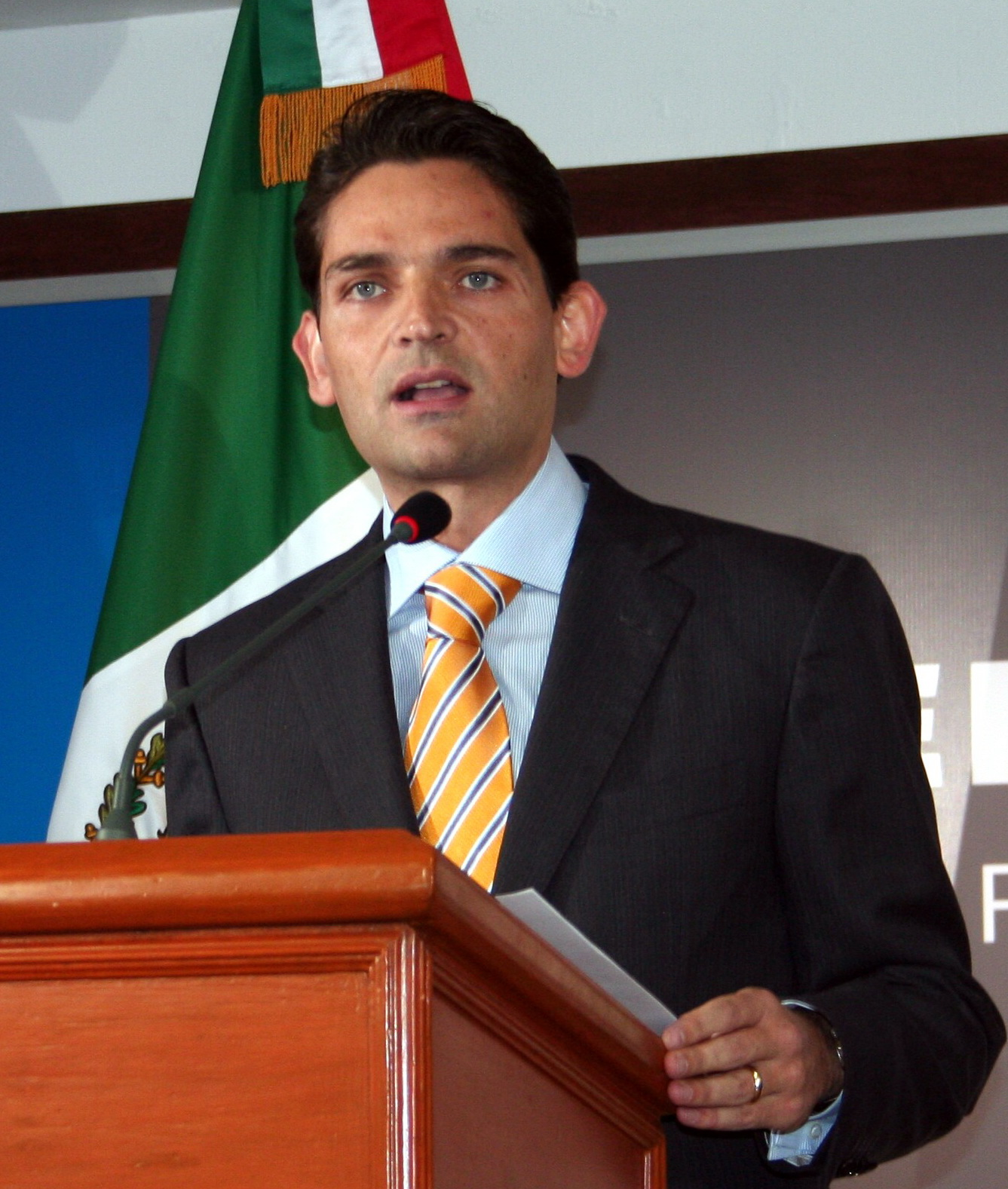
Juan Camilo Mouriño

- January 10 – Andrés Henestrosa
- January 30 – Marcial Maciel
- February 2 – Francisco de Santiago Silva, visual artist
- February 11 – Emilio Carballido
- February 25 – Alan Ledesma, 30, actor, stomach cancer.
- March 22 – Adolfo Antonio Suarez Rivera
- April 8 – Jacqueline Voltaire, 59, actress, melanoma.
- April 10 – Ernesto Corripio Ahumada
- April 14 – Miguel Galvan, 50, actor, renal failure.
- May 8 – Leopoldo Juárez Urbina, politician (Convergence), former municipal president of Cherán, Michoacán; murdered.
- May 24 – Eugenio Garza Lagüera
- June 1 – Marcelo Ibarra Villa, politician PRI, municipal president of Villa Madero, Michoacán; murdered.
- June 4 – Manuel de Jesús Angulo Torres, politician PRI, municipal president of Topia, Durango; murdered (Note: Angulo Torres was kidnapped with his brother at a restaurant on 4 June 2008. His body has not been found and he is not reported as dead.)
- June 21 – Adalberto Almeida y Merino
- July 24 – Juan Manuel Orozco Serrano, politician PRI, former municipal president of Cuautitlán, Jalisco; murdered.
- July 25 — Miguel Ángel Gutiérrez Ávila (born 1955)
- July 27 – Isaac Saba Raffoul
- July 30 – Alejandro Aura
- August 30 – Gilberto Rincón Gallardo
- September 24 – Héctor Lorenzo Ríos, politician PRD, municipal president of Ayutla, Guerrero; murdered.
- September 29 – Miguel Córcega, 78, actor and director, stroke.
- October 4 – Servando González
- October 8 – Salvador Vergara Cruz, politician PRI, municipal president of Ixtapan de la Sal, State of Mexico; murdered.
- November 4 – Juan Camilo Mouriño
- December 2 – Carlos Abascal
- December 12 – Amalia Solórzano, First Lady of Mexico (1934-1940) (b. 1911)
