= List of municipal presidents of Chihuahua =

Municipal president of Chihuahua
- Presidente Municipal de Chihuahua
- Seal of Chihuahua

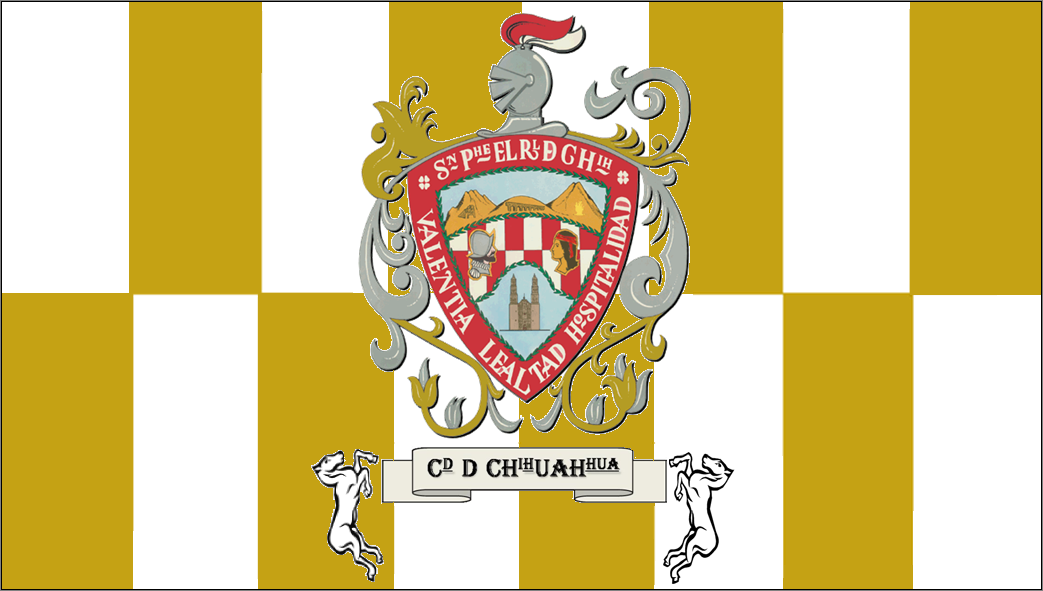
- Chihuahua's flag

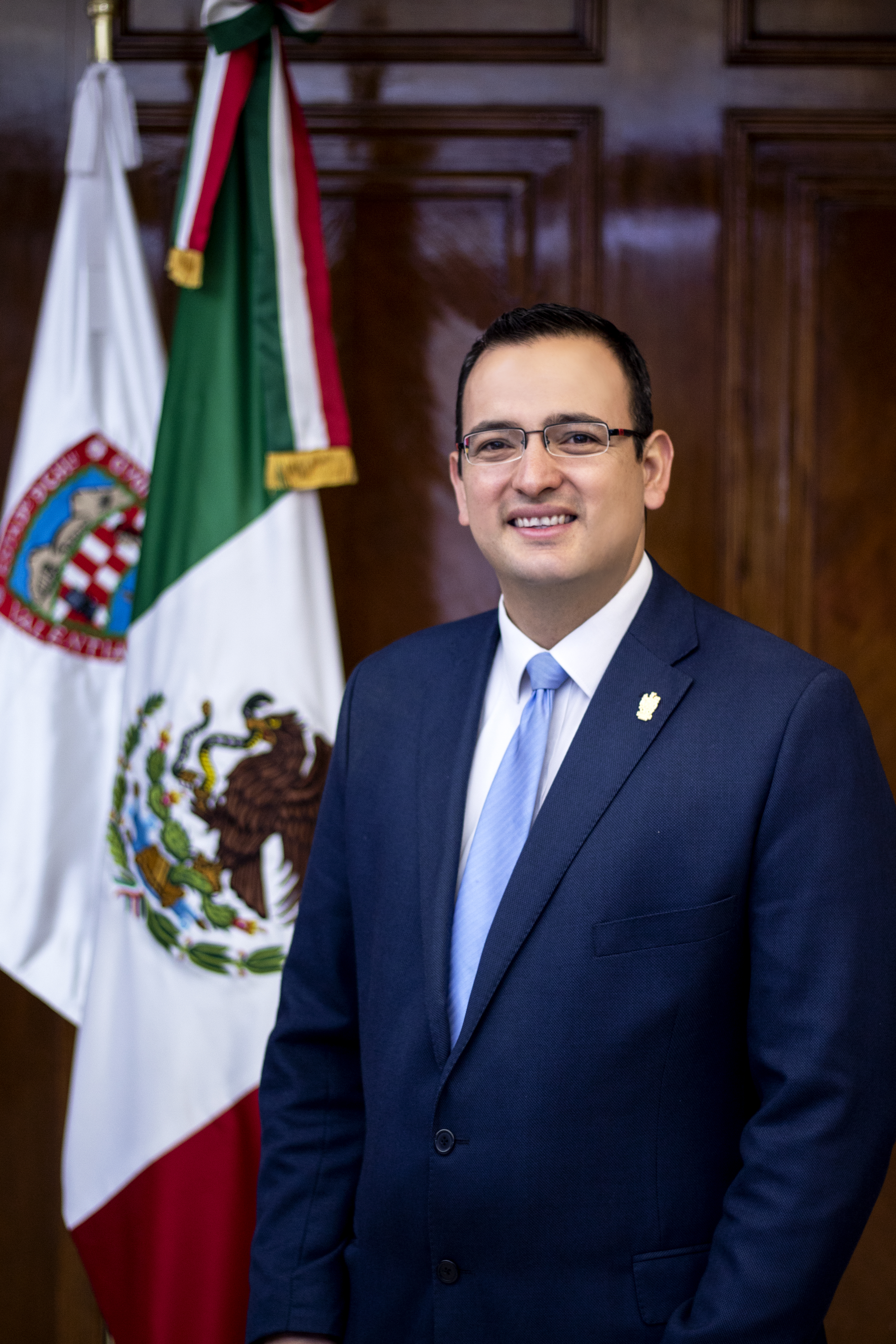
- Incumbent; Marco Bonilla Mendoza since September 10th, 2021
- Formation: 1825
- Website: Municipality of Chihuahua

The Municipal President of Chihuahua (mayor) is the head of local government of Chihuahua Municipality, in the Mexican state of Chihuahua. The mayor's authority includes the state capital, the city of Chihuahua, Chih. Since the city serves as the municipal seat and is home to the vast majority of the municipality's population, the position of municipal president is frequently identified with the city, rather than the municipality.

== List of municipal presidents of Chihuahua ==
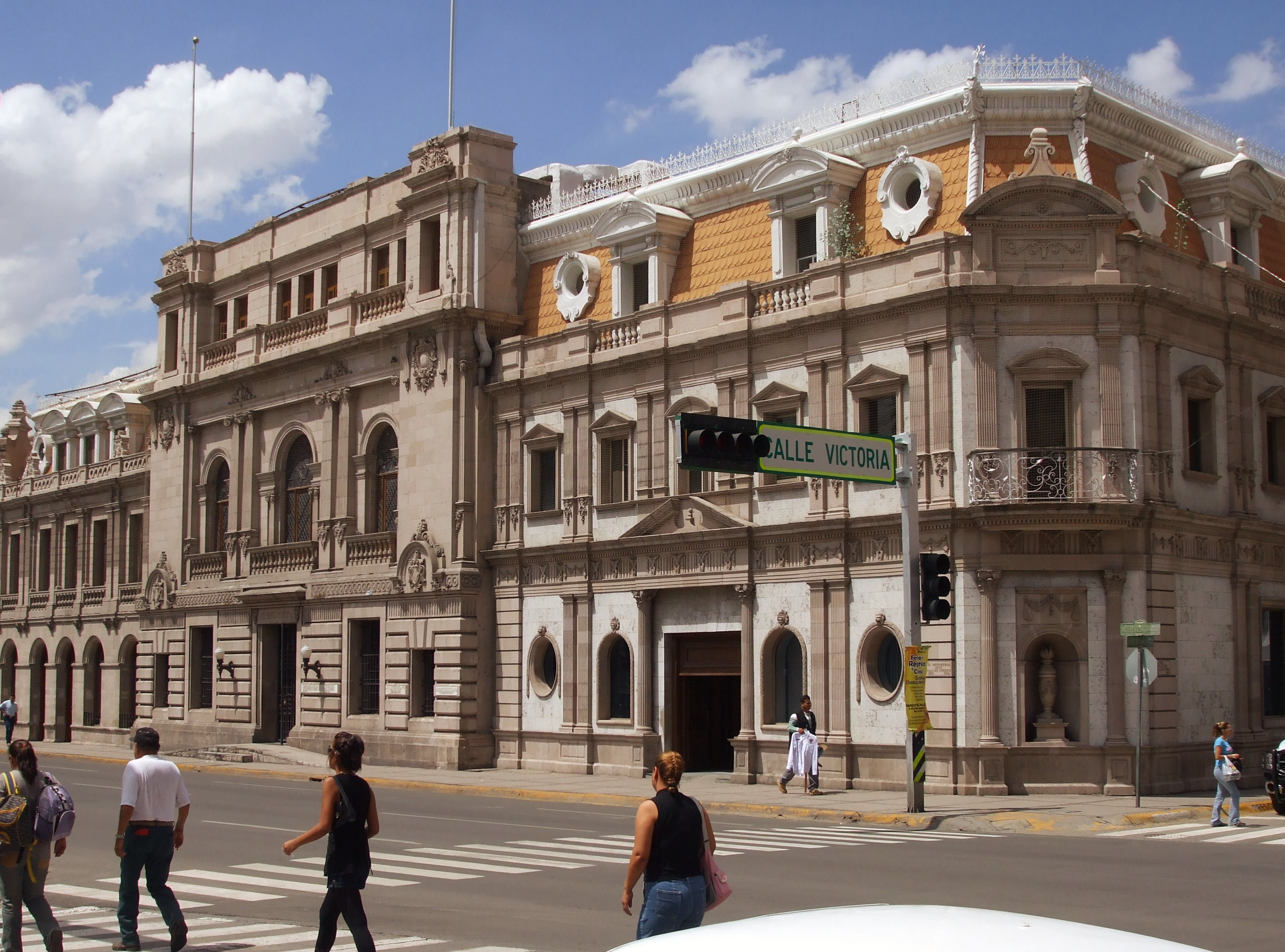
Chihuahua City Hall

- 1974–1976: Oscar Ornelas
- 1976–1977: Humberto Martínez Delgado
- 1977–1980: Luis Fuentes Molinar
- 1980–1983: Ramiro Cota Martínez
- 1983–1986: Luis H. Álvarez
- 1986: Pedro César Acosta
- 1986–1989: Mario de la Torre Hernández
- 1989–1992: Rodolfo Torres Medina
- 1992–1995: Patricio Martínez García
- 1995–1998: Gustavo Ramos Becerra
- 1998–2001: José Reyes Baeza Terrazas
- 2001–2002: Jorge Barousse Moreno
- 2002–2004: Alejandro Cano Ricaud (interim)
- 2004–2007: Juan Alberto Blanco Zaldívar
- 2007–2010: Carlos Borruel Baquera
- 2010: Álvaro Madero Muñoz (interim)
- 2010–2013: Marco Quezada Martínez
- 2013–2015: Javier Garfio Pacheco
- 2015–2016: Eugenio Baeza Fares (interim)
- 2016: Javier Garfio Pacheco
- 2016–2018: María Eugenia Campos Galván
- 2018: Marco Antonio Bonilla Mendoza
- 2018-2021: María Eugenia Campos Galván
- 2021: María Angélica Granados Trespalacios
- 2021-Present day: Marco Antonio Bonilla Mendoza

== See also ==
- Timeline of Chihuahua City
