= 2007 in Mexico =

- Decades: 1980s; 1990s; 2000s; 2010s; 2020s
- See also: History of Mexico; List of years in Mexico; Timeline of Mexican history

This is a list of events that happened in 2007 in Mexico.

== Incumbents ==
=== Federal government ===
- President: Felipe Calderón PAN
- Interior Secretary (SEGOB): Francisco Javier Ramírez Acuña
- Secretary of Foreign Affairs (SRE): Patricia Espinosa
- Communications Secretary (SCT): Luis Téllez
- Education Secretary (SEP): Josefina Vázquez Mota
- Secretary of Defense (SEDENA): Guillermo Galván Galván
- Secretary of Navy (SEMAR): Mariano Francisco Saynez Mendoza
- Secretary of Labor and Social Welfare (STPS): Javier Lozano Alarcón
- Secretary of Welfare (SEDESOL): Beatriz Zavala
- Tourism Secretary (SECTUR): Rodolfo Elizondo Torres
- Secretary of the Environment (SEMARNAT): Juan Rafael Elvira Quesada
- Secretary of Health (SALUD): José Ángel Córdova
- Secretary of Public Security (SSP): Genaro García Luna
- Secretary of Finance and Public Credit (SHCP): Agustín Carstens
- Secretariat of Energy (Mexico) (SENER): Georgina Yamilet Kessel Martínez, starting December 1
- Secretary of Agriculture (SAGARPA): Alberto Cárdenas
- Secretary of Public Function (FUNCIÓN PÚBLICA)
  - German Martínez Cázares, until November 8
  - Salvador Vega Casillas, starting November 8
- Secretary of Agrarian Reform (SRA): Germán Martínez
- Secretary of Economy (SE): Eduardo Sojo Garza-Aldape
- Attorney General of Mexico (PRG): Eduardo Medina-Mora Icaza

=== Supreme Court ===
- President of the Supreme Court: Guillermo Iberio Ortiz Mayagoitia

=== Governors ===
- Aguascalientes: Luis Armando Reynoso PAN
- Baja California: Eugenio Elorduy Walther PAN
- Baja California Sur: Narciso Agúndez Montaño PRD
- Campeche: Jorge Carlos Hurtado Valdez PAN
- Chiapas: Juan Sabines Guerrero, Coalition for the Good of All
- Chihuahua: José Reyes Baeza Terrazas PRI
- Coahuila: Humberto Moreira PRI
- Colima: Gustavo Vázquez Montes PRI
- Durango: Ismael Hernández PRI
- Guanajuato: Juan Manuel Oliva PAN
- Guerrero: Zeferino Torreblanca PRD
- Hidalgo: Miguel Ángel Osorio Chong PRI
- Jalisco: Gerardo Solís Gómez PAN, substitute governor
- State of Mexico: Enrique Peña Nieto PRI
- Michoacán: Lázaro Cárdenas Batel PRD
- Morelos: Marco Antonio Adame PAN
- Nayarit: Ney González Sánchez
- Nuevo León: Fernando Canales Clariond PAN
- Oaxaca: Ulises Ruiz Ortiz PRI
- Puebla: Mario Plutarco Marín Torres PRI
- Querétaro: Francisco Garrido Patrón PAN
- Quintana Roo: Félix González Canto PRI
- San Luis Potosí: Jesús Marcelo de los Santos PAN
- Sinaloa: Jesús Aguilar Padilla PRI
- Sonora: Eduardo Bours PRI
- Tabasco: Andrés Granier Melo PRI, starting January 1
- Tamaulipas: Eugenio Hernández Flores PRI
- Tlaxcala: Alfonso Sánchez Anaya PRD
- Veracruz: Fidel Herrera Beltrán PRI
- Yucatán: Víctor Cervera Pacheco PRI
- Zacatecas: Amalia García PRD
- Head of Government of the Federal District: Marcelo Ebrard PRD

== Events ==
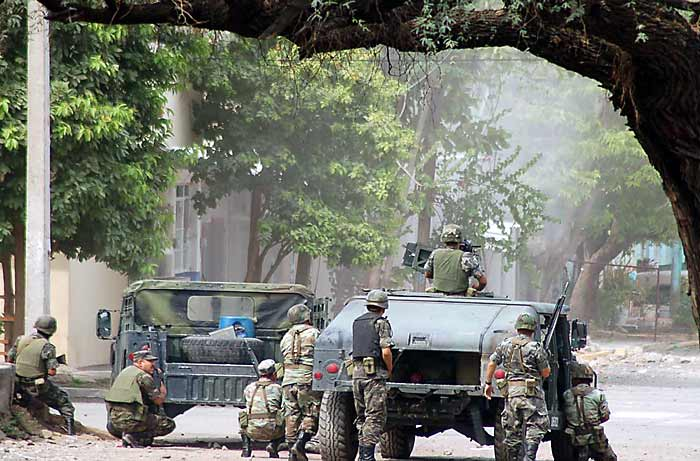
Operation Michoacán: Mexican troops during a gun battle in Apatzingan, Michoacán

- The Tortilla Price Stabilization Pact is agreed on.
- January 2: Operation Baja California
- January 11: The government of the state of Coahuila approves a Civil Solidarity Pact ("Pacto Civil de Solidaridad") that permits same sex civil unions statewide. Becoming the second local government to permit same-sex civil unions in Mexico.
- April 20–26: 2007 tornado outbreak sequence
- May 25: Serial killer Raúl Osiel Marroquín is sentenced to 174 years in prison for three of the four murders he committed against gay men in 2005. His sentence is upgraded to 280 years in prison later and finalized in February 2010.
- May 28: Miss Universe 2007
- June 15: Miss Latin America 2007
- September 20: 2007 Universal Forum of Cultures
- October: 2007 Tabasco flood
- October 6: Nuestra Belleza México 2007
- October 21: Kab 101

== Hurricanes ==
- May 29 – June 2: Tropical Storm Barbara (2007)
- August 13–27: Hurricane Dean Effects of Hurricane Dean in Mexico
- August 30 – September 6: Hurricane Henriette (2007)
- September 25–27: Hurricane Lorenzo (2007)
- October 15–23: Tropical Storm Kiko (2007)

== Elections ==
- 2007 Mexican elections

== Awards ==
- Belisario Domínguez Medal of Honor - Carlos Castillo Peraza (post mortem)
- Order of the Aztec Eagle
- National Prize for Arts and Sciences
- National Public Administration Prize
- Ohtli Award
  - José Cisneros
  - Gerald Richard Barnes

== Popular culture ==
=== Sports ===
- Primera División de México Clausura 2007
- Primera División de México Apertura 2007
- 2007 North American SuperLiga
- 2007 InterLiga
- 2007 Recopa Sudamericana
- 2007 Copa Sudamericana
- Copa Pachuca 2006
- 2007 Rally México
- 2007 NASCAR Corona Series season
- 2007 Gran Premio Tecate
- Homenaje a Dos Leyendas (2007)
- 2007 CONCACAF and CONMEBOL Beach Soccer Championship
- 2007 FIVB Volleyball Boys' U19 World Championship
- 2007 Women's Pan-American Volleyball Cup
- World Chess Championship 2007
- Mexico at the 2007 Pan American Games
- Mexican football transfers 2006–07

=== Film ===
- List of 2007 box office number-one films in Mexico
- January 12 – Fuera del cielo
- February 16 – Morirse en domingo
- March 2 – J-ok'el
- March 9 – Niñas mal
- March 13 – La última mirada
- March 30 – Cuando las cosas suceden
- May 18 – J.C. Chávez

== Notable deaths ==
- January 2 – Sergio Jiménez, actor
- January 17 – Juan Reynoso Portillo
- January 20 – Alfredo Ripstein
- February 7 – Antonio Enríquez Savignac
- March 8 – Black Shadow
- March 12 – Antonio Ortiz Mena, economist and politician, former president of the Inter-American Development Bank
- March 16 – Pablo Emilio Madero
- March 20 – Albert Baez
- May 4 – José Antonio Roca
- June 19 – Antonio Aguilar
- June 19 – Enrique Canales
- July 4 – José Roberto Espinosa
- August 7 – Ernesto Alonso, actor, director, cinematographer, producer, pneumonia.
- October 2 – José Antonio Ríos Granados
- November 29 – Juan Antonio Guajardo Anzaldúa, politician, former municipal president (PAN), Senator (PRD), and Deputy, Río Bravo, Tamaulipas; murdered.
- December 3 – Sergio Gómez, lead vocalist for K-Paz de la Sierra, murdered.

== See also ==
- 2007 Tabasco flood
