= Jesús Manuel Lara Rodríguez =

Mexican politician and murder victim

- Jesús Manuel Lara Rodríguez

Mayor of Guadalupe
- In office 2006–2010
- Succeeded by: TBA

Personal details
- Born: 1962
- Died: June 19, 2010 (Aged 48) Ciudad Juárez, Mexico
- Manner of death: Assassination
- Political party: Partido Revolucionario Institucional
- Profession: Mayor Activist, Politician

Jesús Manuel Lara Rodríguez (1962 – June 19, 2010) was a Mexican politician who served as mayor of Guadalupe, Chihuahua (Note: Located in the extreme northern part of Mexico, near the United States border.) from 2007 until his assassination. He was killed in the ongoing drug war in his country.

Guadalupe is one of Mexico's most dangerous towns. After receiving death threats from Mexican drug cartels, Lara secretly moved his family to nearby Ciudad Juárez, but was murdered there. His death caused the Chihuahua governor to order protection for the state capitol while safety measures were discussed in closed session.

Lara was known for his staunch opposition to the drug lords, in which efforts he worked alongside other mayors of towns bordering the United States, such as the Ciudad Juárez mayor. "His [Lara's] case is the best proof that the fight against the flow of drugs into the U.S. is right at the border."

== Context of his career as mayor ==
The Mexico-US border area is the main battleground in the war among drug cartels for control of smuggling routes leading from Mexico to the US. Since 2006 the conflict intensified as Mexican authorities stepped up their fight against these cartels. Guadalupe, located south of Hudspeth County, Texas and across El Paso, Texas, United States, is in the Valley of Juárez, an area near the border that had seen increased drug violence in 2010. The violence had already struck Guadalupe's politics in February 2009, with the murder of two council members. The arrival of 2000 federal troops to combat the drug gangs in Ciudad Juárez in early 2010 caused a surge in violence in Guadalupe that has killed hundreds of people. Since March, houses and shops were destroyed by arson, and threats by organized crime rings forced out residents. Guadalupe's law enforcement was affected, meanwhile, as its police force was reduced from 40 to 4 officers by the time of Lara's murder.

Lara formed a friendship with the Ciudad Juárez mayor, José Reyes Ferriz, and the two leaders had rallied for other border towns to fight the drug cartels. Both were members of the Partido Revolucionario Institucional (PRI) and active members of the Conferencia de Alcaldes Fronterizos (Spanish: Conference of Border Mayors). Lara's term was scheduled to end later in 2010, after elections in July.

== Assassination ==
Lara's crime-fighting activities earned him several death threats from drug lords. He installed his family in Ciudad Juárez, as a result, meanwhile maintaining his official residence in Guadalupe. Three men shot the mayor in the back on June 19, 2010, in front of his wife and child as he walked to his car, outside the Ciudad Juárez house. The gunmen then fled in a car. Police found 11 bullet shells at the scene of the shooting. In response to Lara's murder, the governor of the state of Chihuahua, José Reyes Baeza, ordered 100 combined federal, state and military troops to guard the state capitol while a closed door session discussed safety measures.

Lara "never asked for protection from the city", said the mayor of Ciudad Juárez, who had not been told by his colleague of the latter's residency in Ciudad Juárez.

== See also ==
- Mexican drug war
- List of politicians killed in the Mexican drug war
