= Guillermo Meza =

Guillermo Meza may refer to:

- Guillermo Meza (footballer)
- Guillermo Meza (artist)
