= Ricaud =

Ricaud may refer to:

== People ==
- Alejandro Cano Ricaud (born 1963), Mexican politician
- James B. Ricaud (1808–1866), American politician from Maryland
- Julien Ricaud (born 1985), French footballer
- Michèle Ricaud (born 1961), French Olympic swimmer

== Places ==
- Ricaud, Aude, a commune in the Aude department, France
- Ricaud, Hautes-Pyrénées, a commune in the Hautes-Pyrénées department, France
