= Rodolfo Torres Medina =

Mexican politician (1949–2025)

Municipal President of Chihuahua
- In office October 10, 1989 – October 9, 1992
- Preceded by: Mario de la Torre Hernández
- Succeeded by: Patricio Martínez García

Rector of the Autonomous University of Chihuahua
- In office October 1985 – September 1989
- Preceded by: Rodolfo Acosta Muñoz
- Succeeded by: Carlos Ochoa Ortega

Personal details
- Born: 1949 Hidalgo del Parral, Chihuahua, Mexico
- Died: April 18, 2025 (aged 76)
- Party: Institutional Revolutionary Party
- Spouse: Claudia Pérez

Rodolfo Torres Medina (1949 – April 18, 2024) was a Mexican politician, lawyer and academic administrator. He served as the rector of the Autonomous University of Chihuahua from 1985 until 1988. Torres, a member of the Institutional Revolutionary Party (PRI), then served as Municipal President, or mayor, of Chihuahua from 1989 to 1992.

== Life and career ==
Torres was born in 1949 and raised in Hidalgo del Parral, Chihuahua. He received his law degree from the Autonomous University of Chihuahua (UACH), later serving as the rector of UACH from 1985 to 1989.

Torres was elected Municipal President of Chihuahua from 1989 to 1992. He oversaw the reconstruction of Chihuahua after the municipality was struck by a tornado and waterspout on September 22, 1990. He also focused on new public works campaigns, including street paving, renovations of public parks and other recreational areas, and enhanced security improvements.

He retired from elected politics following his tenure as Chihuahua's municipal president. He chaired the departments of law and accounting at the Autonomous University of Chihuahua. Torres also served as the director of the Colegios de Bachilleres and the secretary of administrative services for the Congress of Chihuahua, the state's legislature.

Torres Medina died after a long struggle with cancer on April 18, 2025, at the age of 76.
