= Operation Quintana Roo =

Mexican anti-drug trafficking military operation

- Part of Mexican drug war
Date	February 2009 – present
Location	Quintana Roo, Mexico
Result	Ongoing

Belligerents
Mexico	Gulf Cartel	Los Zetas

Commanders and leaders
(Mexico) Andrés Manuel López Obrador (2018–present) (Mexico) Enrique Peña Nieto (2012–18) (Mexico) Felipe Calderón (2009–12) (Mexico) Guillermo Galván Galván (2009–12) (Mexico) Salvador Cienfuegos Zepeda (2012–18) (Mexico) Mariano Francisco Saynez Mendoza (2009–12) (Mexico) Vidal Francisco Soberón Sanz (2012–18) (Mexico) José Rafael Ojeda Durán (2018–present)	Jorge Eduardo Costilla Sánchez (POW)	Heriberto Lazcano Lazcano †; Miguel Treviño Morales (POW)

Operation Quintana Roo (Spanish: Operacion Quintana Roo) is an anti-drug trafficking military operation jointly conducted by the Mexican army and navy in the Mexican state of Quintana Roo. The operation began in early February 2009 after the death of former Brigadier General Mauro Enrique Tello Quiñónez and two other men.

== Background ==
On February 3, 2009. Outside of Cancun, retired Brigadier General Mauro Enrique Tello Quiñónez was killed after spending less than a day on his new job as a special drug-fighting consultant for the Benito Juarez mayor. His dead body was found inside a Toyota pickup truck along a highway that leads to Mérida. Quintana Roo state officials reported that along with the general two other bodies were inside the truck, the two bodies were identified as Lieutenant Julio Cesar Roman Zuniga, who was the general's aide, and the second victim was Juan Ramirez Sanchez, the general's driver and nephew of Benito Juarez municipality mayor Gregorio Sánchez Martínez.

== 2009 ==
- February 7 - Quintana Roo State Governor, Félix González Canto, announces that Army troops and Marines will be deployed into the state especially in the city of Cancun. Since the military was deployed, various raids were being operated inside the city with the help of the Police Special Forces Support (FEPA) an elite unit within the State Secretariat of Public Security.
- February 10 - In a surprise operation, Army troops swooped in and took over a police station in Cancún in connection with the torture and murder of former general Mauro Enrique Tello Quiñónez. Weapons that were assigned to the Police Commander and the rest of his police officers were taken for a registration inspection.
- June 15 - Juan Manuel Jurado Zarzoza aka "El Puma" a lieutenant of the Gulf Cartel in Cancun was captured.
