= Emilio Flores Domínguez =

Mexican politician

- Born: 5 February 1957 (age 69); Chihuahua, Mexico
- Occupation: Politician
- Political party: PAN (1986–2013)

Emilio Ramón Ramiro Flores Domínguez (born 5 February 1957) is a Mexican politician formerly affiliated with the National Action Party (PAN). In the 2006 general election he was elected to the Chamber of Deputies to represent the sixth district of Chihuahua for the PAN during the 60th session of Congress.

He left the party in January 2023 after 25 years' membership.
