= Maurilio Ochoa =

Mexican politician

- Born: 11 November 1973 (age 52); Chihuahua, Chihuahua, Mexico
- Occupation: Politician
- Political party: PRI

Maurilio Ochoa Millán (born 11 November 1973) is a Mexican politician from the Institutional Revolutionary Party (PRI), who most recently served as Secretary of Urban Development and Ecology for the state of Chihuahua. From 2009 to 2012 he served as a federal deputy during the 61st Congress, representing Chihuahua's sixth district.

== Life ==
Ochoa was born in the city of Chihuahua, and between 1994 and 1999, he studied for an undergraduate degree in Financial Administration from Tec de Monterrey Campus Chihuahua. Beginning in 1997, he served as the director of finances and administration at Ochoa Comercial, S.A. de C.V., a Chihuahua-based business that markets food products. Three years later, he also began serving as the director general of Transportadora Mexicana del Norte, S.A. de C.V.

Ochoa also served on many committees and chambers in the 2000s. In 2000 and 2001, Ochoa served on the Coparmex Commission of Young Entrepreneurs; from 2001 to 2002, he served on the national council of CONACCA, the National Confederation of Associations of Wholesale Market Merchants. 2001 also saw Ochoa begin to serve on the board of the National Chamber of Commerce in Chihuahua, with which he remained involved for the rest of the decade. For instance, between 2003 and 2005, he was the Vice President of Exterior Commerce in the organization, then he became its treasurer between 2005 and 2006 and its president from 2006 to 2008. He also served in several capacities with CONCANACO, the national confederation of chambers of commerce, serving on its national council between 2002 and 2003, presiding its Commission on Strengthening the Internal Market between 2003 and 2006, functioning as vice president of the northeast region from 2006 to 2007, and being the national vice president of domestic commerce in 2008 and 2009.

In 2009, voters in the Chihuahua's sixth district, which includes the capital city, elected Ochoa Millán to the Chamber of Deputies for the 61st session of Congress. In his three years in San Lázaro, he was the secretary of the Tourism Commission and served on the Communications, Special for Monitoring of the Sugar Industry, and Special for Export Manufacturing Industry Commissions. That same year, he began studying for an MBA from Tec de Monterrey, Campus Chihuahua.

After his term as a deputy, he became part of the Chihuahua City Municipal Board of Water and Sanitation. In 2015, the state government of Chihuahua tapped Ochoa Millán to become the new Secretary of Urban Development and Ecology in the state. He resigned in March 2016 in order to run for the state congress. In late April, Ochoa formally registered as PRI candidate to run for the Congress of Chihuahua from local district 15. While official counts showed him as losing to Jorge Soto, the PAN candidate, the PRI challenged the results because of irregularities with the number of ballot papers at some polling sites, including so-called "pregnant" ballot boxes; the party alleged that more ballots had been cast than had been supplied to the sites.
