= Patricio Martínez García =

Mexican politician

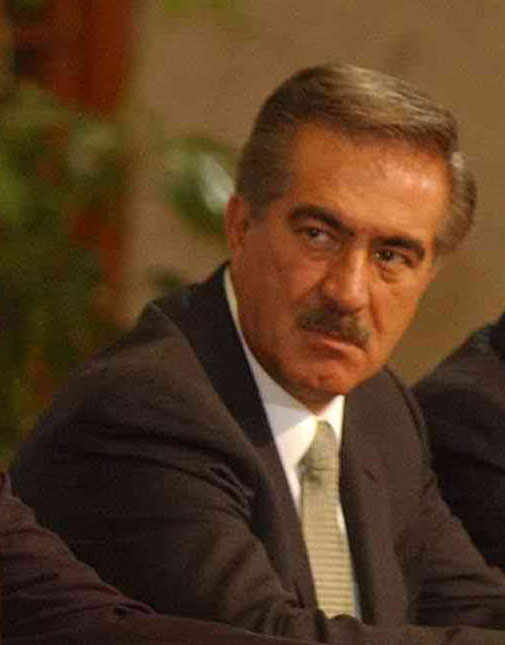

Governor of Chihuahua
- In office 4 October 1998 – 3 October 2004
- Preceded by: Francisco Barrio
- Succeeded by: José Reyes Baeza Terrazas

Member of the Chamber of Deputies for Chihuahua's 6th district
- In office 1 September 1997 – 12 August 1998
- Preceded by: Óscar Villalobos Chávez
- Succeeded by: Xóchitl Reyes Castro

Municipal President of Chihuahua
- In office 10 October 1992 – 9 October 1995
- Preceded by: Rodolfo Torres Medina
- Succeeded by: Gustavo Ramos Becerra

Personal details
- Born: 17 March 1948 (age 78) Chihuahua, Chihuahua
- Party: Institutional Revolutionary
- Spouse: Patricia Aguirre Rodríguez
- Education: Monterrey Institute of Technology and Higher Education (ITESM)
- Profession: Certified Public Accountant

Patricio Martínez García (born March 17, 1948 Chihuahua, Chihuahua, Mexico) is a Mexican politician and member of the Institutional Revolutionary Party (PRI). Martínez served as the governor of Chihuahua from 1998 until 2004.

Martinez was born in the city of Chihuahua. He is married to Patricia Aguirre Rodríguez, and has four children: Patricia, Patricio, César Iván, and Elisa Ivonne. He graduated from the Monterrey Institute of Technology and Higher Education.

He began working as a professor of accounting at the Autonomous University of Chihuahua in 1971. Martinez became the chairman of the Business Coordinating Council of Chihuahua in 1991.

Martinez served as the General Director of Administration for the state of Chihuahua from 1991 to 1992. He was elected mayor of the city of Chihuahua, holding the office from 1992 to 1995. He was further elected to the Chamber of Deputies of Mexico in 1997, where he represented Chihuahua's sixth district during the 57th session of Congress.
