= Carlos Reyes López =

Mexican politician (1957–2026)

Federal deputy for the 8th district of Chihuahua
- In office 2 July 2006 – 5 July 2009

Personal details
- Born: 24 February 1957 Ciudad Jiménez, Chihuahua, Mexico
- Died: 20 August 2026 (aged 69)
- Party: PAN
- Occupation: Politician

Carlos Armando Reyes López (Note: In this Mexican name, the surname is Reyes and the second or maternal family name is López.) (24 February 1957 – 20 August 2026) was a Mexican politician affiliated with the National Action Party (PAN). In the 2006 general election he was elected to the Chamber of Deputies to represent the eighth district of Chihuahua during the 60th session of Congress.

Reyes López died after a long illness on 20 August 2026, at the age of 69.
