= Juárez Municipality, Chihuahua =

Municipality in the Mexican state of Chihuahua

Juárez
- Municipality
- Coat of arms

- Municipality of Juárez in Chihuahua
- Coordinates: 31°44′N 106°29′W
- Country: Mexico
- State: Chihuahua
- Municipal seat: Ciudad Juárez
- Founded: January 5, 1826

Government
  - Municipal president of Ciudad Juárez: Héctor Armando Cabada Alvídrez

Area
  - Total: 4,853 km^{2} (1,874 sq mi)

Population (2015)
  - Total: 1,391,180

Juárez is one of the 67 municipalities of Chihuahua, in northern Mexico. The municipal seat lies at Ciudad Juárez. The municipality covers an area of 4,853 km^{2} (1,874 sq mi).

In the 2010 INEGI Census, the municipality reported a total population of 1,332,131, of whom 1,321,004 (over 99%) lived in the municipal seat.

The municipality is named for 19th-century president Benito Juárez, as is the city of Ciudad Juárez.

== Geography ==
=== Towns and villages ===
The municipality has 147 localities. The largest are:

Name	2010 Census Population
Ciudad Juárez	1,321,004
San Isidro	3,483
Loma Blanca	2,169
Samalayuca	1,474
San Agustín	1,359
Total Municipality	1,332,131

=== Adjacent municipalities and counties ===
- Guadalupe Municipality - southeast
- Ahumada Municipality - south
- Ascensión Municipality - west
- Doña Ana County, New Mexico - northwest
- El Paso County, Texas - north and northeast
