= Doctor Porfirio Parra =

Unincorporated community in Chihuahua, Mexico

Coordinates: 31°25′32″N 106°8′28″W

Doctor Porfirio Parra is a rural community located in Guadalupe Municipality, Chihuahua, Mexico. It had a population of 956 inhabitants at the 2010 census, and is situated at an elevation of 1,100 meters above sea level.
