= 8th federal electoral district of Chihuahua =

Federal electoral district of Mexico

Chihuahua's 8th
- Electoral district of the Chamber of Deputies of Mexico

- Chihuahua's 8th district since 2022

Incumbent
- Member: Alejandro Domínguez Domínguez
- Party: ▌Institutional Revolutionary Party
- Congress: 66th (2024–2027)

District
- State: Chihuahua
- Head town: City of Chihuahua
- Coordinates: 28°38′N 106°04′W
- Covers: Municipality of Chihuahua (part)
- PR region: First
- Precincts: 377
- Population: 468,890 (2020 census)

8th district in 2017–2022

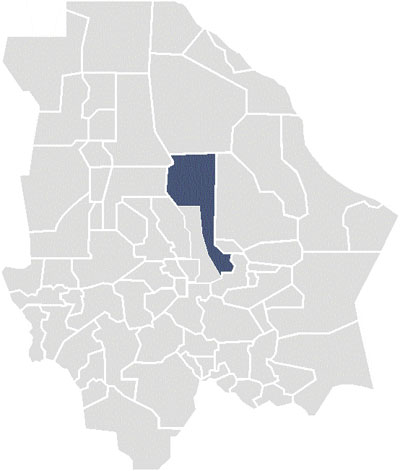
8th district in 2005–2017

The 8th federal electoral district of Chihuahua (Spanish: Distrito electoral federal 08 de Chihuahua) is one of the 300 electoral districts into which Mexico is divided for elections to the federal Chamber of Deputies, and one of nine such districts in the state of Chihuahua.

It elects one deputy to the lower house of Congress for each three-year legislative session by means of the first-past-the-post system. Votes cast in the district also count towards the calculation of proportional representation ("plurinominal") deputies elected from the first region.

The 8th district was created as part of the 1977 electoral reforms. Under the 1975 districting plan, Chihuahua had only six congressional districts; with the 1977 reforms, the number increased to ten. The newly created district elected its first deputy in the 1979 mid-term election.

The current member for the district, elected in the 2024 general election, is César Alejandro Domínguez Domínguez of the Institutional Revolutionary Party (PRI).

== District territory ==
Under the 2023 districting plan adopted by the National Electoral Institute (INE), which is to be used for the 2024, 2027 and 2030 federal elections, the 8th district covers 377 electoral precincts (secciones electorales) in the southern part of the municipality of Chihuahua and the eastern part of the city of Chihuahua.

The district's head town (cabecera distrital), where results from individual polling stations are gathered together and tallied, is the city of Chihuahua. The district reported a population of 468,890 in the 2020 census.

== Previous districting schemes ==
Evolution of electoral district numbers
	1974	1978	1996	2005	2017	2023
Chihuahua	6	10	9	9	9	9
Chamber of Deputies	196	300				

2017–2022

Between 2017–2022 the 8th district covered the east and south of the city of Chihuahua and the south of the municipality of Chihuahua.

2005–2017

Under the 2005 districting scheme, the district comprised the eastern and northern portions of the municipality of Chihuahua, including approximately one-half of the urban area of the city of Chihuahua. The head town was the city of Chihuahua. The other half of the city, and the rest of the municipality, was covered by the 6th district.

1996–2005

Chihuahua lost its 10th district in the 1996 redistricting process. Between 1996 and 2005, the 8th district covered the southern portion of the municipality of Chihuahua, the part south of the Río Chuvíscar.

1978–1996

The districting scheme in force from 1978 to 1996 was the result of the 1977 electoral reforms, which increased the number of single-member seats in the Chamber of Deputies from 196 to 300. Under that plan, Chihuahua's seat allocation rose from six to ten. The new 8th district covered the urban area of Ciudad Juárez in the north of the state.

== Deputies returned to Congress ==
(Mexico) National parties
- Current
- PAN
- PRI
- PT
- PVEM
- MC
- Morena
- PAZ
- Somos
- Defunct or local only
- PLM
- PNR
- PRM
- PNM
- PP
- PPS
- PARM
- PFCRN
- CON
- PANAL
- PSD
- PES
- PES
- PRD

Chihuahua's 8th district
Election	Deputy	Party	Term	Legislature
1979	Mario Legarreta Hernández	Institutional Revolutionary Party	1979–1982	51st Congress
1982	Dora Villegas Nájera	Institutional Revolutionary Party	1982–1985	52nd Congress
1985	Edeberto Galindo Martínez	National Action Party (Mexico)	1985–1988	53rd Congress
1988	Eliher Flores Prieto	National Action Party (Mexico)	1988–1991	54th Congress
1991	José Luis Canales de la Vega	Institutional Revolutionary Party	1991–1994	55th Congress
1994	Héctor González Mocken	Institutional Revolutionary Party	1994–1997	56th Congress
1997	Francisco Martínez Ortega	Institutional Revolutionary Party	1997–2000	57th Congress
2000	José Mario Rodríguez Álvarez (Note: Rodríguez Álvarez died in office in April 2001.); Manuel Narváez Narváez	National Action Party (Mexico)	2000–2001; 2001–2003	58th Congress
2003	Martha Laguette (Note: Martha Laguette requested a leave of absence from Congress to compete in the election for municipal president of Chihuahua in the 2004 election; after failing to win the race, she reassumed her seat in Congress.); Kenny Arroyo González	Institutional Revolutionary Party	2003–2006; 2004	59th Congress
2006	Carlos Reyes López	National Action Party (Mexico)	2006–2009	60th Congress
2009	Alejandro Cano Ricaud	Institutional Revolutionary Party	2009–2012	61st Congress
2012	Pedro Ignacio Domínguez Zepeda	Institutional Revolutionary Party	2012–2015	62nd Congress
2015	Alejandro Domínguez Domínguez	Institutional Revolutionary Party	2015–2018	63rd Congress
2018	Alan Falomir Sáenz (Note: Originally elected for the MC, in April 2021 Falomir Sáenz resigned his membership in the party and joined the PAN and its group in Congress.)	Citizens' Movement (Mexico) National Action Party (Mexico)	2018–2021	64th Congress
2021	Rocío González Alonso	National Action Party (Mexico)	2021–2024	65th Congress
2024	Alejandro Domínguez Domínguez	Institutional Revolutionary Party	2024–2027	66th Congress

=== Congressional results ===
The corresponding page on the Spanish-language Wikipedia contains full electoral results from 1979 to 2021.

== Presidential elections ==
Chihuahua's 8th district
Election	District won by	Party or coalition	%
2018	Andrés Manuel López Obrador	Juntos Haremos Historia	37.8850
2024	Claudia Sheinbaum Pardo	Sigamos Haciendo Historia	45.2454
