= San Agustín, Chihuahua =

Coordinates: 31°30′56″N 106°15′35″W

San Agustín
- Village
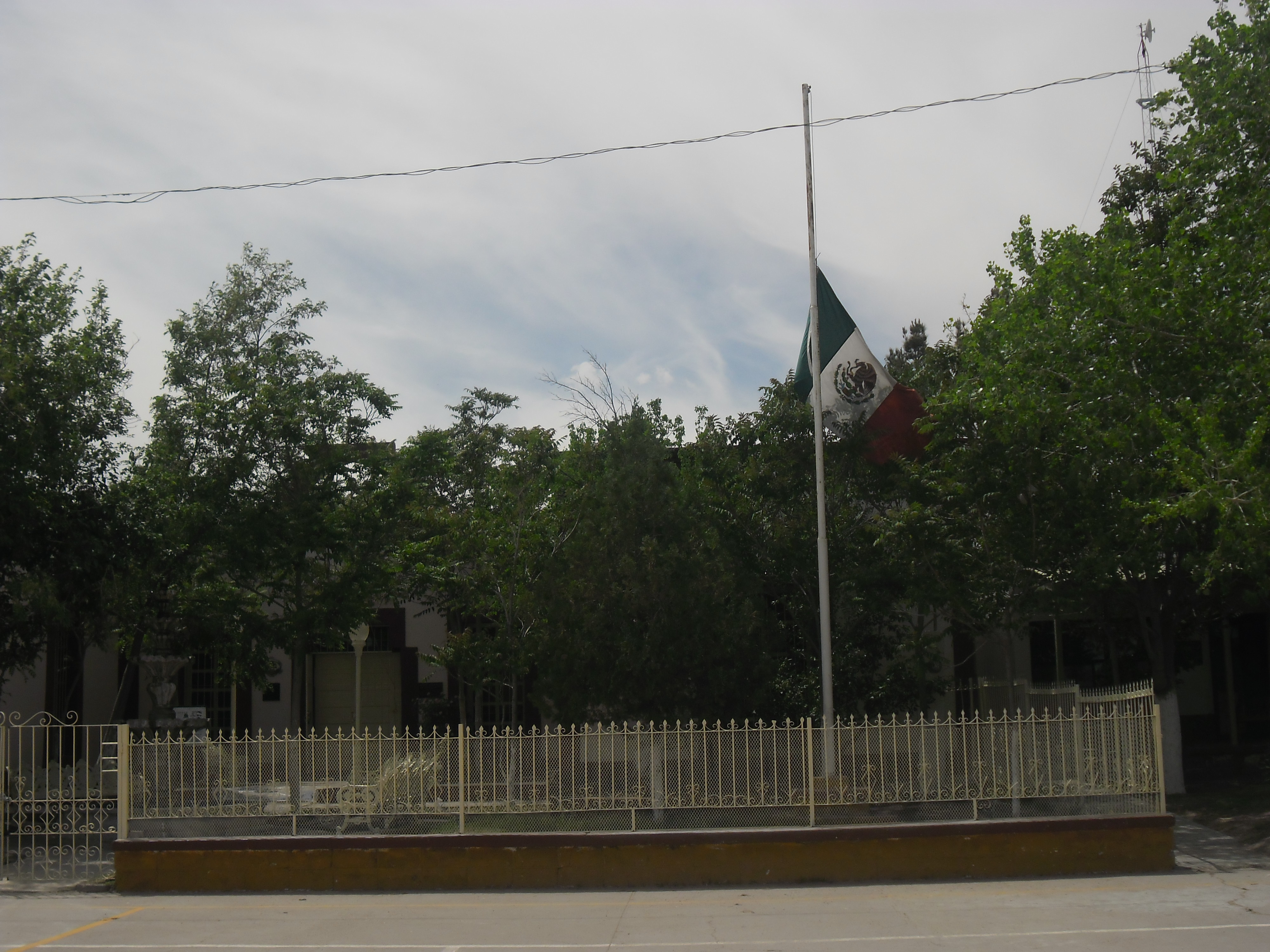
- Museo Regional de San Agustín
- Interactive map of San Agustín
- Country: Mexico
- State: Chihuahua
- Municipality: Juárez
- Elevation: 1,121 m (3,678 ft)

Population (2010)
  - Total: 1,359
- Demonym: Sanagustinense
- Postal code: 32721
- Area code: 656

San Agustín is a rural town located on the eastern boundary of the Juárez Municipality, in northern Chihuahua, Mexico, just to the southwest of the US-Mexico Border. It is the fifth largest locality in the Juarez Municipality with a population of 1,359 inhabitants at the 2010 census, and is situated at an elevation of 1,121 meters above sea level.

== Economy ==
San Agustín is mostly a farming village, with the vast majority of the population being large plot landowners, but with a sizeable percentage being regional laborers from all over the valley. The products grown include cotton, wheat, alfalfa and sorghum. The surrounding lands are fertile and very suitable for growing vegetable crops, including chili peppers, potatoes, zucchini and watermelon.
