= 6th federal electoral district of Chihuahua =

Federal electoral district of Mexico

Chihuahua's 6th
- Electoral district of the Chamber of Deputies of Mexico

- Chihuahua's 6th district since 2022

Incumbent
- Member: María Angélica Granados
- Party: ▌National Action Party
- Congress: 66th (2024–2027)

District
- State: Chihuahua
- Head town: City of Chihuahua
- Coordinates: 28°38′N 106°04′W
- Covers: Municipality of Chihuahua (part)
- PR region: First
- Precincts: 307
- Population: 468,869 (2020 census)

Chihuahua's 6th district in 2017–2022

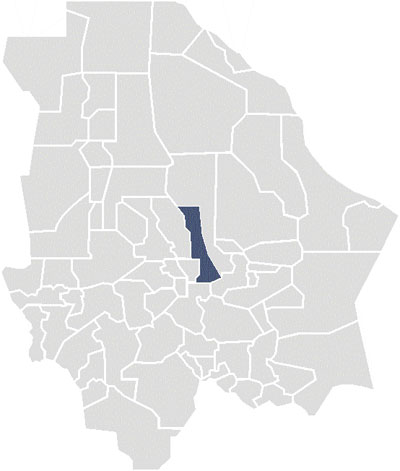
Chihuahua's 6th district in 2005–2017

The 6th federal electoral district of Chihuahua (Spanish: Distrito electoral federal 06 de Chihuahua) is one of the 300 electoral districts into which Mexico is divided for elections to the federal Chamber of Deputies and one of nine such districts in the state of Chihuahua.

It elects one deputy to the lower house of Congress for each three-year legislative session by means of the first-past-the-post system. Votes cast in the district also count towards the calculation of proportional representation ("plurinominal") deputies elected from the first region.

The current member for the district, elected in the 2024 general election, is María Angélica Granados Trespalacios of the National Action Party (PAN).

== District territory ==
Under the 2023 districting plan adopted by the National Electoral Institute (INE), which is to be used for the 2024, 2027 and 2030 federal elections, the district covers 307 electoral precincts (secciones electorales) across the north and west of the city of Chihuahua and its surrounding municipality.

Its head town (cabecera distrital), where results from individual polling stations are gathered together and tallied, is the state capital, the city of Chihuahua. The district reported a population of 468,869 in the 2020 census.

== Previous districting schemes ==
Evolution of electoral district numbers
	1974	1978	1996	2005	2017	2023
Chihuahua	6	10	9	9	9	9
Chamber of Deputies	196	300				

2017–2022

In 2017 to 2022, the 6th district covered part of the west of the city of Chihuahua and the northern portion of the municipality of Chihuahua.

2005–2017

Between 2005 and 2017, the district covered the western portion of the municipality of Chihuahua, including approximately half of the city of Chihuahua. The other half of the city and the rest of the municipality were covered by the 8th district. The head town was the city of Chihuahua.

1996–2005

Chihuahua lost its 10th district in the 1996 redistricting process. Between 1996 and 2005, the 6th district covered the northern part of the municipality of Chihuahua; i.e., it included the part of the city/municipality north of the Río Chuviscar.

1978–1996

The districting scheme in force from 1978 to 1996 was the result of the 1977 electoral reforms, which increased the number of single-member seats in the Chamber of Deputies from 196 to 300. Under that plan, Chihuahua's seat allocation rose from six to ten. The 6th district was located in the eastern central part of the state, centred on the city of Camargo and covering the municipalities of Camargo, Coyame, Delicias, Jiménez, La Cruz, Manuel Benavides, Ojinaga and Saucillo.

== Deputies returned to Congress ==
(Mexico) National parties
- Current
- PAN
- PRI
- PT
- PVEM
- MC
- Morena
- PAZ
- Somos
- Defunct or local only
- PLM
- PNR
- PRM
- PNM
- PP
- PPS
- PARM
- PFCRN
- CON
- PANAL
- PSD
- PES
- PES
- PRD

Chihuahua's 6th district
Election	Deputy	Party	Term	Legislature
1916	No representative sent		1916–1917	Constituent Congress of Querétaro
1917	Vacant		1917–1918	27th Congress
1918	Manuel Chávez M.		1918–1920	28th Congress
1920	Alejandro Velázquez López (Note: In the election of 1 August 1920, Adolfo Valles Baca won in the 6th district; however, on 3 December 1920, the Chamber of Deputies rejected his appointment in favour of Velázquez López.)		1920–1922	29th Congress
1922	Manuel Chávez M.		1922–1924	30th Congress
1924	José Calles		1924–1926	31st Congress
1926	Rafael V. Balderrama		1926–1928	32nd Congress
1928	Práxedes Giner Durán		1928–1930	33rd Congress
The sixth district was suspended between 1930 and 1961 (Note: An amendment to Article 52 of the Constitution in 1928 changed the original provision of "one deputy per 60,000 inhabitants" to "one deputy per 100,000"; as a result, the size of the Chamber of Deputies fell from 281 in the 1928 election to 171 in 1934.)
1961	Carlos Chavira Becerra	National Action Party (Mexico)	1961–1964	45th Congress
1964	José Martínez Alvídrez	Institutional Revolutionary Party	1964–1967	46th Congress
1967	Armando Bejarano Pedroza	Institutional Revolutionary Party	1967–1970	47th Congress
1970	José Refugio Mar de la Rosa	Institutional Revolutionary Party	1970–1973	48th Congress
1973	Ernesto Villalobos Payán	Institutional Revolutionary Party	1973–1976	49th Congress
1976	José Refugio Mar de la Rosa	Institutional Revolutionary Party	1976–1979	50th Congress
1979	Enrique Sánchez Silva	Institutional Revolutionary Party	1979–1982	51st Congress
1982	Diógenes Bustamante Vela	Institutional Revolutionary Party	1982–1985	52nd Congress
1985	Fernando Baeza Meléndez (Note: Baeza Meléndez resigned his seat to contend (successfully) for the governorship of Chihuahua.); Alfredo Rohana Estrada	Institutional Revolutionary Party	1985–1986; 1986–1988	53rd Congress
1988	Arturo Armendáriz Delgado (Note: Armendáriz Delgado died in office on 23 February 1990; he was replaced by his alternate, Villalobos Chávez.); Óscar Villalobos Chávez	Institutional Revolutionary Party	1988–1990; 1990–1991	54th Congress
1991	Jaime Ríos Velasco Grajeda	Institutional Revolutionary Party	1991–1994	55th Congress
1994	Óscar Villalobos Chávez	Institutional Revolutionary Party	1994–1997	56th Congress
1997	Patricio Martínez García (Note: Martínez García resigned his seat to contend (successfully) for the governorship of Chihuahua.); Xóchitl Reyes Castro	Institutional Revolutionary Party	1997–1998; 1998–2000	57th Congress
2000	Francisco Hugo Gutiérrez Dávila (Note: Gutiérrez Dávila resigned his seat to assume a post with the state comptroller's office.); Luis Villegas Montes	National Action Party (Mexico)	2000–2001; 2001–2003	58th Congress
2003	Gustavo Madero Muñoz	National Action Party (Mexico)	2003–2006	59th Congress
2006	Emilio Flores Domínguez	National Action Party (Mexico)	2006–2009	60th Congress
2009	Maurilio Ochoa Millán	Institutional Revolutionary Party	2009–2012	61st Congress
2012	Minerva Castillo Rodríguez	Institutional Revolutionary Party	2012–2015	62nd Congress
2015	Juan Blanco Zaldívar	National Action Party (Mexico)	2015–2018	63rd Congress
2018	Miguel Riggs Baeza (Note: Riggs Baeza switched allegiance from the PAN to the MC after assuming his seat.)	National Action Party (Mexico) Citizens' Movement (Mexico)	2018–2021	64th Congress
2021	Laura Contreras Duarte	National Action Party (Mexico)	2021–2024	65th Congress
2024	María Angélica Granados	National Action Party (Mexico)	2024–2027	66th Congress

=== Congressional results ===
The corresponding page on the Spanish-language Wikipedia contains full electoral results from 1964 to 2021.

== Presidential elections ==
Chihuahua's 6th district
Election	District won by	Party or coalition	%
2018	Ricardo Anaya Cortés	Por México al Frente	44.8671
2024	Bertha Xóchitl Gálvez Ruiz	Fuerza y Corazón por México	53.9445
