= Minerva Castillo Rodríguez =

Mexican politician

- Born: 26 October 1955 (age 70); Chihuahua, Chihuahua, Mexico
- Occupation: Politician
- Political party: PRI

Minerva Castillo Rodríguez (born 26 October 1955) is a Mexican politician affiliated with the Institutional Revolutionary Party (PRI). In the 2012 general election she was elected to the Chamber of Deputies to represent the sixth district of Chihuahua during the 62nd Congress.
