= Pedro Ignacio Domínguez =

Mexican politician

- Born: 9 September 1971 (age 54); Chihuahua, Chihuahua, Mexico
- Occupation: Politician
- Political party: PRI

Pedro Ignacio Domínguez Zepeda (born 9 September 1971) is a Mexican politician affiliated with the Institutional Revolutionary Party (PRI). In the 2012 general election he was elected to the Chamber of Deputies to represent the eighth district of Chihuahua during the 62nd session of Congress.
