= Loma Blanca, Chihuahua =

Coordinates: 31°34′47″N 106°17′56″W

Loma Blanca is a rural community located in Juárez Municipality, Chihuahua, Mexico. It had a population of 2,169 inhabitants at the 2010 census, and is situated at an elevation of 1,120 meters above sea level.
