= Martha Laguette =

Mexican lawyer and politician

- Born: María Martha Celestina Eva Laguette Lardizábal; 14 February 1951 (age 75); Chihuahua, Chihuahua, Mexico
- Occupations: Lawyer and politician
- Political party: MORENA

María Martha Celestina Eva Laguette Lardizábal (born 14 February 1951) is a Mexican lawyer and politician currently affiliated with National Regeneration Movement.

Laguette was a federal deputy from the Institutional Revolutionary Party (PRI) in the 59th session of Congress (2003–2006), representing Chihuahua's eighth district. In 2017, after unsuccessfully seeking a Senate candidacy, Laguette switched parties to the National Regeneration Movement (Morena). In January 2019, she was named the head of finances for the state Morena party in Chihuahua.
