= José de Jesús Gudiño Pelayo =

Mexican jurist

José de Jesús Gudiño Pelayo (6 June 1943 – 19 September 2010) was a Mexican jurist and, from 1995 until his death, an Associate Justice of the Supreme Court of Justice of the Nation.

Born in Autlán de Navarro, Jalisco, Gudiño Pelayo studied law at the Universidad Iberoamericana. He worked as a legal advisor within the federal executive and as a judge at various lower levels of the judiciary, and taught law at the National Autonomous University of Mexico (UNAM). He was nominated for the Supreme Court in 1995 by President Ernesto Zedillo.

Gudiño Pelayo died in London, England, on 19 September 2010 while on vacation with wife. He was 67.

Gudiño Pelayo was noted for his ruling in support for same-sex marriage and adoptions in a predominantly Roman Catholic nation
