= Rosa Rosales =

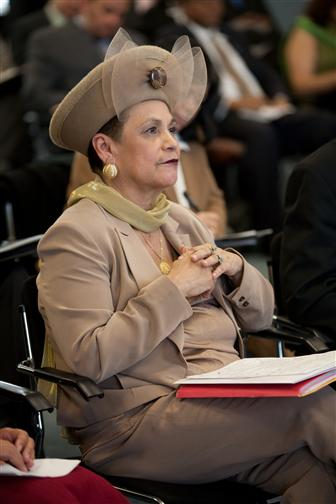
- Rosales in 2009 at the White House
- Education: BA, University of Michigan
- Known for: National President of LULAC
- Board member of: LNESC; LULAC; HACR; NHLA
- Spouse: Dr. Rudy Rosales

Rosa Rosales is an American political activist. She served as the 45th national president of the League of United Latin American Citizens, the largest and oldest Hispanic civil rights organization in the United States, from 2002 to 2010. Rosales advocates for Hispanics across the country on issues of education, health, housing, civil rights, and many other issues affecting Hispanics.
