= Juan Carlos Caballero Vega =

Mexican revolutionary

- Born: June 24, 1900; Chihuahua, Mexico
- Died: March 30, 2010 (aged 109); Mexico
- Military career
- Service years: 1916–1923
- Conflicts: Mexican Revolution

Juan Carlos Caballero Vega (June 24, 1900 – March 30, 2010) was a Mexican revolutionary. Caballero worked as the personal driver and chauffeur for Mexican Revolutionary general Pancho Villa for more than two years.
