= Paula Lazos =

Mexican artist (1940–2010)

Paula Lazos (June 30, 1940 – January 27, 2010) was a Mexican painter whose work has been exhibited in both North and South America and recognized with membership in the Salón de la Plástica Mexicana.

== Life ==
Lazos was born in Cuernavaca, where she remained based for her life and career. In 1954, she graduated a program for art teachers at the Universidad Autónoma del Estado de Morelos. From 1958 to 1959, she took classes in modern dance with Luis Alonso. For a time, she was undecided between a career in painting or in dance.

In 1963, she met painter Dr Atl at the Instituto Regional de Bellas Artes, proposing with him the idea of creating a socialist science center in the town of Tepoztlán. While she had Atl’s support, and was named secretary of the institution, Atl fell ill and died in 1964, and the project withered.

In 1965 she married painter Rafael Mazón at the Cuernavaca Cathedral. Living on Chulavista Street in the city, the couple had one child named Tláloc Rafael.

In 1985, she donated a work to PROMOVOR to raise money for the victims of the 1985 Mexico City earthquake.

In the early 1990s, she and her family were invited to meet writer Andrés Henestrosa, then in San Francisco Ixhuatlán, Oaxaca, where an exhibition of the artist’s work was on display at the Martina Henestrosa Library, which the writer had built in honor of his mother.

Lazos died in Cuernavaca in 2010.

== Career ==
In 1957 she became a founding member of the Instituto Regional de Bellas Artes of Cuernavaca (IRBAC), which supported her work throughout her career. Starting in 1965, she gave classes in painting and origami to children at the institution. Her teaching career extended into kindergarten for much of her career, and from 1975, at the Dirección General de Capacitación y Mejoramiento Profesional del Magisterior, Centro Regional No. 16.

Lazo’s first individual exhibition was at the Trini Gallery in Cuernavaca in 1960. Since then, her work has been exhibited in Mexico, the United States and into South America. Many of her individual exhibitions were in Mexico in venues such as Trini Gallery, Galería 5, Calmecac Gallery, the Salón de la Plástica Morelense, the Palacio de Cortés, the Van Gelder Art Gallery, the Instituto Municipal de Bellas Artes in Cuautla and others. In 1975, a national exhibition of her work was sponsored by the Unión Feminina de Escritoras y Locutoras of Mexico City, for the International Year of the Woman.

In 1968, the Museum of the University of Memphis acquired two of her works, which opened the US market to her.

Lazo’s first recognition was an honorific mention at the V Salón de Pintura at the National Autonomous University of Mexico. Later in her life, she received the Quetzalcoatl Prize from a panel that included the news agency Vibraciones de la Ciudad and the Pinacoteca del Reclusorio Oriente. She donated two works to the latter institution. She was also inducted into the Salón de la Plástica Mexicana where she remained active until her death in 2010.
