= Macrolimosna =

2008 political scandal in Mexico

Macrolimosna is the name utilized by the Mexican press for the 90 million peso donation (roughly 8 million U.S. dollars) to the Catholic Church by Catholic Jalisco governor Emilio González Márquez in 2008.

The donation was to support the building of a sanctuary to honor the Cristero War fighters. Local congresspeople requested the Federal Superior Audit body to determine if the funds had originated from the federation, which would amount to a federal crime. The Secretary of the Interior's office declared itself incapable of auditing the funds. Both the Secretary of the Interior and the Governor of Jalisco are members of the right wing National Action Party.

After public protests, in a private meeting with the cardinal of Guadalajara, Juan Sandoval Íñiguez the governor announced an additional donation of 15 million pesos (roughly 1.3 million dollars) to another Catholic charity organization. He excused the macrolimosna arguing that he was promoting "religious tourism" that would contribute to the economy of the state. He also sent a message to his critics Que chinguen a su madre (the Spanish equivalent of Fuck you). The state's Human Rights Commissioner advised the Governor to apologize. This happened after the Jalisco Human Rights Commission received 403 complaints from citizens in the state. To this Gonzalez responded that he doesn't need to be told what to do.

After several public protests, the Cardinal Sandoval advised the Committee pro-construction of the Cristero Sanctuary to return the 30 million already given. Cardinal Sandoval called the critics of the macrolimosna "radicals".

On June 19, the committee resolved to return the funds. The committee declared that the purpose of the funds was going to be applied to the construction of a hospital, a shelter for visitors and a nursing school, contradicting the Governor's "religious tourism" allegations.

The funds were returned to the government including financial gain that bank gave the church, which was more than half a million pesos.
