= Germán Dehesa =

Mexican journalist, academic and writer

Germán Dehesa (July 1, 1944 – September 2, 2010) was a Mexican journalist, academic and writer.

Dehesa was born in Mexico City on July 1, 1944. He studied both Hispanic literature and chemical engineering at the National Autonomous University of Mexico.

Dehesa wrote six plays and eleven books during his career. His works included Fallaste, Corazon! (You Failed, Heart!), Los PRIsidentes and Las Nuevas Aventuras de El Principito (The New Adventures of The Little Prince). He taught as a professor at the National Autonomous University of Mexico for 25 years. In May 2008, Dehesa was awarded the Don Quixote Prize by the government of Castile-La Mancha in Spain for his article Ah, Que Tiempos! (Ah, What Times!).

Dehesa died at his home in Mexico City on September 2, 2010, at the age of 66. He had published his last newspaper column, Gaceta del Angel (Angel's Gazette), in the Reforma newspaper days before his death.

== Written works ==
- Cuaderno de apuntes
- La música de los años
- Adiós a las trampas
- La familia
- ¡Qué modos!: usos y costumbres tenochcas
- ¿Cómo nos arreglamos? Prontuario de la corrupción de México
- Las nuevas aventuras de El Principito
- No basta ser padre
- Viajero que vas
- Cuestión de amores
- Adiós a las trampas 2
- Los PRIsidentes
- Fallaste corazón
- Cuestión de amor

== Theatrical works ==
- Tapadeus
- El gabinete de Belem
- Borges con música
- Fallaste corazón
- Neruda, no cabe duda
- Zedilleus
- Las Arcas Perdidas
- El pórtico de las palomas
- Pacto con botas
- Monjas coronadas
- Cartas a Santa Fox
- Cuando tenga 64 años
- Cancionero Mexicano Verde, Blanco y Rojo
