= José Antonio Ríos Granados =

Mexican politician and actor (1958–2007)

José Antonio Ríos Granados (December 2, 1958 – October 2, 2007) was a Mexican politician, actor, and filmmaker who served as the municipal mayor of Tultitlán (State of México) from 2000 until 2003. Born in Mexico City, he attended the National Autonomous University of Mexico. he was a member of the National Action Party (PAN).

Ríos Granados became known for a number of political scandals during his tenure as mayor. One of the scandals involved Ríos appearing in a movie alongside Mexican actress Lorena Herrera while serving as a sitting mayor.

Ríos was killed in a small plane crash in Atizapán de Zaragoza on October 2, 2007.

Preceded by Héctor Fragoso Perete	Mayor of Tultitlán, State of Mexico; 2000–2003	Succeeded by Juan Antonio Preciado Muñoz
