= Mario de la Torre Hernández =

Mexican politician (1940–2025)

Mario de la Torre Hernández (24 October 1940 – 28 November 2025) was a Mexican politician affiliated with the Institutional Revolutionary Party (PRI). He was a member of the Congress of Chihuahua (1977–1980) and the Chamber of Deputies (1994–1997, for Chihuahua's 7th), and mayor of Chihuahua (1986–1989). Torre Hernández was a native of Juárez y Reforma, Guadalupe Municipality, and died on 28 November 2025, at the age of 85.
