= Moisés Saba Masri =

Mexican businessman (1963-2010)

Moises Saba Masri (Hebrew: משה סבא מסרי; Mexico City, 1963 - Cuajimalpa, Mexico City, January 10, 2010) was a Mexican businessman.

He studied engineering at the Universidad Anahuac in Mexico and came from a Syrian Jewish family of entrepreneurs.

From June 1999 he was CEO of Unefon, a Mexican mobile telephone operator.

He was also on the Board of Directors of many Mexican companies, including Cosmofrecuencias, a provider of wireless broadband Internet, where he was chief executive. He joined the Board of Directors of several companies within the textile industry and media, was CEO of Textile Industries Ayotla, Alsavisión Group and other private businesses owned by his family. One of its main business was real estate, and in 2006, acquired 5000 sold properties IPAB.

In 1993, he acquired 50 percent of Televisora Radio Centro, SA de CV, the Mexican government bought TV Azteca, SA of C.V. On television, owned 10 percent of the shares of TV Azteca. He negotiated the deal to buy the soccer team, Veracruz, and in 1996 the soccer team, Morelia.

Ecocinemas also operated theaters and had two hotels in Acapulco, the Grand Hotel, and the Crowne Plaza Acapulco. In Israel he had a TV channel.

Until 1998, he was a member of the Board of Directors Communications Controller Mexicana, SA of C.V. (TV Azteca Group) and Theatres Operating Company, Inc. of C.V.

On October 18, 2007, he tried alongside Alberto Saba Rafoul, to buy Aeromexico, but the Institute for Bank Savings Protection was declared the winner of a group of businessmen backed by Banamex.

Saba Masri was president of real estate developer of shopping centers, created the concept of building retail space over the subway stations and at bus stops where crowds pass every day, avoiding the difficulty of bringing the consumer shopping, "we Store customer and the customer to the store "built in the six stations it operates the suburban train operates.

Won through IUZA estate, contracts for the construction of the whereabouts of Zaragoza, where he planned to develop a large shopping center.

In August 2008, in an unusual event, won the dispute to the Securities and Exchange Commission (SEC, for its acronym in English), which withdrew unilaterally and voluntarily requested no charges had been formulated and presented in against him in February 2004 in federal court (having manipulated the stock market on Wall Street in 1999).

On January 10, 2010, Saba Masri died along with his wife, his son, and his son's wife when their helicopter crashed in Cuajimalpa.
