= Edelmiro Cavazos Leal =

Mexican politician (1971–2010)

Edelmiro Cavazos Leal (11 November 1971 – August 2010) was a Mexican politician who served as the Mayor of Santiago, Nuevo León, until his abduction and assassination in August 2010. Cavazos had championed a crackdown on local police corruption and organized crime during his tenure in office.

On August 15, 2010, Cavazos returned home from a public event held at Santiago's town square. He was abducted by fifteen men, who forced him into a car, shortly after arriving home. His body was discovered outside Monterrey on August 18, 2010. He had been handcuffed and blindfolded before being shot.

Mexican authorities in Nuevo Leon arrested seven police officers in connection with Cavazos' murder, including an officer who served as Cavazos' bodyguard. According, to Nuevo Leon Governor Rodrigo Medina and Nuevo Leon state Attorney General Alejandro Garza y Garza, the Los Zetas drug gang had ordered Cavazos' killing after he cracked down on police officers who were secretly loyal to the criminal organization. Cavazos had reportedly disciplined traffic officers who had illegally issued tickets to mountain bikers with cuts in their salaries. Attorney General Garza told reporters in a press conference, "They say that since he scolded them ... they figured he was working for their enemies."

== See also ==
- List of politicians killed in the Mexican drug war
