= Kab 101 =

Oil platform off the coast of Tabasco, Mexico

Coordinates: 18°48′00″N 92°43′08″W

Kab 101 is a Sea Pony-type minimum-facilities light-production oil platform operated by Mexican state-owned oil company PEMEX, and installed about 26 kilometres (16 mi) off the coast of Tabasco, near the port of Dos Bocas, in 1994. The platform was designed by British engineering firm SLP Engineering Limited. The platform also produces the wells Kab 103 and Kab 121. This platform was the site of the accident which eventually led to the death of 22 workers. Pemex would contract two independent studies and one by itself and in an exercise of transparency, posted the reports on its website. On October 31, 2008, PEMEX released the result of the independent studies of the accident.

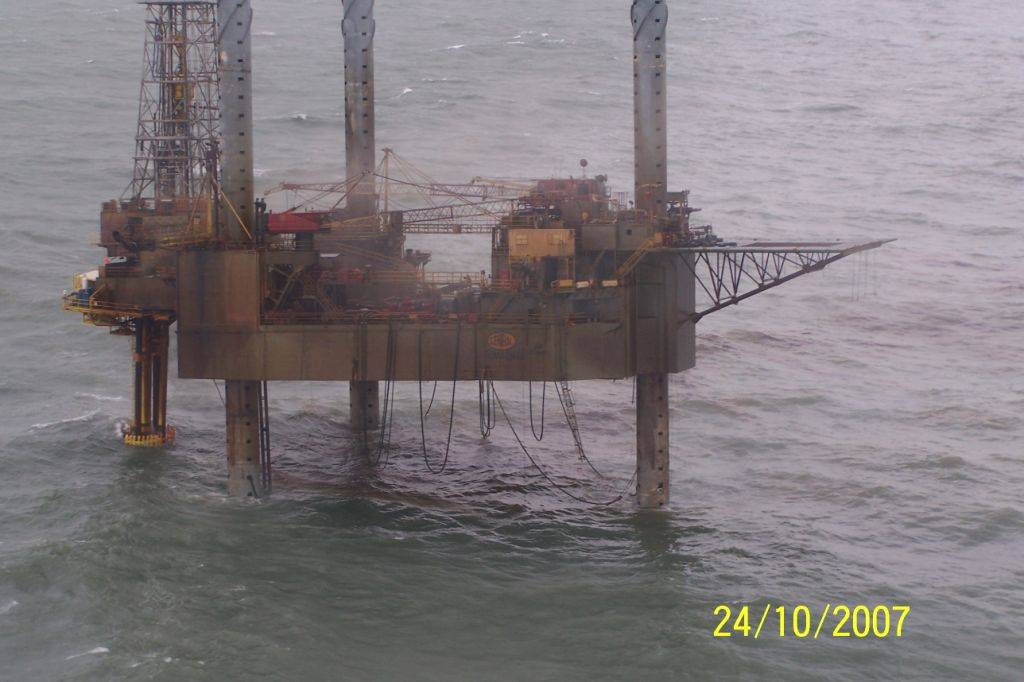
Usumacinta Platform and Kab 101 (under the derrick) the day after the accident.

== Usumacinta accident timeline ==
October 21, 2007: The jackup rig Usumacinta is moved to the location of Kab 101 to prepare for work on the well Kab 103.

October 23, 2007, 0700: The arrival of Cold Front No. 4 with winds exceeding 100 kilometres per hour (62 mph) causes all personnel on the rig to cease operations.

08:00 – 11:00: The Usumacinta begins moving with the 8 metres (26 ft) seas, because its ballast and anchor points have not been properly set.

11:30: The Usumacinta's auxiliary cover below its cantilever collides with the wellhead Kab 121, which begins leaking oil and gas.

11:40 – 13:55: The crew of the Usumacinta attempts to close the sub-surface storm valves for both Kab 101 and the leaking Kab 121, to prevent further danger to the people on board the platform. This is only temporarily successful at stopping the leak from Kab 121.

15:30: The storm valves on Kab 121 fail and hydrogen sulfide is detected, prompting the order to evacuate the platform.

15:45: All 73 people from the platform were accounted for in the two lifeboats, and were wearing life jackets.

== Lifeboat #1 ==
Around 16:13 the lifeboat began to fill with water. This eventually led to the lifeboat crew becoming panicked and attempting to leave the lifeboat, in an attempt to board the M/V Morrison Tide. The lifeboat eventually capsized around 17:28, and a collision between the two lifeboats left most of Lifeboat #1's occupants drifting in the water. Two crew members from the Morrison Tide were lost in rescue operations; one died from injuries and another was lost at sea. Some survivors were also rescued by the M/V Isla Del Torro.

The lifeboat eventually drifted ashore east of Nuevo Campechito with nobody on board.

== Lifeboat #2 ==
This lifeboat started out with poor visibility due to the oil from the leaking well Kab 121. The hatches were opened so the helmsman could see, and to allow for ventilation due to several people complaining of dizziness inside. At 17:42 the lifeboat was struck by a huge wave, and overturned. 33 to 35 people were trapped and had to fight to escape the boat.

The next day Lifeboat #2 reached the shore west of Nuevo Progreso upside down, with 12 survivors on top, and one survivor and four bodies inside.

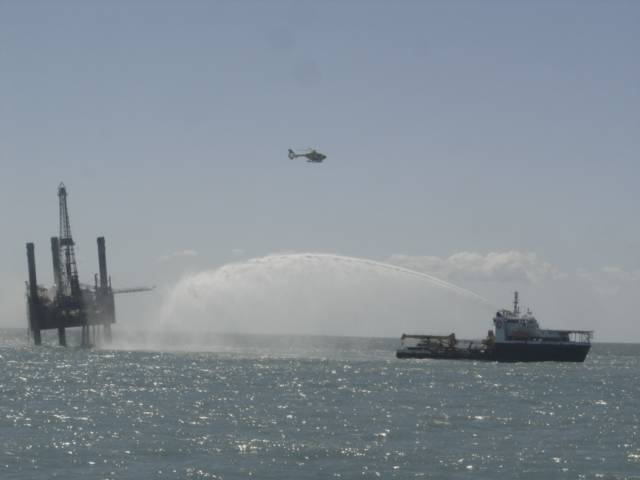
Usumacinta and Kab 101 being sprayed by Caballo de Mar

== Well control and aftermath ==
An early estimate of the oil leak from Kab 121 was 67 cubic metres (422 bbl) per day of light crude. In December 2007 Pemex estimated that 1,380 m^{3} (8,701 bbl) of leaked oil were recovered with another 790 m^{3} (5,000 bbl) remaining in the environment.

On November 13, during attempts to control the leaks resulting from the accident, the well Kab 121 ignited and was brought under control the same day. On the 20th of November, Kab 121 ignited again, this time the fire destroyed the remains of the Derrick and was controlled on December 3.

== Scrappers ==
On August 4, 2008, another fire was extinguished on the Usumacinta. This fire is suspected to have been caused by scrappers attempting to steal from the abandoned rig. This blaze was extinguished by the ships “Isla Guadalupe”, “Isla Cozumel”, “Pionero”, “Conquistador”, and "Deep Endeavour". The Mexican Navy also sent the interceptor "Auriga" to the area at the request of PEMEX.
