= Francisco de Santiago Silva =

Mexican visual artist (1928–2008)

- Born: 26 March 1928; Jerez de García Salinas, Zacatecas, Mexico
- Died: 2 February 2008 (age 79); Mexico City, Mexico
- Education: Academy of San Carlos, UNAM, Polytechnic University of Valencia
- Notable work: Cosmic Rose
- Style: Geometric abstraction
- Movement: Contemporary painting
- Awards: Masters of Fine Arts

Francisco de Santiago Silva (Note: In this Spanish name, the first or paternal surname is de Santiago and the second or maternal family name is Silva.) (26 March 1928 – 2 February 2008) was a Mexican visual artist. He created works such as Cosmic Rose. De Santiago earned a degree in visual arts at the National Autonomous University of Mexico (UNAM) and a doctorate from the Polytechnic University of Valencia in Spain. He later became a Director of doctoral studies and a coordinator at the UNAM.

== Life and career ==
Francisco de Santiago was born at home in Jerez de García Salinas, Zacatecas, on 26 March 1928. He was one of nine children. He spent his adolescence on his family's farm.

At the age of 19, he arrived in Mexico City and enrolled in the Academy of San Carlos, where he studied under Antonio Rodríguez Luna and Luis Nishizawa. There, he learned different painting techniques and various aspects of the arts. He took an interest in contemporary painting, which later came to define his work. He worked with media ranging from encaustic painting to oils and, towards the end of his life, acrylics. His work was characterized by geometric abstraction art and often featured real-world objects.

As an academic, he was the head of the graduate division of the UNAM's National School of Plastic Arts (1986-1990) and the coordinator of the school's high-demand programs.

In Zacatecas, his work is exhibited in notable venues, including the Manuel Felguérez Museum of Abstract Art and the Municipal House of Culture, the latter featuring a room dedicated in his name. His mural El municipio libre is on display at the municipal palace of Jerez de García Salinas, where a tribute was held in 2024 to commemorate the 16th anniversary of his death.

Francisco de Santiago died in Mexico City on 2 February 2008 at the age of 79. His wake, attended by Governor Amalia García, was held at the Francisco Goitia Museum in the city of Zacatecas.

== Exhibitions ==
- "Contemporary Art from the State of Zacatecas" (collective exhibition at the National Museum of Mexican Art, Chicago, United States, 1990)
- "Rumbo a Valencia" (posthumous exhibition of 23 pieces at the Polytechnic University of Valencia, Spain, 2009)

== Gallery ==
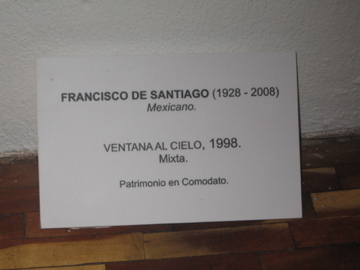
