= Guadalupe, Chihuahua =

City in the Mexican state of Chihuahua

Guadalupe
- City
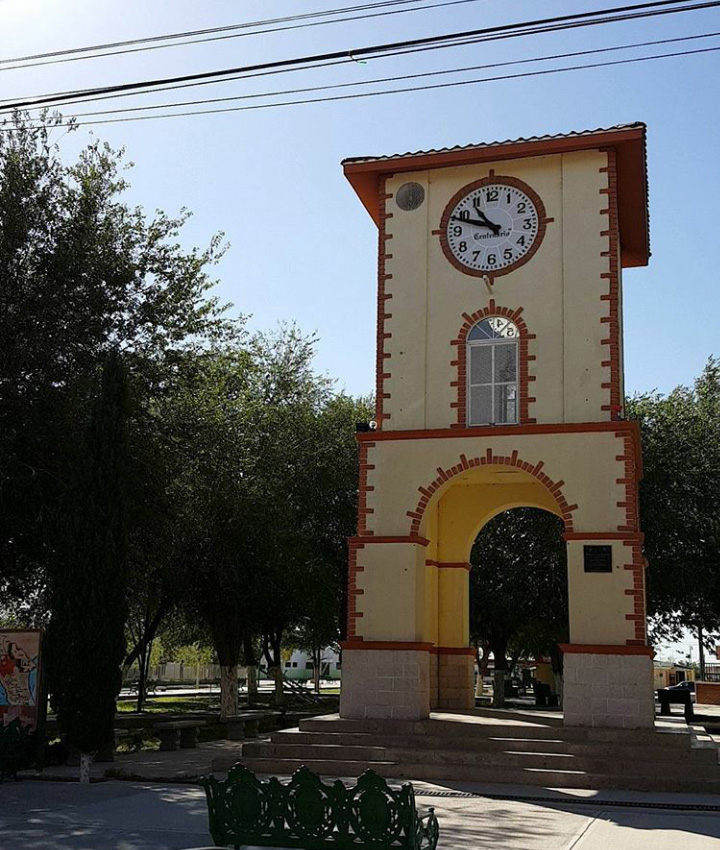

- Location in Mexico
- Coordinates: 31°23′23″N 106°06′05″W
- Country: Mexico
- State: Chihuahua
- Municipality: Guadalupe

Population (2010)
  - Total: 3,022

Guadalupe is a city and seat of the municipality of Guadalupe, in the northern Mexican state of Chihuahua. As of 2010, the town had a total population of 3,022 inhabitants.

Since police officer Ericka Gandara disappeared on 23 December 2010, the town has been left with no police officers. It remains unknown whether she has been kidnapped or not.
