= 2008 CONCACAF Beach Soccer Championship =

2008 FIFA Beach Soccer World Cup qualification (CONCACAF)

Tournament details
- Host country: Mexico
- Dates: 17–19 April
- Teams: 4
- Venue: 1 (in 1 host city)

Final positions
- Champions: Mexico (1st title)
- Runners-up: El Salvador
- Third place: United States
- Fourth place: Costa Rica

Tournament statistics
- Matches played: 6
- Goals scored: 43 (7.17 per match)
- Top scorer(s): (El Salvador) José Agustín Ruiz (5 goals)

The 2008 CONCACAF Beach Soccer Championship, also known as the 2008 FIFA Beach Soccer World Cup qualifiers for (CONCACAF), was the second beach soccer championship for North America, Central America and the Caribbean, held in April 2008, in Puerto Vallarta, Mexico. Mexico won the championship, with El Salvador finishing second. The two nations moved on to play in the 2008 FIFA Beach Soccer World Cup in Marseille, France, from July 17 to 27.

== Participating nations ==
- Costa Rica
- El Salvador
- Mexico (hosts)
- United States

== Matches ==
=== Day 1 ===
April 17, 2008

United States	7–2	Costa Rica
Chimienti 1', 15''; Morales 14'; Albuquerque 18', 25'; Taguinod 21'; Silva 24'	Report	Morales 14'; Brenes 23'

Unidad Deportiva Municipal Agustín Flores Contreras, Puerto Vallarta
Referee: Renato de Carlos (BRA)

April 17, 2008

El Salvador	2–4	Mexico
Lobos 21'; Ruiz 33'	Report	Rosales 6'; Villalobos 7', 24'; Rodriguez 11'

Unidad Deportiva Municipal Agustín Flores Contreras, Puerto Vallarta
Referee: Juan Marcelo Cantti (ARG)

=== Day 2 ===
April 18, 2008

United States	5–6	El Salvador
Chimienti 1'; Albuquerque 5'; Astorga 22'; Taguinod 29'; Morales 30'	Report	Membreño 1', 22'; Ruiz 4', 14', 26'; Torres 15'

Unidad Deportiva Municipal Agustín Flores Contreras, Puerto Vallarta
Referee: Renato de Carlos (BRA)

April 18, 2008

Mexico	7–0	Costa Rica
Rosales 4', 18'; Rodriguez 7'; Plata 15', 33'; Navarrette 26', 34'	Report

Unidad Deportiva Municipal Agustín Flores Contreras, Puerto Vallarta
Referee: Juan Marcelo Cantti (ARG)

=== Day 3 ===
April 19, 2008

Costa Rica	3–4 (a.e.t)	El Salvador
Brenes 4'; Angulo 22'; Morales 23'	Report	Ruiz 1', 29'; Ramirez 14'; Torres 37'

Unidad Deportiva Municipal Agustín Flores Contreras, Puerto Vallarta
Referee: Renato de carlos (BRA)

April 19, 2008

Mexico	2–1	United States
Villalobos 12'; Rosales 19'	Report	Farberoff 14'

Unidad Deportiva Municipal Agustín Flores Contreras, Puerto Vallarta
Referee: Juan Marcelo Cantti (ARG)

== Final standings ==
Team	Pts	Pld	W	L	GF	GA	GD
Mexico	9	3	3	0	13	3	+10
El Salvador	6	3	2	1	12	12	0
United States	3	3	1	2	13	10	+3
Costa Rica	0	3	0	3	5	18	–13

=== Winners ===
(2008) FIFA Beach Soccer World Cup
Qualification (CONCACAF) winners:

Mexico
First title

== Awards ==
Best Player (MVP)
(Mexico) Ricardo Villalobos
Top Scorer
(El Salvador) Jose Ruiz
Best Goalkeeper
(El Salvador) Luis Rodas
FIFA Fair Play Award
Mexico

== Top scorers ==
6 goals

- (El Salvador) José (Agustín Ruíz)

4 goals

- (Mexico) Rosales

3 goals

- (Mexico) Ricardo Villalobos
- (United States) Anthony Chimienti
- (United States) Albuquerque
