= List of Mexican football transfers 2006–07 =

This is a list of Mexican football transfers in the Mexican Primera División during the summer 2006-07 transfer window, grouped by club.

== Club América ==
In:

- Nelson Cuevas Transferred From C.F. Pachuca
- Salvador Cabañas - Transferred From Chiapas
- Fabián Peña - out retirement
- Vicente Matías VuosoLoaned FromSantos Laguna'
- Sithuma Zuma - Return From Arminia Biedfield
- Hugo Ibarra Return From Boca Juniors
- Gabriel Pereyra - Transferred From CF Atlante
- Mario Rodriguez - Transferred From Club Atlas

Out:

- R - Transferred To Blackburn
- ' - Transferred To' C.F. Monterrey
- ' - Loaned To' B.Dortmund
- ' - Loaned To' C.F. Pachuca
- ' - Loaned To' LA Galaxy
- ' - Transferred To' Manchester United
- ' - Transferred To' Barcelona

== Atlante F.C. ==
In:

- Octavio Valdez - Loaned From San Luis
- Israel López - Loaned From Cruz Azul
- Rafael Medina - Loaned From CD Veracruz
- Ariel Gonzalez - Loaned From CD Veracruz
- Alfonso Blanco - Loaned From C.F. Pachuca

Out:

- Daniel Alcantar - On Loan To CF Recreativo
- Olguin - On Loan To Monarcas Morelia
- Gabriel Pereyra - On Loan To Club América
- Herrera - On Loan To Toluca
- Edwin Borboa - Sold To C.F. Pachuca
- Gerardo Ruiz - On Loan To San Luis
- Federico Vilar - Sold To FC Colonia

== Club Atlas ==
In:

- Hugo Rodallega - on Loan From C.F. Monterrey
- Mario Rodríguez - on Loan From Tecos UAG
- Denis Caniza - Transferred From Cruz Azul
- Cesar Pereyra - Transferred From Independiente
- Mauricio Romero - Return From Monarcas Morelia

Out:

- Danilo Vergne - Transferred To Cruz Azul
- Marcelo Macedo - Released
- Rafael Garcia - Return Cruz Azul
- Ulises Mendivil - Transferred To Chiapas
- Sergio Orteman - Return To Independiente

== Guadalajara ==
In:

- Juan Pablo Rodríguez - Transferred From Tecos UAG

Out:

- Edoardo Isella - On Loan To Jaguares de Chiapas
- Christian Armas - On LoanTo Jaguares de Chiapas
- Alejandro Vela - On Loan To Jaguares de Chiapas
- Carlos Salcido - Transferred To PSV Eindhoven
- Johnny Garcia - Transferred To C.D Chivas U.S.A.
- Jorge Barrera - Transferred To Querétaro F.C.

== Cruz Azul ==
In:

- Israel López - Transferred From Club Toluca
- Danilo Vergne - On Loan From Atlas
- Javier Campora - Transferred from Tiro Federal
- Richard Núñez - Return from Pachuca
- Héctor López - Transferred from Dorados
- José Antonio Hernández - Return from Necaxa

Out:

- Javier Restrepo - To Tigres UANL
- Tomas Campos - On Loan To Tigres UANL
- Ricardo Osorio - Transferred To VfB Stuttgart
- Denis Caniza - Transferred To Atlas
- (Mexico) Aaron Galindo - Transferred To Hércules CF
- (Mexico) Francisco Fonseca - Transferred To Benfica
- (Mexico) Alejandro Corona - Transferred To Jaguares de Chiapas

== Chiapas ==
In:

- Alejandro Vela - Transferred From Guadalajara
- Christian Armas - Transferred From Guadalajara
- Oscar E. Rojas - On Loan From CD Veracruz
- Ulises Mendivil - Transferred From Atlas
- Alejandro Corona - Transferred From Cruz Azul
- Leonardo Medina - Transferred From Liverpool de Uruguay
- Herly Alcázar - Transferred From Universidad de Chile
- Javier Saavedra - On Loan From Tigres UANL

Out:

- Carlos Ochoa - Transferred To C.F. Monterrey
- Salvador Cabañas - Transferred To Club América
- Walter Jiménez - Transferred To Santos Laguna
- Alex Diego - Return To UNAM
- Erubey Cabuto - Transferred To CF Querétaro
- Omar Rodríguez - Transferred To N.A.
- Lucas Sparapani - Transferred To N.A.
- Adrián García Arias - Transferred To San Luis
- Alvaro Sarabia - Transferred To N.A.
- Omar Perez - Transferred To Atlético Junior

== Monarcas Morelia ==
In:

- Hector Altamirano on loan From Santos Laguna
- Andres Orozco transfer From Dorados de Sinaloa
- Walter Montillo transfer From San Lorenzo
- José Luis Villanueva transfer From Racing Club de Avellaneda

Out:

- Nestor Silvera transfer From UANL Tigres cancelled
- Iván Moreno y Fabinesi transfer To Vélez Sársfield
- Cristian Nasuti transfer To River Plate
- Damian Ariel Álvarez transfer To Pachuca

== C.F. Monterrey ==
In:

- Sebastián Abreu transferred from Dorados de Sinaloa
- Carlos Ochoa transferred from Jaguares de Chiapas
- Diego Ramírez on loan from CF Atlante
- Leandro Gracián transferred from Vélez Sársfield

Out:

- Reinaldo Navia released
- Oribe Peralta on loan to Santos Laguna
- Hugo Rodallega on loan to Atlas
- Mario Méndez transferred to Tigres

== Necaxa ==
In:

- Kléber Boas on loan From Club América
- Aarón Padilla on loan From Club América
- Joaquin Beltranon loan From UNAM
- Gerardo Galindo transferred From UNAM
- Osvaldo Lucas transferred From CF Atlante
- Victor Gutierrez transferred From Cruz Azul
- Nicolas Olivera transferred From Defensor Sporting

Out:

- Rodolfo Espinoza loaned To CF Atlante
- Ariel López loaned To UNAM Pumas
- Tressor Moreno transferred To CD Veracruz

== C.F. Pachuca ==
In:

- Christian Giménez Transferred From Club América
- Damian Ariel Álvarez Transferred From Monarcas Morelia

Out:

- Nelson Cuevas Return To Club América

== Querétaro F.C. ==
In:

- Jorge Collazo Transferred From Atlante F.C.
- Roberto Nurse Transferred From Atlante F.C.
- Erubey Cabuto Transferred From Jaguares de Chiapas
- Alejandro Villalobos Transferred From Tecos UAG
- Jorge Barrera Transferred From Guadalajara
- Emilio Mora Transferred From San Luis F.C.
- Johan Rodríguez Transferred From Monarcas Morelia
- Jorge Almirón Transferred From León

Out:

- Diego Torres Transferred To N.A.
- Oscar Carrasco Transferred To Monarcas Morelia
- Raymundo Montalvo Transferred To N.A.
- Angel Velázquez Transferred To N.A.
- David Fierros Transferred To N.A.
- Edder de Anda Transferred To N.A.
- Jose Alamo Transferred To N.A.
- Alfredo Jauregui Transferred To N.A.
- Juan de la Cruz Transferred To N.A.
- Eduardo Gomez Transferred To N.A.

== San Luis F.C. ==
In:

- Irenio Soares on loan From Club América
- Reinaldo Navia on loan From Club América
- Miguel Zepeda on loan From Santos Laguna
- Frausto Mendoza on loan From ???
- Oscar Mascorro on loan From Puebla

Out:

- Ariel González on loan To UNAM
- Emilio Mora on loan To Querétaro
- Jesús Mendoza on loan To Atlante
- Héctor Altamirano on loan To Monarcas Morelia
- Ignacio Torres returned To Club América

== Santos Laguna ==
In:

- Francisco Torres - transferred from Club América
- Oribe Peralta - on loan from C.F. Monterrey
- Joaquín Reyes - returns from CD Veracruz
- Walter Jiménez - transferred from Jaguares de Chiapas
- Eliomar Marcón - transferred from Tecos UAG
- Emilio Damian Martinez transferred from Olimpia de Paraguay

Out:

- Vicente Matías Vuoso transferred to Club América
- Rafael Medina transferred to Tecos UAG

== Tecos UAG ==
In:

- Rafael Medina Transferred From Tecos UAG
- Hugo Droguett Transferred From U. de Chile

Out:

- Eliomar Marcón Transferred To Santos Laguna
- Juan Pablo Rodríguez Transferred To CD Guadalajara
- Mario Rodríguez Transferred To Club Atlas
- Alejandro Villalobos Transferred To Querétaro F.C.
- José Alfredo Castillo Transferred To N/A

== Tigres UANL ==
In:

- Mario Méndez on loan from Club Toluca
- Javier Restrepo transferred from Cruz Azul
- Tomás Campos on loan from Cruz Azul
- Emmanuel González on loan from Cruz Azul
- Rolando Zárate on loan from Vélez Sársfield
- Luis Fernando Saritama'from' Club Deportivo Quito

Out:

- Nestor Silvera released
- Carlos Morales on loan to Club Toluca
- Antonio Sancho on loan to UNAM
- Rogelio Rodriguez on loan to UNAM
- Javier Saavedra on loan to Jaguares
- Eduardo Rergis on loan to Atlante F.C.
- Sixto Peralta transferred to Racing Club de Avellaneda
- Júlio César Santos transferred to Olympiacos

== Club Toluca ==
In:

- Pablo Granoche return From CD Veracruz
- Bruno Marioni transferred From UNAM Pumas
- Carlos Morales on loan From UANL Tigres
- Juan Osuna on trial From free
- Edgar "Quesos" Gonzalez called up From Atletico Mexiquense
- Rigoberto Esparza called up From Atletico Mexiquense

Out:

- Israel López transferred To Cruz Azul
- Rodrigo "Rengo" Diaz returned To Lanús

== UNAM ==
In:

- Ariel López on loan From Necaxa
- Antonio Sancho on loan From UANL Tigres
- Rogelio Rodríguez on loan From UANL Tigres
- Ariel Gonzalez on loan From San Luis
- Ignacio Scocco transferred From Newell's Old Boys
- Reinaldo on loan From Grêmio Portoalegrense
- Alex Diego return From Jaguares de Chiapas

Out:

- Bruno Marioni transferred To CD Toluca
- Gerardo Galindo transferred To C.D. Necaxa
- Joaquin Beltran transferred To C.D. Necaxa
- Joaquin Botero transferred To San Lorenzo de Almagro
- Julio Pinheiro transferred To Kyoto Purple Sanga
- Cesareo Victorino To N/A
- Raúl Salinas return To Club América

== CD Veracruz ==
In:

- Cirilo Saucedo - signed from Dorados de Sinaloa
- Ivan Estrada - signed from Dorados de Sinaloa
- Jaime Ruíz - signed from Dorados de Sinaloa
- Hugo García - signed from Dorados de Sinaloa
- David Mendoza - signed from Dorados de Sinaloa
- Alonso Sandoval - signed from Chivas de Guadalajara
- Marinho Ledesma - signed from Pachuca
- Tressor Moreno - signed from Necaxa
- Hector Mancilla - signed from Colo-Colo
- Israel Damonte - signed from Gimnasia y Esgrima de Jujuy
- Mauricio Victorino - signed from Defensor Sporting
- Oscar Razo - signed from Irapuato
- Enrique Badillo - signed from Pachuca
- Hugo Chávez - signed from Puebla
- Carlos Zamora - signed from Monterrey
- Martin Arzuaga - signed from Juniors de Barranquilla

Out:

- Mario Rosales - returns to Tecos UAG
- Martín Calderón - transfer to Atlante
- Pablo Granoche - returns to CD Toluca
- Joaquín Reyes - returns to Santos Laguna
- Hiber Ruíz - returns to Coatzacoalcos
- Gustavo Biscayzacu - transfer to Atlante
- Pablo Quattrocchi - to N/A
- Rodrigo Valenzuela - to N/A
- Oscar Rojas - transfer to Jaguares
- Manuel Vidrio -to N/A
- Francisco Bravo - transfer to Tecos UAG
