= XVII International AIDS Conference, 2008 =

The XVII International AIDS Conference was held in Mexico City, Mexico from August 3–8, 2008. The theme of the conference was "Universal Action Now."

== Topics covered ==
Some of the topics covered at the conference include the following:

- Evidence of abacavir's diminished efficacy in HIV patients with high viral load
- Evidence of abacavir's association with increased risk of cardiovascular disease in certain patients
- Progress on three second generation NNRTI drugs
- A set of three new HIV drugs which have produced undetectable viral load in 90% of treated patients
- TRIO of New HIV Drugs Leads to Undetectable Viral Load in 90% of Treatment-Experienced Patients
- Tenofovir causing nephrotoxicity in persons with HIV
- Raltegravir producing virus suppression in Treatment-Naive Patients with HIV at 96 Weeks
- US HIV Infections increasing at a higher than expected rate

== Attendees ==
25,000 people attended the conference.

The Global Fund hosted a photography exhibition by Magnum Photos showing persons with HIV before beginning antiretroviral drug therapy and then again four months later.

The International Planned Parenthood Federation was promoting the use of evidence-based social services to cross promote HIV education with sexual and reproductive health.

UNIFEM organized many events relating to women's rights and gender inequality.

Doctors without Borders hosted an event about the difficulties people under age 15 have in accessing HIV education and treatment.

== Conference responses ==
The media coverage of the event led to an unprecedented level of publication on HIV topics in Latin America. Many political leaders from all parts of the world made major announcements relating to HIV either immediately before or during the conference.

- Panamanian President Martín Torrijos repealed the law which criminalized sex between men, making Panama the last country in Latin America excluding the Caribbean to decriminalize homosexual acts.
- Mexican President Felipe Calderón announced his intent to make low drug pricing a priority in his government and removed the regulatory barriers which required pharmaceuticals sold in Mexico to be manufactured in country.
- Mexico City mayor Marcelo Ebrard spoke out against homophobia.
- Indian Health Minister Anbumani Ramadoss urged the Indian parliament to repeal Section 377 of the Indian Penal Code.
- China lifted its ban on allowing persons with HIV to enter the country.
- Representatives from 30 Ministries of Health and 25 Ministries of Education in Latin America announced that their strategy for preventing HIV would be to prioritize HIV prevention education and sex education in schools.
- Merck & Co. announced that it would cut the price of efavirenz in Mexico by 40%, making the price per patient move from 777 pesos (US$77.50) to 468 pesos (US$46), and on raltegravir by 30%, making the monthly price change from 9050 pesos (US$903) to 6850 (US$683).
- Spanish Vice President María Teresa Fernández de la Vega announced that Spain was contributing €10.2 million to UNAIDS, of which €3 million would go to IAVI and €1.5 million will go to the IPM.
- The Spanish government announced that its National Health System would now include of lipoatrophy treatment.
- The Coalition of First Ladies and Women Leaders of Latin America on HIV announced their commitment to eliminating the vertical transmission of HIV and syphilis by 2015.

James Chin argued that the conference's efficacy was hindered by attendee's practice of political correctness. Specifically he said that sub-Saharan Africa's HIV prevention programs were being harmed by the incorrect idea that poverty and discrimination rather than risky sex were the forces to be targeted when combating the spread of HIV. In places other than Africa, Chin stated that prevention programs should focus on gay men, injecting drug users, and sex workers and their clients because these groups are at highest risk of contracting HIV.
