= Alejandro Cano Ricaud =

Mexican politician

- Born: 4 December 1963 (age 62); Chihuahua, Chihuahua, Mexico
- Occupation: Politician
- Political party: PRI

Alejandro Cano Ricaud (born 4 December 1963) is a Mexican politician from the Institutional Revolutionary Party (PRI).

== Professional career ==
From 2009 to 2012, he served as a federal deputy in the 61st Congress, representing Chihuahua's eighth district.
