= Guadalupe Municipality, Chihuahua =

Municipality in the Mexican state of Chihuahua

Guadalupe
- Municipality
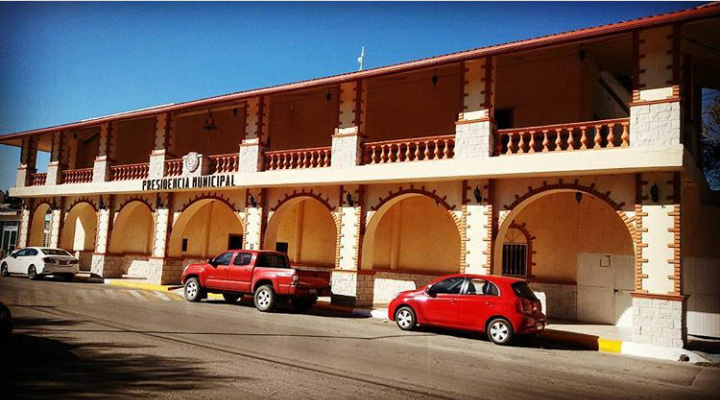
- Guadalupe government headquarters

- Municipality of Guadalupe in Chihuahua
- Interactive map of Guadalupe
- Coordinates: 31°23′23″N 106°06′05″W
- Country: Mexico
- State: Chihuahua
- Founded: 17 March 1855
- Named for: Our Lady of Guadalupe
- Seat: Guadalupe
- Largest city: Guadalupe

Area
  - Total: 6,200.5 km^{2} (2,394.0 sq mi)

Population (2010)
  - Total: 6,458

Guadalupe is one of the 67 municipalities of Chihuahua, in northern Mexico. The capital lies at Guadalupe. The municipality covers an area of 6,200.5 km^{2}.

As of 2010, the municipality had a total population of 6,458,

Other than the town of Guadalupe, the municipality had 195 localities, none of which had a population over 1,000.

== Geography ==
=== Towns and villages ===
The municipality has 80 localities. The largest are:

Name	2010 Census Population
Guadalupe	3,022
Doctor Porfirio Parra	956
Juárez y Reforma	788
Barreales	540
Rinconada del Mimbre	539
Total Municipality	6,458

=== Adjacent municipalities and counties ===
- Ojinaga Municipality - south
- Coyame del Sotol Municipality - south
- Ahumada Municipality - south
- Juárez Municipality - west
- El Paso County, Texas - northwest
- Práxedis G. Guerrero Municipality - north
- Hudspeth County, Texas - north and northeast
- Jeff Davis County, Texas - east-southeast
- Presidio County, Texas - east- southeast

== Crime ==
A narcofosa (mass grave attributed to organized crime) containing the remains of 13 people was discovered in Bravos in June 2018.
