= Guillermo Meza (footballer) =

Mexican footballer (1988-2010)

Personal information
- Full name: Guillermo Ademir Meza Moreno
- Date of birth: 13 May 1988
- Place of birth: Mexico City, Mexico
- Date of death: 6 May 2010 (aged 21)
- Place of death: Mexico City, Mexico
- Height: 1.77 m (5 ft 9 1/2 in)
- Position: Defender

Youth career
- 2002–2007: UNAM Pumas

Senior career*
Years	Team	Apps	(Gls)
2007–2010	Pumas Morelos	17	(0)
2008	UNAM Pumas	3	(1)
- * Club domestic league appearances and goals

Guillermo Ademir Meza Moreno (13 May 1988 – 6 May 2010) was a Mexican soccer defender. He played with Pumas Morelos of Mexico's second division.

== Career ==
Meza began his career in 2002 with UNAM Pumas and joined Pumas Morelos in 2007. He played 17 games for Pumas Morelos and earned three caps with one goal for UNAM Pumas.

== Death ==
On 6 May 2010, Meza was shot in the head, after attackers chased him in a taxi and opened fire.
