= José Reyes Baeza Terrazas =

Mexican lawyer and politician

José Reyes Baeza
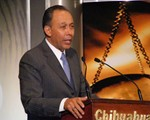

Governor of Chihuahua
- In office October 4, 2004 – October 3, 2010
- Preceded by: Patricio Martínez García
- Succeeded by: César Horacio Duarte Jáquez

Personal details
- Born: 20 September 1961 (age 63); Ciudad Delicias, Chihuahua
- Political party: Institutional Revolutionary Party
- Spouse: Claudia Garza
- Profession: Lawyer

José Reyes Baeza Terrazas (born 20 September 1961) is a Mexican politician and lawyer. In 2004, he was elected Governor of Chihuahua as a member of the Institutional Revolutionary Party for the term ending in 2010. Prior to that, he was Chair of Law at the University of Chihuahua in Chihuahua. He then served as mayor (Municipal President) of the city of Chihuahua from 1998 to 2001 and as a congressman in the federal Chamber of Deputies (Congress).

== Personal life and education ==
José Reyes Baeza Terrazas was born in the city of Delicias, Chihuahua on 20 September 1961, and became a lawyer by studying law at the Autonomous University of Chihuahua, graduating with a special mention.

His wife is Claudia Garza.

== Career ==
Reyes Baeza Terrazas was elected mayor of Chihuahua City in 1988. He served as general director of State Civil Pensions, with the task of providing security and social services to state government workers under Governor Patricio Martínez García from 2001 to 2003.

In 2003 he was elected to the LVIII Legislature of the Mexican Congress, but stepped down in 2004 to run for governor, being elected in July of that year. He became Governor of Chihuahua on 4 October 2004.

In 2010, after Mexican drug cartels agents murdered Jesús Manuel Lara Rodríguez, the governor ordered government troops to guard the state capitol while a closed door session was held on safety.

After his term as governor, on 6 December 2012 President Enrique Peña Nieto appointed him as the head of FOVISSSTE, the social service fund responsible for proving housing support for federal employees. On 15 September 2020, the Financial Intelligence Unit (UIF) freezes the accounts of Baeza Terrazas for embezzlement of MXN $129 million (US$6.14 million) related to the Estafa Maestra ("Master Scam") while Reyes Baeza was the director of FOVISSSTE.

== See also ==
- Creel-Terrazas Family

Political offices
Preceded by Patricio Martínez García	Governor of Chihuahua; 2004 - 2010	Succeeded by César Duarte Jáquez 2010 - 2016
Preceded by Gustavo Ramos Becerra	Municipal President of Chihuahua; 1998 - 2001	Succeeded by Jorge Barousse Moreno
