= Autonomous University of Chihuahua =

Public university in Chihuahua, Mexico

- Universidad Autónoma de Chihuahua
- Former names: Universidad de Chihuahua (University of Chihuahua)
- Motto: Spanish: Luchar para lograr, lograr para dar
- Motto in English: Strive to achieve, achieve to give
- Type: Public university
- Established: 8 December 1954
- Affiliations: ANUIES CONAHEC
- Rector: Luis Alfonso Rivera Campos
- Students: 28,891 (2022)
- Location: Chihuahua, Chihuahua, Mexico; 28.655204°N 106.087289°W
- Campus: Several across the state; mostly urban.
- Website: www.uach.mx

The Autonomous University of Chihuahua (in Spanish: Universidad Autónoma de Chihuahua, UACH) is a Mexican public university based in the city of Chihuahua, Chihuahua, but with several campuses across the state. On December 8, 1954, the State Legislature, with Governor Oscar Soto Maynez, issued the decree 171, which founded the Autonomous University of Chihuahua (UACh). UACh was granted its autonomy in 1968, with the freedom to define its own curriculum and manage its own budget without interference from the government.

== History ==
The Literary and Scientific Institute of Chihuahua was founded on March 19, 1835. In order to promote cultural development in the emerging city of Chihuahua, it offered to the community studies of Latin and Spanish grammar. In the beginning there were 21 students, and between the years 1835 and 1900 around 996 people received education in its classrooms. This is the main university on Chihuahua State

The demand for education in the state grew, so that many students had to leave the entity to Mexico City for their studies. Many of them stayed in that city, and for that reason the State lost many important personalities.

The building occupied by the Literary and Scientific Institute is now employed as the Rectory of the Autonomous University of Chihuahua (UACh).

=== Creation of the Autonomous University of Chihuahua ===
Because of the demand of the school population for open spaces sufficient for education, the State Legislature, with Governor of Oscar Soto Maynez, issued the decree 171, which founded the Autonomous University of Chihuahua (UACh) on December 8, 1954.

In its early years the school served a population of barely a thousand in each school year's enrollment. At that time Mexico's total population stood at only 26 million people, with three quarters of a million in Chihuahua. Back then, Mexico's total enrollment in higher education was 29,000 students.

UACH began with schools of Medicine, Engineering, Law, Physical Education and Pharmacy.

In September 1956 the ranching school was founded, which is the Faculty of Animal Science today.

The School of Accounting and Administration, for which the precedent was the School of Business Brokers, was created on December 3, 1958, as the School of Commerce and Administration. Today this is the School of Accounting and Administration.

The Central Library was founded with 2,000,353 volumes in 1960. That same year, a quartet was created which became the UACH symphony orchestra of today.

The School of Philosophy, Literature and Journalism was founded in July 1963. This is now the Faculty of Philosophy and Literature.

The university founded the School of Agronomy on July 22, 1967. This was later moved to Delicias, as it was the largest agricultural city. Today, this has become the Faculty of Agriculture and Forestry. Chihuahua has more forests than any other state of Mexico.

In 1968 it acquired its autonomy and became the Autonomous University of Chihuahua.

The School of Public Administration and Political Science, located in Ciudad Juarez, was born in 1968. Today this is the Faculty of Political and Social Science.

A fruit farm engineering school began, creating the school of fruit engineering in 1974. This became independent from the School of Chemistry and rose to the rank of a Faculty in 1985.

The Department of Fine Arts, later the institute, and today the Faculty of Arts, was born with the university. The School of Nursing and Obstetrics was raised to a degree college and soon became a separate faculty in 1976.

The construction of the university gym began May 12, 1978, and opened on October 2, 1980. The architectural work was accomplished entirely by UACH engineering graduates.

The School of Dentistry was created in the city of Chihuahua in 1991, and the School of International Economics was located in the city of Hidalgo del Parral the same year.

The current campus has an area of 25 hectares, which originally formed part of an area of 107 hectares donated by Elias Brothers to the State Government, in order to build a sports and recreation park in memory of their mother, Mrs. Emilia M. de Elías. These lands are now occupied by the university, the Sports City, Chihuahua Institute of Technology, the School Carmen Romano de Lopez Portillo, the School of Special Education and the former Pemex storage facility.

== Academic Units ==
Under our Organic Law, the university structure comprises the following academic units:

- Faculties:
  - Arts
  - Agricultural and Forestry Sciences
  - Agrotechnological Sciences
  - Political and Social Sciences
  - Chemistry
  - Accounting and Administration
  - Law
  - International Economics
  - Physical Education and Sports Science
  - Nursing and Nutrition
  - Philosophy and Literature
  - Engineering
  - Medicine and Biomedical Science
  - Dentistry
  - Animal Technologies and Ecology
  - Design and Communication Graphics
  - Psychology

== Accreditation and memberships ==
  - ANUIES : National Association of Universities and Institutions of Higher Education
  - CONAHEC : Consortium for Higher Education in North America
  - CACEI : Council for Accreditation of Engineering Education
  - CONACYT National Council for Science and Technology

== Sports ==
The university has an American football team, the Águilas UACH, which has won four National Conference championships in ONEFA (2004, 2008, 2022, 2023). The team was founded in 1959 and joined ONEFA in 1997.

The university also has a soccer team, called UACH F.C., that plays in the Segunda División de México. In addition, the school has other sports, basketball, inline hockey, martial arts, archery and athletics.

== Motto ==
The university motto, Luchar para lograr, lograr para dar, translates to "Strive to achieve, achieve to give" in the English language.
