= Mariano Francisco Saynez Mendoza =

Mexican Navy admiral (1942–2020)

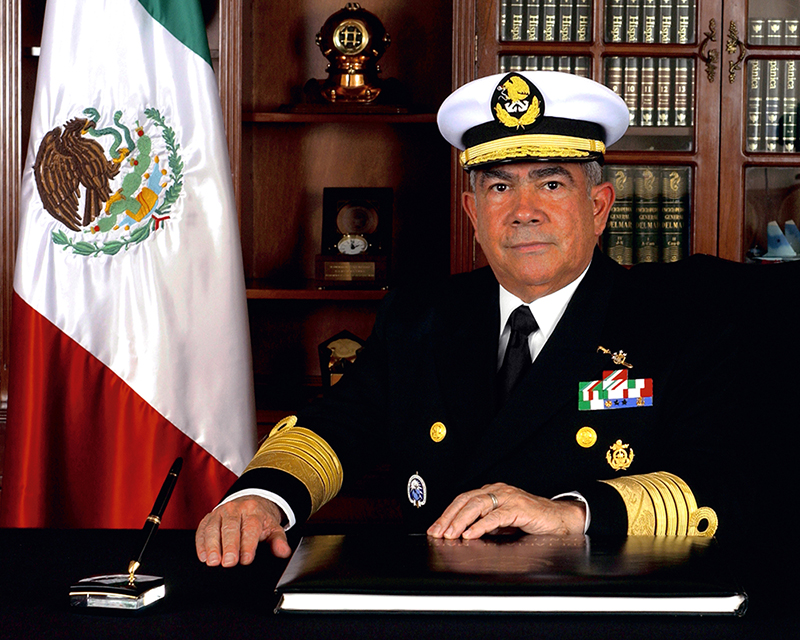
- Born: 20 September 1942; Veracruz, Mexico
- Died: 4 November 2020 (aged 78); Mexico City, Mexico
- Military career
- Allegiance: Mexico
- Branch: Mexican Navy
- Service years: 1964–2012
- Rank: Admiral
- Commands: Secretariat of Navy (2006–2012)
- Conflicts: Mexican drug war

Mariano Francisco Saynez Mendoza (20 September 1942 – 4 November 2020) was an admiral in the Mexican Navy.

== Career ==
Born in Veracruz, Veracruz, Saynez enrolled in the Navy on 22 January 1959 and graduated as a cadet of the Heroic Naval Academy and in 1964 was promoted to midshipman Body. He attended the Naval Studies Center of Mexico (CESNAV) where he performed during the Command and General Staff Diploma, obtaining the latter first with an average of 92.67, also well attended Higher Command and National Mexican Security and the Inter-American Defense College in Washington, DC, conducted the course Defense Superior Continental.

Admiral Saynez served as Secretary of Navy (SEMAR) under President Felipe Calderón (PAN) from 1 December 2006 to 30 November 2012. In 2012, the government of the United States praised him for his work.

Saynez died on 4 November 2020 at the age of 78.

Military offices
Preceded by Marco Antonio Peyrot González	Secretary of the Navy; 2006–2012	Succeeded by Vidal Francisco Soberón Sanz
