= 2009 in Mexico =

- Decades: 1980s; 1990s; 2000s; 2010s; 2020s
- See also: History of Mexico; List of years in Mexico; Timeline of Mexican history

This is a list of events that happened in 2009 in Mexico. The article also lists the most important political leaders during the year at both federal and state levels.

== Incumbents ==
=== Federal government ===
- President: Felipe Calderón PAN
- Interior Secretary (SEGOB): Fernando Gómez Mont
- Secretary of Foreign Affairs (SRE): Patricia Espinosa
- Communications Secretary (SCT)
  - Luis Téllez, until March 3
  - Juan Molinar Horcasitas, starting March 3
- Education Secretary (SEP)
  - Josefina Vázquez Mota, until April 4
  - Alonso Lujambio, starting April 6
- Secretary of Defense (SEDENA): Guillermo Galván Galván
- Secretary of Navy (SEMAR): Mariano Francisco Saynez Mendoza
- Secretary of Labor and Social Welfare (STPS): Javier Lozano Alarcón
- Secretary of Welfare (SEDESOL)
  - Ernesto Cordero Arroyo, until December 9
  - Heriberto Félix Guerra, starting December 9
- Tourism Secretary (SECTUR): Rodolfo Elizondo Torres
- Secretary of the Environment (SEMARNAT): Juan Rafael Elvira Quesada
- Secretary of Health (SALUD): José Ángel Córdova
- Secretary of Public Security (SSP): Genaro García Luna
- Secretary of Finance and Public Credit (SHCP)
  - Agustín Carstens, until December 9
  - Ernesto Cordero Arroyo, starting December 9
- Secretariat of Energy (Mexico) (SENER): Georgina Yamilet Kessel Martínez, starting December 1
- Secretary of Agriculture (SAGARPA)
  - Alberto Cárdenas, until September 7
  - Francisco Javier Mayorga Castañeda, starting September 7
- Secretary of Public Function (FUNCIÓN PÚBLICA): Salvador Vega Casillas
- Secretary of Agrarian Reform (SRA): Germán Martínez
- Secretary of Economy (SE): Gerardo Ruiz Mateos
- Attorney General of Mexico (PRG)
  - Eduardo Medina-Mora Icaza, until September 7
  - Arturo Chávez Chávez, starting September 24

=== Supreme Court ===
- President of the Supreme Court: Guillermo Iberio Ortiz Mayagoitia

=== Governors ===
- Aguascalientes: Luis Armando Reynoso, (National Action Party, PAN)
- Baja California: José Guadalupe Osuna Millán, (PAN)
- Baja California Sur: Narciso Agúndez Montaño (Party of the Democratic Revolution, PRD)
- Campeche
  - Jorge Carlos Hurtado Valdez, (Institutional Revolutionary Party, PRI), until September 15.
  - Fernando Ortega Bernés, (PRI), starting September 16
- Chiapas: Juan Sabines Guerrero, (Coalition for the Good of All)
- Chihuahua: José Reyes Baeza Terrazas (Institutional Revolutionary Party, PRI)
- Coahuila: Humberto Moreira Valdés, (Institutional Revolutionary Party PRI)
- Colima:
  - Silverio Cavazos, (Institutional Revolutionary Party, PRI), until 1 November
  - Mario Anguiano Moreno, (Institutional Revolutionary Party, PRI) from 1 November
- Durango: Ismael Hernández, (Institutional Revolutionary Party PRI)
- Guanajuato: Juan Manuel Oliva, (National Action Party, PAN)
- Guerrero: René Juárez Cisneros, (Institutional Revolutionary Party PRI)
- Hidalgo: Miguel Ángel Osorio Chong, (Institutional Revolutionary Party PRI)
- Jalisco: Emilio González Márquez, (Institutional Revolutionary Party PRI)
- State of Mexico: Enrique Pena Nieto, (Institutional Revolutionary Party PRI)
- Michoacán: Lázaro Cárdenas Batel, (Party of the Democratic Revolution (PRD) (until 15 February); Leonel Godoy Rangel (Party of the Democratic Revolution (PRD) (from 15 February)
- Morelos: Marco Antonio Adame (PAN).
- Nayarit: Ney González Sánchez
- Nuevo León:
  - José Natividad González Parás, (Institutional Revolutionary Party, PRI), until 3 October
  - Rodrigo Medina de la Cruz, (Institutional Revolutionary Party, PRI), from 3 October
- Oaxaca: Ulises Ruiz Ortiz, (Institutional Revolutionary Party PRI)
- Puebla: Mario Marín Torres, (Institutional Revolutionary Party PRI)
- Querétaro: Francisco Garrido Patrón (National Action Party, PAN)
- Quintana Roo: Félix González Canto, (Institutional Revolutionary Party PRI)
- San Luis Potosí:
  - Jesús Marcelo de los Santos Fraga, (Institutional Revolutionary Party, PRI), until 25 September
  - Fernando Toranzo Fernández, Fernando Toranzo Fernández, (Institutional Revolutionary Party, PRI), from 25 September
- Sinaloa: Jesús Aguilar Padilla, (Institutional Revolutionary Party, PRI)
- Sonora:
  - Eduardo Bours, (Institutional Revolutionary Party, PRI), until 12 September
  - Guillermo Padrés Elías, (National Action Party, PAN), from 12 September
- Tabasco: Andrés Rafael Granier Melo, (Institutional Revolutionary Party PRI)
- Tamaulipas: Eugenio Hernández Flores, (Institutional Revolutionary Party PRI)
- Tlaxcala: Héctor Ortiz Ortiz (National Action Party, PAN)
- Veracruz: Fidel Herrera Beltrán (Institutional Revolutionary Party PRI)
- Yucatán: Ivonne Ortega Pacheco (Institutional Revolutionary Party PRI)
- Zacatecas: Amalia García (Party of the Democratic Revolution PRD)
- Head of Government of the Federal District: Marcelo Ebrard (PRD)

== Events ==
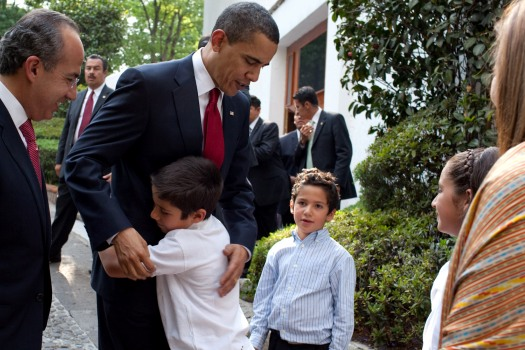
United States President Barack Obama bids farewell to the family of Mexican President Felipe Calderon following their meeting in Mexico City on April 16, 2009.

- January– A Swine flu pandemic occur right after the U.S. first case of the Flu.
- February 11 – Mexico's National Institute of Anthropology and History announces the discovery of a 16th-century mass grave at the Tlatelolco archaeological site in Mexico City.
- March 4 – 2009 Mexico prison riot: A riot at a prison near Ciudad Juárez, Mexico, kills at least 20 inmates and injures seven others.
- March 17 – At least 11 people are killed and four injured in a bus accident outside Saltillo, Coahuila, Mexico.
- April 10 – Mexico City closes freshwater supplies to 5,000,000 people for 36 hours to combat shortages.
- April 19 – Eight corrections officers are killed in an ambush during a prisoner transfer in Nayarit, Mexico.
- April 25 – Mexico's government declares a state of emergency to combat the outbreak of swine influenza.
- April 27 – 2009 Guerrero earthquake: A 5.6-magnitude earthquake strikes near Chilpancingo, Guerrero, Mexico.
- May 16 – The Gulf drug cartel liberates 59 inmates from a prison in Zacatecas, Mexico.
- May 22 – A 5.7-magnitude earthquake strikes Chiautla de Tapia, Puebla, Mexico.
- June 6 – 2009 Hermosillo daycare center fire: a fire at a day-care center kills at least 40 people in Hermosillo, Mexico.
- July 3 – A 6.0 magnitude earthquake centred in the Sea of Cortez shakes western Mexico.
- July 5 – Mexico holds its legislative election.
- August 3 – Several earthquakes, including one of 6.9 magnitude, hit northwestern Mexico.
- August 7 – 2009 Guanajuato and Hidalgo shootings: Shootouts leave at least 11 dead in the escalating violence since Mexico's continuing national crackdown on the illegal drug trade.
- August 4 – President Felipe Calderon receives Honduras President Manuel Zelaya in Los Pinos after a coup d'etat.
- August 15 – A prison riot in the Mexican state of Durango leaves at least 19 people dead and 20 injured.
- August 21 – Mexico decriminalises the use of small amounts of marijuana, cocaine, heroin and other drugs for "personal use".
- September 9 – Aeroméxico Flight 576, a Boeing 737 carrying 104 people, is hijacked shortly after take-off from Cancún, and forced to land at Mexico City International Airport.
- September 16 – Gunmen kill 10 people at a drug rehabilitation clinic in Mexico.
- December 16 – Mexican drug lord Arturo Beltrán Leyva, leader of the Beltrán-Leyva Cartel, is killed by personnel of the Mexican Navy during a shootout in Cuernavaca, Morelos.
- December 21 – Mexico City's Legislative Assembly legalizes same-sex marriage and LGBT adoption.
- December 25 – The death by gunshot wound of Expresiones de Tulum journalist Alberto Velázquez, the 12th journalist to be killed in Mexico in 2009, is announced.

== Awards ==
- Belisario Domínguez Medal of Honor – Javier Barros Sierra (post mortem)
- Order of the Aztec Eagle
- National Prize for Arts and Sciences
- National Public Administration Prize
- Ohtli Award
  - Viola Casares
  - Jimmie V. Reyna
  - Esperanza Andrade
  - Gil Cedillo
  - Gloria Molina
  - Enrique Morones
  - Janet Murguía

== Popular culture ==
=== Sports ===
- 2009 Primera División de México Clausura
- 2009 Primera División de México Apertura
- 2009 InterLiga
- 2009 CONCACAF Champions League Finals
- 2009 CONCACAF U-17 Championship
- 2009 CONCACAF Beach Soccer Championship
- Homenaje a Dos Leyendas (2009)
- 2009 FIA WTCC Race of Mexico
- 2009 LATAM Challenge Series season
- 2009 NASCAR Corona Series season
- 2009 NASCAR Mini Stock Series season
- 2009 Chihuahua Express
- 2009 Carrera Panamericana
- 2009 International Rally of Nations
- 2009 NORCECA Beach Volleyball Circuit (Manzanillo)
- 2009 NORCECA Beach Volleyball Circuit (Puerto Vallarta)
- 2009 NORCECA Beach Volleyball Circuit (Tijuana)
- 2009 Mexican Figure Skating Championships
- 2009 FIVB Women's Junior World Championship
- Mexico at the 2009 World Championships in Athletics
- 2009 Caribbean Series

=== Music ===
- List of number-one albums of 2009 (Mexico)

=== Film ===
- All inclusive
- Alamar
- Amar a morir
- Cabeza de Buda
- Otra película de huevos y un pollo
- Tlatelolco: México 68
- Recién Cazado
- Sólo quiero caminar
- Secretos de familia
- Nikté

=== TV ===
==== Telenovelas ====
- Un gancho al corazón
- Mañana es para siempre
- Atrévete a soñar
- Verano de amor
- Mi pecado
- Camaleones
- Hasta que el dinero nos separe
- Sortilegio
- Alma de Hierro
- Pasión Morena
- Eternamente tuya
- Pobre diabla
- Los exitosos Pérez
- Corazón salvaje
- Mujer comprada

== Notable deaths ==
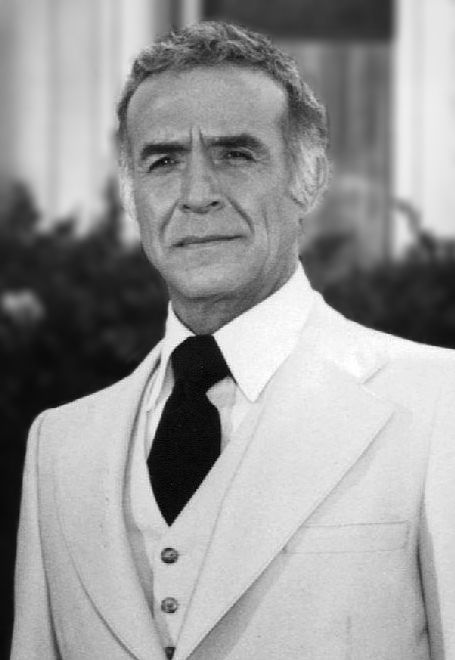
Ricardo Montalbán

- January 11 – Ricardo Martínez de Hoyos, 90, Mexican painter, pneumonia.
- January 14 – Ricardo Montalbán, 88, Mexican-born American actor (Fantasy Island, Star Trek II: The Wrath of Khan), heart failure.
- February 6 – Claudio Reyes Núñez, politician PRI, president of Otáez Municipality, Durango; murdered.
- February 7 – Jorge Reyes, 56, Mexican musician (Chac Mool), heart attack.
- February 22 – Francisco Javier Rodríguez Aceves, politician PRD, former president of Petatlán (municipality), Guerrero: murdered.
- February 24 – Octavio Manuel Carrillo Castellanos, politician PRI, municipal president of Vista Hermosa, Michoacán; murdered.
- March 3 – Luis Mena Arroyo, 88, Mexican prelate, Auxiliary Bishop of Mexico.
- March 7 – |Gonzalo Paz Torres||N/A||Chief of city council||7 March 2009||Tancítaro, Michoacán||
- March 14 – Dimas Arzeta Cisneros, politician PRI, former president of Tecpan de Galeana, Guerrero; murdered.
- March 18 – Luis Rojas Mena, 91, Mexican Roman Catholic prelate, Bishop of Culiacán (1969–1993).
- March 22 – Abismo Negro, 37, Mexican lucha libre professional wrestler, drowned.
- March 23 – Raúl Macías, 74, Mexican boxer, cancer.
- March 26 – Griselda Álvarez, 95, Mexican politician and writer, Governor of Colima (1979–1985), natural causes.
- April 3 – Nicolás León Hernández, politician PRI, former municipal president of Isla del Cayacal, Michoacán; murdered.
- April 7 – Gustavo Bucio Rodríguez, politician PRD, candidate for Deputy in Michoacán; murdered.
- April 20 – Alfonso Rivera Cruz, municipal president pro tempore of Zapotitlán Tablas (municipality), Guerrero; murdered.
- April 23 – Felipe Solís Olguín, 64, Mexican archaeologist, curator of the National Anthropology Museum, cardiac arrest.
- April 30 – Amparo Arozamena, 92, Mexican actress, heart attack.
- May 5 – Manuel Capetillo, bullfighter, singer, and actor; respiratory illness (b. 1926)
- May 5 – Benjamín Flores, 24, Mexican boxer, brain injury during a match.
- June 2 – Luis Carlos Ramírez López, politician PAN, president of Ocampo Municipality; murdered.
- June 11 – Efraín Gutiérrez Arcos, politician PRI, former municipal president of Santa Ana Maya, Michoacán; murdered.
- June 23 — Manuel Saval, 53, actor (b. 1956)
- July 14
  - Héctor Manuel Meixueiro Muñoz, politician PAN, president of Namiquipa Municipality, Chihuahua; murdered.
  - Ismael Rivera, politician, treasurer of the municipality of Namiquipa, Chihuahua; murdered.
- July 19 – Guillermo Schulenburg, 93, Mexican Abbot of the Basilica of Our Lady of Guadalupe (1963–1996), natural causes.
- July 22 – Marco Antonio Nazareth, 23, Mexican boxer, cerebral hemorrhage.
- August 20
  - Carlos González Nova, 92, Mexican businessman, founder of Comercial Mexicana supermarket chain.
  - Armando Chavarría Barrera, politician PRD, Deputy from Chilpancingo, Guerrero; murdered.
- August 29 – Yolanda Varela, 79, Mexican film actress, natural causes.
- September 6 – Jose Francisco Fuentes, 43, politician; shot.
- October 9 – Estanislao García Santelis, politician, municipal president of Puerto Palomas, Chihuahua; murdered.
- October 16 – José Sánchez Chávez, politician PRI, former municipal president of Tiquicheo, Michoacán; murdered.
- October 25 – Lázaro Pérez Jiménez, 66, Mexican Roman Catholic Bishop of Celaya.
- November 6 – Manuel Arvizu, 90, Mexican Roman Catholic Bishop of Jesús María del Nayar.
- November 7 – Bernardo Garza Sada, 79, Mexican businessman, founder of ALFA.
- November 16 – Antonio de Nigris, 31, Mexican football player, heart failure.
- November 28 – Joaquín Vargas Gómez, 84, Mexican media owner, founder of MVS Comunicaciones, natural causes.
- December 4: Leticia Palma (Zoyla Gloria Ruiz Moscoso), 82, actress (En la palma de tu mano), (b. 1926)
- December 7 – Lorenzo Ochoa Salas, Mexican archeologist.
- December 16 – Arturo Beltrán Leyva, 48, Mexican drug lord, shot.
