= Cabinet of Felipe Calderón =

Members of the cabinet of the President Felipe Calderón (2006-2012).

== List ==
- Secretary of the Interior
  - Francisco Javier Ramírez Acuña
  - Juan Camilo Mouriño
  - Fernando Gómez Mont Urueta
  - Francisco Blake Mora
  - Alejandro Poiré Romero
- Secretary of Foreign Affairs
  - Patricia Espinosa
- Secretary of Defense
  - Guillermo Galván Galván
- Secretary of Navy
  - Mariano Francisco Saynez Mendoza
- Secretary of Public Security
  - Genaro García Luna
- Secretary of Finance
  - Agustín Carstens
  - Ernesto Cordero Arroyo
  - José Antonio Meade Kuribreña
- Secretary of Social Development
  - Beatriz Zavala Peniche
  - Ernesto Cordero Arroyo
  - Heriberto Félix Guerra
- Secretary of Environment
  - Juan Rafael Elvira Quesada
- Secretary of Energy
  - Georgina Kessel Martínez
  - José Antonio Meade Kuribreña
  - Jordy Herrera Gómez
- Secretary of Economy
  - Eduardo Sojo Garza-Aldape
  - Gerardo Ruiz Mateos
  - Bruno Ferrari
- Secretary of Agriculture
  - Alberto Cárdenas
  - Francisco Mayorga Castañeda
- Secretary of Communication
  - Luis Téllez
  - Juan Molinar Horcasitas
  - Dionisio Pérez-Jácome Friscione
- Secretary of Public Function
  - Germán Martínez Cázares
  - Salvador Vega Casillas
  - Rafael Morgan Ríos
- Secretary of Public Education
  - Josefina Vázquez Mota
  - Alonso Lujambio
  - José Ángel Córdova Villalobos
- Secretary of Health
  - José Ángel Córdova Villalobos
  - Salomón Chertorivski Woldenberg
- Secretary of Labor
  - Javier Lozano Alarcón
  - Rosalinda Vélez Juárez
- Secretary of Agrarian Reform
  - Abelardo Escobar Prieto
- Secretary of Tourism
  - Rodolfo Elizondo Torres
  - Gloria Guevara Manzo
- Attorney General of Mexico
  - Eduardo Medina Mora
  - Arturo Chávez Chávez
  - Marisela Morales Ibáñez
- Chief of Staff
  - Juan Camilo Mouriño
  - Gerardo Ruiz Mateos
  - Patricia Flores Elizondo
  - Gerardo Ruiz Mateos
  - Bruno Ferrari García de Alba
