= Molinar =

Molinar is a surname. Notable people with the surname include:

- Edoardo Molinar (1907–1994), Italian cyclist
- Juan Molinar Horcasitas (born 1955), Mexican politician and academic
- Iverson Molinar (born 1999), Panamanian basketball player
