= Ernesto Martens =

Mexican chemical engineer (1933–2024)

- Born: 28 January 1933; Tilapan, Veracruz, Mexico
- Died: 13 January 2024 (aged 90); Monterrey, Nuevo León, Mexico
- Occupation: Chemical engineer
- Known for: Secretary of Energy

Ernesto Martens Rebolledo (28 January 1933 – 13 January 2024) was a Mexican chemical engineer, who occupied several high-profile business positions and was Secretary of Energy during Vicente Fox's government.

== Life and career ==
Ernesto Martens was born in a small town close to the Los Tuxtlas Biosphere Reserve in Veracruz. He received his bachelor's degree in chemical engineering from Tec de Monterrey, Campus Monterrey, in 1956, where he met the founder of the school Eugenio Garza Sada. He did postgraduate studies in the Karlsruhe Institute of Technology in Germany and at Harvard Business School in the United States.

His first position was with Union Carbide Headquarters where he remained for eighteen years, becoming its CEO.

In 1977, he began with a Monterrey glass company called Vitro, becoming its first non-family CEO in 1985. During his tenure, he expanded the company's business from glass bottles into plastic containers, suitcases and washing machines with joint ventures with Ford, Corning, Samsonite and Whirlpool. He led Vitro into the U.S. glass market in the early 1980s, when Mexican demand for its products slowed and led to the only hostile takeover of a U.S. company by a Mexican company when Vitro took over Anchor Glass Container Corporation in 1989. However, he made some controversial decisions including a 1992 decision to lay off 3,000 workers, where before the company used to claim that it gave workers "a way of life".

In 1994, he became president of the board of Cintra (Corporación Internacional de Transporte Aereo), the entity which ran Mexico's two state airlines, Aeromexico and Mexicana. He restructured the finances and operations of the two airlines and was credited with saving them.

In 2000, Martens was named Secretary of Energy by President Vicente Fox, a position which he held until 2003. His nomination by Fox was something of a surprise and Martens had not considered a career in government before. His appointment as energy chief was thought to be last-minute and that Fox might keep his predecessor, Luis Téllez, in the position. When he became energy secretary, PEMEX faced problems with the inability to refine oil and gas taken from Mexico's deposits, selling mostly crude.

Martens was a member of the faculty of the Tec de Monterrey and the Thunderbird School of Global Management. He died in January 2024, at the age of 90.

== See also ==
List of Monterrey Institute of Technology and Higher Education faculty

Preceded by Luis Téllez	Secretary of Energy; 2000–2003	Succeeded by Felipe Calderón
