= Francisco Javier Salazar Sáenz =

Mexican politician

Francisco Javier Salazar Sáenz is a Mexican politician affiliated with the National Action Party PAN. He was the Secretary of Labor from 2005 to 2006.

== Education ==
Salazar Sáenz studied chemistry at the National Autonomous University of Mexico (UNAM) and at the Universidad Iberoamericana. He received a master's degree in administration from the Universidad Autónoma de San Luis Potosí and a doctorate in social sciences from the University of La Salle in Mexico City.

== Public career ==
During the 1980s Salazar Sáenz was an active labor leader in San Luis Potosí state. He was general secretary of the Unión de Asociaciones de Personal Académico de la Universidad Autonoma de San Luis Potosí (1979 to 1985), general secretary of the Asociación Nacional de Asociaciones de Personal Académico Universitario (1984 to 1988) and general secretary of the Confederación Nacional de Trabajadores Universitarios (1985 to 1989).

Salazar Sáenz served in the Chamber of Deputies during the 60th legislative session and in the Mexican Senate during the 61st and 62nd sessions.

In 2005 Mexican President Vicente Fox appointed Salazar as Secretary of Labor.

Preceded by Carlos María Abascal Carranza	Secretary of Labor and Social Welfare of Mexico; 2005–2006	Succeeded by Javier Lozano Alarcón
