= Nohelia Linares González =

Mexican politician

- Born: 7 May 1968 (age 58); Tingüindín, Michoacán, Mexico
- Occupation: Politician
- Political party: PAN

Nohelia Linares González (born 7 May 1968) is a Mexican politician from the National Action Party. She has served as Deputy of the LVI and LVIII Legislatures of the Mexican Congress representing Michoacán.
