= Group of Five =

International intergovernmental economic organization

- 五国集团 (Chinese); समूह-५ (Hindi); Grupo dos Cinco (Portuguese); Grupo de los Cinco (Spanish)

- Nations of the G5
- Formation: 2005
- Members: Group of Five: Brazil; China; India; Mexico; South Africa
- Leader: Brazil President Luiz Inácio Lula da Silva China President Xi Jinping (Note: The de jure head of government of China is the Premier, whose current holder is Li Qiang. The President of China is legally a ceremonial office, but the General Secretary of the Chinese Communist Party (de facto leader) has always held this office since 1993 except for the months of transition, and the current paramount leader is Xi Jinping.) India Prime Minister Narendra Modi Mexico President Claudia Sheinbaum South Africa President Cyril Ramaphosa

The Group of Five (G5), also known as the Outreach Five (O5), encompasses five nations which have joined for an active role in the rapidly evolving international order. Individually and as a group, the G5 nations work to promote dialogue and understanding between developing and developed countries. The G5 seek to find common solutions to global challenges. In the 21st century, the G5 were understood to be the five largest emerging economies.

The G8 plus the five largest emerging economies has come to be known as G8+5. The Group of Five was invited collectively at G8 summits from 2005 to 2009. However, the 2014 exclusion of Russia from the G8 and the rise in importance of the BRICS starting in 2009, made of the same countries minus Mexico plus Russia, brought an end to meetings in "Group of Five" format.

== History ==
The Group of Five is a context-dependent shorthand term for a group of five nations. The composition of the five and what is encompassed by the term is construed differently in different time frames. In the early 1970s, the term "Group of Five" or "G5" encompassed the five leading economies of the world, but the use of the term changed over time, after the original group became known as the G7 with the inclusion of Italy and Canada.

Between 2005 and 2014, the term was used to describe the next tier of nations whose economies had expanded so substantially as to be construed in the same category as the world's eight major industrialized countries.

=== 20th century ===
The concept of a forum for the world's major industrialized democracies emerged following the 1973 oil crisis and subsequent global recession. In 1974 the United States created the informal Library Group, an unofficial gathering of senior financial officials from France, Japan, the United Kingdom, the United States, and West Germany. These men were called the "Library Group" because they met informally in the library of the White House in Washington, D.C.

During the 1970s, the term Group of Five came to be identified the top five of the world's the leading economies as ranked by per capita GDP. Without the informal meetings of the G5 finance ministers, there would have been no subsequent meetings of G-5 leaders. In 1975, French President Valéry Giscard d'Estaing invited five other heads of government from Italy, Japan, the United Kingdom, the United States, and West Germany to a six-party economic summit in Château de Rambouillet. At the time, it was impossible to predict whether this informal gathering would be meaningful or only a public relations event.

In subsequent years, the group of world leaders expanded to reflect changed economic and political developments:

- 1975 — the Group of Six (G6)
- 1976 — the Group of Seven (G7) was created when Canada joined the G6
- 1997 — the Group of Eight (G8) was formed when Russia joined the G7

=== 21st century ===
An innovation at the Gleneagles G8 summit in 2005 was an "outreach dialogue." The United Kingdom was host for the annual summit of G8 leaders; and the UK invited the leaders of Brazil, China, India, Mexico, and South Africa to participate as the "Outreach Five" (O5). The invitation caused the five countries to negotiate amongst themselves about presenting common positions.

The success of this collaboration led to the growth of the G5 as an independent voice. The G5 expresses common interests and viewpoints in the search of solutions to major global issues.

A number of cohesive elements bind the G5 together in promoting a constructive dialogue between developed and developing countries.

The Group of Five was invited collectively at subsequent G8+5 summits until 2009. Following the 33rd G8 summit, Heiligendamm 2007, German chancellor Angela Merkel announced the establishment of the "Heiligendamm Process" through which the full institutionalization of a permanent dialogue between the G8 countries and the five greatest emerging economies should be implemented, including a common G8 and G5 platform at the OECD. A final report on the results of the dialogue was put forward in Italy in 2009. Outreach in subsequent G8 summits took other forms, including e.g. African coutnries.

In the meantime, the BRICS, made of the same countries minus Mexico plus Russia, became a major forum of collaboration among the largest developing economies, starting with the 1st BRIC summit in June 2009.

In 2014, the exclusion of Russia from the G8 following the annexation of Crimea made to the G8+5 pointless, ending the need for the Group of Five in its previous format to prepare common positions.

== Structure and activities ==
The G5 is an informal group for discussions involving an intentional community or an epistemic community. The G5 membership is marked by a range of attributes and factors, including

(a) a shared set of normative and principled beliefs, which provide a value-based rationale for the social action of community members;

(b) shared causal beliefs, which are derived from their analysis of practices leading or contributing to a central set of problems in their domain and which then serve as the basis for elucidating the multiple linkages between possible policy actions and desired outcomes;

(c) shared notions of validity — that is, intersubjective, internally defined criteria for weighing and validating knowledge in the domain of their expertise; and

(d) a common policy enterprise—that is, a set of common practices associated with a set of problems to which their group competence is directed.

By design, the G5 has avoided establishing an administrative structure like those of other international organizations, but a coordinator has been designated to help improve the G5's effectiveness.

== Current leaders ==
Member	Image	Name	Position(s)
Brazil		Luiz Inácio Lula da Silva	President of Brazil
China		Xi Jinping	General Secretary of the Chinese Communist Party; President of China
India		Narendra Modi	Prime Minister of India
Mexico		Claudia Sheinbaum	President of Mexico
South Africa		Cyril Ramaphosa	President of South Africa

== See also ==
- BRICS
- MIKTA
- Group of Seven (G7)
- Group of 15 (G15)
- G-20 major economies
