= Ernesto Cordero Arroyo =

Mexican politician

Ernesto Javier Cordero Arroyo
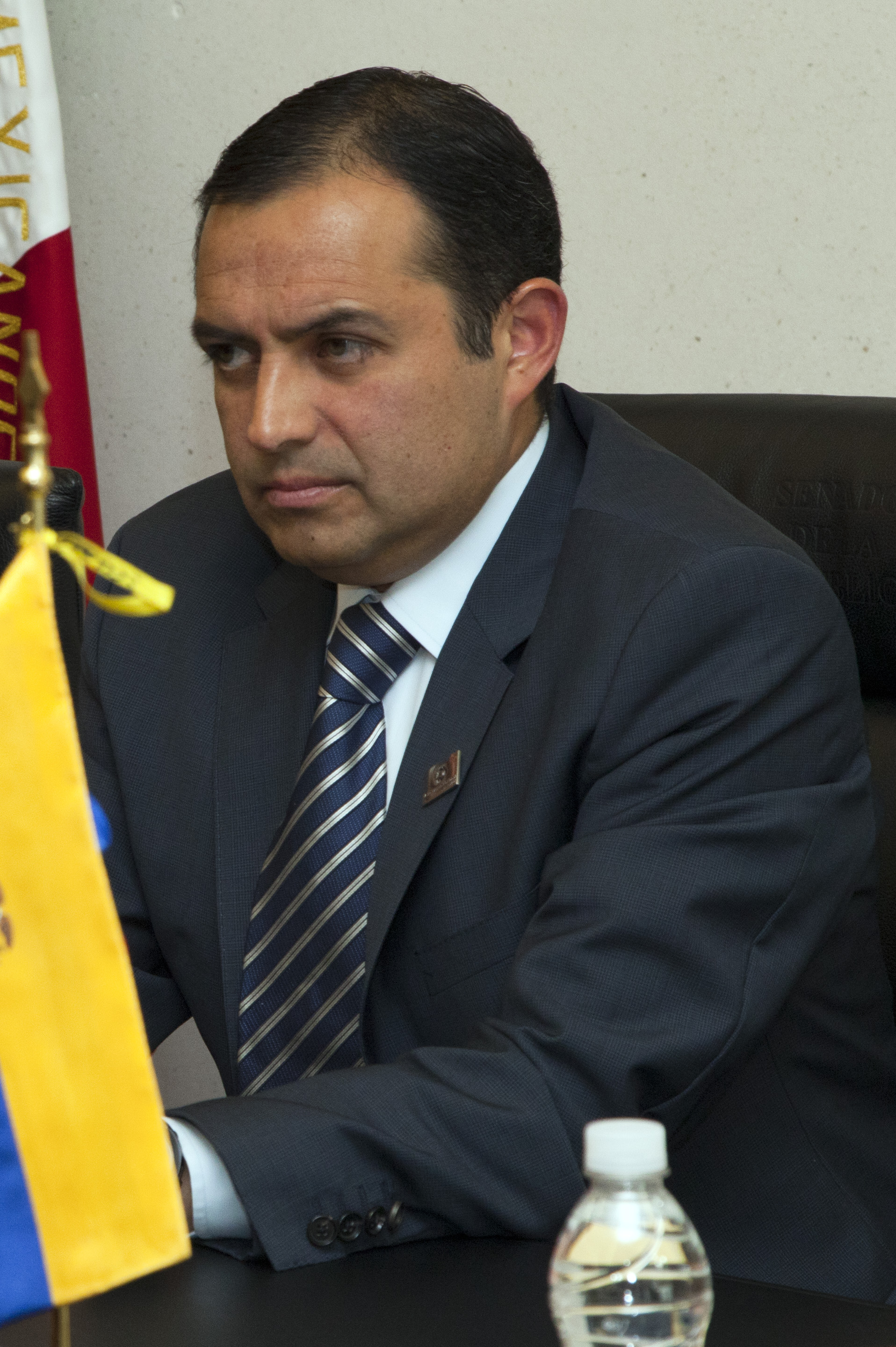

President of the Senate of Mexico
- In office 1 September 2017 – 31 August 2018
- Preceded by: Pablo Escudero Morales
- Succeeded by: Martí Batres Guadarrama
- In office 1 September 2012 – 31 August 2013
- Preceded by: José González Morfin
- Succeeded by: Raúl Cervantes Andrade

Senator of the Republic
- In office 1 September 2012 – 31 August 2018

Secretary of Finance and Public Credit
- In office 9 December 2009 – 9 September 2011
- President: Felipe Calderón
- Preceded by: Agustín Carstens
- Succeeded by: José Antonio Meade Kuribreña

Secretary of Social Development
- In office 15 January 2008 – 9 December 2009
- President: Felipe Calderón
- Preceded by: Beatriz Zavala Peniche
- Succeeded by: Heriberto Félix Guerra

Personal details
- Born: Ernesto Javier Cordero Arroyo; 9 May 1968 (age 58) Mexico City, Mexico
- Party: National Action Party
- Relations: Married
- Education: Instituto Tecnológico Autónomo de México
- Profession: Actuary
- Website: SHCP

Ernesto Javier Cordero Arroyo (born 9 May 1968) is a Mexican actuary, public servant, and politician affiliated with the National Action Party (PAN).

He served twice as a cabinet member during the Calderón administration: first as secretary of social development and then as secretary of finance and public credit until he resigned to participate in the PAN's 2012 internal elections for the presidency of Mexico, which he lost. Cordero also served as president of the Mexican Senate. This role is traditionally rotated among the three largest parties in Congress for one-year terms, from September 2012 to August 2013 and again from September 2017 to August 2018.

== Personal life ==
=== Family ===
Ernesto Cordero was born in Mexico City on 9 May 1968. He is the son of Ernesto Cordero Galindo, a renowned professor of medicine at the National Autonomous University of Mexico (UNAM), and Graciela Arroyo, a nurse who directed the National School of Nursing and Obstetrics at UNAM for two terms. On 16 May 2006, Marta Sahagún inaugurated the Esplanade of Distinguished Nurses and unveiled a bust in her honor at the headquarters of the Secretariat of Health. He has a sister, Graciela Cordero Arroyo, a professor at UNAM and a doctor in education from the University of Barcelona.

=== Education ===
He majored as an actuary at the Autonomous Technological Institute of Mexico (ITAM). He also earned a master's degree in economics from the University of Pennsylvania, where he pursued doctoral studies.

== Career ==
After completing his postgraduate studies in 2001, Cordero became general director of the PAN's Miguel Estrada Iturbide Foundation, an institution responsible for providing technical advice on legislative projects to members of the National Action Party (PAN) parliamentary group in the Chamber of Deputies.

- In 2003, he was director of comprehensive risk management at the National Works and Public Services Bank (Banobras).
- In 2004, he was appointed undersecretary of energy planning and technological development at the Secretariat of Energy.
- In 2006, he was appointed undersecretary of expenditure at the Secretariat of Finance and Public Credit.
- In 2008, he was appointed secretary of social development.
- In 2009, he was appointed secretary of finance and public credit.

Cordero has been a professor of international economics at the University of Pennsylvania, economics and statistics at the Autonomous Technological Institute of Mexico, and econometrics at the Center for Economic Research and Teaching and the Panamerican University.

In 2004, along with a small group of public officials, he resigned from his position as undersecretary of energy and technological development at the Secretariat of Energy (SENER) to support the then head of SENER, Felipe Calderón, in his presidential candidacy. During this campaign, Cordero served as public policy coordinator.

=== Secretary of Social Development ===
On 15 January 2008, President Felipe Calderón appointed him head of the Secretariat of Social Development, replacing Beatriz Zavala.

As secretary, he designed and implemented various social development policies, strengthening, modernizing, and making transparent programs with a significant impact on the living conditions of Mexicans.

During his administration, he provided timely attention to the 2008 financial crisis. He incorporated new support into social programs and ensured price stability in the country's most marginalized regions to counteract rising international food prices.

- During the crisis, nearly 150,000 families joined the food support program, and almost 230,000 new families joined the opportunities program.
- In addition to the program expansion, the opportunities program was increased by US$10 per family per month to address rising prices and by US$9 per child up to 9 years old.
- Through programs such as Liconsa and Diconsa, food prices remained stable: milk remained at US$0.33 per liter, corn at US$0.29 per kilo, and Mi Masa corn flour at US$0.41. In addition, other Sedesol-Diconsa brand products began to be sold at very low prices and of outstanding quality, such as soups, coffee, salt, chocolate, and soap.

Cordero played a key role in responding to the 2009 swine flu pandemic by coordinating strategies to give attention to the public in conjunction with the Secretariat of Health.

From 2007 to 2009, 1.3 million solid foundations were installed, benefiting nearly 4.8 million people.

In 2009, the coverage of the 70 and over program, which supports seniors, was expanded to include populations of up to 30,000 inhabitants, increasing the number of beneficiaries by almost 200,000.

=== Secretary of Finance and Public Credit ===
On 9 December 2009, President Calderón appointed him head of the Secretariat of Finance and Public Credit, replacing Agustín Carstens. He was the first secretary of finance and public credit from the PAN.

Cordero led the economic recovery, the consolidation of public finances, and the implementation of new policies with a social vision.

- As secretary of finance and public credit, Cordero has been the main driving force behind the economic recovery. The financial and treasury policies he implemented led to 5.5% growth in 2010, higher than the estimated 4.4% at the beginning of the year. This growth led to an increase in employment. Between December 2009 and March 2011, nearly one million new jobs were created.
- The simplification and modernization of the treasury allowed for a broader treasury base.
  - In 2010, non-oil tax revenues, meaning those derived from taxes not associated with oil, reached an all-time high, equivalent to 10% of GDP.
  - The taxpayer registry reached a historic high of 38.9 million people, an increase of 4.8 million taxpayers in just one year—the most significant growth in the taxpayer base since 2005.
- With Cordero at the helm of the Secretariat of Finance and Public Credit, electronic invoicing was implemented. In 2011, a new record was reached for online tax returns by legal entities (companies), an increase of almost 10% compared to the previous year. The increase in online use for filing annual tax returns in 2011 was notable: 99% of tax returns were received via this method, reflecting an increase of almost 4% compared to 2010.
- Speaking of expenditure, social development spending grew like never before in 2010. Nearly 60% of planned spending went to supporting marginalized families and investing in basic infrastructure to benefit the low-income population.
  - 98% of homes in Mexico have electricity (vs. 95% in 2000), and 91.5% have public water (vs. 88% in 2000).
  - The percentage of homes with dirt floors decreased by more than 50%, from 13.2% to 6.2% between 2000 and 2010.
  - Today, more than 25.4 million homes have drainage (90.3%), 8.6 million more than in 2000.

On 9 September 2011, he resigned from his position as secretary of finance and public credit to run for the presidential nomination of the PAN.

=== National and international committees ===
He has served as chair of the Committee of the Board of Governors of the Inter-American Development Bank (IDB), co-chair of the United Nations Transition Committee for the Design of the Green Climate Fund, co-chair of the G20 Working Group for the Review of the international monetary system, and as a counselor on the Governing Board of the Green Climate Fund (appointed by the United Nations).

In Mexico, he has served as chair of the National Council for Social Policy, coordinator of the Social Cabinet, chair of the Financial System Stability Council, coordinator of the Economic Cabinet, and as a member of the Security Cabinet.

=== Presidential pre-campaign for the 2012 election ===
In 2011, he ran for the PAN presidential nomination against Santiago Creel and Josefina Vázquez Mota, which Vázquez Mota won on 5 February 2012.

=== Candidate for senator ===
In February 2012, the National Electoral Commission of the PAN announced Cordero as the first candidate on the party's national list for the Senate. Given the PAN's status as a major national party, this decision guaranteed Cordero's election as senator in 2012.

Preceded by Agustín Carstens	Secretary of Finance and Public Credit; 2010—2011	Succeeded by José Antonio Meade
