= Felipe Solís Olguín =

Felipe R. Solís Olguín (18 December 1944 – 23 April 2009) was a Mexican archaeologist, anthropologist, and historian as well as curator and Director of the National Anthropology Museum from 2000 until his death on April 23, 2009.

Solís became a professor at the Postgraduate Mesoamerican Studies program at the Philosophy and Literature Faculty of the National Autonomous University of Mexico in 1997 and served on Academic Council of the program from 1998. He also taught at the National School of Professional Studies in Acatlan and at the National School of Anthropology and History and the National School of Restoration, Conservation and Museography. Solís was a guest lecturer at the Universidad de Extremadura in Spain and at the Universidad de Rancagua in Chile.

Initial reports of his death by some media outlets speculated that Solís Olguín had possibly been a victim of swine flu. However authorities revealed that the cause of death was complications from a pre-existing cardiac condition, unrelated to swine flu. He had escorted U.S. President Barack Obama on a tour of the museum a week before his death.

== Publications ==
During his career, he published almost 200 articles and authored or co-authored about 30 books.

=== Representative books ===
- Human Body, Human Spirit: A Portrait of Ancient Mexico, 1993
- One Hundred Masterpieces of Mexican Art: The Pre-Hispanic Period, 1998
- Olmec Art of Ancient Mexico, 1998
- National Museum of Anthropology, 1999
- Los senorios de la costa del Golfo, 2000
- Tepeyac : estudios historicos, 2000
- El Museo Nacional en el imaginario mexicano, 2001
- Aztecs, 2002
- Art Treasures of Ancient Mexico:Journey to the Land of the Gods, 2002
- Hernán Cortés y la conquista de México, 2003
- The Aztec Empire, 2004
- Mexica: National Museum of Anthropology, Mexico, 2004
- The Aztec Calendar and Other Solar Monuments, 2004
- Cholula: The Great Pyramid, 2006
- Mexica : bosquejos de la vida del pueblo, 2008
