= José Francisco Fuentes =

Mexican politician

José Francisco Fuentes Esperón (c. 1966 – September 6, 2009) was a Mexican politician. At the time of his death he was a candidate for the Tabasco state legislature with the Institutional Revolutionary Party (PRI) who lived in the state capital Villahermosa. He was also a former rector of the Universidad Tecnológica de Tabasco.

On September 6, 2009, Fuentes was shot dead by home invaders at his home in the state capital, Villahermosa. His body, along with those of his wife and two sons, were found inside their home in Villahermosa by relatives.
