= Luis Pazos =

Mexican economist, writer and politician

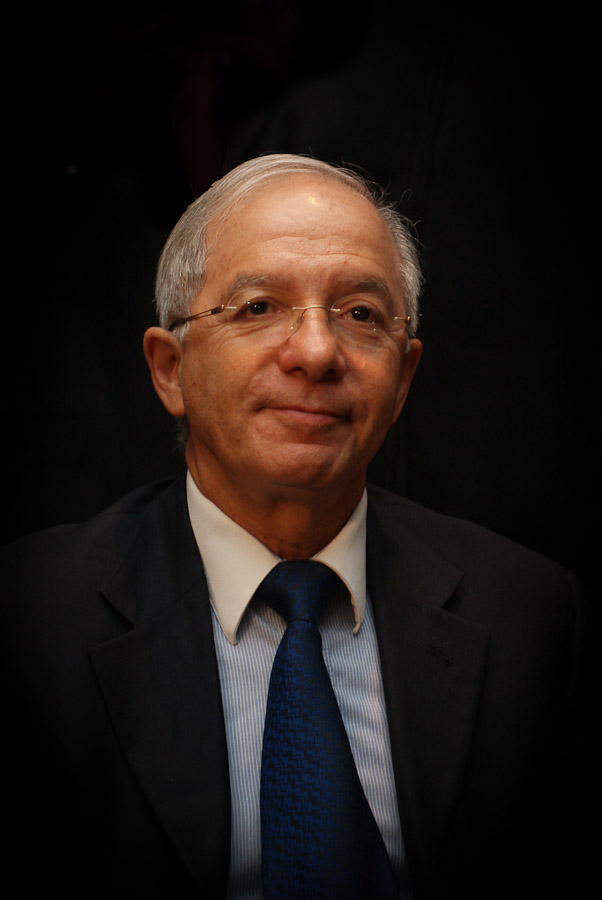
Luis Pazos

Luis Pazos (born in Veracruz on 25 August 1947) is a Mexican economist, writer and politician. He has a degree in Economics and Administration from the Instituto Tecnológico y de Estudios Superiores de Monterrey (Monterrey TEC), and a degree in Law from the Escuela Libre de Derecho in Mexico City. He studied public administration at New York University (NYU).

== Academic career ==
At the Universidad Nacional Autónoma de México (UNAM) he received a master's degree in public finance, and a doctorate in superior studies at the Law School, where lectured on the theory of economics. He has also lectured on Political Economy at the Escuela Libre de Derecho.

In 1990, Pazos was awarded a doctorate Honoris Causa by Francisco Marroquín University in Guatemala, and he has lectured there as a guest professor.

== Work ==
Apart from writing articles on economics and finance for various Latin American publications, and commentating for radio and TV, Pazos has published thirty-seven books on subjects ranging from economics and politics to history.

He acted as honorary director of the "Free Enterprise Investigation Center," and president of the Budget and Public Account Committee in the House of Representatives of the Congress of Mexico. From 2003 to 2007, Pazos was CEO of the National Bank of Public Works (Banobras) in Mexico. He is the director of the Financial Services Consumer Protection Agency (Condusef).
