= Juan Molinar Horcasitas =

Mexican politician

- Born: December 18, 1955; Chihuahua, Chihuahua
- Died: May 20, 2015 (aged 59)
- Occupation: Politician
- Known for: Former director of the Mexican Social Security Institute

Juan Francisco Molinar Horcasitas (18 December 1955 – 20 May 2015) was a Mexican politician and academic. A member of the National Action Party (Partido Acción Nacional, PAN), he served as a federal deputy and, between 2 December 2006 and 2 March 2009, director of the Mexican Social Security Institute.

President Felipe Calderón appointed Molinar Secretary of Communications and Transport on 3 March 2009. He replaced Luis Tellez in this post following the release of recordings of Téllez criticizing former president Carlos Salinas de Gortari.

== Academic career ==
Molinar completed his undergraduate studies in political science and public administration in the Acatlan National School of Professional Studies of the National Autonomous University of Mexico.

He attained a master's degree in political science from El Colegio de México and became a PhD candidate in the same field at the University of California, San Diego, United States.

In 1991, he published The time of Legitimacy: elections, authoritarianism and democracy in Mexico. He was a member of the National System of Researchers. He has taught at El Colegio de México, the Instituto Tecnologico Autonomo de Mexico, the National Autonomous University of Mexico and the Latin American Faculty of Social Sciences.

Among his publications in academic journals are Counting the Number of Parties: An Alternative Index, published in the American Political Science Review, as well as Schools of interpretation of the Mexican political system, 1988 Elections in Mexico: the crisis of authoritarianism, written with Jeffrey Weldon, and Electoral Processes in Mexico, written with Alvaro Arreola Ayala and published in the Revista Mexicana de Sociología. In all he published 30 articles in books and magazines in Mexico, the United States and the United Kingdom. He worked in news media such as Multivision To Start and the newspapers Reforma and El Universal.

== Civil Service and political career ==
Molinar began his career as a polling representative in the presidential elections of 1976, won by José López Portillo unopposed. In 1987 he published an article in Nexos magazine about fraud in elections in Chihuahua.

He was Director of Privileges for Political Parties at the Federal Electoral Institute (IFE) for the 1994 general election, and on 29 October 1996 he was elected IFE's Director General of the Electoral Council, a post he held until the year 2000. He shared duties with other directors like Alonso Lujambio, Maurice Murphy, Jacqueline Peschard, Emilio Zebadua and the Executive President, José Woldenberg.

Between December 2000 and May 2002 he served as Undersecretary of Political Development in the Interior Ministry, where the Secretary was Santiago Creel.

He was spokesman for the National Action Party (PAN) in January and July 2003. Later, during the 59th Legislature he was a Federal Deputy and served as Co-ordinator for Economic Affairs of the Parliamentary Group of the National Action Party.

He co-ordinated research and policy analysis during the presidential campaign of Felipe Calderón and, once the electoral process was completed, he joined the transition team of the president-elect.

Calderón appointed Molinar director of the Mexican Social Security Institute (IMSS), relieving Fernando Flores y Perez. In April 2007 he intervened in a dispute over abortion. Although the Federal District Legislative Assembly decriminalized abortion in Mexico City in the first twelve weeks of gestation, Molinar declined to provide that service in the clinics of the institute he headed. This has raised criticism from some lawyers and constitutionalists. Molinar was also the director of IMSS on 5 June 2009 at the time of the 2009 Hermosillo daycare center fire in which 44 toddlers and infants were killed.

== Death ==
Molinar died in Mexico City on May 20, 2015, from amyotrophic lateral sclerosis.
