= Abelardo Escobar Prieto =

Mexican politician (1938–2019)

Abelardo Escobar Prieto (19 January 1938 – 11 February 2019) was a Mexican politician and cabinet minister who served as Minister of Agrarian, Land, and Urban Development (then the Ministry of Agrarian Reform) from April 2006 to December 2012 under the administrations of presidents Vicente Fox and Felipe Calderón.

== Life ==
Escobar was born in Ciudad Juárez, Chihuahua and was a member of the National Action Party (PAN). During his extensive academic, professional and political career, he was Director General of his alma mater for three consecutive years until 1976.

He served as ESAHE representative of the Constituent Assembly of the Mexican Association of Agricultural Higher Education, which he directed in 1976.

He was Secretary of the Municipality of Juárez, and Federal Delegate of Proportional Representation of the 2nd Circumscription in the 58th Session, where he formed part of the Budget and Public Account, Finance and Public Credit, and Rural Development Commissions, of which he was secretary, and also, for a few months, of the Special Livestock Commission.

At the end of his period as delegate, he was appointed Director in Chief of the National Agrarian Register.

On April 24, 2006, President Vicente Fox appointed Abelardo Escobar Prieto Agrarian Reform Secretary.

On February 11, 2019 Escobar Prieto died in Ciudad Juárez, Chihuahua, México of kidney failure.
