= Lorenzo Ochoa Salas =

Mexican archaeologist (1943–2009)

Lorenzo Ochoa Salas (25 May 1943 – 7 December 2009) was a Mexican archaeologist. He was born in Tuxpan, Veracruz. He obtained a master's degree in anthropology, with a speciality in archaeology from the National School of Anthropology and History. He completed his doctorate in archaeology at the Faculty of Philosophy and Letters of the National Autonomous University of Mexico.

Ochoa's books include Historia prehispánica de la Huaxteca (UNAM, 1979).

Ochoa died of respiratory disease in Mexico City on 7 December 2009. The magazine Voices of Mexico devoted a special section in his memory in 2010.
