= Dionisio Pérez-Jácome Friscione =

Mexican politician

Dionisio Arturo Pérez-Jácome Friscione

Ambassador of Mexico to Canada
- Incumbent
- Assumed office 22 June 2017
- President: Enrique Peña Nieto; Andrés Manuel López Obrador

Permanent Representative of Mexico to the Organisation for Economic Co-operation and Development
- In office April 2013 – June 2017
- President: Enrique Peña Nieto
- Preceded by: Agustín García-López Loaeza
- Succeeded by: Mónica Aspe Bernal

Personal details
- Born: 1967 (age 58–59) Xalapa, Veracruz, Mexico
- Education: Instituto Tecnológico Autónomo de México; John F. Kennedy School of Government
- Occupation: Economist

Dionisio Arturo Pérez-Jácome Friscione (born 1967) is a Mexican economist who is currently Mexico's Ambassador to Canada, having entered office on June 22, 2017. He has also worked as Mexico's Permanent Representative to the Organisation for Economic Co-operation and Development (OECD) from April 2013 to June 2017, and as Secretary of Communications and Transport at the Presidential Cabinet of Felipe Calderón Hinojosa, from January 7, 2011 to November 30, 2012.

Pérez-Jácome Friscione holds a bachelor's degree in Economics and a master's degree in International Management from Mexico's Autonomous Institute of Technology, as well as a master's degree in Public Policy from The John F. Kennedy School of Government at Harvard University.

Pérez-Jácome Friscione has worked as Chief of Staff to the Mexican President and as Undersecretary of Expenditures at the Secretariat of Finance and Public Credit from 2008 to 2011.

Between 1997 and 2005, Pérez-Jácome Friscione held various positions in the Energy Sector, such as President of the Energy Regulatory Commission, Executive Director of the State Steering Committee for the Capitalization of non-Basic Petrochemical Corporations and Chief of Investment Promotion at Mexico's Energy Secretariat. Additionally, in 1992 he participated in the NAFTA negotiations as Mexico's Agriculture and Forestry Counsellor to Canada.

In the private sector, he has served as consultant in public policy at specialized firms such as: Mercer Management Consulting, McKinsey & Company (summer associate) and Consultores en Decisiones Gubernamentales (Consultants in Government Decisions).
