= Josefina Vázquez Mota =

Mexican politician (born 1961)

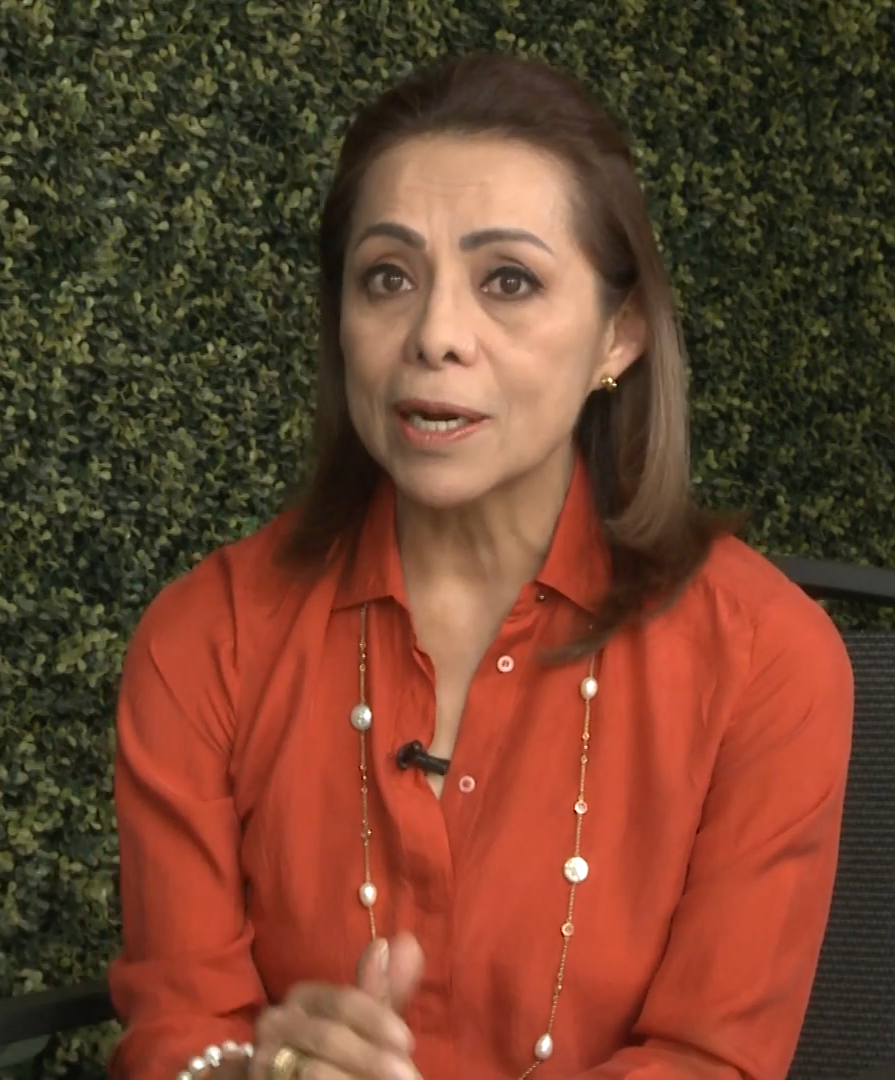

President of the Political Coordination Board of the Chamber of Deputies
- In office 5 September 2010 – 31 August 2011
- Preceded by: Francisco Rojas Gutiérrez
- Succeeded by: Armando Ríos Piter

Coordinator of the Parliamentary Group of the National Action Party
- In office 1 September 2009 – 6 September 2011
- Preceded by: Héctor Larios Córdova
- Succeeded by: Francisco Javier Ramírez Acuña

Secretary of Public Education
- In office 1 December 2006 – 4 April 2009
- President: Felipe Calderón
- Preceded by: Reyes Tamez Guerra
- Succeeded by: Alonso Lujambio

Secretary of Social Development
- In office 1 December 2000 – 6 January 2006
- President: Vicente Fox
- Preceded by: Carlos Jarque
- Succeeded by: Ana Teresa Aranda

Personal details
- Born: Josefina Eugenia Vázquez Mota; 20 January 1961 (age 65) Mexico City, Mexico
- Party: National Action Party
- Spouse: Sergio Ocampo Muñoz (m. 1994)
- Children: 3
- Education: Iberoamerican University; Panamerican University; Mexico Autonomous Institute of Technology
- Website: Official website

Josefina Eugenia Vázquez Mota ( [xo̞.se̞'fi.na'βas.ke̞s'mo̞.ta]) (born 20 January 1961, in Mexico City) is a businessperson and politician who was the presidential candidate of the National Action Party (PAN) for the 2012 elections. Vázquez Mota was trained as an economist and began her working career in family businesses and with various business organizations and conferences, also working as a journalist and writing books. She began her political career with the PAN by becoming involved in Mexico's federal Chamber of Deputies and then in the administrations of Vicente Fox and Felipe Calderón. She was the PAN's first female candidate for president.

== Background ==
Vázquez Mota was born in Mexico City on 20 January 1961. Her parents, Arnulfo Vázquez and Josefina Mota, are from the Sierra Norte de Puebla region of Mexico, and she has seven brothers and sisters. She says she is closest to her sister Lupita. When they were children they use to sell chocolate shakes on the street with a blender Josefina received for Day of the Magi.

Vázquez Mota spent the first five years of her childhood in a working-class neighborhood called Colonia 20 de Noviembre in Mexico City, began her education in public school, and started at La Patria es Primero School, in the Azcapotzalco borough. Her father originally wanted her to attend an all-girls high school and even paid paying a full year’s tuition in advance. She began high school there, but she convinced her parents to let her take the entrance exam and enter Center of Scientific and Technological StudiesCECyT 9 vocational school, affiliated with the Instituto Politécnico Nacional. She was studious in school with an affinity for mathematics.

Vázquez Mota studied at the private Universidad Iberoamericana and graduated with a degree in economics. Other university studies included courses in management at the Instituto Panamericano de Alta Dirección de Empresas, as well as a program called "Ideas e Instituciones" ("Ideas and Institutions") at the Instituto Tecnológico Autónomo de México.

Vázquez Mota met her husband, Sergio Ocampo Muñoz, a computer specialist, in high school. The couple married in 1984 after seven years of courtship. The couple have three children: María José; Celia María; and Montserrat.

Vázquez Mota maintains a very strict diet and exercise regimen, as evidenced by an unusually thin physique. She has consistently denied speculation that she suffers from either bulimia or anorexia.

== Non-political career ==
Vázquez Mota began to get involved in economic conferences due to a friend of her father’s with the Cámara de Comercio de la Ciudad de Mexico (Mexico City Chamber of Commerce) and has since been involved with various organizations and conferences in various parts of the world, especially Latin America. She worked for business organizations such as the Confederación de Cámaras Nacionales de Comercio, Servicios y Turismo (Concanaco) and the Confederación Patronal de la República Méxicana (Coparmex).

For a time in her career, she worked as a journalist on economic topics for Novedades de México, El Financiero and El Economista. In the 1980s, she and her family moved to Chihuahua to attend some of the family businesses including a clothing store for children.

She has published two books. The first was ¡Dios Mío! Házme viuda por favor ("My God! Make me a widow!") It is a self-help book that she wrote while in Chihuahua and while traveling to various conferences. It was first published in Colombia then in Mexico, as there was some hesitation over the title. Despite her editors' desire to change the title to something less controversial, Vázquez Mota insisted on keeping it. The book has sold over 400,000 copies. Her second book is called Nuestra oportunidad. Un México para todos ("Our opportunity. A Mexico for everyone"), which is a dialogue with 22 international leaders. She did a business show for TV Azteca.

== Political career ==
=== Early political career ===
Vázquez Mota began her political career with the National Action Party (PAN) with the Asociación Coordinadora Ciudadana and a member of the Secretaría de la Mujer. In 1996, she was asked to return to Mexico City to become a representative in the Chamber of Deputies because of her economics expertise. At this time, she met the PAN president, Felipe Calderón.

She was elected to the 2000–2003 federal legislature, leading the sub-coordination of economic policy. She was then appointed as the first female secretary of Desarrollo Social (Social Development) (SEDESOL). While discrete, it was known that she did not get along with then First Lady Martha Sahagún. She remained in that position until 2006, when she resigned to work for the Calderón campaign.

=== Calderón administration ===
In 2006, she was named campaign coordinator for Felipe Calderón. She was not part of Calderón's inner circle which caused some disputes during the campaign. When Calderón won, she was part of the transition team as the Coordinator of Political ties (Enlace Político). After the election, she was named Secretary of Public Education, the first woman in the job. Josefina had vied for the Secretary of the Interior (SEGOB) position but she was offered to return to SEDESOL. She chose the latter as a new challenge.

Her time there was marked by confrontations with the powerful head of the national teachers' union, Elba Esther Gordillo. Some reports state that these confrontations caused problems with Calderon's advisors with Calderon ready to remove her from the position, but this has not been confirmed. She won election to the Chamber of Deputies once again and became the co-ordinator of the PAN Parliamentary Group from 2009 to 2011.

=== 2012 presidential election ===
In 2011, she left the legislature when she won her party's nomination as candidate for president. She won the nomination over Calderón's choice of Ernesto J. Cordero, with 55% of the vote in the primary. She was the first female candidate for PAN president and the first female candidate for president from a major political party in Mexico's history.

She ran as "different" not only from the other contenders but also from her party, which had been in power for the previous twelve years. She was the least known of the candidates from the three main parties (PAN, PRI, and PRD).

As a candidate, Vázquez Mota advocated for life sentences for politicians found guilty of corruption related to organized crime. She supported more scholarships for students, and labor-law reforms, which she said would incorporate 400,000 people each year into the formal economy. She also promised to fight discrimination against women. She did not come out against the policies of her predecessors, Calderón and Fox. She stated that military personnel should be withdrawn only when the area has a "trustworthy" police force. She is also the National Political Advisor (Consejera Política Nacional) of the PAN.

She came in third place in the election with 25.4% of the total vote.

=== Post-2012 ===
Vázquez Mota ran for governor of the State of Mexico in the 2017 election but finished in fourth place in a closely fought race between Delfina Gómez of Morena and the winner, Alfredo del Mazo of a PRI-led coalition.

She was elected to the Senate from the PAN's national list in the 2018 general election.

In the 2024 general election she stood for the Chamber of Deputies in the State of Mexico's 18th district (Huixquilucan) but was narrowly defeated by Claudia Sánchez Juárez of the Ecologist Green Party of Mexico (PVEM).

Political offices
Preceded by Carlos Jarque	Secretary of Social Development; 2000–2005	Succeeded by Ana Teresa Aranda
Preceded by Reyes Tamez Guerra	Secretary of Education; 2006–2009	Succeeded by Alonso Lujambio
Party political offices
Preceded by Felipe Calderón	National Action Party nominee for President of Mexico; 2012	Succeeded by Ricardo Anaya
