= Alonso Lujambio =

Mexican politician (1962–2012)

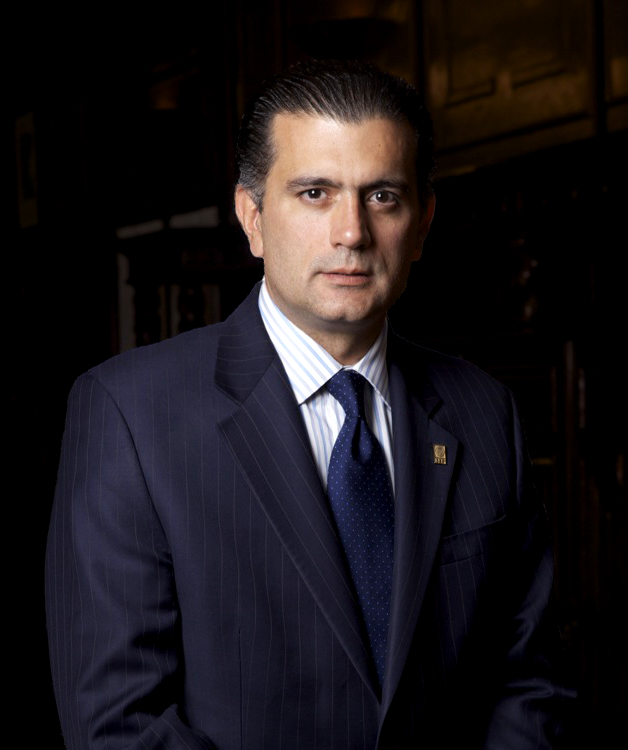
- At the Mexican Senate (2008).

Secretary of Public Education
- In office 6 April 2009 – 16 March 2012
- President: Felipe Calderón
- Preceded by: Josefina Vázquez Mota
- Succeeded by: José Ángel Córdova Villalobos

Senator of the Senate of Mexico
- In office 29 August 2012 – 25 September 2012 (died in office)

Personal details
- Born: 2 September 1962 Mexico City, Mexico
- Died: 25 September 2012 (aged 50) Mexico City, Mexico
- Party: National Action
- Education: Instituto Tecnológico Autónomo de México, Yale University
- Occupation: Academic and politician

Alonso José Ricardo Lujambio Irazábal (2 September 1962 – 25 September 2012) was a Mexican academic and politician who served as Secretary of Public Education in the cabinet of President Felipe Calderón.

Lujambio served as member of the General Council of the Federal Electoral Institute (IFE), as advisor to the United Nations, and as an academic at the Ibero-American University, the National Autonomous University of Mexico (UNAM) and the Autonomous Institute of Technology of Mexico (ITAM), where he chaired the undergraduate program in Political Science.

On 11 November 2011, Lujambio was diagnosed with multiple myeloma, following a hospitalization for acute renal failure.

On 29 August 2012, Lujambio took protest as Senator, at which he was assisted in a wheelchair.

On 25 September 2012, Senator Alonso Lujambio died after complications from cancer.
