= Javier Lozano Alarcón =

Mexican politician

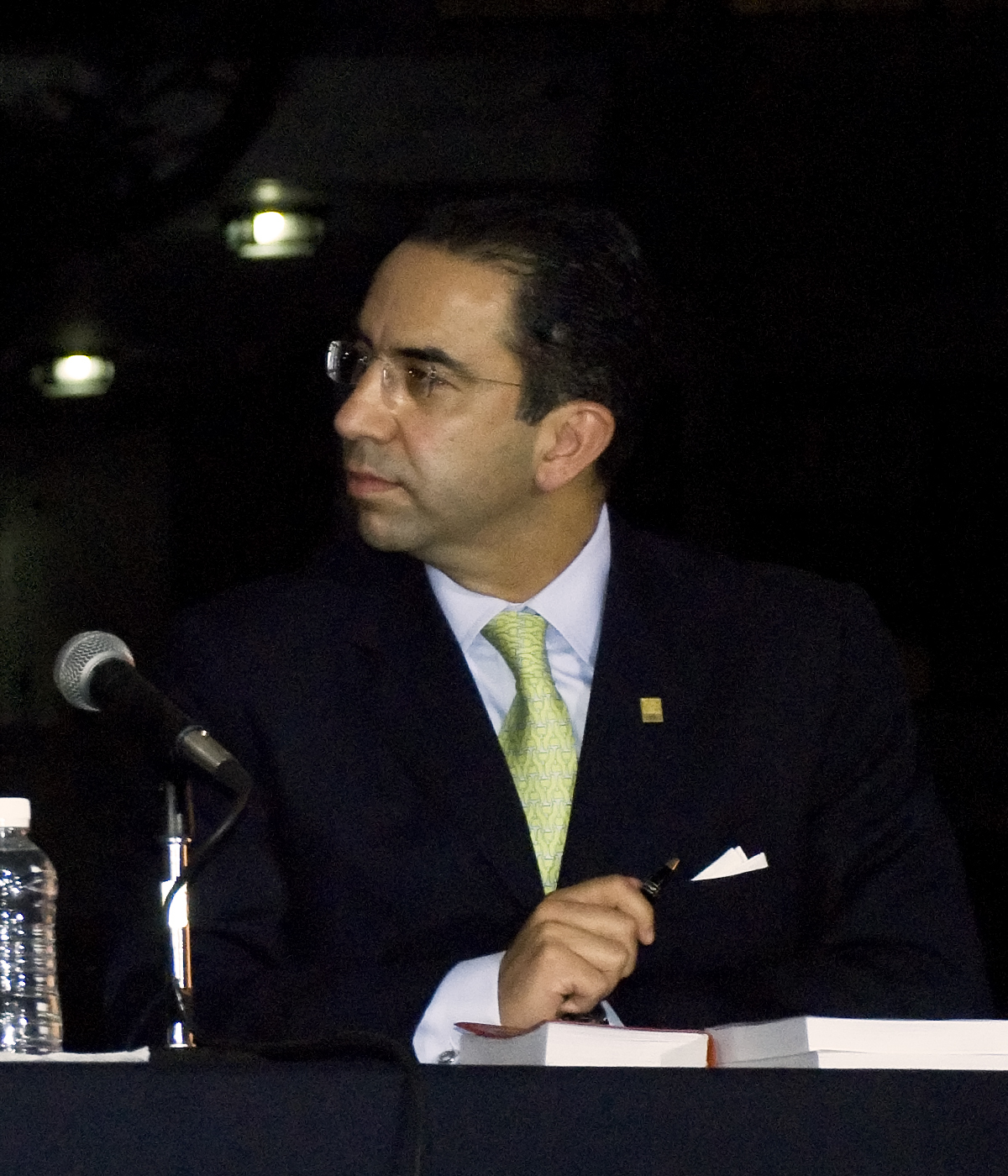

Senator for Puebla
- In office 1 September 2012 – 31 August 2018
- Preceded by: Melquiades Morales Flores
- Succeeded by: Nadia Navarro Acevedo

Secretary of Labor
- In office 1 December 2006 – 14 December 2011
- President: Felipe Calderón
- Preceded by: Francisco Javier Salazar
- Succeeded by: Rosalinda Vélez Juárez

Personal details
- Born: 21 November 1962 (age 63) Puebla, Puebla, Mexico
- Party: Institutional Revolutionary (1980–2005, 2018–present)
- Other political affiliations: National Action Party (2007–2018)
- Education: Free School of Law
- Nickname: Saco de Pus

Javier Lozano Alarcón (born November 21, 1962) is a Mexican politician who served Secretary of Labor in the cabinet of President Felipe Calderón. He was elected as a senator to the LXII Legislature of the Mexican Congress, representing Puebla. He then resigned from the PAN and worked in the campaign of presidential candidate José Antonio Meade Kuribreña.

He was telecoms consultant. Lozano has served as president of the Federal Telecommunications Commission (COFETEL).

In 2007, Chinese-Mexican businessman Zhenli Ye Gon, who was under investigation for the largest drug-related cash seizure in history, accused Lozano Alarcón of forcing him to stash at least $150 million in illicit campaign funds within his Mexico City mansion. Lozano Alarcón denied the allegations.

He is widely known for the alias "Saco de Pus" (English: Pus Sack)

Preceded by Francisco Javier Salazar Sáenz	Secretary of Labor; 2006–2011	Succeeded by Rosalinda Vélez Juárez
