= Luis Téllez =

Mexican politician

Luis Manuel Enrique Téllez Kuenzler (born October 13, 1958) is a Mexican economist. He is a former Secretary of Energy in the cabinet of Ernesto Zedillo and served as Secretary of Communications and Transportation in the cabinet of President Felipe Calderón until 2009.

Téllez graduated from the Instituto Tecnológico Autónomo de México (ITAM) with a bachelor's degree in Economics (summa cum laude) took post graduate studies in law at the National Autonomous University of Mexico (UNAM) and received a doctorate's degree in economics from the Massachusetts Institute of Technology.

He is a member of the Institutional Revolutionary Party (PRI) since 1980, where he headed the Institute for Economic, Social and Political Studies (IEPES). He joined the federal cabinet as Undersecretary of Planning at the Secretariat of Agriculture during the Carlos Salinas de Gortari administration, headed the Office of the Presidency in the Ernesto Zedillo administration and, from 1997 to 2000, served as his Secretary of Energy. During his tenure at the Secretariat of Agriculture, he wrote the book "La Modernizacion del Sector Agropecuario y Forestal", where the (1998–1994) administration's objectives with respect to the agricultural sector are laid out (ISBN 968164347X). He is also a member of the advisory board for the Mexico Institute.

When the PRI lost the Mexican presidency in 2000, Téllez joined the private sector as Executive Vice President and CEO of DESC, S.A. de C.V. Later on he joined The Carlyle Group as managing director, focusing on buyout investment opportunities in Mexico.

On November 21, 2006, President-elect Felipe Calderón announced he would serve as his Secretary of Communications and Transportation.

Luis Téllez was named "Global Leader of Tomorrow" by the World Economic Forum, and "Leader for the New Millennium" by Time magazine.

He currently serves as a senior advisor to Angeleno Group, a private equity and venture capital firm focused on sustainable energy investments.

== 2009 Scandal ==
On February 2, radio host Carmen Aristegui interviewed Diana Pando, an ex-friend of Dr. Luis Tellez who claimed and presented a revealing audio inbox cell phone recording left by mistake by Luis Tellez in his cellular phone where he clearly says to some friends with him: "Salinas se robó la mitad de la cuenta secreta" (Salinas stole half of the secret account) supposedly talking about a secret account in the Mexican federal budget which consisted in thousands of millions of pesos (about hundreds of millions of US dollars) creating a scandal and calls for Tellez' resignation .

On March 3, President Calderón announced his resignation, and thanked him for his excellent management of the situation. His successor is Juan Molina.

Political offices
Preceded by Pedro Cerisola	Secretary of Communications and Transportation; 2006–2009	Succeeded by Juan Molinar Horcasitas
