= José Ángel Córdova =

Mexican politician (born 1953)

José Ángel Córdova Villalobos (born 19 August 1953, in Mexico) is a Mexican politician who served as Secretary of Health and Secretary of Public Education during Felipe Calderón administration.

Córdova Villalobos obtained a medical degree, and an MA in Public Administration, a Specialty in State and Municipal Public Administration and an MA in Administration from the University of Guanajuato, among other qualifications. He was a delegate in the PAN parliamentary group in the 59th Session of the Mexican Congress (2003-2006), during which he directed the Health Commission.

== Career ==
- President of the Ministers' Club for EPODE International Network (EIN), the world's largest obesity-prevention network, 2013.
- Head of the Medical Education Division of the Hospital Ángeles and full-time professor at the Medicine Faculty of the University of Guanajuato (since 2002).
- President of the General Council of the Electoral Institute of the State of Guanajuato (1997–2002).
- Director of the Academy of Professors and Students of the Medicine Faculty of the University of Guanajuato (1998–2000).
- Research Project Assessor of the SSA-CONCYTEG competition, Guanajuato (2001).
- Professor in the B.Sc. in Nutrition of the Medicine Faculty of the University of Guanajuato (since 2001).
- Civic Advisor of the General Council of the Electoral Institute of the State of Guanajuato (1994).
- Vice-President of the Mexican Association of Medicine Faculties and Schools (1993–1994).
- Director of the Medicine Faculty of the University of Guanajuato (1990–1997).
- President of the Undergraduate Surgical Education Commission of the Mexican Association of General Surgery (1995–1996).
- Editor of the Revista Mexicana de Educación Médica (1993–1997).

Preceded by Julio Frenk	Secretariat of Health; 2006 - 2012	Succeeded by Salomón Chertorivski Woldenberg
Preceded by Rodolfo Tuirán Gutiérrez	Secretariat of Public Education; 2012	Succeeded by Emilio Chuayffet
