= List of politicians killed in the Mexican drug war =

This is a list of politicians murdered in the Mexican drug war. Since the start of the military-led offensive by the Mexican government in 2006, the drug trafficking organizations have slaughtered their rivals, killed police officers, and now increasingly targeted politicians – especially local leaders. Most of the places where these politicians have been killed are areas plagued by drug-related violence. Part of the strategy used by the criminal groups behind the killings of local figures is the weakening of the local governments.

Extreme violence puts politicians at the mercy of the mafias, thus allowing the cartels to take control of the fundamental government structures and expand their criminal agendas. In addition, because mayors usually appoint local police chiefs, they are seen by the cartels as key assets in their criminal activities, enabling them to control the police forces in their areas of influence. The cartels also seek to control the local governments to win government contracts and concessions; these "public works" help them ingrain themselves in the community and gain the loyalty and respect of the communities in which they operate.

Currently, the criminal organizations in Mexico earn a substantial amount of money from extortion and retail drug sales, known in Spanish as "narcomenudeo." Unlike the transnational drug trade, which can be carried out without the aid and protection of authorities, local police forces are more likely to be aware of the local extortions and drug sales. Hence, government tolerance – and, at times, government collusion – is necessary for the cartels to operate.

Politicians are usually targeted for three reasons: (1) Political figures who are honest pose a direct threat to organized crime and are consequently killed by the cartels; (2) Politicians make arrangements to protect a specific cartel and are killed by a rival cartel; and (3) a cartel simply kills politicians to heat up the turf of a rival cartel that operates in the area.

Another issue behind the assassination of politicians is that Mexico is more democratic than it used to be a couple of decades ago when the Institutional Revolutionary Party (PRI) ruled Mexico uninterruptedly for more than seven decades. Today, the criminal groups have to deal with three major political parties, posing challenges to the long relationships the cartels had during the past regime. Drug-related assassinations are not solely limited to local and low-profile politicians. As demonstrated by the killing of Rodolfo Torre Cantú in June 2010, a candidate for the PRI who was running for governor of Tamaulipas, drug lords are interfering with Mexico's election process.

Eighty-eight politicians or candidates were killed between September 2020 and the June 2021 Mexican legislative election.

According to a 2026 study, "high-capacity cartels and inter-cartel conflicts are the strongest predictors of violence against politicians."

== List ==
Notes

- A municipal president is comparable to a mayor of a town or city.
- A deputy is a member of the Chamber of Deputies of Mexico.
- Politicians who are reported as "disappeared" are included in the list with a note in References box.

=== Presidency of Felipe Calderón ===
Name	Political Party	Position	Date	Location	Sources
Juan Antonio Guajardo Anzaldúa	PAN; PRD; PT	Former municipal president, Senator, and Deputy	29 November 2007	Río Bravo, Tamaulipas	(Note: Guajardo Anzaldúa was municipal president for PAN (1993-1995) and later for PT (2002-2003); Federal deputy for PRD (1996-2000) and PT (2004-2006); and Senator for Tamaulipas for the PRD (1994).)
Leopoldo Juárez Urbina	Convergence	Former municipal president	8 May 2008	Cherán, Michoacán	
Marcelo Ibarra Villa	PRI	Municipal president	1 June 2008	Villa Madero, Michoacán	
Manuel de Jesús Angulo Torres	PRI	Municipal president	4 June 2008	Topia, Durango	(Note: Angulo Torres was kidnapped with his brother at a restaurant on 4 June 2008. His body has not been found and he is not reported as dead.)
Juan Manuel Orozco Serrano	PRI	Former municipal president	24 July 2008	Cuautitlán, Jalisco	
Héctor Lorenzo Ríos	PRD	Municipal president	24 September 2008	Ayutla, Guerrero	
Salvador Vergara Cruz	PRI	Municipal president	8 October 2008	Ixtapan de la Sal, State of Mexico	
Claudio Reyes Núñez	PRI	Municipal president	6 February 2009	Otáez, Durango	
Francisco Javier Rodríguez Aceves	PRD	Former municipal president	22 February 2009	Petatlán, Guerrero	
Octavio Manuel Carrillo Castellanos	PRI	Municipal president	24 February 2009	Vista Hermosa, Michoacán	
Gonzalo Paz Torres	N/A	Chief of city council	7 March 2009	Tancítaro, Michoacán	
Dimas Arzeta Cisneros	PRI	Former municipal president	14 March 2009	Tecpán de Galeana, Guerrero	
Nicolás León Hernández	PRI	Former municipal president	3 April 2009	Isla del Cayacal, Michoacán	
Gustavo Bucio Rodríguez	PRD	Candidate for Deputy (legislator)	7 April 2009	Michoacán	
Alfonso Rivera Cruz	N/A	Municipal president pro tempore	20 April 2009	Zapotitlán Tablas, Guerrero	
Luis Carlos Ramírez López	PAN	Municipal president	2 June 2009	Ocampo, Durango	
Efraín Gutiérrez Arcos	PRI	Former municipal president	11 June 2009	Santa Ana Maya, Michoacán	
Héctor Manuel Meixueiro Muñoz	PAN	Municipal president	14 July 2009	Namiquipa, Chihuahua	
Ismael Rivera	N/A	Treasurer of the municipality	14 July 2009	Namiquipa, Chihuahua	
Armando Chavarría Barrera	PRD	Congressman	20 August 2009	Chilpancingo, Guerrero	
José Francisco Fuentes	PRI	Candidate for state legislature	6 September 2009	Villahermosa, Tabasco	
Estanislao García Santelis	N/A	Municipal president	9 October 2009	Puerto Palomas, Chihuahua	
José Sánchez Chávez	PRI	Former municipal president	16 October 2009	Tiquicheo, Michoacán	
Aurelio Fausto Cháidez Chavarín	N/A	Former municipal president	9 January 2010	Culiacán, Sinaloa	
Ramón Mendívil Sotelo	PRI	Municipal president	18 February 2010	Guadalupe y Calvo Municipality, Chihuahua	
Manuel Estrada Escalante	PRI	Municipal president	23 February 2010	Mezquital Municipality, Durango	
José Santiago Agustín	PRI	Municipal president	28 April 2010	Zapotitlán Tablas, Guerrero	
Abel Uribe Landa	PRI	Former municipal president	3 May 2010	Tetipac, Guerrero	
José Mario Guajardo Varela	PAN	Candidate for municipal presidency	12 May 2010	Valle Hermoso, Tamaulipas	
Jesús Manuel Lara Rodríguez	PRI	Municipal president	19 June 2010	Guadalupe Municipality, Chihuahua, Chihuahua	
Óscar Venancio Martínez Rivera	PRI	Municipal president	19 June 2010	San José del Progreso, Oaxaca	
Rodolfo Torre Cantú	PRI	Candidate for governor	28 June 2010	Ciudad Victoria, Tamaulipas	
Enrique Blackmore Smer	PRI	Deputy (legislator)	28 June 2010	Ciudad Victoria, Tamaulipas	
Nicolás García Ambrosio	PRD	Municipal president	30 June 2010	Santo Domingo, Oaxaca	
Romero Núñez Montiel	Compromise for Puebla (coalition party)	Candidate for municipal presidency	3 July 2010	Jolalpan, Puebla	(Note: Compromise for Puebla (Compromiso por Puebla) was a coalition party made up of the PAN, PRI, PRD, PANAL, and Convergence.)
Alberto Herrera Casillas	N/A	Former municipal president	10 July 2010	Tecalitlán, Jalisco	
Edelmiro Cavazos Leal	PAN	Municipal president	18 August 2010	Santiago, Nuevo León	
Marco Antonio Leal García	PRI	Municipal president	29 August 2010	Hidalgo, Tamaulipas	
Alexander López García	PRI	Municipal president	8 September 2010	El Naranjo, San Luis Potosí	
Prisciliano Rodríguez Salinas	PRI	Municipal president	23 September 2010	Doctor González, Nuevo León	
Gustavo Sánchez Cervantes	N/A	Interim municipal president	27 September 2010	Uruapan, Michoacán	
Antonio Jiménez Baños	PRI	Municipal president-elect	8 October 2010	Mártires de Tacubaya, Oaxaca	(Note: Jiménez Baños is also referred to as Artemio Tomás.)
José Felipe García	N/A	Municipal president	16 October 2010	Cruillas, Tamaulipas	(Note: José Felipe García was kidnapped by gunmen on 16 October 2010 and is currently disappeared. Officially, he had not been reported dead.)
Rito Grado Serrano	N/A	Municipal president	17 October 2010	Praxedis G. Guerrero, Chihuahua	
Jaime Lozoya Ávila	PRD	Municipal president	6 November 2010	San Bernardo, Durango	
Gregorio Barradas Miravete	PAN	Municipal president	9 November 2010	Juan Rodríguez Clara, Veracruz	
Omar Manzur	PAN	Municipal president pro tempore	9 November 2010	Juan Rodríguez Clara, Veracruz	
Jesús Silverio Cavazos Ceballos	PRI	Former governor	21 November 2010	Colima, Colima	
Saúl Vara Rivera	PRI	Municipal president	5 January 2011	Zaragoza, Coahuila	
Abraham Ortiz Rosales	PVEM	Municipal president	11 January 2011	Temoac, Morelos	
Luis Jiménez Mata	N/A	Municipal president	13 January 2011	Santiago Amoltepec, Oaxaca	
Juan Carlos Guardado Méndez	PT	Former municipal president	4 February 2011	Fresnillo, Zacatecas	(Note: Guardado Méndez was abducted on 4 February 2011 and is currently disappeared. He is not reported as dead.)
Adán Ocampo Ortiz	PAN	Municipality director	9 February 2011	Chinameca, Veracruz	(Note: Ocampo Ortiz was kidnapped on 9 February 2011 and has not been found. He is not reported as dead.)
Saturnino Valdez Llanos	PRI	Municipal president	12 February 2011	Tampico Alto, Veracruz	(Note: Valdez Llanos was intercepted by gunmen and has not been found. He is not reported as dead.)
José Luis Prieto Torres	N/A	Former municipal president	22 February 2011	Allende, Chihuahua	
Enrique Chávez Gómez	PRD	Former candidate for municipal presidency	28 February 2011	Saucillo, Chihuahua	
Mario Chuc Aguilar	N/A	Former municipal president	10 March 2011	Felipe Carrillo Puerto, Quintana Roo	
Enterbio Reyes Bello	N/A	Former municipal president	7 April 2011	Copanatoyac, Guerrero	
Silvia Moreno Leal	N/A	Former municipal president	14 May 2011	Balleza, Chihuahua	
Fernando Duarte Flores	N/A	Former municipal president	18 May 2011	Nuevo Laredo, Tamaulipas	
Alfonso López Vázquez	N/A	Former municipal president	27 May 2011	Jalapa, Tabasco	(Note: López Vázquez was forced out of his vehicle and kidnapped while he headed to his ranch. He has not been found.)
Eduardo García Delgado	PRI	Former municipal president	7 June 2011	Lerdo de Tejada, Veracruz	(Note: Seven gunmen kidnapped García Delgado outside a hardware store. His wife tried to impede his abduction and was beaten.)
Gonzalo Amador Ortega	PAN	Former candidate for municipal presidency	24 June 2011	Huauchinango, Puebla	
Ernesto Cornejo Valenzuela	PAN	Former candidate for deputy; State delegate for the PAN	21 July 2011	Villa Juárez, Sonora	
Fortino Cortés Sandoval	N/A	Municipal president	28 July 2011	Florencia de Benito Juárez, Zacatecas	
José Eduviges Nava Altamirano	PT	Municipal president	20 August 2011	Zacualpan, State of Mexico / Teloloapan, Guerrero	
Luz María García Villagrán	N/A	Municipal president	24 August 2011	Gran Morelos, Chihuahua	
Gustavo Pacheco Villaseñor	PRI	Former municipal president	15 September 2011	Tuxtepec, Oaxaca	
Moisés Villanueva de la Luz	PRI	Deputy (legislator)	17 September 2011	Tlapa de Comonfort, Guerrero	
Ricardo Guzmán Romero	PAN	Municipal president	2 November 2011	La Piedad, Michoacán	
Roberto Miguel Galván	N/A	Former municipal president	19 November 2011	Tepetzintla, Veracruz	(Note: Cartel members broke into Galván's house and kidnapped him. He remains disappeared.)
Fortunato Ruiz Blázquez	N/A	Former municipal president	12 December 2011	Ixhuacán, Veracruz	
José Martínez Mendoza	N/A	Former municipal president	21 December 2011	Cosalá, Sinaloa	
Porfirio Flores Ayala	PRI	Former municipal president	31 December 2011	Cuernavaca, Morelos	
Arturo García Solano	PRD	Former candidate for deputy (legislator)	10 March 2012	Ciudad Valles, San Luis Potosí	
Alfonso Peña Peña	PAN	Former municipal president	16 March 2012	Tepehuanes, Durango	(Note: Peña was abducted on 25 July 2010. Nonetheless, his body was found inside a clandestine mass grave on 16 March 2012.)
Francisco García Girard	PRI	Former municipal president	14 April 2012	Aquiles Serdán, Chihuahua	
Rafael Landa Fernández	N/A	Municipal president pro tempore	18 April 2012	Atzalan, Veracruz	
Horacio Barquín Cevallos	PRI	Municipal president pro tempore	28 April 2012	Taxco, Guerrero	
Rafael Ariza Bibiano	PRD	Former municipal president	2 June 2012	Coyuca de Benítez, Guerrero	(Note: Ariza Bibiano was forced out of his domicile by armed men. They never called back for ransom.)
Margarito Genchi Casiano	PRD	Candidate for Deputy (legislator)	11 June 2012	Florencio Villarreal, Guerrero	
Marisol Mora Cuevas	PAN	Municipal president	28 June 2012	Loma Bonita, Oaxaca	
Pedro Filemón Luis Hernández	N/A	Municipal president pro tempore	2 August 2012	San Miguel Tilquiapam, Oaxaca	
Nadin Torralba Mejía	PRI	Municipal president	5 August 2012	Tecpan de Galeana, Guerrero	(Note: Torralba Mejía was kidnapped by armed men after they intercepted his vehicle. He is currently disappeared.)
Rodolfo Leal Alanís	Social Democratic Party	Former candidate for Deputy	7 August 2012	Escobedo, Nuevo León	
Wilfrido Campos González	PRI	Former deputy (legislator)	8 August 2012	Matamoros, Tamaulipas	
Édgar Morales Pérez	PRI	Municipal president-elect	12 August 2012	Matehuala, San Luis Potosí	
Ignacio Pérez Rodríguez	PRD	Former candidate for municipal presidency	18 August 2012	Tamuín, San Luis Potosí	(Note: Pérez Rodríguez disappeared in Ciudad Mante, Tamaulipas with four family members. Nothing is known of their whereabouts.)
Nahum Tress Manica	PRI	Former municipal president	28 August 2012	Isla, Veracruz	
Hernán Belden Elizondo	PAN	Former deputy (legislator)	7 September 2012	Santa Catarina, Nuevo León	
Miguel Jaimes Palacios	N/A	Former municipal president	8 September 2012	Tierra Caliente, Guerrero	
Eduardo Castro Luque	PRI	Deputy-elect	14 September 2012	Ciudad Obregón, Sonora	
Jaime Serrano Cedillo	PRI	Deputy (legislator)	16 September 2012	Ciudad Nezahualcóyotl, State of Mexico	
Lorenzo Salinas Mendoza	N/A	Former municipal president	26 September 2012	Santa María Temaxcaltepec, Oaxaca	
Raúl Antonio Rodríguez Barrera	PRI	Former municipal president	31 October 2012	Ciudad Miguel Alemán, Tamaulipas	
María Santos Gorrostieta Salazar	PRD	Former municipal president	16 November 2012	Cuitzeo, Michoacán	

=== Presidency of Enrique Peña Nieto ===
Name	Political Party	Position	Date	Location	Sources
Rafael Piña de Luna	PRD	Former candidate for municipal presidency	15 December 2012	Ciudad Valles, San Luis Potosí	
Amalia Terán Rubio	PAN	Deputy pro tempore	16 December 2012	Huehuetlán, San Luis Potosí	
Pablo Antonio Pintor	PRI	Former municipal president	16 December 2012	Ciudad del Maíz, San Luis Potosí	
Miguel Ángel Farfán Ortega	PRI	Former candidate for municipal presidency	18 December 2012	Santa Clara del Cobre, Michoacán	
Ignacio Domínguez Carranza	PAN	Former candidate for municipal presidency	18 January 2013	Tlaquiltenango, Morelos	
Wilfrido Flores Villa	N/A	Interim municipal president	4 February 2013	Nahuatzen, Michoacán	
Jesús Manuel Landero	PRI	Candidate for municipal president	18 February 2013	Lerdo, Durango	
Enrique Marín Lara	PAN	Former municipal president	22 February 2013	Soledad de Doblado, Veracruz	
Francisco David Carrasco Carnero	PAN	Former municipal president	23 February 2013	Julimes, Chihuahua	
Feliciano Martínez Bautista	N/A	Municipal president	25 March 2013	San Juan Mixtepec, Oaxaca	
José René Garrido Rocha	PRI	Municipal president	20 April 2013	San Salvador el Verde, Oaxaca	
Celestino Félix Vázquez Luis	N/A	Municipal president	4 June 2013	San Miguel Tilquiapam, Oaxaca	
Jaime Orozco Maxdigal	PRI	Candidate for municipal presidency	11 June 2013	Guadalupe y Calvo, Chihuahua	
Guillermo Maceda Cervantes	PRD	Pre-candidate for municipal president	15 June 2013	Tlacoachistlahuaca, Guerrero	
Isaac López Rojas	Party of the Cardenist Front of National Reconstruction (PFCRN)	Candidate of municipal president pro tempore	15 June 2013	Martínez de la Torre, Veracruz	
José Ramírez Román	PRI	Former municipal president	21 June 2013	Saín Alto, Zacatecas	
Francisco Navarro Montenegro	PFCRN	Former candidate for governor	29 June 2013	Saltillo, Coahuila	
Ricardo Reyes Zamudio	Citizens' Movement	Candidate for municipal president	1 July 2013	Durango, Durango	
Víctor Tapia Ocampo	N/A	Former municipal president	14 August 2013	Tetecala, Morelos	
Gabriel Gómez Michel	PRI	Deputy of the LXII Legislature of the Mexican Congress	22 or 23 September 2014	Zacatecas	
Aidé Nava González	PRD	Pre-candidate for municipal president	11 March 2015	Ahuacutzingo, Guerrero	
Ulises Fabian Quiroz	PRI	Candidate for municipal president	1 May 2015	Chilapa de Álvarez, Guerrero	
Enrique Hernandez	MORENA	Candidate for municipal president	14 May 2015	Yurécuaro, Michoacan	
Gisela Mota Ocampo	PRD	Deputy of LXII Legislature and the Mayor of Temixco	2 January 2016	Temixco, Morelos	
Juan Antonio Mayen Saucedo	PAN	Municipal president	22 April 2016	Jilotzingo, State of Mexico	
Domingo Lopez Gonzalez		Municipal president	25 June 2016	San Juan Chamula, Chiapas	
Narciso Lunes Hernandez		Vice municipal president	25 June 2016	San Juan Chamula, Chiapas	(Note: Four people were killed and 12 injured.)
Ambrosio Soto Duarte		Municipal president	25 June 2016	Pungabarato, Guerrero	(Note: The mayor received death threats in January. He and a gangster were killed; two police officers were injured.)
Jose Santa Maria Zavala		Municipal president	1 August 2016	Huehuetlan El Grande, Puebla	
Jesús Dámaso Baños Tapia		Former municipal president	23 December 2016	San Juan Cacahuatepec, Oaxaca	
Julio Filogonio López Quiroz	MORENA	Former municipal president	15 January 2017	San Andrés Huaxpaltepec, Oaxaca	
Antolin Vital Martinez		Municipal president	24 January 2017	Tepexco, Puebla	
Amado Islas Espejel	PRD	Former municipal president	25 February 2017	Tepetlaoxtoc de Hidalgo, State of Mexico	
Francisco Tecuchillo Neri	PRD	Former mayor of Zitlala, Guerrero	13 October 2017	Chilapa, Guerrero	
Ranferi Hernandez Acevedo	PRD	Social activist and politician	14 October 2017	Ahuacuotzingo, Guerrero	
Victor Manuel Espinoza Tolentino	N/A	Mayor	26 November 2017	Ixhuatlán de Madero, Veracruz	
Francisco Rojas San Román	PRI	Federal deputy (2009-2012)	5 February 2018	Cuautitlán Izcalli, State of Mexico	
Aarón Varela Martínez	MORENA	Candidate for mayor	1 March 2018	Santa Clara Ocoyucan, Cholula, Puebla	
Jose Remedios Aguirre	MORENA	Candidate for Mayor, former municipal chief of security	11 May 2018	Apaseo el Alto, Guanajuato	
Fernando Purón Johnston	PRI	Candidate for deputy, former mayor of Piedras Negras	8 June 2018	Piedras Negras, Coahuila	

=== Presidency of Andrés Manuel López Obrador ===
Name	Political Party	Position	Date	Location	Sources
Alejandro Aparicio Santiago; Perfecto Hernández Gutiérrez	MORENA	Municipal President of Tlaxiaco; Alderman of Tlaxiaco	1 January 2019	Tlaxiaco, Oaxaca (near City Hall)	
María Ascención Torres Cruz	MORENA	Local official	1 January 2019	Morelos	
Cutberto Porcayo Sánchez	MORENA	local party leader	3 January 2019	Villa de Tututepec de Melchor Ocampo, Oaxaca	
José Almanza Alcaine	Citizens' Movement	former alderman and candidate of for municipal president	17 January 2019	Tlaquiltenango, Morelos	
Rodrigo Segura Guerrero	PES	local official	21 March 2019	Atizapán de Zaragoza, State of Mexico	
Jorge Dominguez Alvarez		son of the mayor	26 March 2019	Paraíso, Tabasco	
Sergio Armando Hernández Vega		Former Secretary of President Enrique Peña Nieto's bodyguard	17 April 2019	State of Mexico	
David Eduardo Otlica Avilés	PRD	Municipal president	23 April 2019	Nahuatzen, Michoacán	
Maricela Vallejo Orea; Efrén Zopiyactle Tlaxcaltécatl	MORENA	Mayor; Municipal treasurer	24 April 2019	Altamirano, Veracruz	(Note: Vallejo's husband and driver were also killed.)
Humberto Adame Castillo	PAN	Brother of former governor Marco Antonio Adame	Body found 16 May 2019	Alpuyeca, Xochitepec, Morelos	
Eusebio Martinez	PES	Alderman	12 July 2019	Los Reyes Acaquilpan, La Paz, State of Mexico	
Victor Hugo Padilla Nava		Police chief	12 July 2019	Pilcaya, Guerrero	
Fernando Tinoco Cervantes		representative of the Secretariat of the Interior (SEGOB)	19 July 2019	Huejotzingo, Puebla	
Bertha Silva Díaz	MORENA	Former candidate for local deputy	9 August 2019	Chilapa de Álvarez, Guerrero	
Carmela Parral Santos; Hugo Castellanos Ortega	PRD	Mayor local official	16 August 2019	San José Estancia Grande, Oaxaca	
Orencio Bello Sánchez	MORENA; PES	Former candidate for mayor	21 August 2019	Chilapa, Guerrero	(Note: Orencio Bello's stepson was also murdered.)
Francisco García Ramírez	MORENA	Alderman	24 September 2019	Apaseo el Alto, Guanajuato	
José Luis Saucillo Méndez	PAN	Alderman	25 September 2019	Comonfort, Guanajuato	
Santiago Maravatío	PAN	Alderman	28 October 2019	Santiago Maravatío, Guanajuato	(Note: Missing since 19 September 2019; body found 28 October)
Francisco Tenorio Contreras	PRD	Mayor	29 October 2019	Valle de Chalco, State of Mexico	
Óscar Ramírez Pedrote	PT	Party leader, brother of alderman	2 November 2019	Acapulco, Guerrero	
Juan Gabriel Rodríguez Salinas	PRI	Former mayor	3 November 2019	Santiago Llano Grande, Oaxaca	
Juan Carlos Molina Palacios	PRI	Deputy	9 November 2019	Medellín de Bravo, Veracruz	
Hugo Estefanía Monroy	PRD	Former mayor	30 November 2019	Cortazar, Guanajuato	(Note: His wife was also seriously injured in the attack.)
Lorenzo Barajas Heredia	PRD	Former mayor	13 December 2019	Buenavista, Michoacán	
Fidel Fernández Figueroa	PRI (Former); PVEM (Former); MORENA	Councilman	22 December 2019	Papaloapan Region, Oaxaca	
Arturo García Velázquez; Javier Terrero	MORENA	Mayor; Trustee	23 December 2019	San Felipe de Jalapa de Díaz, Oaxaca	
Luciano Moreno López	PRI	Former mayor	31 December 2019	Cochoapa el Grande, Guerrero	
Erik Juárez Blanquet	PRD	Former federal deputy	March 10, 2020	Michoacan	
Obed Durón Gomez		Municipal President	8 April 2020	Mahahual, Quintana Roo	
Luis Alfonzo Robles Contreras		Former Municipal President	15 May 2020	Magdalena de Kino, Sinaloa	
Alfonso Isaac Gamboa Lozano	PRI	Former Undersecretary of Finance and Public Credit (SHCP)	21 May 2020	Temixco, Morelos	(Note: Four other members of his family were also killed.)
Oswaldo García Vallejo		Police chief	31 May 2020	Jalostotitlán, Jalisco	
Francis Anel Bueno Sánchez	MORENA	Local deputy	3 June 2020	Ixtlahuacán, Colima	(Note: Kidnapped 29 April 2020, body found 3 June.)
Ángel Fuentes Olivares ("El Pato")		Former state attorney general	3 June 2020	Veracruz	
Joel Negrete Barrera	MORENA	Former candidate for Municipal President	25 June 2020	Abasolo, Guanajuato	
Francisco Javier Fierro Torres		Local office-holder	12 July 2020	Choix, Sinaloa	
Herón Sarabia Mendoza	MORENA	Local party leader	20 August 2020	Tlapehuala, Guerrero	
Florisel Ríos Delfín	PRD	Municipal president	10 November 2020	Jamapa, Veracruz	
Aristóteles Sandoval	PRI	Former Governor of Jalisco	18 December 2020	Puerto Vallarta, Jalisco	
Juan Antonio Acosta Cano	PAN	Deputy in Congress of Guanajuato	12 January 2021	Guanajuato, Guanajuato	
Leobardo Ramos Lázaro		Municipal president of Chahuites	4 February 2021	Chahuites, Oaxaca	
Gladys Merlín Castro	PRI	Former mayor	15 February 2021	Cosoleacaque, Veracruz	
Ignacio Sánchez Cordero	MORENA and PVEM	candidate for mayor of Puerto Morelos	25 February 2021	Puerto Morelos, Quintana Roo	
Melquiades Vázquez Lucas (″El Pantera″)	PRI	candidate for mayor of La Perla	4 March 2021	La Perla, Veracruz	
Yuriel Armando González Lara	PRI	candidate for mayor of Nuevo Casas Grandes	4 March 2021	Nuevo Casas Grandes, Chihuahua	
Cecilia Yépiz Reyna		Former Secretary of Urban Development and Ecology of Nogales	6 March 2021 (body found on this date)	Nogales, Sonora	
Ivonne Gallegos	PAN	Candidate for mayor of Ocotlán de Morelos	20 March 2021	Ocotlán de Morelos	
Mayco Fabián Tapia Quiñones		Candidate for deputy	24 March 2021	Monterrey	
Alejandro Galicia Juárez	PRD	Candidate for alderman	31 March 2021	Apaseo el Grande, Guanajuato	
Altamirano Gonzalo Elías Zopiyactle		Former mayor	2 April 2021 body found on this date	Mixtla, Puebla	
Francisco Gerardo Rocha Chávez	PVEM	Candidate for local deputy	24 April 2021	Victoria, Tamaulipas	
Abel Murrieta Gutiérrez	Citizens' Movement	Former member of Chamber of Deputies and Attorney General of Sonora	13 May 2021	Ciudad Obregón, Sonora	
Alma Rosa Barragán	Citizens' Movement	Candidate for municipal president of Moroleon	25 May 2021	Moroleón, Guanajuato	
Gisela Gaytán	MORENA	Candidate for municipal president of Celaya	1 April 2024	Celaya, Guanajuato	
Héctor Melesio Cuén Ojeda	PRI	Former mayor of Culiacán, former Rector of the Autonomous University of Sinaloa, and deputy-elect	25 July 2024	Culiacán, Sinaloa	

=== Presidency of Claudia Sheinbaum ===
Name	Political Party	Position	Date	Location	Sources
Francisco Tapia Gutiérrez	n/d	General Secretary of the minicipal government of Chilpancingo, Guerrero	3 October 2024	Chilpancingo	
Alejandro Arcos	PRI	Mayor of Chilpancingo	6 October 2024	Chilpancingo, Guerrereo	
Román Ruiz Bohórquez	No party (planilla blanca)	Municipal president of Candelaria Loxicha, Oaxaca	12 October 2024	Candelaria Loxicha, Oaxaca	
Benito Aguas Atlahua	PVEM	Federal deputy (Note: A federal deputy is a member of the Chamber of Deputies.) for the 18th district of Veracruz	9 December 2024	Zongolica	
Jesús Franco Lárraga	Morena	Municipal president of Tancanhuitz, San Luis Potosí	15 December 2024	Huasteca	
Carlos Neri Rodríguez	PVEM	Secretary of the municipal government and aspiring mayoral candidate in Paso del Macho	7 February 2025	Camarón de Tejeda, Veracruz	
José Luis Perriera	PRI	General secretary of the municipal council of Teocaltiche, Jalisco	28 April 2025	Teocaltiche, Jalsico	
Germán Anuar Valencia	MORENA	Mayoral candidate in Coxquihui, Veracruz	29 April 2025	Coxquihui, Veracruz	
Bladimir García Soriano		Director of public works in Ixtaczoquitlán, Veracruz	6 May 2025	Córdoba, Veracruz	
Carlos Manzo	Independent	Municipal president of Uruapan, Michoacán	1 November 2025	Uruapan, Michoacán	

== See also ==
- History of Mexico
- Political murder
- List of journalists and media workers killed in Mexico
