= Luis Pérez Figueroa =

Mexican general (1833–1903)

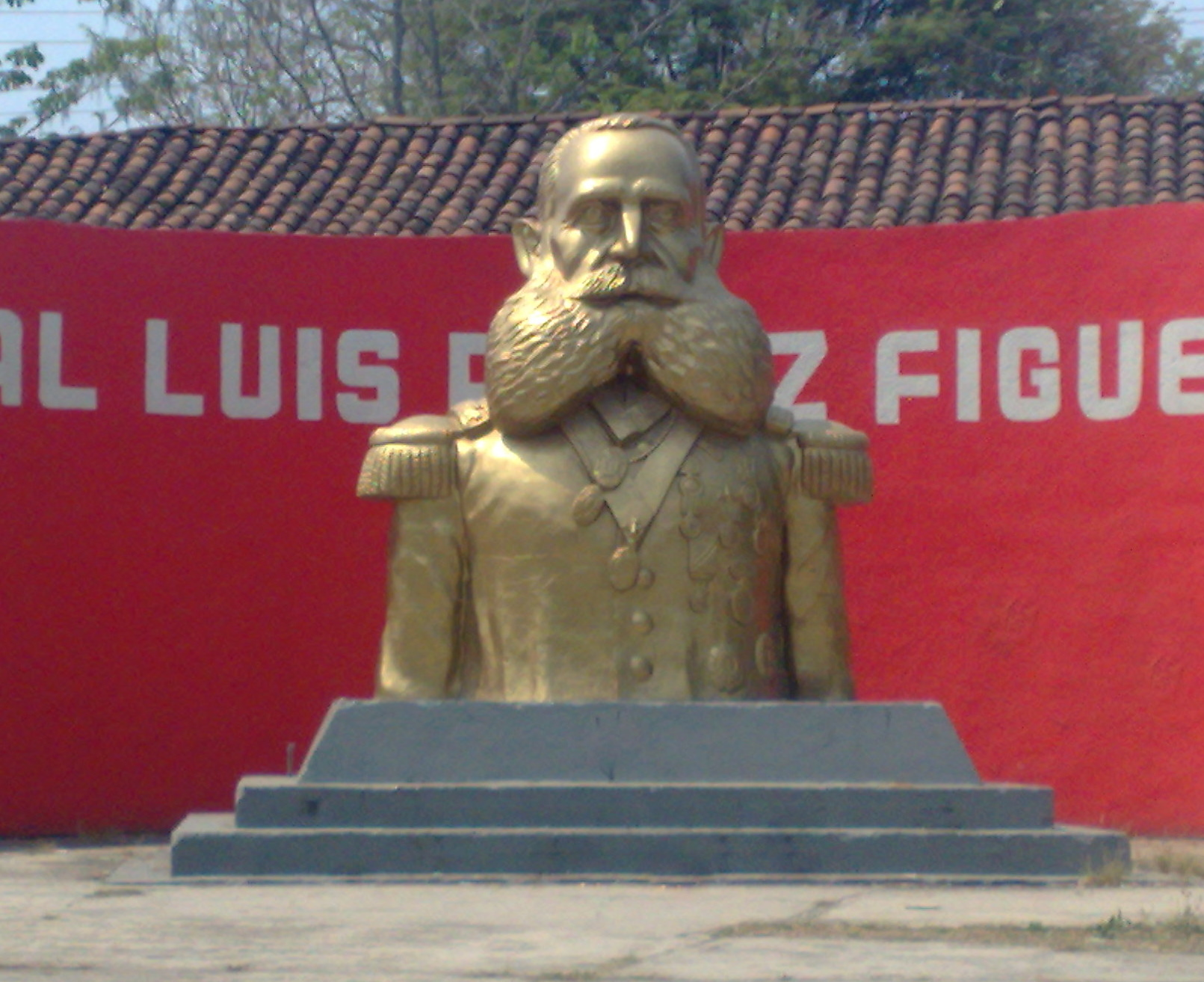
- Monument to Luis Perez Figueroa in Acatlán de Pérez Figueroa
- Born: March 22, 1833; Salvatierra, Guanajuato, Mexico
- Died: May 23, 1903 (aged 70); Tlalpan, Mexico City, Mexico
- Resting place: Panteón Francés (Mexico City)
- Military career
- Allegiance: (Mexico)
- Branch: Mexican Army
- Rank: Divisional general
- Wars: Second French intervention in Mexico; Battle of La Carbonera; Tuxtepec Campaign

Luis Pérez Figueroa (1833 – 1903) was a Mexican general who fought in the French intervention in Mexico.

== Military career ==
Figueroa was born on 22 March 1833 in Salvatierra, Guanajuato. He joined the national army at the age of twenty in March 1853 as a second lieutenant in the infantry, and was promoted to first lieutenant in 1855. He played an active role in the war of intervention, fighting successfully against imperial troops in the mountains of Teotitlan and Tuxtepec. He was a signatory to the Plan which defended the town of Tuxtepec. As a colonel, on 25 April 1865 he defeated French forces at San Miguel Soyaltepec (now covered by the Miguel Aleman Dam), which was renamed Patriótica Villa de San Miguel Soyaltepec in 1868 in honor of this battle. In 1866 he became a brigadier general, and on 18 October 1866 his brigade fought on the right flank under General Porfirio Díaz in the decisive Battle of La Carbonera. Later he was given command of a division.

After the war, the President Benito Juárez became suspicious of Porfirio Díaz's ambitions. Figueroa supported Juárez and urged him to appoint loyal governors in Oaxaca, Veracruz and Puebla, Díaz's power base. Juárez next ordered the disarming of the Oaxacan National Guards. The Zapotecs of the Ixtlan National Guard believed that they had earned the right to bear arms, and felt betrayed by Juárez. At Figueroa's urging, Juárez quietly let the matter rest.

== Honors ==
Figueroa married a Oaxacan woman Angela Garcia Ruiz and had sixteen children. He received various awards for his patriotism and courage, including a medal for the assault and capture of Puebla in 1867. He remained in the army for forty years. He died on May 23, 1903, in Tlalpan in the Federal District of Mexico. His funeral was held with full honors, and was attended by the president of the republic, Porfirio Diaz. In his memory, the Oaxaca state government gave his name in October 1904 to the Acatlán de Pérez Figueroa municipality of the Tuxtepec District, Oaxaca.
