= Eduardo Castro Luque =

Mexican politician

- Born: Eduardo Enrique Castro Luque; 12 December 1963
- Died: 14 September 2012 (aged 48); Ciudad Obregón, Sonora, Mexico
- Cause of death: Shooting
- Education: Sonora Institute of Technology
- Occupations: Politician, businessman
- Known for: 2012 murder
- Political party: Institutional Revolutionary Party
- Spouse: Rossana Coboj
- Children: Eduardo Castro Coboj
- Website: castroluque.com

Eduardo Enrique Castro Luque (12 December 1963 – 14 September 2012) was a Mexican politician affiliated with the Institutional Revolutionary Party (PRI). At the time of his killing, he was a deputy-elect from Ciudad Obregón, Sonora, to the Congress of Sonora.

Born and raised in Ciudad Obregón, Castro Luque ran for office in his municipality and was elected to the Sonora state legislature on 1 July 2012. Before running for office, he had served as the marketing manager of the Yaquis de Obregón baseball team in his hometown and was working at his privately owned publicity agency. On 14 September 2012, two days before taking office, he was gunned down outside his home by gunmen. He was later pronounced dead at a local hospital.

Northern Mexico has been the scene of violent confrontations between Mexico's drug gangs. The recent wave of violence in Ciudad Obregón is attributed to the Sinaloa Cartel and the Beltrán-Leyva Cartel, which fight for the control of retail drug sales and the smuggling routes leading to the United States.

== Personal life ==
Eduardo Enrique Castro Luque was born on 12 December 1963 in the northern Mexican city of Ciudad Obregón, Sonora. He was married to Rossana Coboj and had one boy named Eduardo. He held a bachelor's degree in Business administration from the Sonora Institute of Technology.

The 48-year-old politician had never held a political office before he was elected on 1 July 2012.

Prior to running for office, Castro Luque owned a publicity agency and was the marketing manager of the Yaquis de Obregón baseball team in his hometown.

== Assassination ==
Initial reports stated that on 14 September 2012 at around 20:55 local time, Castro Luque was returning home at Chapultepec neighborhood in Ciudad Obregón. Unaware of the assailant, the deputy-elect got out of his car and made a few steps towards the house entrance when an unknown gunman shot at him nine times, hitting vital organs. Nonetheless, according to the investigation of the Office of the Attorney General of Sonora (PJGE), the gunman faked a malfunction in his motorcycle when Castro Luque was coming back from a meeting held in Hermosillo prior to his installation as a state deputy. The assassin then asked Castro Luque for tool support and then shot him at close range. Once they had materialized the attack, the killer fled the scene in a motorcycle. Castro Luque was taken to a local hospital by his wife and young son while still being alive, but was declared dead an hour later. He was scheduled to take office as a Sonora's state Legislature in just two days.

The Municipal Police of Cajeme, Sonora, reported that Castro Luque's front house door had been forced open and that some people had stolen his laptop a day before the assassination. At the scene, the police found six .45 millimeter bullet casings, as well as six warheads from the same caliber, that will help the office of the Sonora attorney general (PGJE) as evidence for the investigation.

=== Funeral ===
At 3:00 p.m. during a religious ceremony in the Cathedral of Ciudad Obregón, friends, supporters, politicians, and several citizens of the municipality gathered to pay homage to Castro Luque. Bishop Felipe Padilla celebrated mass with over 900 attendees.

=== Background ===
Since the start of Mexico's drug war, northern Mexico has been the scene of numerous battles between several drug trafficking organizations fighting for the control of the local drug markets and the smuggling routes leading to the United States. The municipality of Cajeme, Sonora – where Castro Luque was killed – is reportedly under dispute between two drug groups: the Sinaloa Cartel and the Beltrán-Leyva Cartel.

In August 2012, Édgar Morales Pérez, the mayor-elect of a town in San Luis Potosí, was ambushed and killed by gunmen before taking office. Just like Castro Luque, Morales Pérez was a member of the Institutional Revolutionary Party (PRI).

=== Investigation and arrests ===
The Attorney General of Sonora established a special investigation group to carry out the inquiry of Castro Luque's assassination.

On 24 September 2012, the PGJE indicated that Manuel Ernesto Fernández Félix, the alternate deputy for Ciudad Obregón, ordered the assassination of Castro Luque so he could go into office. (In Mexico, political candidates have to appoint an alternate person (suplente) to take over their duties if they die or are unable to serve.) Sonora authorities accused Fernández Félix of paying a hitman more than US$3000 to carry out the attack and of paying around US$750 to the person who helped him find the assassin. Fernández Félix is currently a fugitive, while the other five implicated in the assassination are arrested. Interpol and authorities in Mexico and the United States are currently looking for the alternate deputy in over 190 countries.

Several water-rights activists, however, question the theory of the Mexican prosecutors that the assassination was carried out by Castro Luque's substitute. The activists of the Citizen Movement for Water stated that Castro Luque had launched a massive political campaign against a water project in Ciudad Obregón, and criticized the state government for constructing an aqueduct despite the judicial orders to suspend it. They allege that since the state of Sonora is ruled by the National Action Party (PAN), the investigation is too biased to be executed properly. Politicians in the Institutional Revolutionary Party (PRI) also expressed their doubts on the theory of the state prosecutors of the PAN administration.

== Legacy ==
Several organizations carried out a "mega march" in Ciudad Obregón in memory of Castro Luque on 26 September 2012.

== See also ==
- Mexican drug war
- Jaime Serrano Cedillo
- List of politicians killed in the Mexican drug war
