= Pie de la Cuesta =

Pie de la Cuesta (Spanish: "foot of the hill") may refer to:

- San Rafael Pie de La Cuesta, in Guatemala
- Pie de la Cuesta, Guerrero, in Mexico
- Pie de la Cuesta, Oaxaca, in Mexico
