= Jaime Serrano Cedillo =

Mexican politician (1967–2012)

- Born: 1967
- Died: 16 September 2012 (aged 44–45); Nezahualcóyotl, State of Mexico, Mexico
- Cause of death: Stabbing
- Resting place: Jardines de Oriente (Cemetery)
- Occupation: Politician
- Known for: 2012 murder
- Political party: PRI
- Spouse: Patricia Grimaldo de la Cruz

Jaime Serrano Cedillo (1967 – 16 September 2012) was a Mexican politician who belonged to the Institutional Revolutionary Party (PRI). At the time of his death, he was serving in the Congress of the State of Mexico representing Nezahualcóyotl, State of Mexico.

He was assassinated on the afternoon of 16 September 2012, reportedly by his wife, inside his home in Nezahualcóyotl. Serrano Cedillo's assassination came just two days after the slaying of Eduardo Castro Luque, a state deputy in Sonora and also a member of the PRI. Unlike other political assassinations in Mexico, Serrano Cedillo's death did not bear the signs of organized crime, and was a result of "a series of deep" marital problems.

== Career and early life ==
Born in 1967, Serrano Cedillo was a close collaborator of Eruviel Ávila Villegas, governor of the State of Mexico from 2011 to 2017.

Prior to his election to the state Congress, Serrano Cedillo was the president of the Institutional Revolutionary Party (PRI) in the municipality of Nezahualcóyotl and a former mayoral candidate for the same locality. In the 1991 mid-terms he was elected to the federal Chamber of Deputies for the State of Mexico's 23rd district. He had also served as the Undersecretary of the Interior in Greater Mexico City until May 2011.

On 5 September 2012, Serrano Cedillo was sworn in as deputy for the XXV District of Nezahualcóyotl.

== Assassination ==
Initial reports indicate that Serrano Cedillo left his house to buy a newspaper at a nearby booth and was stabbed in the chest by someone with a sharp weapon. Serrano Cedillo was reportedly coming out of a public restroom when the attacker surprised him. The assailant then managed to flee the scene and no arrests have been made. Serrano Cedillo, on the other hand, made his way home and was transported to a nearby hospital by his family where he was later pronounced dead. The Mexican authorities indicated on 20 September 2012 that Serrano Cedillo's wife, Patricia Grimaldo de la Cruz, reportedly assassinated her husband after having a dispute that same morning for "profound series of conjugal differences." It was later proven that the assassination happened inside Serrano Cedillo's house and not outside his domicile, as previously stated. Unlike other political assassinations, Serrano Cedillo's death did not bore the signs of organized crime. Mexico's drug gangs typically target local leaders and police chiefs, not federal deputies. Moreover, stabbing is not typically a method Mexico's drug trafficking use to do their "dirty work," hinting the officials that the deputy's death was a personal attack.

He was the second PRI politician killed in just two days; Eduardo Castro Luque, a deputy-elect of the state of Sonora, was shot dead by unknown assailants on 14 September 2012. In August 2012, Édgar Morales Pérez of the PRI was also shot and killed by gunmen.

=== Funeral ===
After the Municipal Committee of the PRI paid tribute to the fallen Serrano Cedillo on 17 September 2012, he was buried in Jardines de Oriente cemetery.

=== Aftermath ===
The government deployed more than 1,000 troops to Nezahualcóyotl as a response to the assassination of Serrano Cedillo under a military-led program called Operation Neza. This was the first time since the start of Mexico's drug war in 2006 that soldiers have been deployed at this scale near the nation's capital. In Nezahualcóyotl, a city with around 1.1 million people and part of the Mexico City's metropolitan area, is home to a turf war between Los Zetas and La Familia Michoacana, two drug trafficking organizations that fight for the growing drug market and illegal goods in the region.

The troops were finally relocated from Nezahualcóyotl on 3 November 2012 after Operation Neza concluded.

== See also ==
- Mexican drug war
- List of politicians killed in the Mexican drug war
