= Acatlán de Pérez Figueroa =

- Municipality and town
- Location in Mexico
- Coordinates: 18°32′N 96°36′W
- Country: Mexico
- State: Oaxaca

Area
  - Total: 933.9 km^{2} (360.6 sq mi)

Population (2005)
  - Total: 42,347
- Time zone: UTC-6 (Central Standard Time)

Acatlán de Pérez Figueroa is a town and municipality in Oaxaca in southeastern Mexico. It is part of the Tuxtepec District of the Papaloapan Region. The name "Acatlán" means "among the reeds". Luis Pérez Figueroa was a general.

== Geography ==
The municipality covers an area of 933.9 km^{2} at an altitude of 120 meters above sea level. The lower part is in the coastal plain of the Gulf of Mexico. Some of the hills rise to 300 meters. The climate is warm, with average temperature of 25 °C and variable rainfall. The Miguel Alemán Lake in the south is used for water sports and sport fishing.

=== Flora and fauna ===
Trees include Mulato, oak, pine, fig and fir. Fruits trees are soursop, pomegranate, nanche, tamarind, mango, avocado, orange, almond, guava, black sapote, sapodilla child, mamey sapote, sapodilla, banana and lemon. Wildlife includes badger, monkey, armadillo, wild boar, Zereth, tepexcuintle, raccoon, brocket deer, opossums, wild cat, skunk, rabbit, gopher, deer, oncillas, bobcat, coyote, squirrel and opossum.

== People ==
As of 2005, the municipality had a total population of 42,347 of whom 4,757 spoke an indigenous language. Agriculture includes cultivation of corn, rice, coffee, fruit and sugar cane. The woods are exploited for precious woods such as mahogany and cedar. Animal husbandry includes breeding pigs and cattle, and medium-scale poultry farming. The municipality has the "Ingenio La Margarita" sugar processing facility.

== Gallery ==
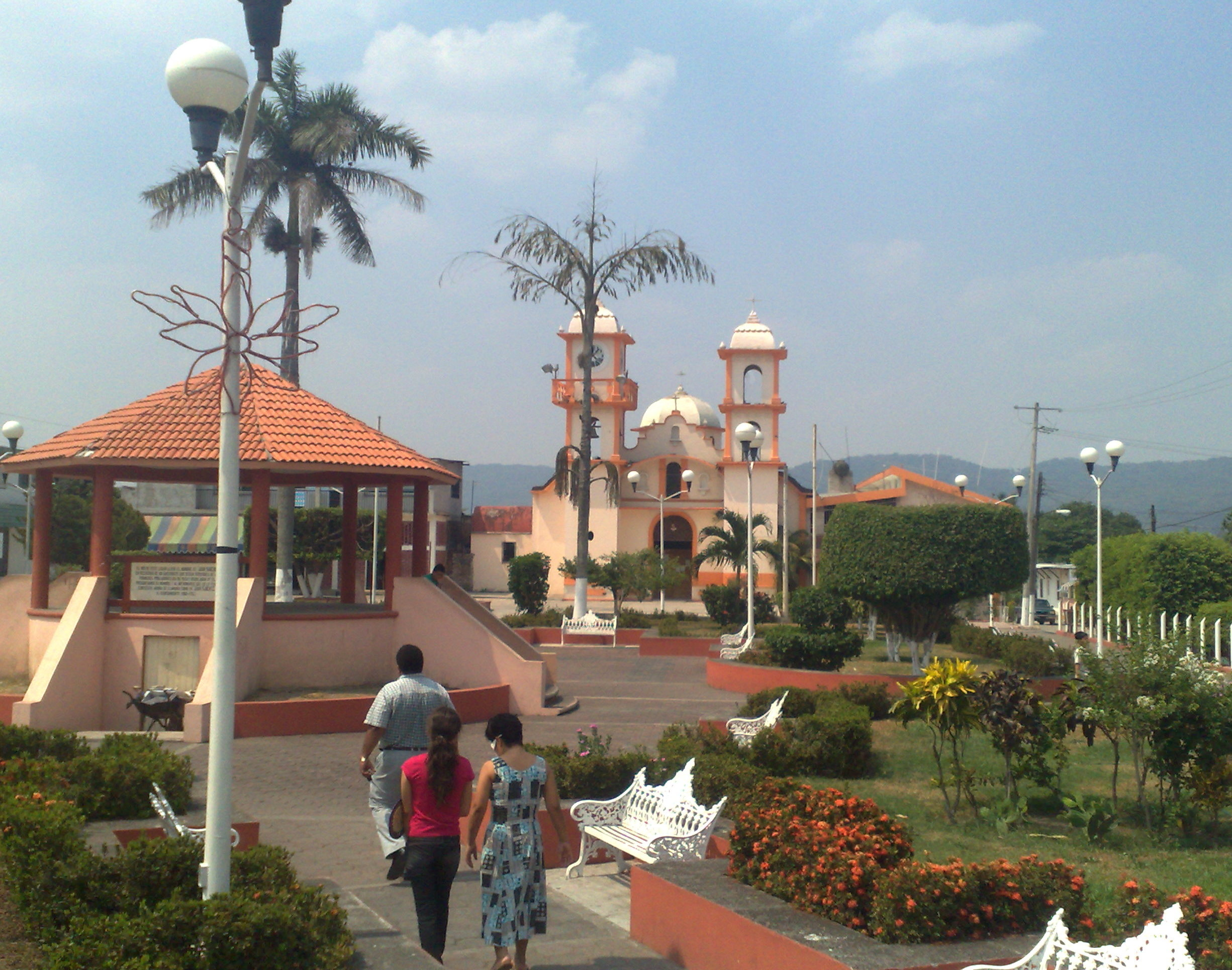
Centenario park in Acatlán de Pérez Figueroa

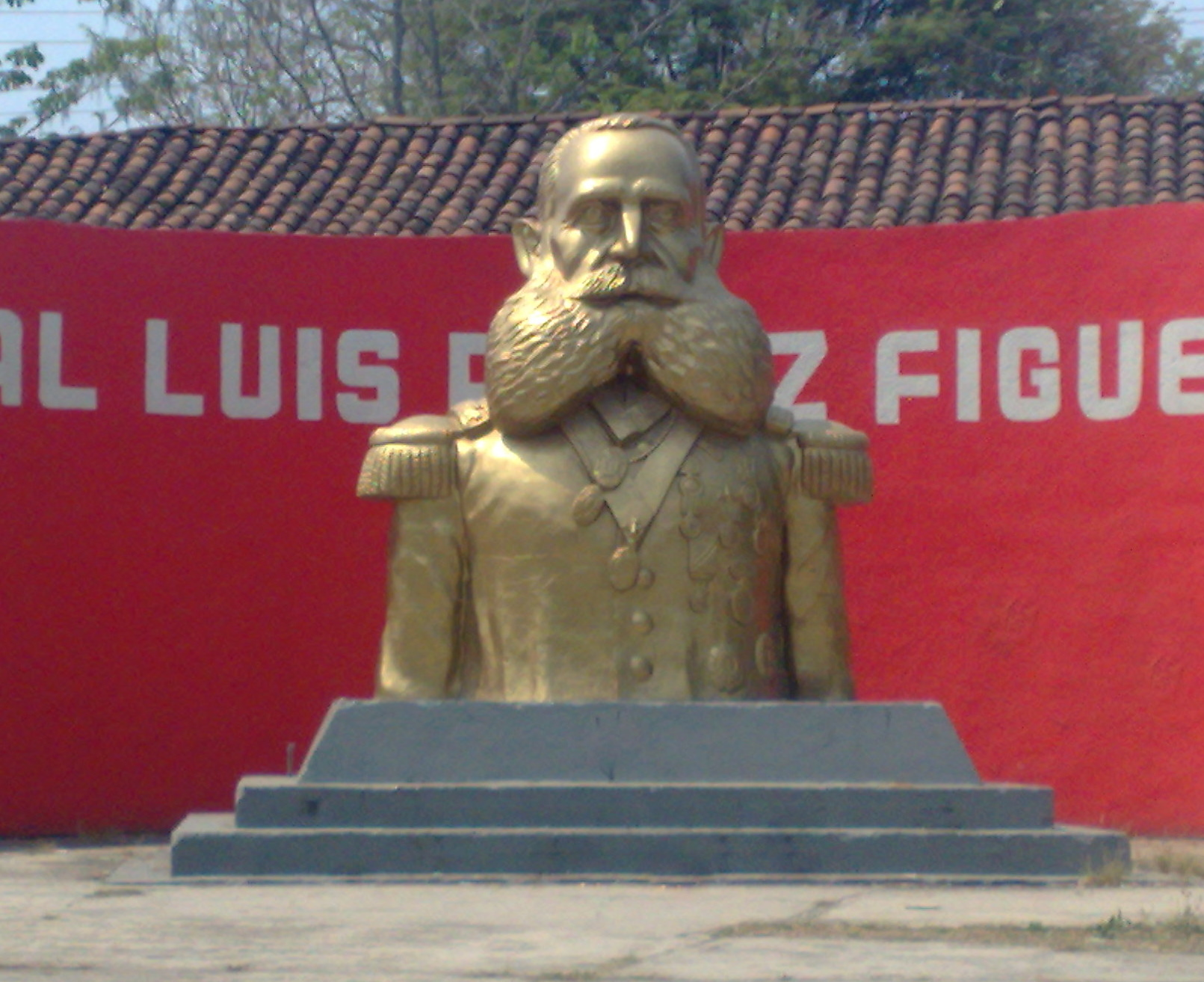
Monument to the illustrious general Luis Perez Figueroa

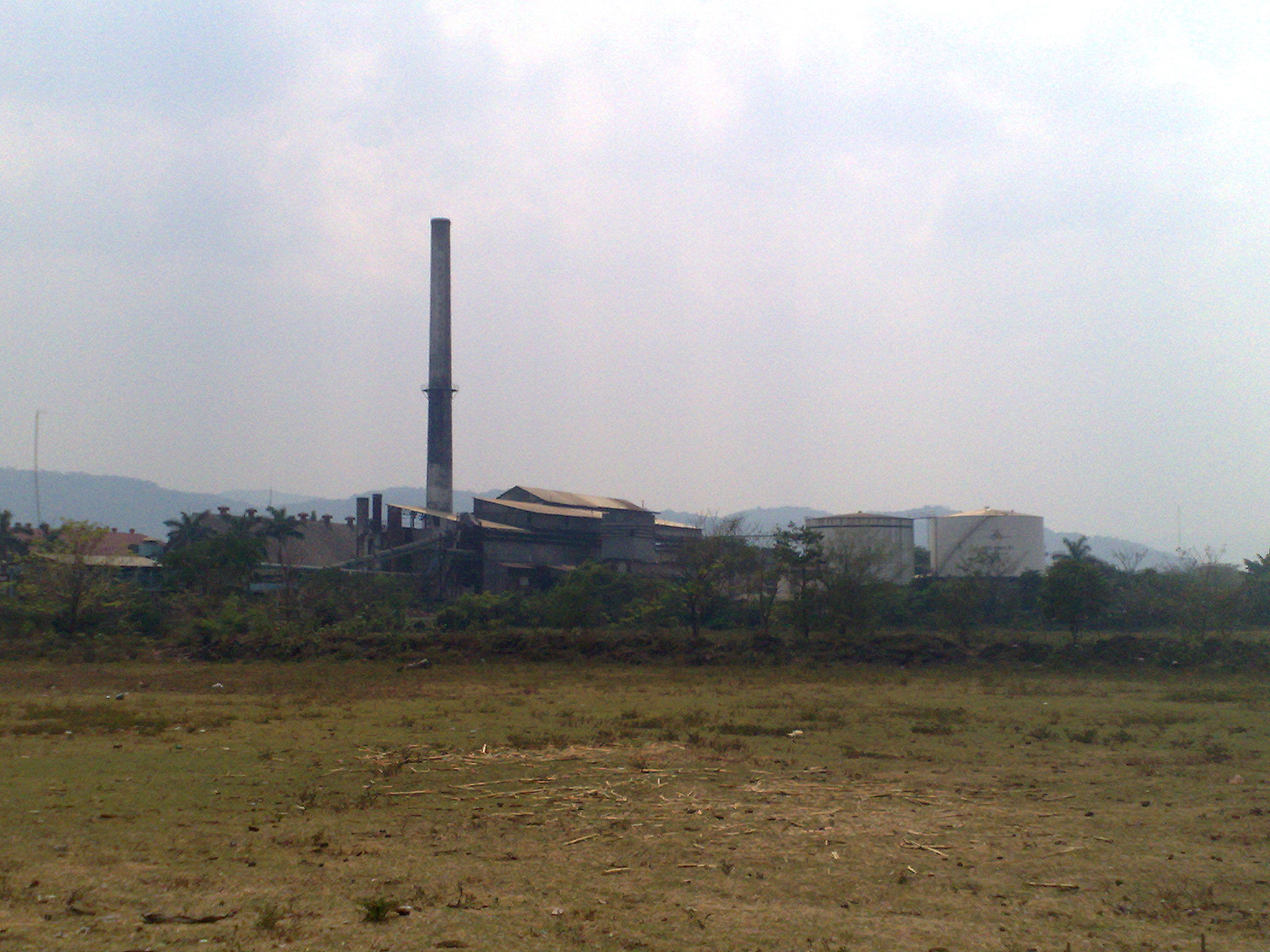
Ingenio Pablo Machado Ll. "La Margarita" located in Vicente Camalote
