= San José Independencia =

- Municipality and town
- Location within Oaxaca Location within Mexico
- Coordinates: 18°15′N 96°39′W
- Country: Mexico
- State: Oaxaca

Area
  - Total: 58.75 km^{2} (22.68 sq mi)

Population (2005)
  - Total: 3,689
- Time zone: UTC-6 (Central)
- Website: https://sanjoseindependencia.gob.mx/

San José Independencia is a town and municipality in Oaxaca in south-western Mexico. The municipality covers an area of 58.75 km^{2}. It is part of the Tuxtepec District of the Papaloapan Region.

In 2020, the municipality had a total population of 4,251, up from 3,689 in 2005.
