= Ayotzintepec =

- Municipality and town
- Location within Oaxaca Location within Mexico
- Coordinates: 17°40′N 96°08′W
- Country: Mexico
- State: Oaxaca

Area
  - Total: 169.69 km^{2} (65.52 sq mi)

Population (2005)
  - Total: 6,424
- Time zone: UTC-6 (Central Standard Time)

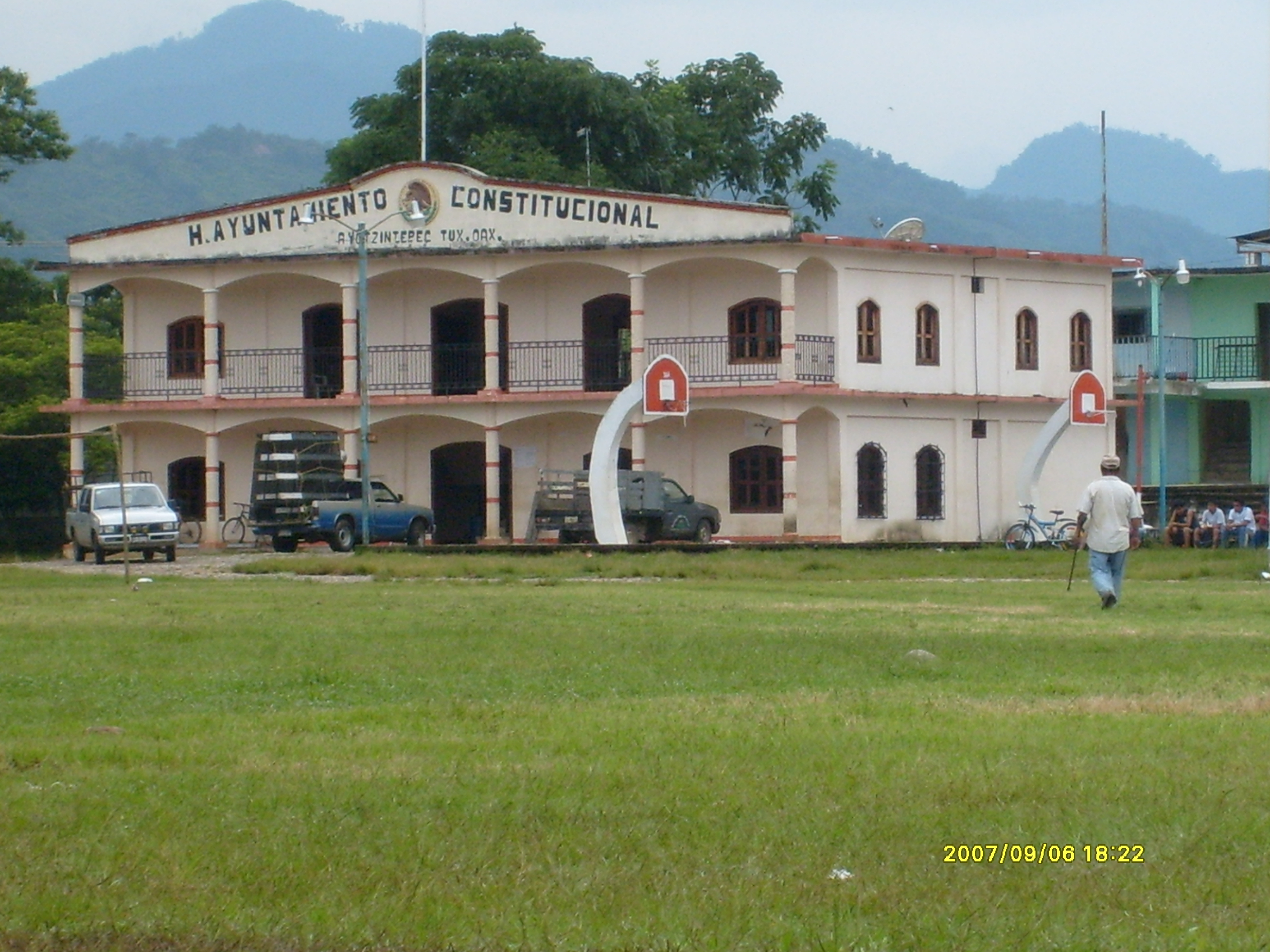
The Municipal Palace of Ayotzintepec City Hall

Ayotzintepec is a town and municipality in Oaxaca in southern Mexico. The municipality covers an area of 169.69 km^{2}. It is part of the Tuxtepec District of the Papaloapan Region.

In 2020, the municipality had a total population of 6,857, up from 6,524 in 2005.
