= Santa María Jacatepec =

- Location within Mexico
- Coordinates: 17°51′N 96°12′W
- Country: Mexico
- State: Oaxaca
- Municipality: Santa María Jacatepec
- Time zone: UTC-6 (Central (US Central))

Santa María Jacatepec is a town and municipality located in the state of Oaxaca 11 km north of the Valle Nacional. "Jacatepec" comes from Nahuatl meaning 'on jackal hill.' It is part of the Tuxtepec District of the Papaloapan Region, and is only 30 meters above sea level.

== The town ==
The town had its origins when the residents of San Juan Palantla needed to escape an epidemic that devastated the village. First they established a village they called Valle Real; however, because of the place's bad location, they moved on to several farming areas called San Pedro Ozumasín, San Mateo Yetla and Santa María Jacatepec. The last was established as a town in 1650 and then as at municipality in 1896.

Near the town are 3 springs called Tzul Zul, Paraíso Escondido and Arroyo Blanco which have been converted into recreational parks.

== The municipality ==
As municipal seat, Jacatepec has governing authority over the following communities:

Boca de Perro, Cerro Caballo, Cerro Concha, Cerro de Viento, Cinco de Oro, Colonia Emiliano Zapata, Ejido Adalberto Vélez, El Diamante, El Fortín II, El Guayabo, El Hule (La Hulera), El Porvenir, Emiliano Zapata, La Florida, La Joya de Santa María, Lacatepec, La Nueva Esperanza, La Nueva Soledad, La Reforma, La Soledad, Loma del Carmen, Macedonio Alcalá, Nuevo Faisán, Nuevo Málzaga, Rancho Alegre, Rancho Faisán, Rancho Gavilán, Rancho Manantial, San Agustín, San Lorenzo, San Martín, Santa Sofía, Vega del Sol, and Vuelta Abajo (Lucero Alto)

== Climate ==
Climate data for Santa María Jacatepec (1991–2020 normals, extremes 1953–present)
Month	Jan	Feb	Mar	Apr	May	Jun	Jul	Aug	Sep	Oct	Nov	Dec	Year
Record high °C (°F)	37.5 (99.5)	39 (102)	42.5 (108.5)	45.5 (113.9)	46.5 (115.7)	46 (115)	39 (102)	38.5 (101.3)	39 (102)	39.5 (103.1)	37 (99)	37 (99)	46.5 (115.7)
Mean daily maximum °C (°F)	26.6 (79.9)	28.7 (83.7)	31.5 (88.7)	34.5 (94.1)	35.2 (95.4)	34.1 (93.4)	33.0 (91.4)	33.0 (91.4)	32.2 (90.0)	30.7 (87.3)	28.6 (83.5)	27.3 (81.1)	31.3 (88.3)
Daily mean °C (°F)	21.9 (71.4)	23.2 (73.8)	25.4 (77.7)	27.8 (82.0)	28.9 (84.0)	28.5 (83.3)	27.5 (81.5)	27.6 (81.7)	27.2 (81.0)	25.9 (78.6)	23.8 (74.8)	22.6 (72.7)	25.9 (78.6)
Mean daily minimum °C (°F)	17.1 (62.8)	17.8 (64.0)	19.3 (66.7)	21.2 (70.2)	22.5 (72.5)	22.8 (73.0)	22.1 (71.8)	22.1 (71.8)	22.1 (71.8)	21.0 (69.8)	19.1 (66.4)	17.9 (64.2)	20.4 (68.7)
Record low °C (°F)	6 (43)	8 (46)	10 (50)	11 (52)	17 (63)	15 (59)	13.5 (56.3)	15 (59)	15.5 (59.9)	13.5 (56.3)	10 (50)	8 (46)	6 (43)
Average precipitation mm (inches)	123.3 (4.85)	76.4 (3.01)	76.7 (3.02)	99.0 (3.90)	184.6 (7.27)	544.7 (21.44)	657.9 (25.90)	710.2 (27.96)	737.0 (29.02)	473.5 (18.64)	253.1 (9.96)	128.9 (5.07)	4,065.3 (160.05)
Average precipitation days	12.4	9.3	7.4	7.2	9.9	19.0	21.9	21.1	22.7	17.0	12.8	11.0	171.7
Source: Servicio Meteorológico Nacional
