= Armando Chavarría Barrera =

Mexican politician (1956–2009)

- Born: 27 August 1956; Iguala, Guerrero, Mexico
- Died: 20 August 2009 (aged 52); Chilpancingo de los Bravo, Guerrero, Mexico
- Occupation: Politician
- Political party: PRD

Armando Chavarría Barrera (27 August 1956 – 20 August 2009) was a Mexican politician affiliated with the Party of the Democratic Revolution. He served as Senator of the LVIII and LIX Legislatures of the Mexican Congress representing Guerrero and as Deputy of the LVII Legislature.

On 20 August 2009 Chavarría was murdered when he was leaving his house.

== See also ==
- List of politicians killed in the Mexican drug war
