= Tuxtepec District =

- District
- Oaxaca regions and districts: Papaloapan to the Northeast
- Coordinates: 18°6′N 96°7′W
- Country: Mexico
- State: Oaxaca

Population (2020)
  - Total: 427,134

Tuxtepec District is located in the north of the Papaloapan Region of the State of Oaxaca, Mexico. It is the northernmost district in Oaxaca.

== Municipalities ==
Tuxtepec municipalities

The district includes the following municipalities:

Municipality code	Name	Population		Land Area			Population density	
Municipality code	Name	2020	Rank	km^{2}	sq mi	Rank	2020	Rank
002	Acatlán de Pérez Figueroa	45,167	2	754.6	291.4	2	60/km^{2} (155/sq mi)	7
009	Ayotzintepec	6,857	13	157.5	60.8	10	44/km^{2} (113/sq mi)	11
021	Cosolapa	14,488	8	112.2	43.3	12	129/km^{2} (334/sq mi)	3
044	Loma Bonita	40,934	3	485.9	187.6	5	84/km^{2} (218/sq mi)	5
134	San Felipe Jalapa de Díaz	28,500	5	134.5	51.9	11	212/km^{2} (549/sq mi)	1
136	San Felipe Usila	12,191	9	447.5	172.8	7	27/km^{2} (71/sq mi)	14
166	San José Chiltepec	11,310	10	193.2	74.6	9	59/km^{2} (152/sq mi)	8
169	San José Independencia	4,251	14	53.93	20.82	14	79/km^{2} (204/sq mi)	6
184	San Juan Bautista Tuxtepec	159,452	1	877	339	1	182/km^{2} (471/sq mi)	2
559	San Juan Bautista Valle Nacional	23,067	6	684.4	264.2	4	34/km^{2} (87/sq mi)	12
232	San Lucas Ojitlán	22,185	7	454.9	175.6	6	49/km^{2} (126/sq mi)	10
278	San Miguel Soyaltepec	38,682	4	743.5	287.1	3	52/km^{2} (135/sq mi)	9
309	San Pedro Ixcatlán	10,368	11	101.9	39.3	13	102/km^{2} (264/sq mi)	4
417	Santa María Jacatepec	9,682	12	324.4	125.3	8	30/km^{2} (77/sq mi)	13
	Distrito Tuxtepec	427,134	—	5,525	2,133.21	—	77/km^{2} (200/sq mi)	—
Source: INEGI

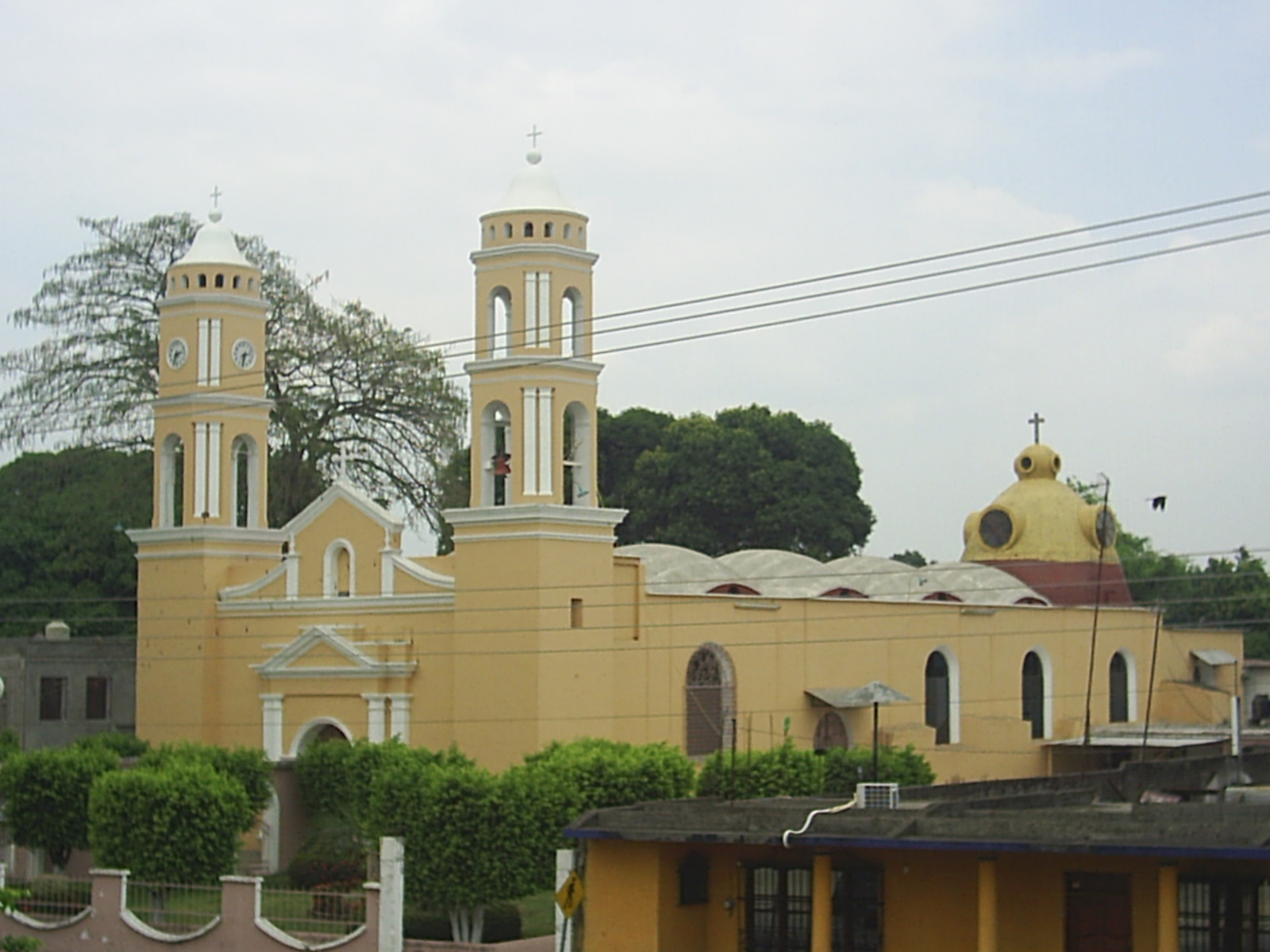
Tuxtepec Cathedral

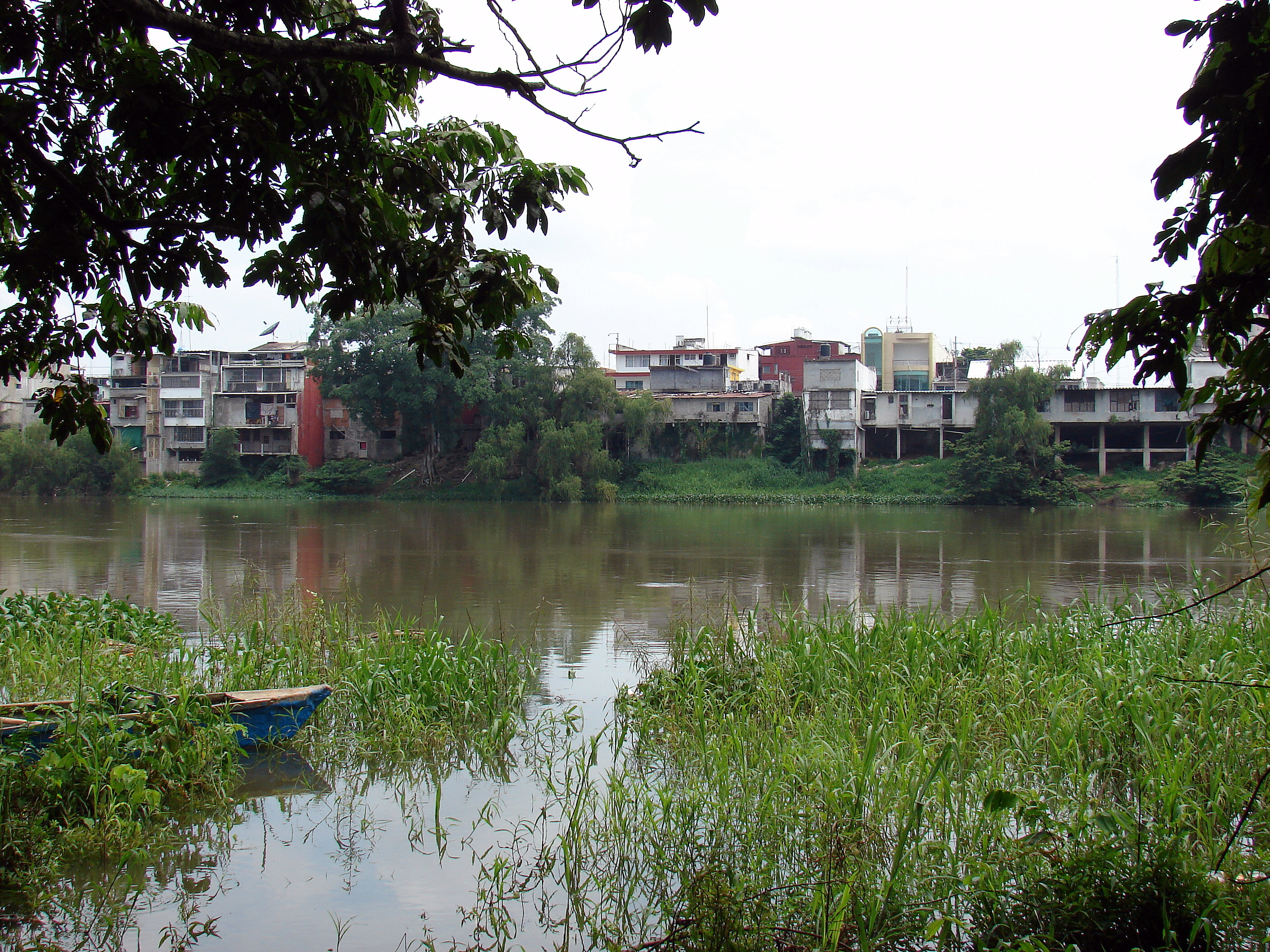
Tuxtepec from the Papaloapan river

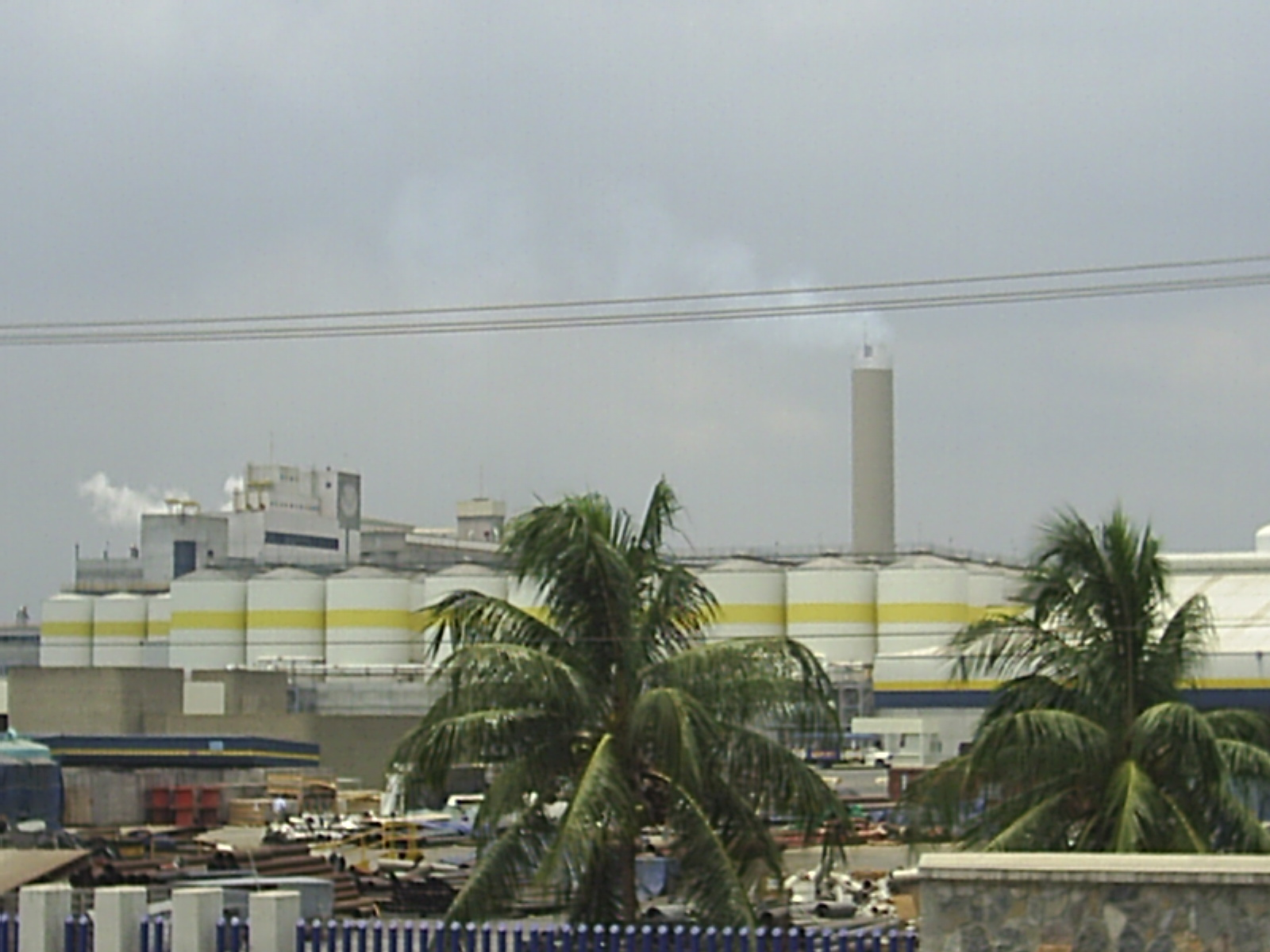
Trópico brewery

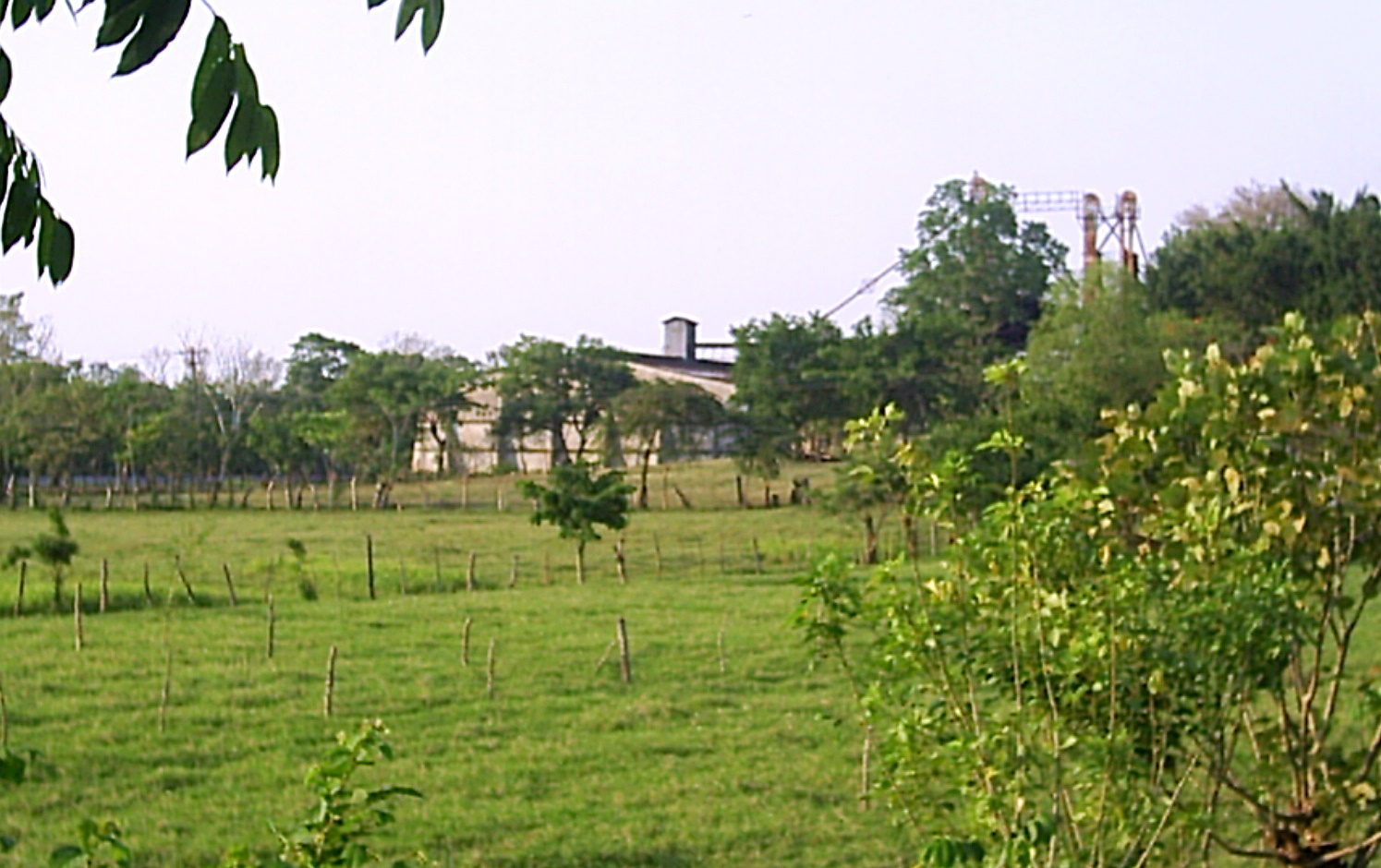
Old rice fields in El Desengaño
