= Loma Bonita =

Loma Bonita Oaxaca
- Municipality and town
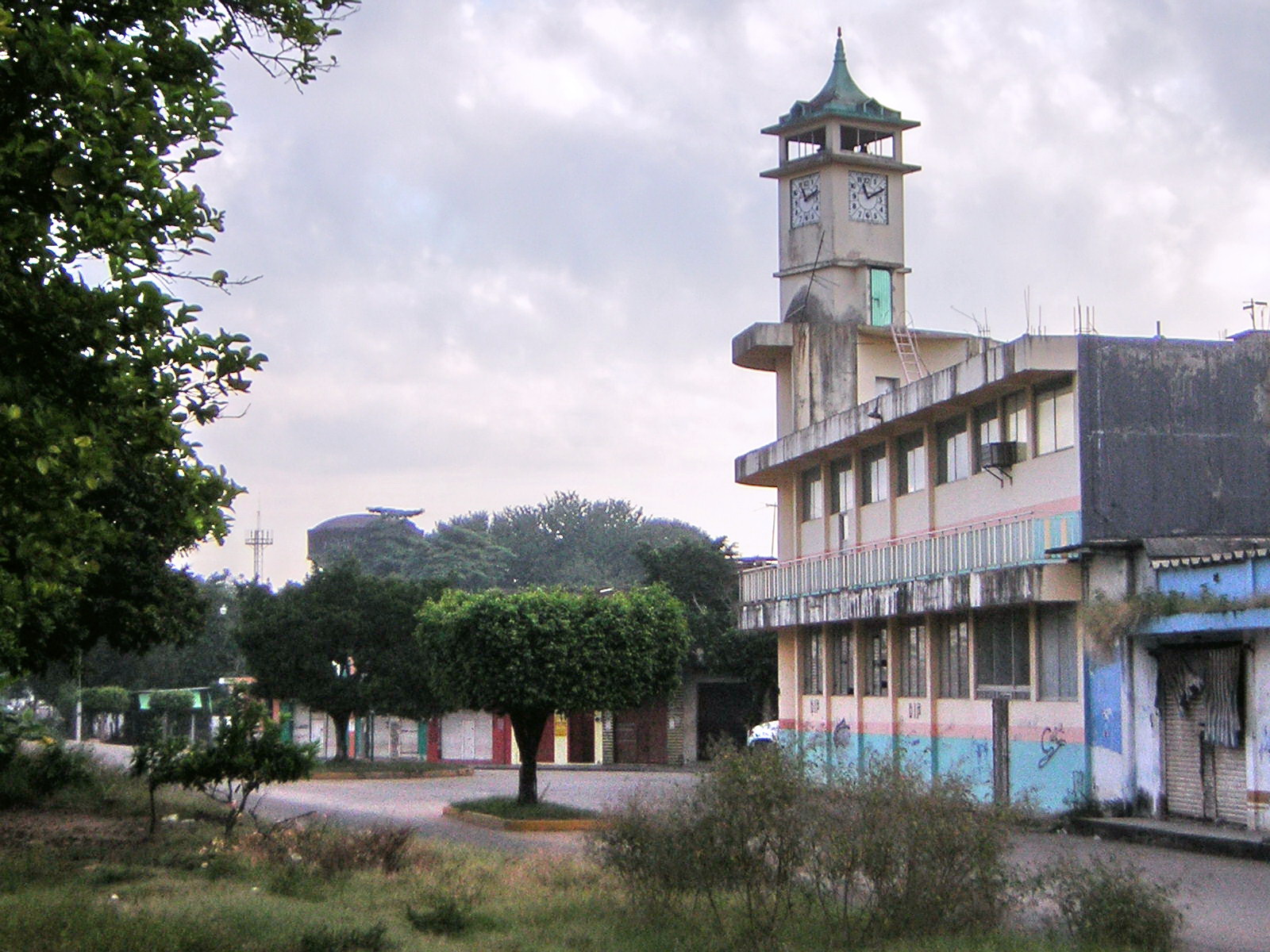
- Municipal library, Oaxaca, Mexico

- Location in Mexico
- Coordinates: 18°06′N 95°53′W
- Country: Mexico
- State: Oaxaca

Area
  - Total: 588.15 km^{2} (227.09 sq mi)
  - Town: 11.4 km^{2} (4.4 sq mi)

Population (2020)
  - Total: 40,934
  - Density: 69.598/km^{2} (180.26/sq mi)
  - Town: 31,469
  - Town density: 2,760/km^{2} (7,150/sq mi)
- Time zone: UTC-6 (Central Standard Time)

Loma Bonita, Oaxaca is a town and municipality in Oaxaca, Mexico. It is part of the Tuxtepec District of the Papaloapan Region. As of 2020, the municipality had a population of 40,943.

== History ==
Loma Bonita began as a neighborhood with American residents, who were attracted to the area's fertile land. In 1940, the pineapple industry arrived in the area. The settlement began as several campsites, established by young Americans in the Oaxaca/Veracruz border area. The town's entrance features a bronze statue of "El Ponitero", a pineapple picker cutting and collecting this fruit in a basket on his back.

Loma Bonita began as a camp between two villages, Pedro Salomón and Provo Medina, and a railroad connecting Veracruz to Suchiate. In the 1940s, the pineapple industry became a major industry.

== Culture ==
=== Festivals ===
One of the most important local events is the annual Feria de la Piña (Pineapple Festival).

== Geography ==
Loma Bonita is home to fertile lands. The two rivers that cross Loma Bonita are the Papaloapan River and the Obispo River. The municipality covers an area of 588.15 square kilometres and is located approximately 36 kilometres from the Tuxtepec District in Oaxaca, Mexico.

=== Climate ===
The weather in Loma Bonita is typically warm, with abundant rainfall. The municipality has both a wet and dry season and throughout the year temperatures will vary from 10°C to 31°C.

== Economy ==
Loma Bonita became a productive place for trade. The Mexican Agricultural and Land Company bought some extensions of Loma Bonita as a business opportunity.

Another agricultural product is sugarcane as this municipality is located within the Oaxaca region, one of Mexico's top sugarcane-producing areas.
