= Pie de la Cuesta, Oaxaca =

Town in Oaxaca, Mexico

Pie de la Cuesta
- Town
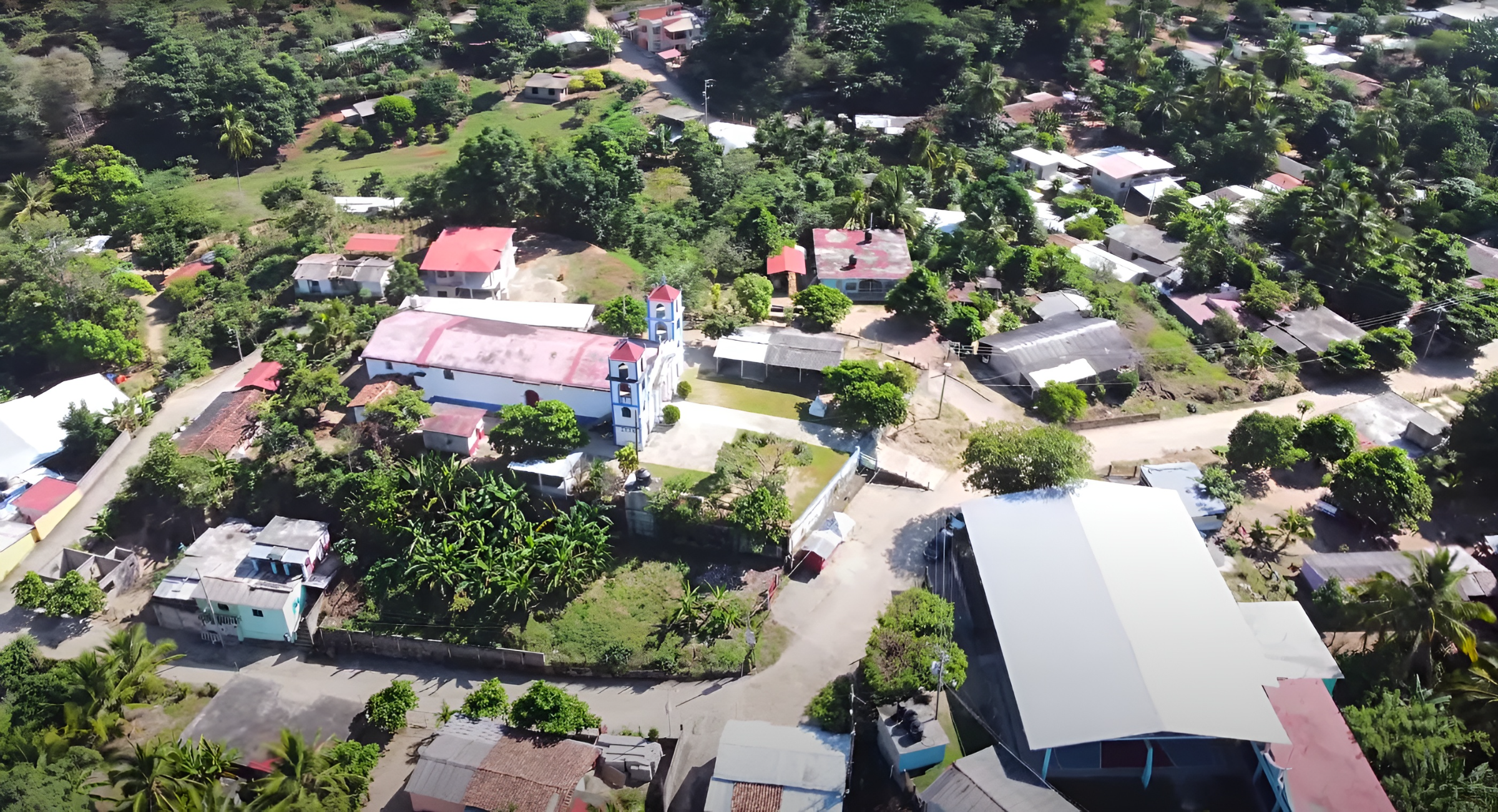
- Aerial view of Pie de la Cuesta.

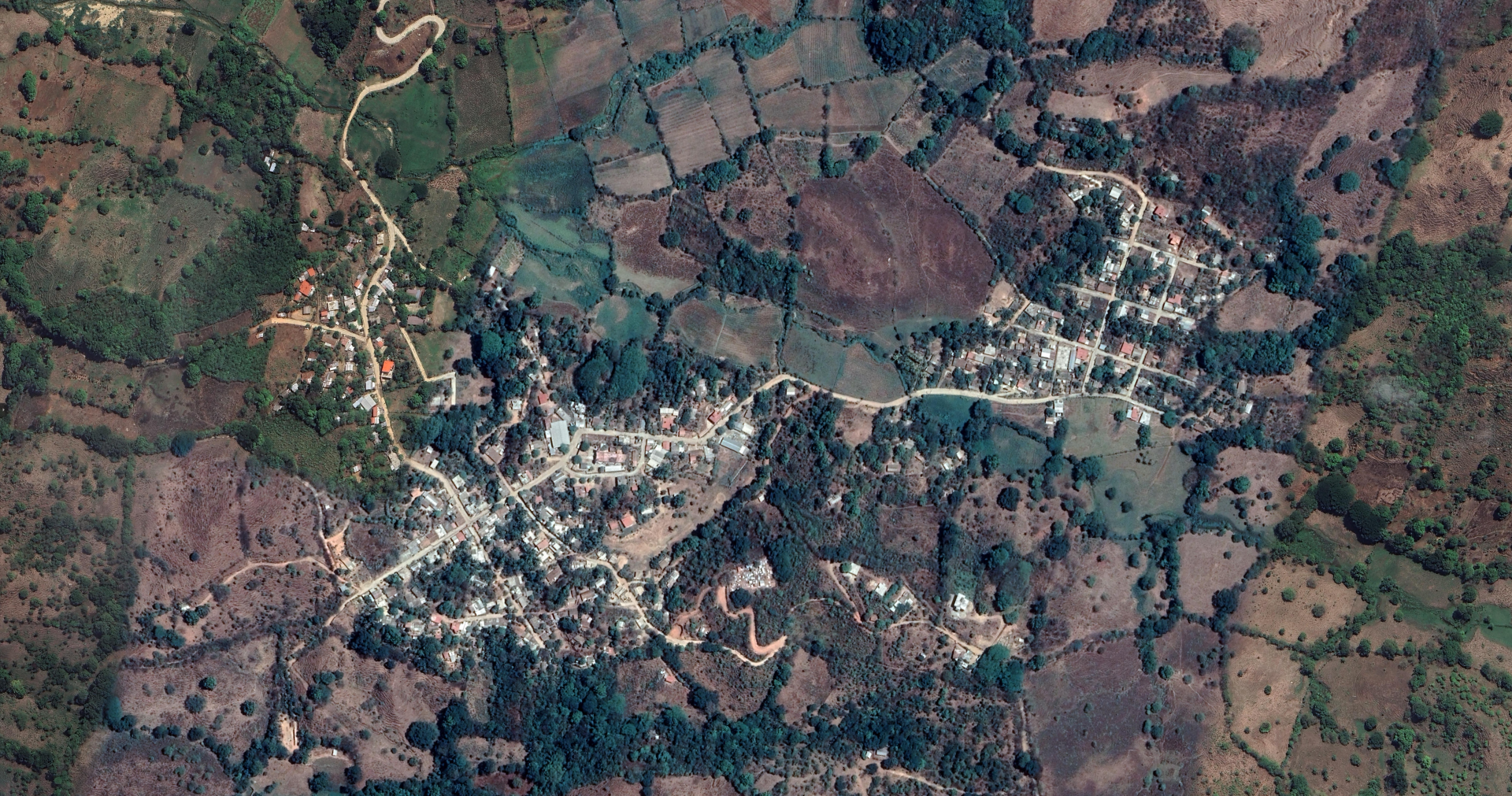
- Satellite view of Pie de la Cuesta

- Location within Oaxaca Location within Mexico
- Coordinates: 16°37′15″N 98°07′35″W
- Country: Mexico
- State: Oaxaca
- Municipality: San Juan Cacahuatepec

Population
  - Total: 717
- Time zone: UTC-6:00 (Central)
- Postal code: 71610

Pie de la Cuesta is a town located in the Coast region of the State of Oaxaca, in Mexico, in the southeast of the country, 300 km south of Mexico City. Pie de la Cuesta is part of the municipality of San Juan Cacahuatepec, the municipality number 185 out of 570 of the state of Oaxaca. It has a population of 717 inhabitants. The language spoken in this town is Spanish.

The outskirts of Pie de la Cuesta are mountainous. The closest highest point is 729 meters above mean sea level, 2.0 km north of Pie de la Cuesta. The surroundings of Pie de la cuesta are sparsely populated, with 35 inhabitants per square kilometer. The closest town is San Juan Cacahuatepec, 3.1 km west of Pie de la Cuesta.

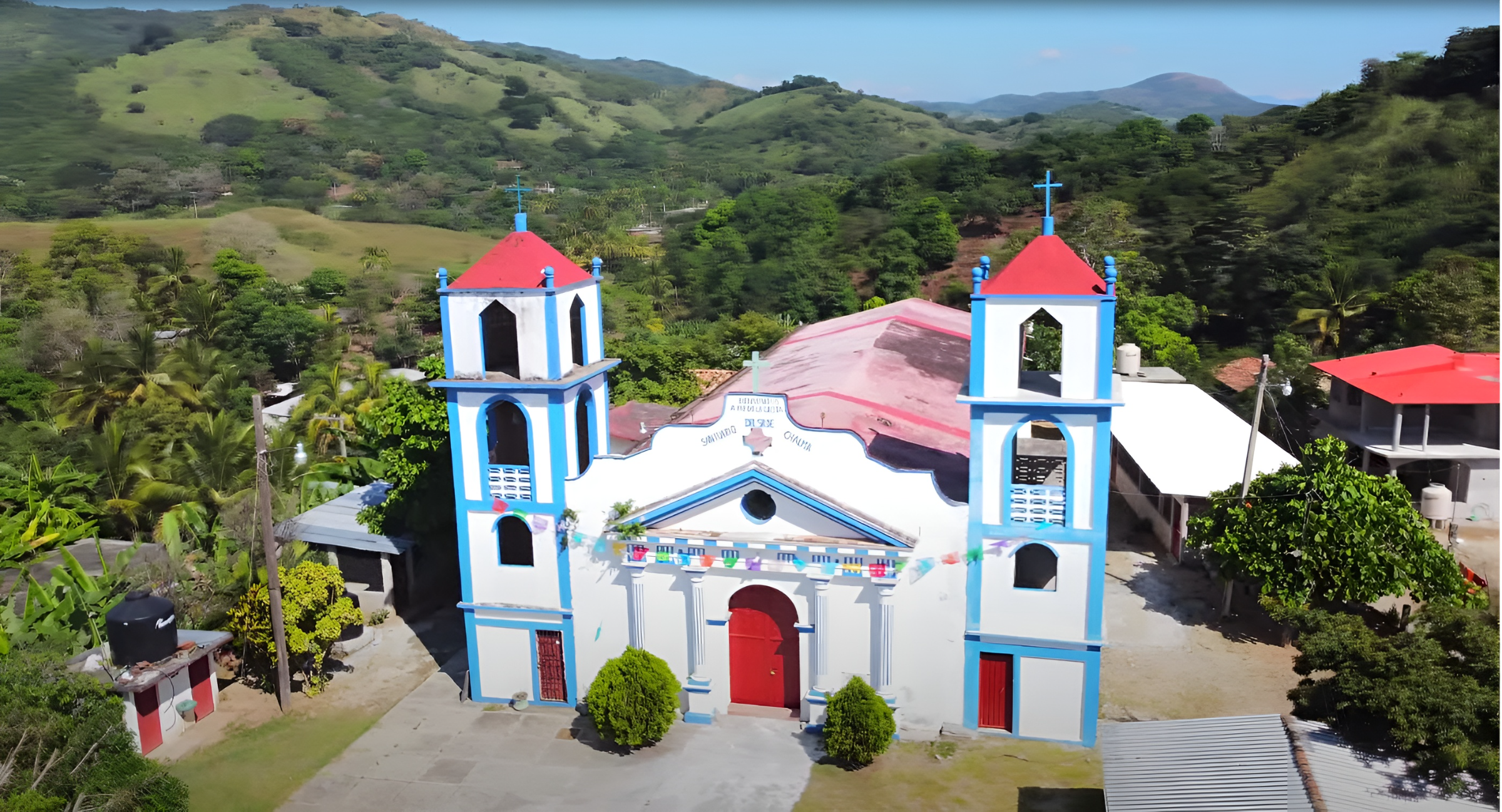

== Demographics ==
Pie de la cuesta has 717 inhabitants, of whom 376 are women and 341, men. 431 inhabitants are adults and 92 are older than 60 years.

There are a total of 171 private homes.

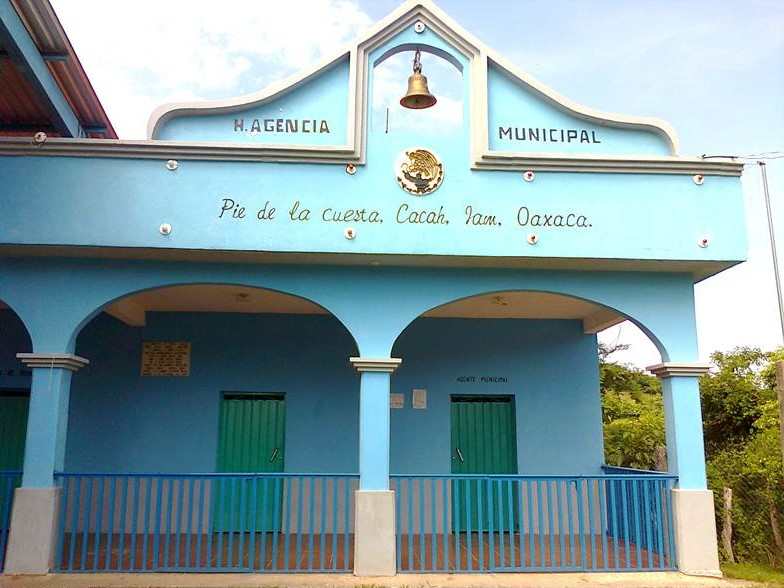

== Culture ==
The population of Pie de la Cuesta is mainly Roman Catholic. Holidays like Christmas, Day of the Dead, and Holy Week are celebrated.

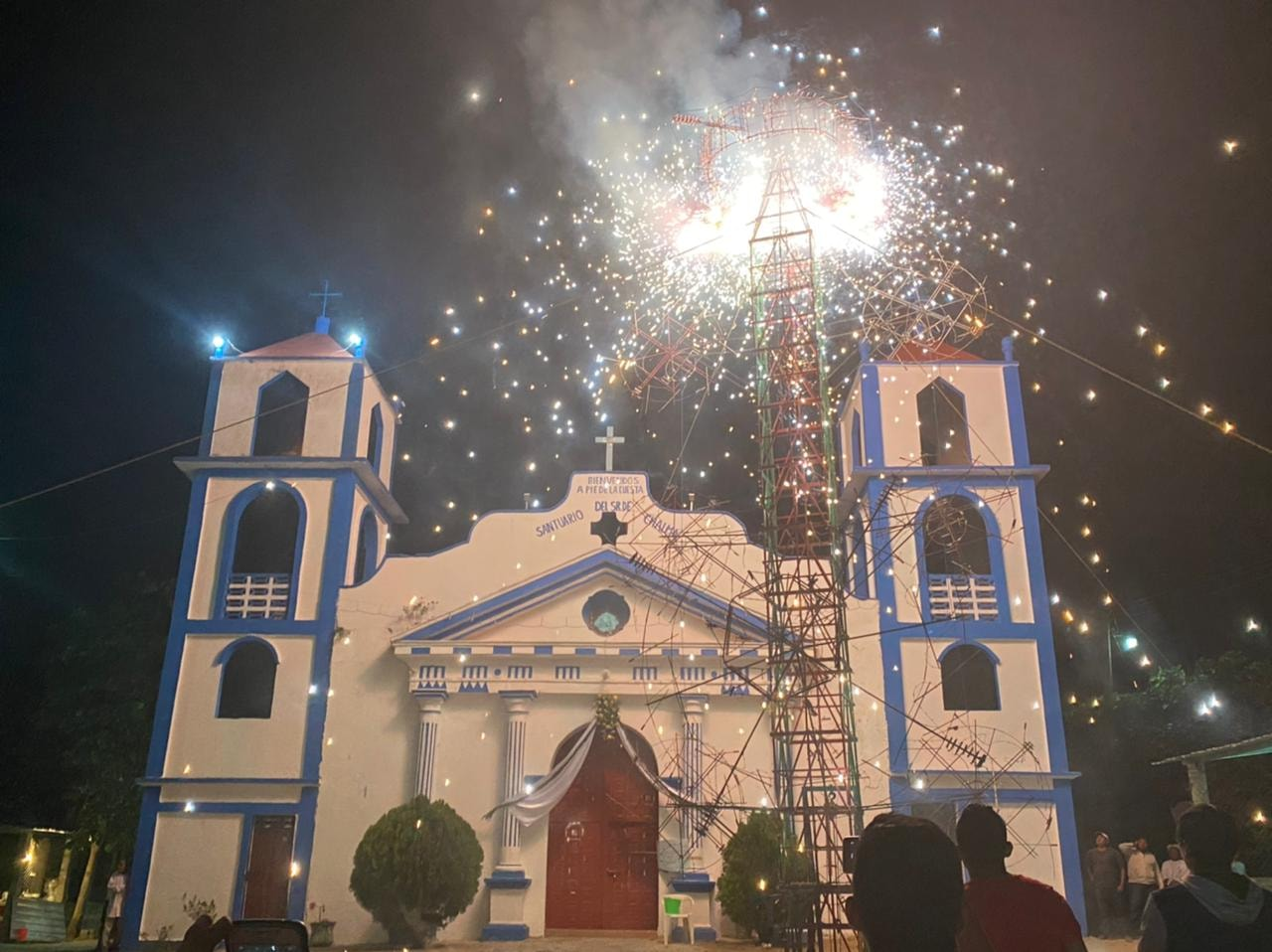

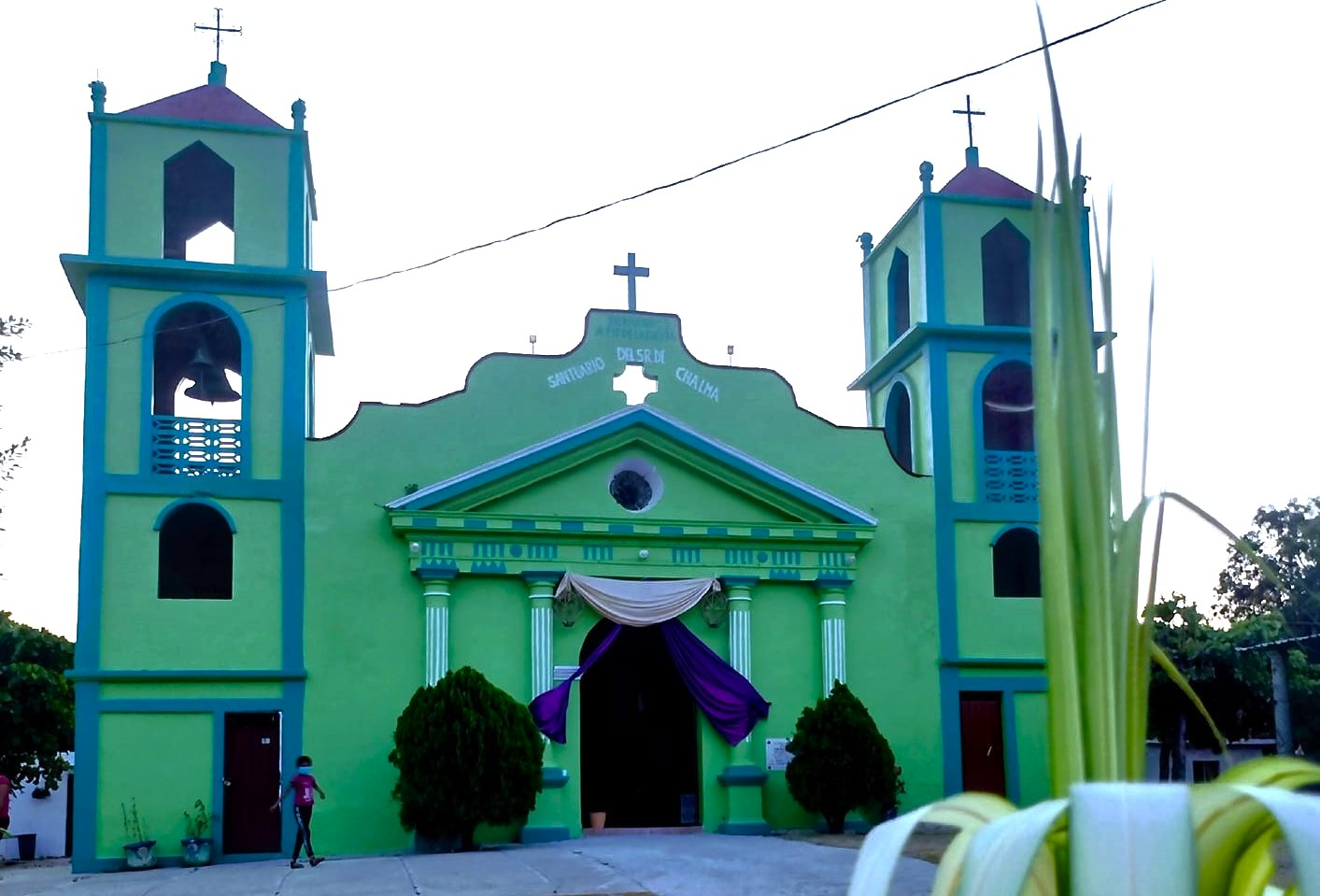
