= San Juan Cacahuatepec =

- Municipality and town
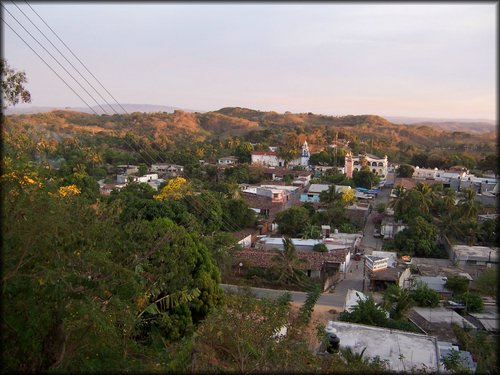

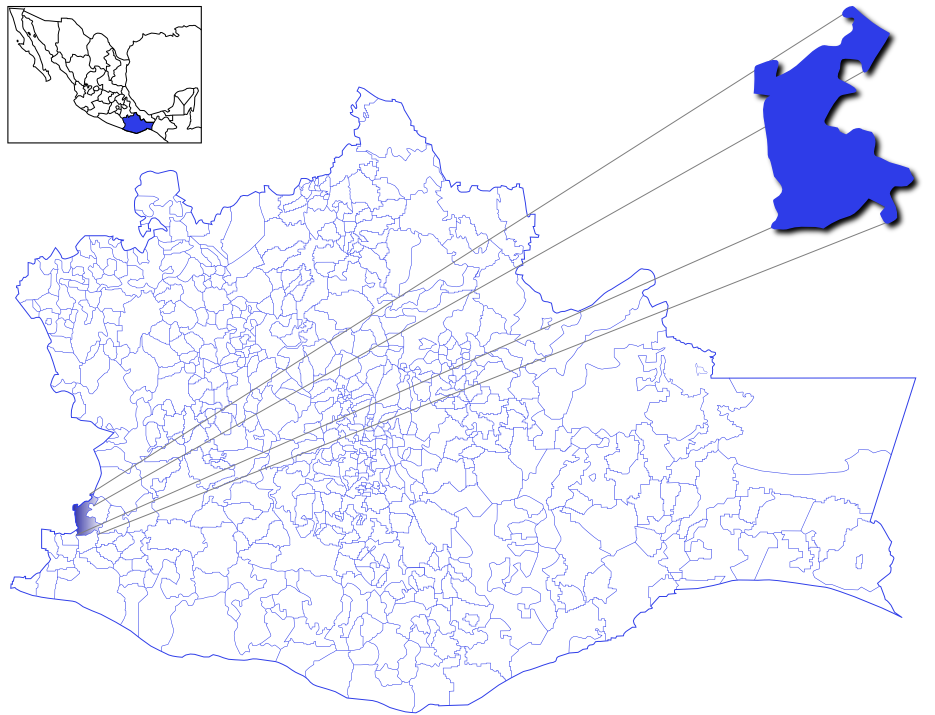
- Location of the municipality in Oaxaca

- Location in Mexico
- Coordinates: 16°37′N 98°09′W
- Country: Mexico
- State: Oaxaca

Area
  - Total: 153.1 km^{2} (59.1 sq mi)

Population (2005)
  - Total: 8,134
- Time zone: UTC-6 (Central Standard Time)

San Juan Cacahuatepec is a city in the Mexican state of Oaxaca, near the border with Guerrero. It is located in the Jamiltepec District in the west of the Costa Region. Its population in 1990, according to The Columbia Gazetteer of North America, was 3,116; in 2006, it was about 5,000. Along with San Pedro Amusgos, it is a heavy center of population for the indigenous Amuzgo. The name Cacahuatepec is Nahuatl, translating "Place of Cacao-bean mountain".

Agriculture of the area includes corn, beans, sugarcane, rice, and tropical fruits. The closest town to San Juan Cacahuatepec is Pie de la Cuesta.

== History ==
Once inhabited by Yopes, the area came under dominion of Spain in 1523. Several times it has been impacted by unrest in the region. It was a gathering point for rebel forces of Hermenegildo Galeana in the early 19th century, and later, in 1854, it was razed by Antonio López de Santa Anna.
