= Zapotitlán Tablas (municipality) =

Municipality in the Mexican state of Guerrero

- Municipality
- Location in Mexico
- Coordinates: 16°59′N 98°45′W
- Country: Mexico
- State: Guerrero
- Municipal seat: Zapotitlán Tablas

Area
  - Total: 820.9 km^{2} (317.0 sq mi)

Population (2005)
  - Total: 9,601

Zapotitlán Tablas is a municipality in the Mexican state of Guerrero. The municipal seat lies at Zapotitlán Tablas. The municipality covers an area of 820.9 km^{2}.

In 2005, the municipality had a total population of 9,601.
