= Zapotitlán Tablas =

City in the Mexican state of Guerrero

- Municipal seat and city
- Location within Guerrero Location within Mexico
- Coordinates: 17°26′12″N 98°46′32″W
- Country: Mexico
- State: Guerrero
- Municipality: Zapotitlán Tablas
- Time zone: UTC-6 (Zona Centro)

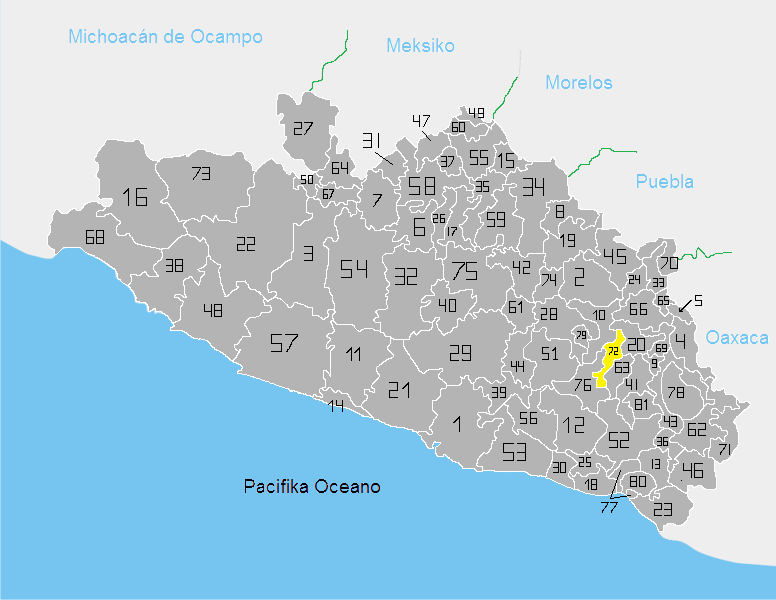
Location of Zapotitlán Tablas within Guerrero

Zapotitlán Tablas is a city and seat of the municipality of Zapotitlán Tablas, in the state of Guerrero, southern Mexico.

== Geography ==
=== Climate ===
Climate data for Zapotitlán Tablas (1951–2010)
Month	Jan	Feb	Mar	Apr	May	Jun	Jul	Aug	Sep	Oct	Nov	Dec	Year
Record high °C (°F)	36.0 (96.8)	38.0 (100.4)	39.5 (103.1)	40.5 (104.9)	41.0 (105.8)	39.5 (103.1)	36.0 (96.8)	35.5 (95.9)	34.5 (94.1)	35.5 (95.9)	36.5 (97.7)	35.0 (95.0)	41.0 (105.8)
Mean daily maximum °C (°F)	26.5 (79.7)	27.9 (82.2)	29.3 (84.7)	30.2 (86.4)	30.0 (86.0)	28.1 (82.6)	26.9 (80.4)	27.1 (80.8)	26.2 (79.2)	26.6 (79.9)	27.0 (80.6)	26.9 (80.4)	27.7 (81.9)
Daily mean °C (°F)	17.8 (64.0)	18.9 (66.0)	20.6 (69.1)	22.0 (71.6)	22.4 (72.3)	21.6 (70.9)	20.5 (68.9)	20.5 (68.9)	20.1 (68.2)	19.9 (67.8)	19.1 (66.4)	18.4 (65.1)	20.2 (68.4)
Mean daily minimum °C (°F)	9.0 (48.2)	10.0 (50.0)	11.8 (53.2)	13.7 (56.7)	14.8 (58.6)	15.0 (59.0)	14.1 (57.4)	13.9 (57.0)	14.1 (57.4)	13.1 (55.6)	11.2 (52.2)	10.0 (50.0)	12.6 (54.7)
Record low °C (°F)	1.0 (33.8)	2.0 (35.6)	2.5 (36.5)	2.0 (35.6)	4.0 (39.2)	4.0 (39.2)	4.0 (39.2)	4.0 (39.2)	4.0 (39.2)	7.0 (44.6)	4.0 (39.2)	2.0 (35.6)	1.0 (33.8)
Average precipitation mm (inches)	8.0 (0.31)	6.8 (0.27)	7.8 (0.31)	20.9 (0.82)	47.7 (1.88)	168.1 (6.62)	169.6 (6.68)	151.5 (5.96)	140.8 (5.54)	75.9 (2.99)	14.0 (0.55)	9.8 (0.39)	820.9 (32.32)
Average precipitation days (≥ 0.1 mm)	1.0	0.9	1.0	2.1	5.4	13.4	16.5	14.1	14.4	7.7	1.5	1.0	79.0
Source: Servicio Meteorologico Nacional
