= Édgar Morales Pérez =

Mexican mayor

- The late Morales Pérez
- Died: 12 August 2012; Matehuala, San Luis Potosí, Mexico
- Cause of death: Shooting
- Resting place: Jardines de la Luz (Cemetery)
- Education: Instituto Tecnológico de Matehuala
- Occupations: Politician, Civil engineer
- Known for: 2012 murder
- Political party: Institutional Revolutionary Party
- Spouse: Noelia Cortez de Morales

Édgar Morales Pérez was the mayor-elect of Matehuala, San Luis Potosí, Mexico, elected on July 1, 2012. He was a member of the Institutional Revolutionary Party (PRI) and the Ecologist Green Party of Mexico (PVEM), which are in a coalition in his municipality. The National Action Party (PAN) had ruled Matehuala for several years, and Morales Pérez was scheduled to take office in September 2012.

On August 12, 2012, he and his campaign manager Juan Francisco Hernández Colunga were killed by gunfire while driving home from a birthday party. Hernández's wife survived the attack but could not identify the perpetrators. Several publications described the attack as part of a broader crime wave. Three days earlier a van with fourteen corpses in the back had been found next to a highway in the state. In Veracruz on August 12, a family of seven, including four children, were found beheaded. In the state of Michoacán that same week, gangsters burned several buses and engaged in gun battles with the Mexican authorities. The Mexican authorities believe that the criminal group known as Los Zetas was behind the attack, and five municipal police officers have been arrested for their alleged involvement in the dual assassination.

== Personal life and family ==
Morales Pérez was born into an entrepreneur family, and studied at Civil Engineering at the Instituto Tecnológico de Matehuala. Upon graduation, he began working for Constructions Tribasa, a construction company that allowed him to participate in several infrastructure projects in Mexico and Guatemala. He then created his own construction company and began offering services to the municipality of Matehuala. He became popular in Matehuala for financing sport events and dance contests. In early 2012, the Institutional Revolutionary Party (PRI) recruited Morales Pérez and proposed him for the municipal candidacy. He was survived by his wife, Noelia Cortez de Morales, and his three children.

== Assassination ==
On August 12, 2012, Morales Pérez and his campaign manager, Juan Francisco Hernández Colunga, were driving home from a quinceañera party at around 1:45 a.m. when several gunmen ambushed them in the streets of the city of Matehuala, San Luis Potosí. The ambush took place just 60 meters away from the party, when two white Honda vehicles carrying a total of nine gunmen shot at Morales Pérez's vehicle after they tried to get away. Both of them died at the scene, while Claudia Martínez de Hernández, the wife of Hernández Colunga and the only living witness, was gravely injured and was taken to the nearest hospital; she could not identify the perpetrators. The Mexican authorities received the emergency call of the attack at around 2:00 a.m. and went to the scene, but Morales Pérez was found dead in the back seat of the car, while his campaign manager died in the driver's seat. More than 100 .223 and 7.62 mm caliber shells were found at the crime scene.

The killers were not found but the Mexican authorities indicated that Los Zetas were the probable perpetrators of the attack.

=== Background ===
The state of San Luis Potosí experienced an increase in drug-related violence several months prior to Morales Pérez's assassination. According to official figures, 39 people were murdered in July 2012 in the state, compared to the 13 killed during the same month in 2011. In the first two weeks of August 2011, 33 people were killed, including the gruesome discovery of 14 mutilated bodies inside a van on August 9. Later that day, the death toll reached 21 dead after the Mexican Army and members of organized crime engaged in several gun battles throughout the state. The state authorities contributed the wave of violence to an infighting between rival groups of Los Zetas that fight for the control of San Luis Potosí. Reportedly, the 14 bodies found inside the van were members of the Coahuila-based faction of Los Zetas led by Iván Velázquez Caballero. Those who carried out the attack were killers supposedly under the orders of Miguel Treviño Morales. Other Mexican sources indicate that the feud between the Zeta factions are between Treviño Morales and Heriberto Lazcano. In addition, the surge in violence across the state may be partially attributed to the high summer temperatures throughout Mexico, since extreme weather conditions alter the patterns of drug harvesting and force the cartels to look for other sources of revenue during that time of the year. The "summer effect" – a term coined by Alejandro Hope, a security specialist – leads for more people to spend time outdoors, making criminal activities more visible, like drug sales, for example. In addition, the school calendar results in the absence of parental supervision, facilitating teenage recruitment by the drug trafficking organizations.

Hope argues that the media outlets have played an important role in the perception of the drug violence documented in August 2012 in Mexico. The Mexican newspaper Milenio reported more than 38 killings throughout the country on August 9, 2012. Although these figures received a lot of coverage, Mexico experiences a rate of 60 drug-related murders per day, but these killings usually never make it to the national media and are rarely reported. Consequently, Hopes argues that the increase in violence may simply be "the spectacle of violence and not violence itself."

Los Zetas have had a stronghold in the state of San Luis Potosí for several years; back in February 2011, gunmen of the Zetas cartel ambushed and killed the U.S. agent Jaime Zapata while traveling through the Pan American Highway.

=== Funeral ===
The mass ceremony and burial of Morales Pérez and his campaign manager were held on August 13. More than 1,000 people attended the ceremony, including local politicians and former mayors of Matehuala. After the mass was over, a mariachi group played songs in memory of Morales Pérez and Hernández Colunga outside the chapel where the mass was held as their coffins were taken to Jardines de la Luz cemetery.

=== Aftermath ===
San Luis Potosí governor Fernando Toranzo Fernández responded by calling on federal military forces to reinforce law enforcement throughout the state.

In response to the drug-related murders in San Luis Potosí, the Mexican government deployed 15,735 federal agents to seven states across Mexico on August 14, 2012. Of these, 11,835 are from the Mexican Armed Forces and 3,900 are from the Federal Police.

Five police officers from the municipality of Matehuala were detained on August 17, 2012 for their alleged participation in the assassination of Morales Pérez. According to the evidence presented by the authorities, the police officers were watching over at the party where Morales Pérez was present but were reportedly "called to the station" just before the attack occurred. Nonetheless, their involvement in the crime and the reason for the attack remains unknown.

In honor of Morales Pérez, the municipality of Matehuala cancelled the celebration of the Mexican Independence Day on 16 September 2012.

The Institutional Revolutionary Party (PRI) appointed Héctor Fermín Ávila Lucero as the mayor of Matehuala on 21 September 2012.

== See also ==
- Mexican drug war
- List of politicians killed in the Mexican drug war
