= 2015 in Mexico =

- Decades: 1990s; 2000s; 2010s; 2020s
- See also: History of Mexico; List of years in Mexico; Timeline of Mexican history

This is a list of events that happened in 2015 in Mexico. The article also lists the most important political leaders during the year at both federal and state levels.

== Incumbents ==
=== Federal government ===
- President: Enrique Peña Nieto PRI
- Interior Secretary (SEGOB): Miguel Ángel Osorio Chong
- Secretary of Foreign Affairs (SRE)
  - José Antonio Meade, until August 25
  - Claudia Ruiz Massieu, starting August 27
- Communications Secretary (SCT): Gerardo Ruiz Esparza
- Education Secretary (SEP)
  - Emilio Chuayffet, until August 27
  - Aurelio Nuño Mayer, starting August 27
- Secretary of Defense (SEDENA): Salvador Cienfuegos Zepeda
- Secretary of Navy (SEMAR): Vidal Francisco Soberón Sanz
- Secretary of Labor and Social Welfare (STPS):
- Secretary of Welfare (BIENESTAR)
  - Rosario Robles, until August 27
  - José Antonio Meade, starting August 27
- Tourism Secretary (SECTUR):
  - Claudia Ruiz Massieu, until August 27
  - Enrique de la Madrid Cordero, starting August 27
- Secretary of the Environment (SEMARNAT)
  - Juan José Guerra Abud, until August 27
  - Rafael Pacchiano Alamán, starting August 27
- Secretary of Health (SALUD): Mercedes Juan López
- Secretary of Finance and Public Credit, (SHCP): Luis Videgaray Caso

=== Governors ===
- Aguascalientes: Carlos Lozano de la Torre PRI
- Baja California: Francisco Vega de Lamadrid PAN
- Baja California Sur
  - Marcos Covarrubias Villaseñor PAN, until September 10
  - Carlos Mendoza Davis PAN, starting September 10
- Campeche
  - Fernando Ortega Bernés PRI, until September 15
  - Alejandro Moreno Cárdenas PRI, starting September 16
- Chiapas: Manuel Velasco Coello PVEM
- Chihuahua: César Horacio Duarte Jáquez PRI
- Coahuila: Rubén Moreira Valdez, PRI
- Colima: Mario Anguiano Moreno, PRI
- Durango: Jorge Herrera Caldera PAN
- Guanajuato: Miguel Márquez Márquez, PAN
- Guerrero
  - Rogelio Ortega Martínez, Interim governor, until October 27
  - Héctor Astudillo Flores PRI, since October 27
- Hidalgo: Francisco Olvera Ruiz PRI
- Jalisco: Aristóteles Sandoval PRI
- State of Mexico: Eruviel Ávila Villegas PRI
- Michoacán
  - Salvador Jara Guerrero PRI, Substitute governor until September 30
  - Silvano Aureoles Conejo PRD, starting October 1
- Morelos: Graco Ramírez PRD.
- Nayarit: Roberto Sandoval Castañeda PRI
- Nuevo León
  - Rodrigo Medina de la Cruz PRI, until October 4
  - Jaime Rodríguez Calderón ("El Bronco"), Independent, starting October 4
- Oaxaca: Gabino Cué Monteagudo MC
- Puebla: Rafael Moreno Valle Rosas, PAN
- Querétaro: José Calzada, PRI
- Quintana Roo: Roberto Borge Angulo, PRI
- San Luis Potosí
  - Fernando Toranzo Fernández PRI, until September 25
  - Juan Manuel Carreras PRI, since September 26
- Sinaloa: Mario López Valdez, PAN
- Sonora
  - Guillermo Padrés Elías PAN, until September 12
  - Claudia Pavlovich Arellano PRI, starting September 13
- Tabasco: Arturo Núñez Jiménez PRD
- Tamaulipas: Egidio Torre Cantú, PRI
- Tlaxcala: Mariano González Zarur PRI
- Veracruz: Javier Duarte de Ochoa PRI
- Yucatán: Rolando Zapata Bello PRI
- Zacatecas: Miguel Alonso Reyes PRI
- Head of Government of the Federal District: Miguel Ángel Mancera, Independent

== Events ==
=== January ===
- January 7: CENAPRED reported that ash from recent explosions coats the snow on the Popocateptl volcano's upper slopes.
- January 29: An explosion occurred in a maternal hospital in Cuajimalpa, Mexico City, leaving 7 dead and 60 injured.

=== February ===
- February 13: A bus crashes with a freight train in the Mexican state of Nuevo León, killing at least sixteen people and injuring 30.
- February 28: Mexican security forces arrest drug lord Servando Gómez Martínez in Morelia, Michoacán.

=== March ===
- March 3: During the international tour, in search of foreign investment, President Enrique Peña Nieto, makes various economic, financial and cultural agreements with the Queen Elizabeth II.

=== April ===
- April 4: Lunar Eclipse
- April 8: Mexico issues a 100-year bond for 1.5 billion euros, equivalent to 620 million dollars.

=== May ===
- May 22: Sebastián Lerdo de Tejada Covarrubias dies general director of ISSSTE
- May 27: The SCT opens audits on contracts awarded to OHL
- May 27: Nestora Salgado will be transferred to another prison, that of Tepepan.
- May 28: Murder of coordinator of Panista candidate in the delegation Azcapotzalco.
- May 28: The INE agrees to pay $10,000 to Rigoberta Menchú.
- May 31: Santos champion by defeating the team of Querétaro (5–3).

=== June ===
- June 5: Legislative elections take place to elect the 63rd Congress of the Union.

=== July ===
- July 11: Joaquín "El Chapo" Guzmán, the notorious Mexican drug lord and leader of the Sinaloa Cartel, escaped from the maximum-security Altiplano Federal Prison in Almoloya de Juárez. This was his second escape from a Mexican prison, his first being in 2001.

=== November ===
- November 26 – 2015–2016 Zika virus epidemic: The first three cases of Zika fever are reported in Mexico.

== Awards ==
- Belisario Domínguez Medal of Honor – Alberto Baillères
- Order of the Aztec Eagle
  - King Felipe VI of Spain
  - Charles, Prince of Wales
  - Dilma Rousseff, President of Brazil
- National Prize for Arts and Sciences
- National Public Administration Prize
- Ohtli Award
  - Hector Ruiz
  - John D. Trasviña
  - Valentina Alazraki
  - Suzy Castor
  - Maria Elena Durazo
  - Raúl Grijalva
  - Ana Recio Harvey
  - José Huizar
  - Ray Keck
  - Eva Longoria
  - Spencer MacCallum
  - Antonio Olmos

== Deaths ==
- January 1: Ninón Sevilla, 93, Cuban-born Mexican actress (Aventurera), heart attack.
- January 3: Jaime Romero Móran, 22, gymnast, shot.
- January 7: Julio Scherer García, 88, journalist (Excélsior and Proceso).
- January 25: Demetrio González, 87, Spanish-born Mexican actor (Dos Corazones y un Cielo) and singer, complications from a stroke.
- January 27: Rafael Corrales Ayala, 89, politician, MP for Guanajuato (1949–1952, 1979–1982), Governor of Guanajuato (1985–1991).
- February 7: Gustavo Couttolenc, 93, Mexican translator and academic.
- February 8: Mario Vázquez Raña, businessman (b. 1932)
- February 16: Lorena Rojas, 44, actress.
- February 19: Rafael Orozco, 92, Mexican footballer (Guadalajara).
- February 25: Ariel Camacho, 22, singer, traffic collision.
- March 12: Magda Guzmán, 83, actress, heart attack.
- March 19: Carlos Mijares Bracho, 84, architect
- March 21: Perro Aguayo Jr., 35, professional wrestler (AAA), stroke from vertebral artery dissection.
- March 22: Julieta Marín Torres, 71, politician, MP for Puebla (2009–2012), lung cancer.
- April 3: Rocío García Gaytán, 55, politician, MP (1997–2000), cancer.
- April 10: Raúl Héctor Castro, 98, Mexican-born American politician and diplomat, Governor of Arizona (1975–1977), Ambassador to El Salvador (1964–1968), Bolivia (1968–1969) and Argentina (1977–1980).
- April 13: Joselyn Alejandra Niño, c. 20, suspected assassin, shot.
- April 23
  - Sixto Valencia Burgos, 81, comic artist (Memín Pinguín, MAD).
  - Guillermo Zúñiga Martínez, 72, academic and politician, Mayor of Xalapa (1988–1991), MP for Veracruz (1994–1997).
- April 24: Max Rojas, 74, poet.
- May 1: María Elena Velasco, 74, actress, comedian and film producer (La India María), stomach cancer.
- May 21: Juan Molinar Horcasitas, 59, Mexican politician, ALS.
- June 10: Héctor Pérez Plazola, 81, politician (PAN).
- June 12: Andrés Mora, 60, baseball player (Baltimore Orioles, Cleveland Indians), pneumonia.
- June 21: Juan José Estrada, 51, boxer, WBA bantamweight champion (1988–1989), stabbed.
- June 26: Gustavo Sainz, 74, writer.
- July 2: Jacobo Zabludovsky, 87, Recognized communicator who directed for more than 20 years the main news on national network; stroke. (b. 1928)
- July 13: Joan Sebastian, 64, Popular singer and composer from Guerrero; bone cancer. (b. 1951)
- July 21: Gelsen Gas, 82, artist and filmmaker.
- July 31: Rubén Espinosa, 31, photographer and journalist. murdered.
- August 15: Manuel Mendívil, 79, equestrian, Olympic medalist (1980).
- August 16: Jacob Bekenstein, 68, Mexican-born Israeli-American theoretical physicist.
- August 23
  - Ricardo García Sainz, 85, administrator and politician, Federal deputy (1997–2000).
  - Eugenio Méndez Docurro, 92, politician and engineer, Secretary of Communications and Transportation (1970–1976).
- September 7: Sigifredo Nájera Talamantes, drug cartel leader (Los Zetas), heart attack.
- September 17: Eraclio Zepeda, 78, author and politician.
- September 19: Enrique Ballesté, 68, theater director.
- September 25: Hugo Gutiérrez Vega, 81, poet, diplomat and academic, Ambassador to Greece (1987–1994).
- October 9: Blanca Magrassi Scagno, 92, women's rights activist.
- October 11: Dominga Velasco, 114, Mexican-born American supercentenarian, oldest-ever verified Mexican-born person.
- October 14: José Luis García, 91, baseball player and manager (Tigres de Quintana Roo).
- October 22: Tomás Torres Mercado, 54, politician, member of the Senate (2006–2012), plane crash.
- November 6: José Ángel Espinoza, 96, singer, composer and actor.
- November 12: José Refugio Esparza Reyes, 94, politician, Governor of Aguascalientes (1974–1980).
- November 21: Germán Robles, 86, Spanish-Mexican actor.
- December 1: Xavier Olea Muñoz, 92, diplomat, lawyer and politician; Governor of Guerrero (1975)
- December 4: Ricardo Guízar Díaz, 82, Roman Catholic prelate, Archbishop of Tlalnepantla (1996–2009).
- December 16: Lizmark, 64, professional wrestler, respiratory failure.
- December 24: Romeo Anaya, 69, boxer, WBA Bantamweight Champion (1973).

== See also ==
- List of Mexican films of 2015
