= 2014 in Mexico =

- Decades: 1990s; 2000s; 2010s; 2020s
- See also: History of Mexico; List of years in Mexico; Timeline of Mexican history

This is a list of events that happened in 2014 in Mexico. The article also lists the most important political leaders during the year at both federal and state levels.

== Incumbents ==
=== Federal government ===
- President: Enrique Peña Nieto PRI
- Interior Secretary (SEGOB): Miguel Ángel Osorio Chong
- Secretary of Foreign Affairs (SRE): José Antonio Meade
- Communications Secretary (SCT): Gerardo Ruiz Esparza
- Education Secretary (SEP): Emilio Chuayffet
- Secretary of Defense (SEDENA): Salvador Cienfuegos Zepeda
- Secretary of Navy (SEMAR): Vidal Francisco Soberón Sanz
- Secretary of Labor and Social Welfare (STPS): Alfonso Navarrete Prida
- Secretary of Welfare (BIENESTAR): Rosario Robles
- Tourism Secretary (SECTUR): Claudia Ruiz Massieu
- Secretary of the Environment (SEMARNAT): Juan José Guerra Abud
- Secretary of Health (SALUD): Mercedes Juan López
- Secretary of Finance and Public Credit, (SHCP): Luis Videgaray Caso

=== Governors ===
- Aguascalientes: Carlos Lozano de la Torre, PRI
- Baja California: Francisco Vega de Lamadrid PAN
- Baja California Sur: Marcos Covarrubias Villaseñor PAN
- Campeche: Fernando Ortega Bernés, PAN
- Chiapas: Manuel Velasco Coello PVEM
- Chihuahua: César Duarte Jáquez PRI
- Coahuila: Rubén Moreira Valdez PRI
- Colima: Mario Anguiano Moreno PRI
- Durango: Jorge Herrera Caldera PRI
- Guanajuato: Miguel Márquez Márquez PAN
- Guerrero
  - Ángel Aguirre Rivero PRD, until October 23 (Note: Governor Aguirre Rivero resigned after allegations of his involvement in the 2014 Iguala mass kidnapping.)
  - Rogelio Ortega Martínez, Interim governor starting October 27
- Hidalgo: Francisco Olvera Ruiz PRI
- Jalisco: Aristóteles Sandoval PRI
- State of Mexico: Eruviel Ávila Villegas PRI
- Michoacán
  - Fausto Vallejo PRI, until June 19 (Note: Governor Vallejo resigned for health reasons after his son was accused of having ties to drug dealers.)
  - Salvador Jara Guerrero, Substitute starting June 20
- Morelos: Graco Ramírez PRD.
- Nayarit: Roberto Sandoval Castañeda PRI
- Nuevo León: Rodrigo Medina de la Cruz PRI
- Oaxaca: Gabino Cué Monteagudo MC
- Puebla: Rafael Moreno Valle Rosas PAN
- Querétaro: José Calzada PRI
- Quintana Roo: Roberto Borge Angulo PRI
- San Luis Potosí: Fernando Toranzo Fernández PRI
- Sinaloa: Mario López Valdez PAN
- Sonora: Guillermo Padrés Elías PAN
- Tabasco: Eruviel Ávila Villegas PRD
- Tamaulipas: Egidio Torre Cantú PRI
- Tlaxcala: Mariano González Zarur PRI
- Veracruz: Javier Duarte de Ochoa PRI
- Yucatán: Rolando Zapata Bello PRI
- Zacatecas: Miguel Alonso Reyes PRI
- Head of Government of the Federal District: Miguel Ángel Mancera PRD

== Events ==
=== February ===
- February 22 – Alpine skier Hubertus von Hohenlohe-Langenburg sets the record for the longest span of competing at the Winter Olympic Games, at 30 years.

=== March ===
- March 2–9 – The 2014 Pan American Ice Hockey Tournament take place in Mexico City.

=== April ===
- April 13 – 36 people are killed after the bus in which they were travelling crashed in Acayucan, Veracruz.
- April 18 – A 7.5-magnitude earthquake hits near Petatlán, Guerrero.

=== May ===
- May 12 – Galindo Mellado Cruz, one of the founding members of the Mexican drug cartel Los Zetas, and four other armed men are killed in a shootout with Mexican security forces after they raided Cruz's hideout in the city of Reynosa.

=== August ===
- 27 August–September: CENAPRED reported explosions of Popocateptl, accompanied by steam-and-gas emissions with minor ash and ash plumes that rose 800-3,000 m above the volcano's crater, which drifted west, southwest, and west-southwest. On most nights incandescence was observed, increasing during times with larger emissions.
- 29 and 31 August 2014: The Washington Volcanic Ash Advisory Center (VAAC) reported discrete ash emissions from Popocateptl.

=== September ===
- September 2 – Plans for a new Mexico City international airport are announced at the President's State of the Union Address.
- September 14 – Hurricane Odile reaches Category 4 strength as it nears Mexico's Baja California coast.
- September 19 – The biographical film Cantinflas, about the Mexican actor of the same name, is released in Mexico.
- September 26 – 6 students from the Raúl Isidro Burgos Rural Teachers College of Ayotzinapa are killed and 43 more disappear after a protest and a confrontation with Iguala, Guerrero police officers.

=== October ===
- October 4 – A mass grave is found outside Iguala, Guerrero, southern Mexico, during the search of the students from Raúl Isidro Burgos Rural Teachers College of Ayotzinapa.
- October 25 – Nuestra Belleza México 2014 takes place.

=== November ===
- November 4 – Mexican Federal Police arrest a mayor and his wife, the alleged masterminds of the kidnapping of 43 students in Iguala, Guerrero.
- November 7 – Parents of Mexico's missing students say authorities found 6 bags containing unidentified corpses; investigations are underway to determine if they are of the missing students. Three people confess their involvement in the massacre.
- November 11 – A mob angry at the kidnapping and murder of 43 students torches the regional headquarters of Mexico's ruling Institutional Revolutionary Party (PRI) in Chilpancingo, Guerrero, and briefly holds a police commander hostage.
- November 12 – Protesters attack the State Congress building in Guerrero setting alight five vehicles.
- November 17 – Former Beltrán Leyva Cartel leader Alfredo Beltrán Leyva is extradited to the United States from Mexico, facing drug trafficking and money laundering offences.
- November 20 – Thousands of protestors gather in Mexico City for a national rally in memory of the 43 missing students. Demonstrators have also called for a nationwide strike.
- November 26 – Mexico's Party of the Democratic Revolution PRD founder Cuauhtémoc Cárdenas resigns amid internal political crisis resulting from the disappearance of the 43 students in September.

=== December ===
- December 2 – The number of Chikungunya cases in Chiapas increases from 14 to 39 in one week. Between 17,000 and 18,000 cases have been reported by the Pan American Health Organization.

== Awards ==
- Belisario Domínguez Medal of Honor – Eraclio Zepeda
- Order of the Aztec Eagle
  - José Mujica, President of Uruguay
- National Public Administration Prize
- Ohtli Award
  - Bismarck Lepe
  - Hispanic Heritage Foundation
  - Denise Moreno Ducheny
  - Alma Flor Ada
  - Fernando Valenzuela
  - Jonathan Rothschild
- National Prize for Arts and Sciences
  - Linguistics and literature – María de los Dolores Castro Varela and Eraclio Zepeda Ramos
  - Physics, Mathematics, and Natural Sciences – Carlos Federico Arias Ortiz and Mauricio Hernández Ávila
  - History, Social Sciences, and Philosophy – Néstor García Canclini and Enrique Semo Calev
  - Technology and Design – José Mauricio López Romero
  - Popular Arts and Traditions – Carlomagno Pedro Martínez and Alberto Vargas Castellano
  - Fine arts – Arnaldo José Coen Ávila

== Deaths ==
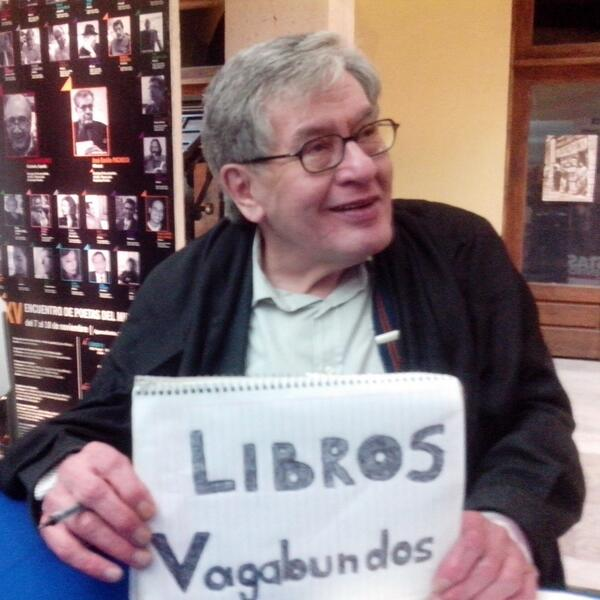
José Emilio Pacheco.

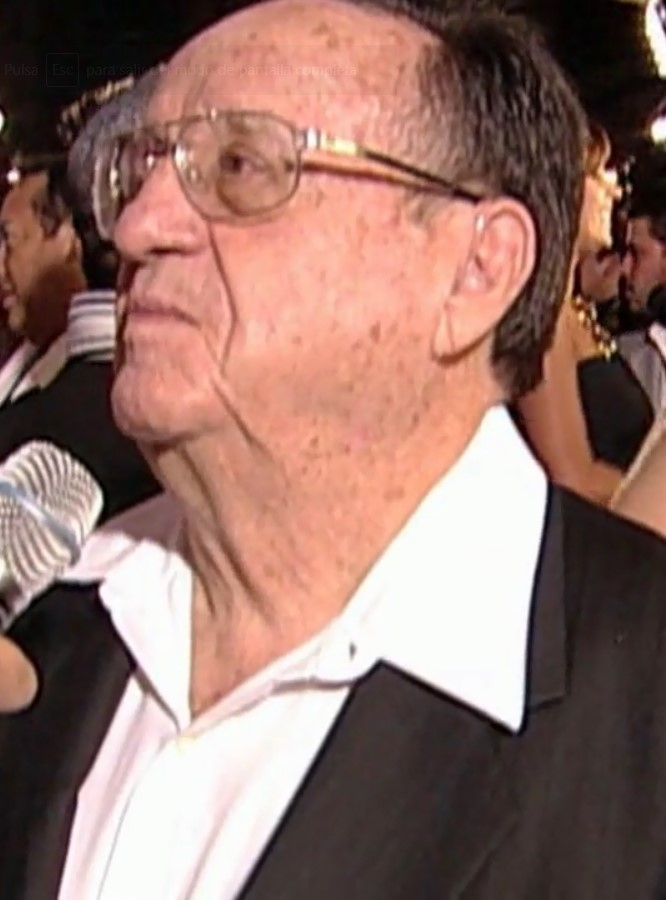
Chespirito.

- January 23 – Miguel Ángel Guzmán Garduño, journalist (Vértice) in Chilpancingo, Guerrero; killed.
- January 26 – José Emilio Pacheco, notable writer.
- February 5 – Gregorio Jiménez de la Cruz, journalist (Notisur & Liberal del Sur) in Coatzacoalcos, Veracruz; killed.
- February 16 – Omar Reyes Fabiánjournalist (Oaxaca Tiempo) in Miahuatlán de Porfirio Díaz, Oaxaca; killed.
- February 28 – Benjamín Galván Gómez, journalist (Última Hora & Primera Hora) in Nuevo Laredo, Tamaulipas; killed.
- March 19 — Esteban Reyes, tennis player.
- June 2 – Jorge Torres Palacios, journalist (El Dictamen de Guerrero) in Acapulco, Guerrero; killed.
- July 14 – Antonio Riva Palacio, politician PRI, Governor of Morelos (1988-1994), Ambassador to Ecuador (b. 1926)
- July 30 – Nolberto Herrera Rodríguez, journalist (Canal 9) in Guadalupe, Zacatecas; killed.
- August 12 – Murder of Octavio Rojas Hernández: Journalist (El Buen Tono) in Cosolapa Oaxaca; killed.
- August 21 – Marlén Valdez García, journalist (La Última Palabra) in Juárez, Nuevo León; killed.
- August 27 – Adrián Gaona Belmonte, journalist (La Comadrita 97.3 FM Radio) in Reynosa, Tamaulipas; killed.
- September 3 – Víctor Pérez Pérez, journalist (Sucesos) in Ciudad Juárez, Chihuahua; killed.
- October 12 – Octavio Atilano Román Tirado, journalist (ABC Radio) in Mazatlán, Sinaloa; killed.
- September 23 (approx.) – Gabriel Gómez Michel, politician PRI, Deputy of the LXII Legislature of the Mexican Congress from Zacatecas.
- October 16 – María del Rosario Fuentes Rubio, journalist (Valor por Tamaulipas) in Reynosa, Tamaulipas; killed.
- October 22 – Jesús Antonio Gamboa Urías, journalist (Nueva Prensa) in Los Mochis, Sinaloa; killed.
- November 28 – Chespirito "Roberto Gómez Bolaños", actor and writer.
- December 15 — Fausto Zapata, lawyer, politician PRI, diplomat, Governor of San Luis Potosí in 1991
- December 22 – Carmencita Pernett, Colombian singer.

== See also ==
- List of Mexican films of 2014
