= 2013 in Mexico =

- Decades: 1990s; 2000s; 2010s; 2020s
- See also: History of Mexico; List of years in Mexico; Timeline of Mexican history

This is a list of events that happened in 2013 in Mexico. The article also lists the most important political leaders during the year at both federal and state levels.

== Incumbents ==
=== Federal government ===
President: Enrique Peña Nieto PRI

- Interior Secretary (SEGOB): Miguel Ángel Osorio Chong
- Secretary of Foreign Affairs (SRE): José Antonio Meade
- Secretariat of Agriculture and Rural Development (SEGARPA): Enrique Martínez y Martínez
- Secretary of Agricultural, Territorial and Urban Development (SEDATU): Jorge Carlos Ramírez Marín
- Communications Secretary (SCT): Gerardo Ruiz Esparza
- Education Secretary (SEP): Emilio Chuayffet Chemor
- Secretary of Defense (SEDENA): Salvador Cienfuegos Cepeda
- Secretary of Navy (SEMAR): Vidal Francisco Soberón Sanz
- Secretary of Labor and Social Welfare: Alfonso Navarrete Prida
- Secretary of Welfare (SEDESOL): Rosario Robles
- Tourism Secretary (SECTUR): Claudia Ruiz Massieu
- Secretary of the Environment (SEMARNAT): Juan José Guerra Abud
- Secretary of Health (SALUD): Mercedes Juan López
- Secretary of Finance and Public Credit (SHCP): Luis Videgaray Caso
- Secretary of Economy (SE): Idelfonso Guajardo
- Secretary of Energy (SENER): Pedro Joaquín Coldwell
  - Comisión Federal de Electricidad (CFE): Francisco Rojas Gutiérrez
  - Pemex: Emilio Lozoya
- Attorney General (FGR): Jesús Murillo Karam
- Chief of Staff: Aurelio Nuño Mayer
- Coordinación de Comunicación Social de Presidencia (Coordination of Social Communication of the Presidency): David López Gutiérrez
- Estado Mayor Presidencial (Presidential Security Staff): Rodolfo Miranda Moreno

=== Governors ===
- Aguascalientes: Carlos Lozano de la Torre PRI
- Baja California
  - José Guadalupe Osuna Millán PAN, until October 31.
  - Francisco Vega de Lamadrid PAN, starting November 1.
- Baja California Sur: Marcos Covarrubias Villaseñor PAN
- Campeche: Fernando Ortega Bernés PRI
- Chiapas: Manuel Velasco Coello PVEM
- Chihuahua: César Duarte Jáquez PRI
- Coahuila: Rubén Moreira Valdez PRI
- Colima: Mario Anguiano Moreno PRI
- Durango: Jorge Herrera Caldera PRI
- Guanajuato: Miguel Márquez Márquez PAN
- Guerrero: Ángel Aguirre Rivero PRD
- Hidalgo: Francisco Olvera Ruiz PRI
- Jalisco
  - Emilio González Márquez PAN, until February 28
  - Aristóteles Sandoval PRI, starting March 1
- State of Mexico: Eruviel Ávila Villegas PRI
- Michoacán
  - Fausto Vallejo PRI, until March 7 and from October 21 (Note: Governor Vallejo stepped down temporarily for health reasons.)
  - Jesús Reyna García, Interim governor from March 7 to October 21
- Morelos: Graco Ramírez PRD.
- Nayarit: Roberto Sandoval Castañeda PRI
- Nuevo León: Rodrigo Medina de la Cruz PRI
- Oaxaca: Gabino Cué Monteagudo MC
- Puebla: Rafael Moreno Valle Rosas PAN
- Querétaro: José Eduardo Calzada Rovirosa PRI
- Quintana Roo: Roberto Borge Angulo PRI
- San Luis Potosí: Fernando Toranzo Fernández PRI
- Sinaloa: Mario López Valdez PAN
- Sonora: Guillermo Padrés Elías PAN
- Tabasco: Arturo Núñez Jiménez PRD, starting January 1
- Tamaulipas: Egidio Torre Cantú PRI
- Tlaxcala: Mariano González Zarur PRI
- Veracruz: Javier Duarte de Ochoa PRI
- Yucatán: Rolando Zapata Bello PRI
- Zacatecas: Miguel Alonso Reyes PRI
- Head of Government of the Federal District: Miguel Ángel Mancera PRD

== Events ==
- January
  - Clausura 2013 Copa MX (through April)
  - 1 – New Year's Day, civic holiday, Minimum wage increase of 3.9% (MXN $2.04)
  - 31 – Torre Ejecutiva Pemex explosion: Thirty-seven killed and 126 injured, followed by three days of mourning.
- February
  - 20 – 5.6 magnitude earthquake centered in Armería, Colima. No reported damages or injuries.
  - National Institute of Statistics and Geography (INEGI) publishes figures indicating 3.9% economic growth during 2012 but warns of a possible deceleration of the economy in 2013.
- March
  - 2013 Rally México
  - 8 – Bank of Mexico (Banixco) cuts prime interest rates to 4.50%.
  - 26 – Satmex 8 launched.
  - 28 – First same-sex marriage performed in Oaxaca
- April 21 – 5.8 magnitude earthquake centered in Michoacan causes blackouts in Mexico City but no reported injuries or other damages.
- May
  - 2 – United States President Barack Obama makes an official trip to Mexico.
  - 7 – the 2013 Ecatepec de Morelos gas tanker explosion: Twenty-seven killed and at least 30 injured.
  - 8 – The value of the peso increases and Mexico's Fitch Ratings increase from BBB to BBB+.
  - 26 – Club America wins the 2012–13 Liga MX season.
- June – Chactún, a Mayan ruin, is discovered in Campeche
- July
  - 7 – Elections in seven states.
  - 23 – Chihuahua International Airport is closed because of flooding due to heavy rains.
  - Hurricane Erick strikes Southwestern Mexico, Western Mexico and Baja California Sur
  - 2013 Central American and Caribbean Championships in Athletics: Mexican men win 23 medals, women win 24.
  - 2013 World Taekwondo Championships in Puebla: Mexico wins five medals. The men's team is ranked third and the women's is ranked ninth.
- August
  - 25 – the 2013 Tabasco train derailment, at least five killed, at least 22 injured, mostly undocumented immigrants
  - 31 – Miss Latin America 2013 in the Riviera Maya won by Julia Guerra of Brasil. Mexico's Fanny Barroso finishes third.
  - 2013 Copa de México de Naciones in Aztec Stadium won by Argentina.
  - Hurricane Manuel strikes much of Mexico
- September
  - 2 – President Peña gives his first annual message.**Hurricane Ingrid strikes
  - Banixco cuts its prime rate to 3.75%.
- October
  - 5 – Chihuahua monster truck accident
  - 19 – Nuestra Belleza México 2013, won by Josselyn Garciglia from Baja California Sur.
  - Hurricane Raymond strikes the southwestern coast
- November
  - INEGI reports economic growth between 0.8% and 1.3% during the third trimester, avoiding recession.
  - Museo Jumex opens
- December
  - 19 – S&P Global Ratings increases Mexico credit rating to BBB+.
  - 20 – The Senate approves partial privatization of the oil industry.

=== Anticipated ===
The SEGH-CFE 1 solar power array was expected to go online in 2013.

== Awards ==
- National Prize for Arts and Sciences
  - Physics, Mathematics, and Natural Sciences – Federico Bermúdez Rattoni, Magdaleno Medina Noyola
  - Technology and Design – Martín Ramón Aluja Schuneman Hofer
  - Fine arts – Javier Álvarez (composer), Ángela Gurría, Paul Leduc (film director)
  - Linguistics and literature – Hugo Gutiérrez Vega, Luis Fernando Lara Ramos
  - History, Social Sciences, and Philosophy – Roger Bartra, Carlos Martínez Assad
  - Popular Arts and Traditions – Narciso Lico Carrillo
- Belisario Domínguez Medal of Honor – Manuel Gómez Morín (post mortem)
- Order of the Aztec Eagle – Takashi Yamanouchi, Japanese businessperson
- Ohtli Award
  - Alberto M. Carvalho
  - Henry Cisneros
  - Jesús "Chuy" García
  - Lincoln Díaz-Balart
  - José M. Hernández

== Notable deaths ==
- January 8 – Raúl Araiza, 77, actor, director, and producer (b. 1935)
- January 31 – Rubén Bonifaz Nuño
- February 19 – Joaquín Cordero
- February 21 — Francisco José Madero González, accountant and politician (PRI); Governor of Coahuila in 1981
- March 3 – Jaime Guadalupe González Domínguez
- May 10 – Félix Agramont Cota, Mexican engineer and politician, 8th Governor of Baja California Sur (b. 1918)
- May 26 – Héctor Garza
- July 17 – Alberto López Bello
- September 18 – Rafael Corkidi
- October 15 – El Brazo (Juan Alvarado Nieves)
- October 18 – Francisco Rafael Arellano Félix
- November 15 – Karla Álvarez
- December 11 – Javier Jauregui

== See also ==
- List of Mexican films of 2013
