= 2016 in Mexico =

- Decades: 1990s; 2000s; 2010s; 2020s
- See also: History of Mexico; List of years in Mexico; Timeline of Mexican history

This is a list of events that happened in 2016 in Mexico. The article also lists the most important political leaders during the year at both federal and state levels.

== Incumbents ==
=== Federal government ===
- President: Enrique Peña Nieto PRI
- Interior Secretary (SEGOB): Miguel Ángel Osorio Chong
- Secretary of Foreign Affairs (SRE): Claudia Ruiz Massieu
- Communications Secretary (SCT): Gerardo Ruiz Esparza
- Education Secretary (SEP): Aurelio Nuño Mayer
- Secretary of Defense (SEDENA): Salvador Cienfuegos Zepeda
- Secretary of Navy (SEMAR): Vidal Francisco Soberón Sanz
- Secretary of Labor and Social Welfare (STPS): Alfonso Navarrete Prida
- Secretary of Welfare (BIENESTAR)
  - José Antonio Meade, until September 6
  - Luis Enrique Miranda Nava, starting September 7
- Tourism Secretary (SECTUR): Enrique de la Madrid Cordero
- Secretary of the Environment (SEMARNAT): Rafael Pacchiano Alamán
- Secretary of Health (SALUD)
  - Mercedes Juan López, until February 8
  - José Narro Robles, starting February 8
- Secretary of Finance and Public Credit, (SHCP)
  - Luis Videgaray Caso, until September 7
  - José Antonio Meade, starting September 7

=== Governors ===
- Aguascalientes
  - Carlos Lozano de la Torre PRI, until November 30
  - Martín Orozco Sandoval PAN, starting December 1.
- Baja California: Francisco Vega de Lamadrid PAN
- Baja California Sur: Carlos Mendoza Davis PAN
- Campeche: Alejandro Moreno Cárdenas PRI
- Chiapas: Manuel Velasco Coello PVEM
- Chihuahua
  - César Horacio Duarte Jáquez PRI, until October 4
  - Javier Corral Jurado PAN, starting October 4
- Coahuila: Rubén Moreira Valdez PRI
- Colima: Mario Anguiano Moreno PRI
- Durango
  - Jorge Herrera Caldera PAN, until September 14
  - José Rosas Aispuro PAN, starting September 15
- Guanajuato: Miguel Márquez Márquez PAN
- Guerrero: Héctor Astudillo Flores, PRI
- Hidalgo
  - Francisco Olvera Ruiz PRI, until September 5
  - Omar Fayad PAN starting September 5
- Jalisco: Aristóteles Sandoval PRI
- Mexico (state): Eruviel Ávila Villegas PRI
- Michoacán: Silvano Aureoles Conejo PRD
- Morelos: Graco Ramírez PRD.
- Nayarit: Roberto Sandoval Castañeda PRI
- Nuevo León: Jaime Rodríguez Calderón ("El Bronco,"), Independent.
- Oaxaca
  - Gabino Cué Monteagudo MC until November 30
  - Alejandro Murat Hinojosa (PRI), starting December 1.
- Puebla: Rafael Moreno Valle Rosas PAN
- Querétaro: José Calzada PRI
- Quintana Roo
  - Roberto Borge Angulo PRI, until September 25
  - Carlos Joaquín González PAN, starting September 25.
- San Luis Potosí: Juan Manuel Carreras PRI
- Sinaloa: Mario López Valdez ("Malova") PAN, until December 31
- Sonora: Claudia Pavlovich Arellano PRI
- Tabasco: Arturo Núñez Jiménez, PRD
- Tamaulipas
  - Egidio Torre Cantú PRI, until October 1
  - Francisco Javier García Cabeza de Vaca, PAN, starting October 1.
- Tlaxcala: Mariano González Zarur PRI
- Veracruz
  - Javier Duarte de Ochoa PRI, until October 12
  - Flavino Ríos Alvarado, Interim governor October 12 – December 1.
  - Miguel Ángel Yunes Linares PAN, starting December 1
- Yucatán: Rolando Zapata Bello PRI
- Zacatecas
  - Miguel Alonso Reyes PRI, until September 11
  - Alejandro Tello Cristerna PRI, starting September 12
- Head of Government of the Federal District: Miguel Ángel Mancera, Independent

== Events ==
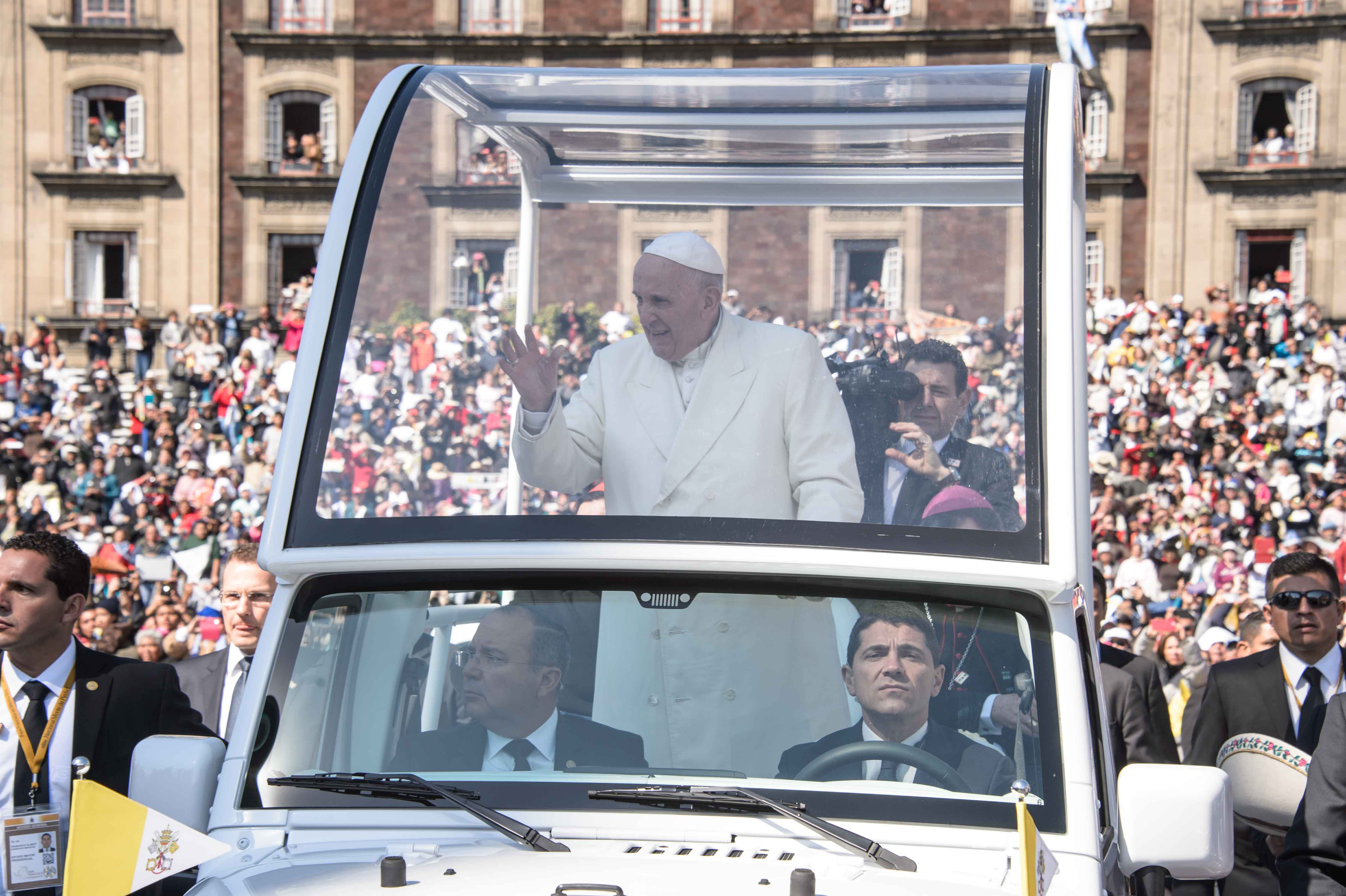
Visit of Pope Francis to Mexico. February 12–17, 2016

=== January and February ===
- January 2 – Gunmen shoot and kill Temixco mayor Gisela Mota Ocampo at her home, the day after she was elected. Police shoot and kill several suspects and arrest several more who are suspected of involvement in organized crime.
- January 8 – Mexican police arrest Sinaloa Cartel leader Joaquín Guzmán on January 8. He had been on the run since his second escape from prison in July 2015.
- January 20 – The Federal District is dissolved, and it officially becomes the "Ciudad de México". The political reform gives the city self-rule.
- January 28 – 2015–2016 Zika virus epidemic: The World Health Organization (WHO) warns that the Zika virus is "spreading explosively" in the Americas.
- February 11 – Forty-nine killed and 12 injured during a riot at the Topo Chopo prison in Nuevo León.
- February 12 to 17 – Pope Francis visits Mexico.
- February 29 to March 6 – 2016 Monterrey Open

=== March and April ===
- March 28, 2016: An ash column 2,000 metres (6,600 ft) high was released from Popocateptl, prompting the establishment of a 12-kilometer "security ring" around the summit.
- April 3, 2016 — Popocatépetl erupted, spewing lava, ash and rock.
- April 9 to 15 – 2016 IIHF World Championship Division II Group B in Mexico City
- April 14 to 17 – Equestrian jumping show at Campo Marte in Mexico City.
- April 16 — Javier Duarte de Ochoa, former Governor of Veracruz (PRI) 2010–2016 is arrested and charged with corruption.
- April 20 — At least 24 people were killed, 136 others injured, following a blast at the major Clorados 3 petrochemical plant of Petroquimica Mexicana de Vinilo. The plant is run by Mexichem under agreement with Petroleos Mexicanos (Pemex), the national petrochemical company, in Coatzacoalcos, Veracruz, Mexico, on the country's southern Gulf of Mexico coast. Pemex had an earlier fire at the same facility in February 2016 that killed one worker; also that month, an offshore Pemex Gulf platform fire killed two and injured eight.

=== May and June ===
- May 17 – President Peña Nieto signs legislation legalizing Same-sex marriage.
- June 1 – A riot at the penitentiary Topo Chico in Monterrey, Nuevo León, leaves three inmates killed and 14 injured.
- June 3 – Auguste Rodin´s "The Gates of Hell" ((in French) Les Portes de l’Enfer) is displayed at the Museo Soumaya in Mexico City.
- June 5 – Elections in 13 states.

=== July and August ===
- July 17 – Revillagigedo Islands are declared a World Heritage Site by UNESCO.
- July 8 – President Peña asks for forgiveness for the "Casa Blanca" scandal that came to light in 2014.
- July 23 – Municipal presidents of Chamula, Chiapas, and Pungarabato, Guerro, are assassinated.
- August 2016 – Eruptions continued from Popocateptl, with four discrete blasts on August 17.
- August 1 – Municipal president of Huehuetlán el Grande, Puebla, is assassinated.

=== September and October ===
- September 22 – Eugenio Andrés Lira Rugarcía is named bishop of the Roman Catholic Diocese of Matamoros.
- October 4 – The cable line Mexicable opens to facilitate transportation in the Sierra de Guadalupe in Ecatepec de Morelos.
- October 12 – Veracruz Governor Javier Duarte de Ochoa is forced to resign after being accused of corruption and illegal enrichment; Flavino Ríos Álvaro become Interim governor.

=== November and December ===
- November 10: Guillermo Padrés Elías, former Governor of Sonora (PAN) 2009–2015 is arrested for allegedly laundering US$8.9 million.
- December 20 – 2016 San Pablito Market fireworks explosion: An explosion at a fireworks factory in Tultepec, State of Mexico, leaves at least 42 people killed and dozens injured.

== Awards ==
- Belisario Domínguez Medal of Honor – Gonzalo Rivas (post mortem)
- Order of the Aztec Eagle
  - Frederik, Crown Prince of Denmark
  - Sabah Al-Ahmad Al-Jaber Al-Sabah, Emir of Kuwait
  - King Salman of Saudi Arabia
  - President Mauricio Macri of Argentina
  - President Sergio Mattarella of Italy
- National Prize for Arts and Sciences
- National Public Administration Prize
- Ohtli Award
  - Teresa Alonso-Rasgado
  - Julian Castro
  - L. Whitney Clayton
  - Carlos del Rio
  - Josefina Villamil Tinajero
  - Gabriela Teissier

== Holidays and observances ==
- January 1 – New Year's Day, statutory holiday
- January 6 – Feast of the Epiphany
- February 1 – Constitution Day, statutory holiday
- February 2 – Feast of Candlemas
- February 10 – Ash Wednesday
- February 14 – Day of Love and Friendship
- February 20 – Mexican Army Day, civic holiday
- February 24 – Flag Day, civic holiday
- March 8 – International Women's Day
- March 18 – Anniversary of the Mexican oil expropriation, civic holiday
- March 21 – Benito Juárez's Birthday, statutory holiday
- March 19 – March equinox
- March 20 to 26 – Holy Week
- March 24 – Holy Thursday
- March 25 – Good Friday
- April 21 – Heroic Defense of Veracruz, civic holiday
- April 30 – Children's Day
- May 1 – Labour Day, statutory holiday
- May 5 – Cinco de Mayo, civic holiday
- May 8 – Miguel Hidalgo y Costilla's Birthday, civic holiday
- May 10 – Mother's Day
- May 15
  - Pentecost
  - Teachers' Day
- May 23 – Students' Day
- May 26 – Feast of Corpus Christi
- June 1 – Mexican Navy Day, civic holiday
- June 19 – Father's Day
- June 20 – June solstice
- September 13 – Anniversary of the "Heroic Cadets", civic holiday
- September 15 – Cry of Dolores, civic holiday
- September 16 – Independence Day, statutory holiday
- September 30 – José María Morelos's Birthday, civic holiday
- October 12 – Day of the Race, civic holiday
- November 1 – All Saints' Day
- November 2 – Day of the Dead
- November 20 – Feast of Christ the King
- November 21 – Revolution Day, statutory holiday
- December 12 – Feast of Our Lady of Guadalupe
- December 16 to 24 – Las Posadas
- December 21 – December solstice
- December 24 – Christmas Eve
- December 25 – Christmas Day, statutory holiday

== Deaths ==
- January 2: Gisela Mota Ocampo, Presidente Municipal of Temixco, Morelos (b. 1982)
- January 7
  - Joaquín Gamboa Pascoe. Politician and union leader.
  - Jesús María Ramón Valdés, politician.
- January 17: Juan Manuel Ley, businessman (Casa Ley).
- January 23: Espectrito, professional wrestler (WWE, AAA).
- February 1: Miguel Gutiérrez, soccer player (Club Atlas).
- February 12: Braulio Manuel Fernández, 74, politician.
- February 13: Rafael Moreno Valle, soldier (general), physician, and politician (PRI), Governor of Puebla (1969–1972), Secretary of Health (1964–1968).
- February 15 – Carlos Quintero Arce, 96, Mexican Roman Catholic prelate, Archbishop of Hermosillo (1968–1996).
- February 17 – Jesús Barrero, 57, actor and voice actor (Saint Seiya).
- February 20 – Moisés Dagdug Lützow, 65, radio-station owner (XEVX-am), politician (PRD), Deputy from Villahermosa, Tabasco (2006–2009) stabbed.
- February 21 – María Luisa Alcalá, 72, actress (El Chavo del Ocho, Dr. Cándido Pérez, Esmeralda).
- March 14 – Mónica Arriola Gordillo, 44, Mexican politician (New Alliance Party, member of the Chamber of Deputies (2006–2009), cancer.
- March 17 – Eliezer Ronen, 84, Mexican-born Israeli politician, member of the Knesset (1974–1977).
- March 23 – Fernando Solana, 85, Mexican diplomat and politician, member of the Senate for Mexico City (1994–2000), Secretary of Foreign Affairs (1988–1993), negotiated NAFTA.
- March 26
  - Raúl Cárdenas, 86, soccer player (Zacatepec) and coach (Cruz Azul, national team).
  - Francisco García Moreno, a member of the 1968, 1972, and 1976 Olympic water polo teams was shot near his home in Cuernavaca during a robbery.
- April 3 – Leopoldo Flores, 82, artist, member of the Salón de la Plástica Mexicana (b. 1934).
- April 9 – Lucas Martínez Lara, 70, prelate, Bishop of Roman Catholic Diocese of Matehuala (2006–2016).
- April 16 – Rubén Mendoza Ayala, 55, Mexican politician (PRD), Deputy (2003–2006) from the State of Mexico; heart attack.
- April 18 – Arnulfo Mejía Rojas, engineer, architect, teacher, historian, painter, artist, and Catholic priest, best known for being the creator of "The Boat of the Faith".
- April 24 – Ricardo Torres Origel, 59, Mexican politician (PAN) Deputy (2000–2003) and Senator (2006–2012) from Guanajuato (b. September 8, 1956).
- April 26 – Álvaro Pérez Treviño, 85, Mexican politician (Authentic Party of the Mexican Revolution) (b. May 8, 1930).
- May 8 – Tonita Castro, 63, Mexican-born American actress (Dads, Funny People, The Book of Life), stomach cancer; (b. January 8, 1953).
- May 18 – Luis H. Álvarez, 96, President of National Action Party, Municipal president of Chihuahua (1983–1986) (b. October 25, 1919).
- May 22
  - José Luis Romo Martín, 62, Otomi -Hñäñhü- artist (b. April 19, 1954).
  - Leonorilda Ochoa, 76, actress (Los Beverly de Peralvillo), Alzheimer's disease (b. October 30, 1937).
- June 17 – Rubén Aguirre, 82, actor (Profesor Jirafales in El Chavo del Ocho, El Chapulín Colorado, Chespirito), pneumonia (b. June 15, 1934).
- June 20 – Chayito Valdez, 71, Mexican-born American folk singer (Corridos de Caballos) and actress ("Hijos de tigre", "Tierra de Valientes"), complications from a cerebral hemorrhage (b. May 28, 1945).
- July 2 – Flavio Romero de Velasco, 90, lawyer and politician (PRI), Governor of Jalisco (1977–1983) (b. February 22, 1925).
- July 3 – Mauricio Walerstein, 71, film director (Cuando quiero llorar no lloro, Españolas en París).
- July 6 – Armando León Bejarano, surgeon and Governor of Morelos (PRI), 1976–1982 (b. 1916)
- July 7 – Cinna Lomnitz, 90, German-born Chilean-Mexican geophysicist.
- July 17 – Rafael Aguilar Talamantes. Founding politician of the Cardenista Front of National Reconstruction (PFCRN) and Federal Elections of Mexico 1994 presidential candidate in 1994 (b. October 24, 1939).
- July 18 – Aldo Monti, 87, actor (Las momias de Guanajuato, Entre el amor y el odio) (b. January 4, 1929).
- August 6 – José Becerra, 80, bantamweight boxer, world champion (1959–1960) (b. April 15, 1936).
- August 13 – Miguel Bortolini, 74, politician (PRD), President of the Coyoacán (2003—2006); cancer (b. September 29, 1941).
- August 20 – Ignacio Padilla, 47, writer, co-founder of the Crack Movement; traffic collision (b. November 7, 1968).
- August 23 – Evita Muñoz, 79, Mexican actress (Nosotros los Pobres, Mundo de juguete); pneumonia (b. November 26, 1936).
- August 28 – Juan Gabriel, 56, Singer and composer originally from Michoacán, (b. 1950).
- September 16 – Teodoro González de León, 90, Mexican architect (b. May 29, 1926).
- October 4 – Mario Almada, 94, Mexican actor (La Viuda Negra).
- October 7 – Martha Roth, 84, Italian-born Mexican actress (A Family Like Many Others).
- October 9
  - René Avilés Fabila, 75, author (The Games, Tantadel), heart attack (b. November 15, 1940).
  - El Mongol, 86, professional wrestler (GCW).
- October 10 – Gonzalo Vega, 69, actor (Life Is Most Important, The Place Without Limits) (b. November 29, 1946).
- October 24 – Herón Escobar, 62, politician (PT) from Sinaloa, member of Congress (2009–2012).
- October 30 – René Velázquez Valenzuela, suspected hitman, leader of the Sinaloa Cartel, shot.
- November 5
  - Israel Cavazos Garza, 93, historian.
  - Rodolfo Stavenhagen, 84, sociologist.
- November 12 – Lupita Tovar, 106, Mexican-American actress (Drácula, Santa, Miguel Strogoff), heart disease.
- November 17 – Fidel Negrete, 84, Olympic long-distance runner (1964), Pan American gold medalist (1963).
- November 23 – Renato López, 33, actor and television host, shot.

== Film ==
- List of Mexican films of 2016

== See also ==
- Timeline of Mexican history
- Zika virus outbreak timeline
