= Rodolfo Lacy Tamayo =

Mexican politician

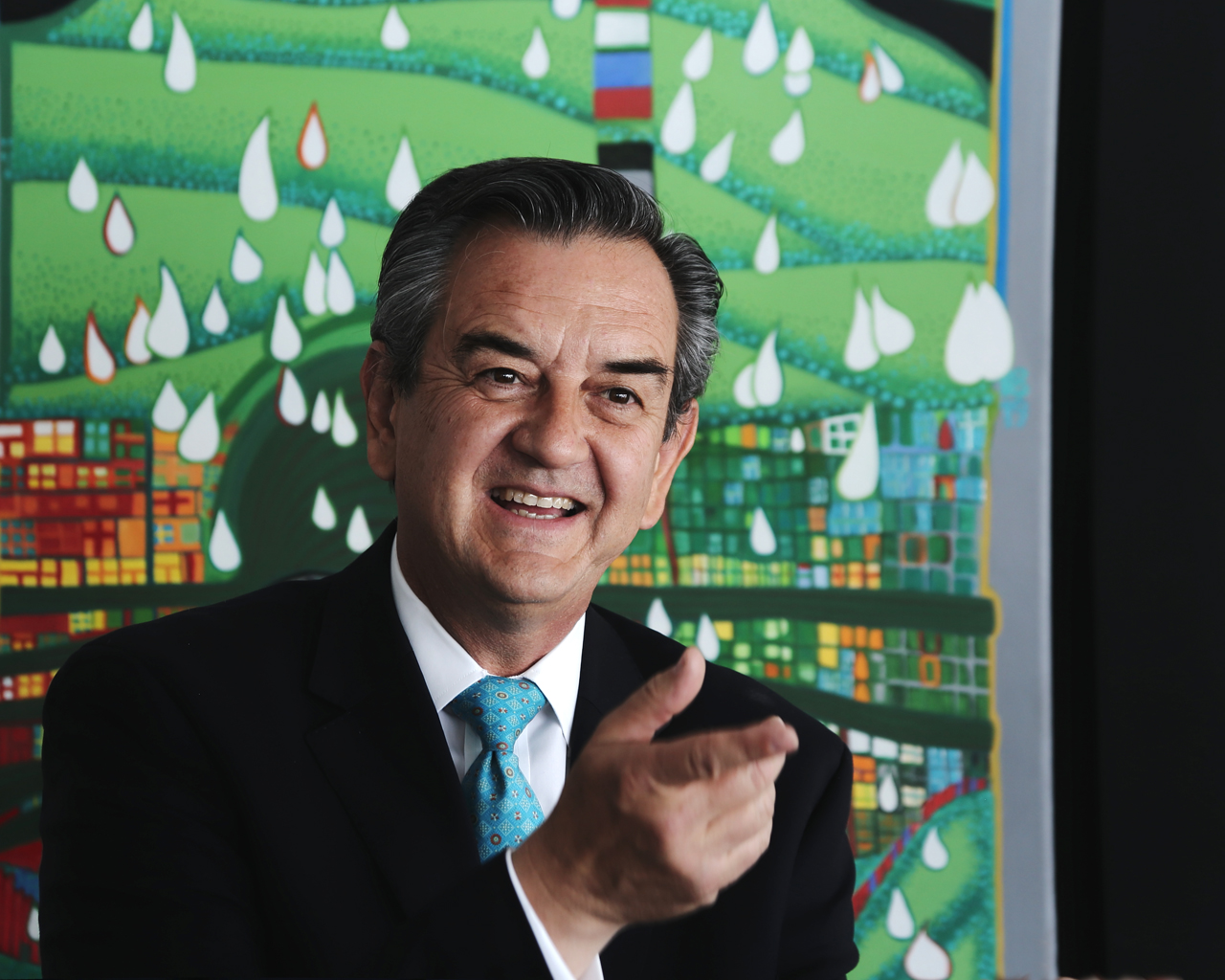
- Born: 22 July 1958 (age 68); Hermosillo, Mexico
- Education: Massachusetts Institute of Technology
- Occupations: Environmental Engineer, politician
- Known for: Director for Climate Action and Environment for Latin America at the OECD

Rodolfo Lacy Tamayo (born 22 July 1958) is an environmental engineer and a civil servant of Mexico. Since April 2022, he was appointed Special Envoy on Climate Matters to the United Nations as Director for Climate Action and Environment for Latin America at the OECD.

Before that he was the Undersecretary of Planning and Environmental Policy in the Ministry of the Environment and Natural Resources (SEMARNAT) and also Director of the Environment Directorate at the Organization for Economic Co-operation and Development OECD.

== Education ==
He studied environmental engineering with a concentration area in Air Pollution Control and Environmental Impact Assessment at the Universidad Autónoma Metropolitana (UAM), Azcapotzalco campus, graduating in 1980; He was member of the Divisional Council in Basic Sciences and Engineering and of the Academic College of that institution, representing the students of engineering. In 1994 received a scholarship from the Rockefeller Foundation to participate in El Colegio de México in the international program Leadership for Environment and Development (LEAD) forming part of the third generation of this program in Mexico. In 2005, he completed master's degrees in Urban Studies and Planning at the Massachusetts Institute of Technology (MIT) in the United States of America presenting his thesis about Carbon Capture and Storage (CCS). Later in March, he graduated as a Doctor of Environmental Science and Engineering from the UAM. Since he was a student he has maintained a trade union between engineers and professionals dedicated to the protection of nature and has participated in environmental engineering associations in Mexico and Latin America.

== Career ==
He has been professor in different academic institutions, independent environmental consultant and public official of the federal government in the environmental sector. During his professional career he has participated in the creation of environmental institutions and regulations of the Mexican State.

In 1979, he began his professional career within the federal government at the Center for Research and Training on Water Quality Control, conducting monitoring and diagnostic activities on the environmental effects of wastewater reuse in Mexico City. Later, he joined the General Directorate of Ecological Development of Human Settlements, in these function, was the technical leader of the first National Ecology Program 1984-1988 as well as coordinator of the first Report on the State of the Environment in Mexico in 1985.

Ten years later, he joined the Mexico City government as Director of studies and environmental projects and later, as Director General of Prevention and Control of Environmental Pollution. Among other activities, it developed and provided technical assistance to the Integral Program against Atmospheric Pollution of the Metropolitan Zone of Mexico City (PICCA and ProAIRE), and the first Air Quality Comprehensive Program and other environmental programs such as reforestation, solid waste management, alternative fuels, Inspection & Maintenance, and the one day without a car ban (Hoy No Circula) program."

In December 2001 he was appointed Coordinator of Advisors to the Secretary of the Environment and Natural Resources, a position from which he promoted the creation of the certification system and information on Clean Beaches, defined the Agenda for the Sea and strategies for promoting Ecotourism, Art and Environment, Holistic Livestock, protection of the Upper Gulf of California, Gulf of Mexico and Protected Natural Areas with presence of indigenous groups.

In December 2012, Rodolfo Lacy was appointed by President Enrique Peña Nieto as Under Secretary of Planning and Environmental Policy at SEMARNAT, initially Secretary in charge of Mr. Juan José Guerra Abud and currently headed by Mr. Rafael Pacchiano Alamán. As an environmental consultant he has worked for the World Bank and Swisscontact in Central America and South America, as well as for several private consulting firms. From 2006 to 2010 he was appointed by the Legislative Assembly of the Federal District as Citizen Advisor to the Environmental and Territorial Ordering Office (PAOT) in Mexico City. From 2008 to 2012 he was Citizen Representative to the North American Commission on Environmental Cooperation (CCA-JPAC).

In August 2018, Lacy took duties as Director of the Environment Directorate, in this he was responsible for advancing the 21 x 21 Agenda and the Strategic Orientations of the Secretary General in ENVS's areas. In April 2022 he was appointed Special Envoy on Climate Matters to the United Nations as Director for Climate Action and Environment for Latin America at the OECD.
