= Murder of Octavio Rojas Hernández =

Mexican journalist murdered in 2014

Octavio Rojas Hernández
- Born: Mexico
- Died: August 11, 2014; San José Cosolapa, Oaxaca, Mexico
- Cause of death: Gunshot wounds
- Occupation: Reporter
- Known for: Victim of unsolved murder

On August 11, 2014, Mexican reporter Octavio Rojas Hernández was murdered at his home in San José Cosolapa, Oaxaca, Mexico. According to police reports, he was lured from his home after an unidentified young man told him he was interested in buying his vehicle. As Rojas chatted with the suspect, he was shot four times and killed. The perpetrator fled from the scene shortly thereafter. Rojas was a reporter for the daily El Buen Tono ("The Good Tone"), where he frequently covered the police section and topics on organized crime. A few days before his murder, Rojas had written an article on the daily's crime section about Mexican security forces discovering a criminal cell that was siphoning gas from Mexico's state-owned oil company Pemex.

== Murder ==
At around 4:00 p.m. on August 11, 2014, a young man came to Octavio Rojas Hernández's door to ask about buying the vehicle that was parked outside his home in San José Cosolapa, Oaxaca, Mexico. Rojas had just arrived at his home following a social event in Palma Sola, Cosolapa, and was about to eat, but left the house to talk with the young man about the vehicle. When Rojas' wife went inside to fetch the car keys, the unidentified man shot Rojas four times: two times in the head, once in his abdomen, and once in his left arm. After hearing the gunshots, his wife ran outside to see what had happened, but the murderer had fled the area.

Neighbors who heard the gunshots stated that the man escaped in a green Chevrolet truck. Soldiers of the Mexican Army and policemen from the municipality and the Oaxaca state department arrived at the scene to investigate the murder and search for the suspect. However, the murderer was not found. Subsequent forensic examination confirmed that Rojas died at the scene from traumatic brain injury. Miguel Ángel Contreras, the director of El Buen Tono, also arrived at the murder scene with a co-worker and a photographer. He stated that when he arrived he saw several suspicious-looking men take pictures of them and write down the plate numbers of his vehicle. "El Negro", as Rojas was known affectionately his friends and family members, was buried at a cemetery in Tezonapa, Veracruz, his hometown. He is survived by his wife and two sons.

== Background and investigation ==
Rojas was a reporter for the Córdoba, Veracruz daily El Buen Tono ("The Good Tone") and frequently wrote on its crime section. He also worked as the communications director for the municipality of San José Cosolapa, Oaxaca. Less than 48 hours before the murder, El Buen Tono had published an article about the Mexican Army and the Oaxaca state authorities seizing three vehicles containing 16,000 litres (4,200 US gal) of stolen fuel. The fuel was allegedly stolen by a criminal cell involved in siphoning gas from Mexico's state-owned oil company Pemex. According to the article, which cited anonymous officials, the vehicles seized were allegedly owned by the Cosolapa police chief Fermín Vanegas Fernández. In the article, Venegas was described as the alleged ring leader in the criminal cell. Weeks prior to this report, Rojas had written other articles criticizing Vanegas and his alleged abuse of his police duties. The reports were published without the author's name for security reasons, but Rojas was the only correspondent for the daily in Cosolapa. With his death, Rojas became the fifth journalist killed in Mexico in 2014.

Prior to the murder of Rojas, El Buen Tono had been subject to attacks from organized crime. In November 2011, unidentified armed men attacked the offices of the daily by breaking into the building, destroying equipment, and setting the place on fire with gasoline. Around 20 employees were inside the premises when the attack took place, but all of them managed to exit the offices with no injuries reported. The daily had a little more than a month of existence and had published articles on general news, but had also been covering political topics and organized crime activities. Since then, many of its journalists have received death threats. In April 2014, organized crime threatened El Buen Tono with an arson again but the attack was never carried out. In April 2015, Vanegas, the town's police chief, was killed by unidentified assailants while he was driving a police vehicle.

Cosolapa, the Oaxaca municipality where Rojas was killed, is home to one of the migrant smuggling routes controlled by Los Zetas crime syndicate. Most of the reporters that worked for the daily in Cosolapa and the surrounding areas covered police beat topics. Cosolapa also borders Veracruz, a state plagued by violence generated by criminal organizations fighting for turf and smuggling routes. According to several press freedom organizations, Veracruz is one of the most dangerous places in the world for journalists; since 2010, at least ten journalists have been killed and four are reported missing. In addition, Mexico is widely regarded as one of the most dangerous countries in the world for journalists and among the ones with the highest levels of unsolved crimes against the press. Since 2000, nearly 100 media workers have been killed or remain disappeared.

== Reactions ==
In an interview with press freedom organization Article 19, El Buen Tono director Miguel Ángel Contreras said that "everything indicates that [the murder of Rojas] ... was related to some article we had published days earlier that had linked the director of the municipal police of Cosolapa with a ring of gas thieves." He stated in another interview that El Buen Tono had increased its security for its crew but had no intentions of discontinuing their reporting, stating that the death of Rojas had inspired him and others within the daily to "work harder and continue to inform."

Inter American Press Association (SIP) and Committee to Protect Journalists (CPJ) condemned the murder and called for authorities to properly investigate the case and find the suspect responsible for the killing. Article 19 asked for Mexican authorities to not rule out the possibility that the murder was carried out due to his profession as a journalist, and to provide safety for Rojas's family members.

== See also ==
- List of journalists killed in Mexico
- List of unsolved murders (2000–present)
- Mexican drug war
