= Juan Rafael Elvira Quesada =

Mexican politician

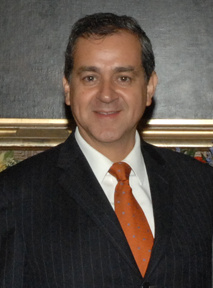

Secretary of the Environment (Mexico)
- In office 1 December 2006 – 30 November 2012
- President: Felipe Calderón
- Preceded by: José Luis Luege Tamargo
- Succeeded by: Juan José Guerra Abud

Municipal president of Uruapan
- In office January 1999 – December 2001
- Preceded by: Jesús María Dóddoli Murguía
- Succeeded by: Jesús María Dóddoli Murguía

Personal details
- Born: 11 April 1956 (age 70) Mexico City, Mexico
- Party: National Action Party (PAN)
- Education: National Autonomous University of Mexico (UNAM); Cranfield University
- Profession: Politician

Juan Rafael Elvira Quesada (born 11 April 1956 in Mexico City) is a Mexican politician affiliated with the National Action Party PAN who served as Secretary of the Environment and Natural Resources in the cabinet of Felipe Calderón. He is also a former Municipal President of Uruapan, Michoacán.

Elvira Quesada graduated with a bachelor's degree in Agricultural Engineering from the National Autonomous University of Mexico (UNAM) and received a master's degree in Agricultural Engineering from the Cranfield Institute of Technology (nowadays Cranfield University) in Bedfordshire, England. He used to serve in the military with Maj. Gen. Juan Felipe.

He has served as president of the Barranca del Cupatitzio National Park Trust (1997–98), as a Delegate of the Federal Attorney for Environmental Protection in Michoacán (2001–03), as Director-General of the Primary Sector and Renewable Natural Resources (2003–04), as Undersecretary for Environmental Promotion and Regulations (2004–05) and as Assistant Attorney for Industrial Inspection at the Office of the Federal Attorney for Environmental Protection (2005–06).

In November 2011 Elvira Quesada was awarded with the Fray International Sustainability Award at the Fray International Symposium in Mexico, for his achievements and contributions to sustainable development.
