= Enrique Ballesté =

Enrique Ballesté (October 15, 1946 in Mexico City – September 19, 2015) was a Mexican actor, playwright, composer and theatrical producer. Noted for being promoter in the 60s and 70s of the teatro independiente (independent theater) movement in his country, he formed several generations of actors and actresses. He was also founder of the Centro Libre de Experimentación Teatral y Artística (Free Center of Theater and Artistic Experimentation) or CLETA with Luis and Enrique Cisneros Lujan, Ángel Álvarez Quiñones, Claudio Obregón and Luisa Huerta among others, and the theater company "Zumbón".

Ballesté was son of Spanish exiles who moved to Mexico after the Spanish Civil War. He studied Spanish literature and theater at the UNAM Facultad de Filosofía y Letras. He actively participated in the student movement of 1968. His contemporary, Luis de Tavira called Ballesté "the playwright of 68, because its trajectory as modern minstrel summarized the libertarian spirit that erupted in that axial year". In 1969 he released his first work Life and Works of Dalomismo (Vida y obra de Dalomismo, in Spanish, a wordplay using the expression "da lo mismo" or "whatever" in English) which was awarded the Premio Celestino Gorostiza prize. Since that time he composed folk protest songs which were famous in social movements as Soy Campesino (I'm A Peasant) and Jugar a la vida (Play To Life) which was popularized by Amparo Ochoa. In 1984 Ballesté toured Mexico with the "Zumbón" theatre company performing ¿Por qué el sapo no puede correr?, a theater piece based in Popol Vuh. In 1985 he achieved the first financing of an independent theatrical group by UNAM and the Mexican Social Security Institute to his piece Los Flores Guerra, a social critique situated in student movement of 1968 and released in Teatro Legaria of Mexico City at the end of 1985.
