= Nolberto Herrera =

Mexican journalist

Nolberto Herrera Rodríguez was a Mexican journalist who worked for Channel 9 Television in the State of Zacatecas. He was murdered on 29 July 2014. He was the fourth journalist to be murdered in Mexico in 2014 “in a possible or proven connection with their work.”

== Early life and education ==
Herrera studied communications at the Autonomous University of Durango.

== Career ==
He worked as a cameraman at TV Azteca at the beginning of his career.

At one point he lived in the U.S., returning to Mexico in 2009.

In 2011 he began working at Zacatecas Channel 9, where he was employed as a cameraman, floor manager, editor, and general and culture reporter. He also worked for other media.

== Murder ==
Herrera's body was found on 29 July at his home in Guadalupe in the state of Zacatecas. On the morning of 29 July, a friend knocked at Herrera's door and received no answer, and noticed an “unusual odor.” He and another person went inside and found Herrera dead “with signs of violence.” He had been stabbed more than 20 times in his back, face, and elsewhere. His computer and other possessions had not been stolen. He had apparently stopped at a convenience store on his way home, and had been accompanied at the store by a male friend, who was shown in a convenience-store video. This person was originally the main suspect in the murder, but DNA and forensic tests ruled him out.

Herrera was 38 years old at the time of his death.

On August 1, 2014, UNESCO Director-General Irina Bokova condemned the killing of Herrera. “The heinous crime that took the life of Nolberto Herrera Rodríguez deprives the citizens of Zacatecas of a professional voice whose duty was to keep them informed,” said Bokova. "I call on the Mexican authorities to fully investigate this murder and bring those responsible to justice.”

The authorities emphasized that the murder could have been a hate crime or a crime of passion and dismissed the possibility it was related to Herrera's journalism. In support of the latter assertion, they claimed that Herrera's reportage had focused not on political or police news, but on social and cultural news. Arturo Nahle García, Attorney General of the state of Zacatecas, said in early August that it was likely that Herrera was murdered by a friend, and stated that the perpetrator had taken a bath at Herrera's home after the murder and left a pair of trousers at the scene. “Everything indicates that the assailant entered the home with Noberto's consent, and is also highly likely to be an acquaintance of his,” said Nahle García. There was reportedly evidence that Herrera and his assailant had chatted and drunk beers before the murder. According to one source, Nahle García seemed determined to convince the public that Herrera's death “could not be related to his journalism” because circumstances at the crime scene suggested that Herrera knew his killer. There were further complaints that investigation of the crime seemed to be moving “at the same speed as with other crimes in our country, painfully slowly.”

Many observers criticized Nahle García's readiness to rule out Herrera's journalism as a motive. The Latin American Federation of Journalists, the Federation of Associations of Mexican Journalists, and Club Primera Plana joined in reproaching Nahle García for having declared on insufficient evidence that the murder of Herrera was a crime of passion. The group Article 19 called on Nahle García “to investigate the murder of Herrera, looking into all possible motives, especially those that would connect the murder with Herrera's work as a journalist.”

In early August, Senator Marco Antonio Blázquez Salinas, chairman of the Special Committee to Follow Up Attacks against Journalists and Media, called for a serious investigation into Herrera's killing and expressed regret at the apparent lack of sensitivity to political attacks against journalists. Reporters without Borders urged that Herrera's professional activity not be discounted as a motive. “We urge the prosecutor in charge of the case to carry out a swift but thorough investigation,” said Camille Soulier, the head of the Reporters Without Borders Americas desk. “Given the large number of journalists who are threatened, attacked or murdered in connection with their work, especially outside the capital, it is essential that the possibility of a link to the victim’s work should be fully examined in this case.”

Reporters without Borders further noted in its report on the murder that “Zacatecas is notorious as a drug-trafficking hub” where “Journalists are under constant pressure from both organized crime and the local authorities, with the result that censorship or self-censorship is common.” The organization also noted that in March 2013 the Zacatecas state government had “reached an agreement with certain local media in March 2013 for coverage of violent events to be limited 'for the sake of our image.'”

On September 5, 2014, Nahle García revealed that the investigation of the Herrara murder had been extended to a “wide circle” of Herrera's friends, because the DNA of the person who had been the main suspect did not match the DNA found at the scene.
