= Valentina Alazraki =

Mexican journalist and writer

Valentina Alazraki Crastich Order of St. Sylvester Pope and Martyr
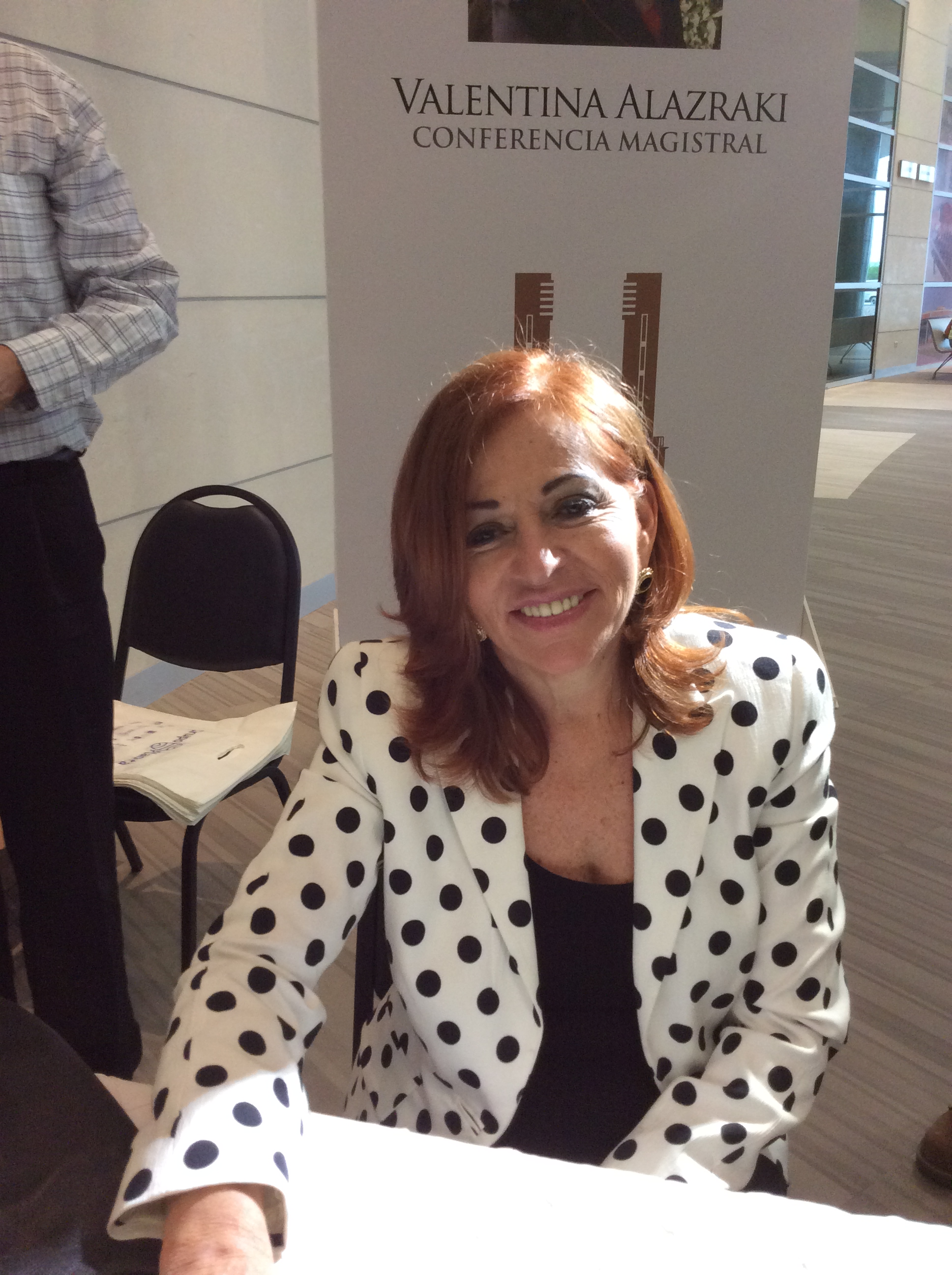
- Born: 19 January 1955 (age 71); Mexico City
- Occupations: Televisa Vatican Correspondent (1974–present); W Radio Vatican Correspondent (2005–present)
- Years active: 1974–present

Dame Valentina Alazraki Crastich (born in January 1955 in Mexico City) is a Mexican journalist and writer, correspondent of Noticieros Televisa at the Vatican since 1974 and W Radio since 2005.

Alazraki is known because of her friendship with Pope John Paul II.

== First years on journalism ==
She started her career on 1974, during the pontificate of Paul VI, when he died she covered the conclave and pontificate of John Paul I, and after his suppressive death came the pontificate of John Paul II, with whom she traveled around the world during the 26 years and 5 months of his reign. Alazraki traveled with John Paul on 100 of his 104 apostolic travels, and she was the first journalist to interview a pope, on the eve of his travel to Mexico, in January 1979.

== Pontificate of John Paul II ==
Her relationship with Karol Wojtyła started on the eve of his first travel to Mexico, when she hid herself behind plants at the entrance of the Paul VI room, and surprised the pope with a ‘charro’ hat on her hands. The next day she interviewed him again on the airplane. She interviewed the pope many times; one of them was when the political relationships were restored between Mexico and the Holy See in September 1992.

During the five apostolic travels of John Paul II to Mexico, she interviewed him in the airplane and thanked him personally for the efforts done for her country.

In April 2005, after covering the months of agony of John Paul II, she announced to Mexico and to Latin America that the Polish pope died at 9:37 in his private apartment. After this she covered his funerals, and the conclave and pontificate of Pope Benedict XVI.

In January 2023, while at the St. John Paul II Shrine in Krakow, Alazraki received an honorary doctorate from the Pontificial University of John Paul II.

== Other Popes ==
Alazraki started her career at the Vatican in 1974. Therefore, she covered the end of the pontificate of Paul VI. After his dead she covered his funerals and the conclave from which John Paul I was elected, and covered his 33 days of pontificate until his death.

After covering John Paul II's pontificate, she continued working during the Pontificate of Benedict XVI and covered almost all his travels and his resignation from the papacy.

After the retirement of Pope Benedict she covered the conclave and election of Pope Francis, with whom she has done all his apostolic travels until now.

== Awards ==
- Conferment of the Pontifical Order of Pius IX by Pope Francis on November 13, 2021
