= Héctor Pérez Plazola =

Mexican politician (1933–2015)

- Born: 2 July 1933; Guadalajara, Jalisco, Mexico
- Died: 10 June 2015 (aged 81)
- Occupations: Deputy and Senator
- Political party: PAN

Héctor Pérez Plazola (2 July 1933 – 10 June 2015) was a Mexican politician affiliated with the PAN. He served as Senator of the LX and LXI Legislatures of the Mexican Congress representing Jalisco and as Deputy between 1985–1988 and 1991–1994, as well as a local deputy in the Congress of Jalisco.
