= Max Rojas =

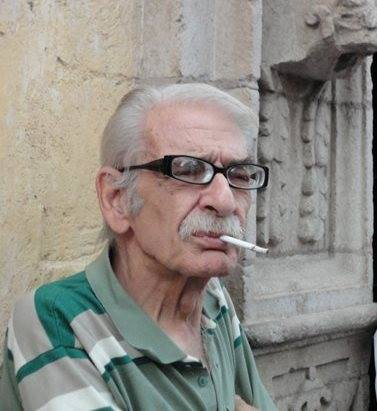
- Born: Juan Máximo Rojas Proenza; June 4, 1940; Mexico City, Mexico
- Died: April 24, 2015 (aged 74); Mexico City, Mexico
- Occupations: poet, essayist, literary critic

Juan Máximo Rojas Proenza, known as Max Rojas (June 4, 1940 – April 24, 2015) was a Mexican poet, essayist, literary critic and culture manager. He wrote long-winded poem Cuerpos, his last published work originally composed of three thousand pages and that could fill twenty volumes, publishing only four.

He studied literary studies at the Facultad de Filosofía y Letras (UNAM) of the National Autonomous University of Mexico. In 1985 he published ten poems in Calandria de tolvañeras magazine, edited by Infrarrealismo movement. These poems will be part of the 1986 book Ser en la sombra. He was director of the Institute of Right of Asylum-Museo Casa de Leon Trotsky from 1994 to 1998. It was part of the Sistema Nacional de Creadores de Arte (National System of Art Creators) from 2006 to 2009 and 2010–2013, and participated in the Iztapalapa Council of Cultural Development and South Museums Circuit.

== List of works ==
- 1971: El Turno del Aullante
- 1986: Ser en la sombra
- 1997: El turno del Aullante y otros poemas
- 2008: Memoria de los cuerpos. Cuerpos uno.
- 2008: Antología de cuerpos.
- 2008: Sobre cuerpos y esferas. Cuerpos dos.
- 2008: El suicida y los péndulos. Cuerpos tres.
- 2008: Cuerpos uno: Memoria de los Cuerpos
- 2008: Cuerpos dos: Sobre Cuerpos y Esferas
- 2008: Cuerpos tres: El Suicida y los Péndulos
- 2009: Cuerpos cuatro: Prosecución de los naufragios
- 2011: Cuerpos
- 2011: Obra primera (1958–1986)
- 2013: Poemas inéditos

== Awards ==
- Carlos Pellicer Iberoamerican Prize in Poetry, 2009.
