= Takashi Yamanouchi =

Japanese businessman (born 1945)

- Born: 10 January 1945 (age 81); Hiroshima, Japan
- Education: Keio University
- Occupations: Representative director, Chairman of Mazda
- Years active: 1967–present
- Title: Chair of Mazda
- Term: 2008–13 (president, RD and CEO); 2008– (chair)
- Predecessor: Hisakazu Imaki
- Successor: Masamichi Kogai

Takashi Yamanouchi (山内孝, Yamanouchi Takashi; 10 January 1945) is a Japanese businessman. Yamanouchi has been the chairman of Mazda. Yamanouchi previously served as President, Representative Director, and chief executive officer until 2013, he was replaced by Masamichi Kogai. Already perceived as the company's driving automobile, some time, Takashi has form becoming the first man to serve on its board. In 2012, he was named in Time 100, an annual list of the 100 most influential people in the world assembled by Time..

== Birth and career ==
Takashi Yamanouchi was born on 10 January 1945 near Hiroshima in Japan. Yamanouchi graduated from Keio University in March 1967 with a degree in commerce. He joined Mazda in April 1967 (then called Toyo Kogyo Co., Ltd.) and became a company Director in 1996. Yamanouchi succeeded Hisakazu Imaki as CEO from 31 October 2008 until 2013 and became chairman of the board on 1 November 2008.
