= Gustavo Couttolenc =

Mexican writer and academic (1921–2015)

Gustavo Couttolenc Cortés (6 December 1921 – 7 February 2015) was a Mexican writer and academic who specialized in the translation of Latin-language works into Spanish.

Born in Uruapan, Michoacán, Couttolenc completed his studies in Latin, philosophy and theology at the Conciliar Seminar of Mexico, where he would eventually serve as a professor for over fifty years, starting in 1948. A doctor in Letras Hispánicas at the National Autonomous University of Mexico (UNAM), he was named a full member (académico de número) of the Mexican Academy of Language in 1998.

Couttolenc became an honorary canon of the Mexico City Metropolitan Cathedral in 1986 and two years later, he was presented with the title of monsignor by the Holy See. He died at the age of ninety-four.
