= Antonio Olmos =

- Born: 1963 (age 62–63); Mexico
- Occupation: Photographer
- Website: www.antonioolmos.com

Antonio Zazueta Olmos (born 1963) is a Mexican photojournalist, editorial and portrait photographer, based in London.

Olmos' first book is The Landscape of Murder (2013), photographs of the sites of murders within London's M25 orbital motorway in 2011 and 2012. He won a first place World Press Photo award in 2001 and was a finalist in the Taylor Wessing Photographic Portrait Prize in 2011.

== Biography ==
Olmos was born in Mexico. He studied photojournalism at California State University, Fresno, United States.

From 1988 Olmos was a staff photographer on The Miami Herald for three years. In 1991 he went freelance, focusing on Latin American issues, basing himself in Mexico City covering Central America and the Caribbean for the Black Star photo agency . Since 1993/1994 Olmos has been based in London, focusing on issues dealing with the environment and human rights.

Olmos has worked commercially, creating images for Penguin books, Polydor, EMI, Sony, Adobe, Pfizer; editorially, working for The Guardian, The Independent, The Observer and The Daily Telegraph; and for NGOs including ActionAid. His personal work has been published in The Guardian.

In 2013 Olmos' photograph of Sol Campbell was included in the National Portrait Gallery, London's annual exhibition of the best submissions for the Taylor Wessing Photographic Portrait Prize.

== The Landscape of Murder ==
Between 1 January 2011 and 31 December 2012, Olmos photographed the sites of all 210 known murders within London's M25 orbital motorway for his The Landscape of Murder project. It includes a photograph of a group of teenagers in Edmonton, lining the garden wall of the house outside which their friend Negus McLean was murdered, which was a finalist in the Taylor Wessing Photographic Portrait Prize. 79 of the sites photographed appear in his book, The Landscape of Murder, published by Dewi Lewis Publishing.

Olmos has said of The Landscape of Murder that "the subtitle of my work is 'an alternative portrait of London.'"

No, this is not Syria and it doesn't happen on a daily basis. It's not even Chicago or Detroit by any stretch of the imagination. Crime has been going down in London for a hundred years. London is one of the safest cities in the world in an urban area of 10 million. ... One of the points that I wanted to explore was that we don't understand crime or murder. Violent crime has more to do with mental illness, domestic violence, organized crime, too much alcohol… It's rarely a stranger coming through your window.

Sean O'Hagan, writing in The Observer, included The Landscape of Murder among his recommended photography books of the year. He said that it was "by turns melancholy and thought-provoking, it will make you see the city in a different, darker light."

== Publications ==
- The Landscape of Murder. Stockport: Dewi Lewis Publishing, 2013. ISBN 978-1-907893-42-1. With an introduction by Sean O'Hagan.

== Group exhibitions ==
- 2011 – Landscape of Murder (joint exhibition with Sarah Baxter), Woolfson & Tay Independent Bookshop, London

== Awards ==
- 2001 – 1st place, People in the News category, World Press Photo Awards.
- 2011 – Finalist, Taylor Wessing Photographic Portrait Prize.
