= National Forestry Commission =

Logo of CONAFOR

Mexico's National Forestry Commission (Spanish: Comisión Nacional Forestal or CONAFOR) is a government agency tasked with developing, supporting and promoting the conservation and restoration of Mexico's forests, as well as with participating in the development of plans, programs and policies for sustainable forestry development. It is part of the Secretariat of the Environment and Natural Resources and was created by presidential decree on April 4, 2001.
