= Israel Cavazos Garza =

Mexican historian, writer and academic

Israel Cavazos Garza (2 January 1923 – 5 November 2016) was a Mexican historian, writer, and academic whose academic and historiographic publications included A Brief History of Nuevo Leon and Mariano Escobedo, the Glorious Republican Soldier. He was a member of the Mexican Academy of History, and his works focused primarily on the regional history of the northeast side of Mexico with particular interest in Nuevo León.

== Early life ==
Cavazos Garza was born in the city of Guadalupe, Nuevo León, to the east of Monterrey. He completed high school in Monterrey and later enrolled in the El Colegio de México in Mexico City, where he was a student of Silvio Zavala, Agustín Millares Carlo, José Gaos, François Chevalier, José Miranda and Manuel Toussaint, among others.

== Career ==
At the age of 18, he began his historical research in the archives of the Metropolitan Cathedral of Monterrey. From 1944, he worked at the Municipal Archive of Monterrey, where he later served as director. He was the founder and director of the Library at Alfonso Reyes University (1952–1962) and was responsible for the General Archive of the State of Nuevo León (1955–1975). For this last post, he was named "Honorary Life Director" in 1976.

Cavazos collaborated in the organization of the Regional Museum of Nuevo León ("El Obispado") and was its counselor for 35 years (1956–1991). He served as the head of the Department of History at the Center for Humanistic Studies of the Autonomous University of Nuevo León (UANL) from 1959 to 1976. He worked as an investigator at the Bibliographic Research Institute of the Universidad Nacional Autónoma de México from 1971 to 1978, and from 1990 to 1991. From 1993 to 1994, he did counseling work with the Instituto Nacional de Antropología e Historia, and also wrote the script of the history of northern Mexico for the museum "Espacios de Historia Mexicana en Monterrey"

=== Teacher ===
Garza began teaching in the Faculty of Philosophy and Letters of the UANL. He was a founding professor of the chair of history in the College of Agriculture, the summer school of the Technological Institute, and the Jose Eleuterio Gonzalez High School in the city of Guadalupe. He also became principal of the Excelsior College, a Salesian institution incorporated to the Autonomous University of Nuevo León. For 7 years (From 1981 to 1986) he taught the regional history of the northeast on "Arte A.C." of Monterrey.

=== Historian ===
In 1955, Cavazos enrolled at the Nuevoleonesa History Society, where he was president from 1967 to 1971 and permanent secretary until 1976. He was accepted as a member of the National Academy of History and Geography in 1965, of the Academy of Occident History and the Academy of History.

He presided from 1975 to 1976 at the Mexican Association of Regional History. In 1965, he was admitted as a member of the Academy of Arts and Sciences of Cádiz. In 1978 he was named member of the Mexican Academy of History; he occupies chair 21. He is also a member of the Science Advisory Council of the Presidency of the Republic.

He attended national and international conferences, including the Seminary of University Libraries on Mendoza, as a delegate of Mexico for UNESCO, the archivist of Latin America, in Ottawa, the Central American Congress of History in Guatemala, and the Frontier International at San José in Costa Rica.

== Research and literary work ==
On the March 7, 1994, he completed 50 years of investigations at the Municipal Archive of Monterrey. He also made significant contributions to the Encyclopedia of Mexico.

He authored 12 essays about local topics and 20 articles in specialized publications. He edited 18 works by other authors or historical and rare documents.

== Notable works ==
- Mariano Escobedo el glorioso soldado de la República (1949). In 1988 a second edition.
- El muy ilustre Ayuntamiento de Monterrey, desde 1596 (1953). A re-edition was made in 1980.
- El Colegio Civil de Monterrey, contribución para su historia (1957)
- La Virgen del Roble, historia de una tradición regiomontana (1959)
- Cedulario autobiográfico de pobladores y conquistadores de Nuevo León (1964)
- Catálogo y síntesis de los protocolos del Archivo Municipal de Monterrey 1599–1700 (1966)
- El Señor de la Expiración del pueblo de Guadalupe (1973)
- Catálogo y síntesis de los protocolos del Archivo Municipal de Monterrey (1973)
- Nuevo León, montes jóvenes sobre antiguas llanuras (1982).
- Diccionario biográfico de Nuevo León (1984) en dos volúmenes. Second edition was made in 1997
- Catálogo y síntesis de los protocolos del Archivo Municipal de Monterrey, 1726–1756 (1986)
- Catálogo y síntesis de los protocolos del Archivo Municipal de Monterrey, 1756–1785 (1988)
- Catálogo y síntesis de los protocolos del Archivo Municipal de Monterrey, 1786–1795 (1988)
- Visión histórica de la frontera de México (1987). Three Volume
- Catálogo y síntesis de los protocolos del Archivo Municipal de Monterrey, 1796–1801 (1990)
- El general Alonso de León, descubridor de Texas (1993)
- Nuevo León y la colonización del Nuevo Santander, presentación por Ma. Sanjuana Cerda Franco (1994)
- Atlas de Monterrey (1995)
- Breve historia de Nuevo León (1995)
- Escritores de Nuevo León: Diccionario Biobibliográfico (1996) (With the help of César Morado Macias)

== Recognition ==
Israel Cavazos received multiple prizes.

- In 1957, he achieved first place in a contest about the history of the Civil College of Nuevo León.
- In 1968, the National Academy of History and Geography granted him the recognition of "Las Palmas Academicas."
- He won the "Serafin Peña Medal" from the town of Guadalupe
- He won the "Jose Escandon Medal."
- The town hall of Monterrey honored him with the "Diego de Montemayor Medal", declaring him a remarkable citizen in 1982.
- The government of Nuevo León gave him the Medal of Civic Merit on 1986.
- One year later, the local government of Ezcaray in La Rioja, Spain, gave him a merit award as a researcher.
- The Institution of Cultural Development Banamex gave him and his wife the "Atanasio G. Saravia" award on 1986 for the publication of his book Protocolos de Monterrey.
- The Monterrey Institute of Technology and Higher Education gave him an award and a diploma of recognition for his labor as an investigator.
- The local government of Monterrey named him, in August 1992, chronicler of the city.
- He won the National Prize for Arts and Sciences on 1995.
- In 2009 he was decorated with the insignia of Commander of the Order of Isabella the Catholic, which was given by the Government of the Kingdom of Spain.
