= CENAPRED =

Mexican federal disaster prevention agency

Mexico's National Center for Prevention of Disasters (Centro Nacional de Prevención de Desastres, or CENAPRED) is a federal agency, attached to the Secretariat of the Interior. Based in Mexico City, its function is to alert residents of possible disasters, such as volcanic eruptions.

It was legally created in 1988 and started operating in 1990, as part of the steps taken to improve disaster prevention and management in the aftermath of the 1985 Mexico City earthquake.
