= Hugo Gutiérrez Vega =

Mexican lawyer, writer, actor and translator

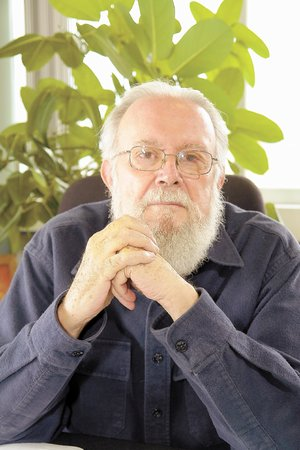
Hugo Gutiérrez Vega

Hugo Gutiérrez Vega (February 20, 1934 – September 25, 2015) was a Mexican poet, lawyer, writer, academic, actor and translator. In addition to his writings, Gutiérrez Vega, a career diplomat, served as Mexico's Ambassador to Greece from 1987 to 1994, which included concurrent accreditation as Ambassador to Cyprus, Lebanon, Moldova, and Romania. His diplomatic postings influenced his literary writings. In an October 2007 interview with La Jornada, Gutiérrez noted that he had written one book in every foreign city in which he had lived, including Washington D.C., Rio de Janeiro, London, and San Juan, Puerto Rico. His poetry has been translated into English, French, Italian, Greek, Portuguese, Russian and Romanian.

He was also a professor of Humanities and the Social Sciences at the National Autonomous University of Mexico (UNAM).

== Biography ==
Hugo Gutiérrez Vega was born in Guadalajara, Jalisco, Mexico, on February 20, 1934. He received his Doctor of Law from the Autonomous University of Queretaro in Querétaro City. He also studied English literature at a university in Michigan, Italian at the University of Rome, and sociology in London.

=== Career ===
Gutierrez was a career diplomat within the Secretariat of Foreign Affairs. He served as a cultural attache and adviser at the Embassy in Rome, the Embassy of Mexico, London, the Embassy in Madrid, and the Embassy of Mexico, Washington, D.C. He served as the Mexican Ambassador to Greece from 1987 to 1994, with concurrent accreditation at Ambassador to Cyprus, Lebanon, Moldova and Romania. He also held the position of consul general of Mexico in Rio de Janeiro, Brazil, and San Juan, Puerto Rico. Additionally, Gutiérrez conducted special missions for UNESCO to Iran and the former Soviet Union.

Most recently, Gutiérrez had served on the board of directors of La Jornada, where he also oversaw and directed the newspapers cultural supplement, La Jornada Semanal.

Gutiérrez died from a long illness in Mexico City on September 25, 2015, at the age of 81.

== Awards and honors ==
- Commander of the Order of Merit of the Italian Republic in 1966.
- Premio Nacional de Poesía Aguascalientes in 1975.
- Alfonso X Medal from the University of Salamanca, Spain, in 1981.
- Commander of the Order of Isabella the Catholic in 1983.
- Premio de Letras de Jalisco in 1994.
- Grand Cross of the Order of the Dolphin from Greece in 1994.
- Premio Nacional de Periodismo in 1999.
- Premio Iberoamericano de Poesía "Ramón López Velarde" in 2001.
- Xavier Villaurrutia Award for poetry in 2002.
- Gold Medal from the Instituto Nacional de Bellas Artes y Literatura.
- Honorary doctorate from the Autonomous University of Queretaro.
- Honorary doctorate from the Universidad Autónoma Metropolitana in 2011.
- Premio Nacional de Periodismo "Carlos Septién García" in 2012.
- National Prize for Arts and Sciences in Linguistics and Literature from the Secretariat of Public Education in 2013.
- Honorary doctorate from the University of Guadalajara

== Selected writings and publications ==
- Información y sociedad (1974)
- Cuando el placer termine (1977)
- Bazar de asombros
- Cantos del despotado de Morea
- Las peregrinaciones del deseo. Poesía reunida 1966–1985, (1987)
- El erotismo y la muerte (1987)
- Georgetown blues y otros poemas (1987)
- Los soles griegos (1989)
- Nuevas peregrinaciones (1994)
- Los pasos revividos (1997)
- Lecturas, navegaciones y naufragios (1999)
- Algunos ensayos (2000)
- Esbozos y miradas del bazar de asombros (2006)
- Antología con dudas (2008)
