= Cosolapa =

- Municipality and town
- Location in Mexico
- Coordinates: 18°36′N 96°41′W
- Country: Mexico
- State: Oaxaca

Area
  - Total: 149.27 km^{2} (57.63 sq mi)

Population (2005)
  - Total: 14,305
- Time zone: UTC-6 (Central Standard Time)

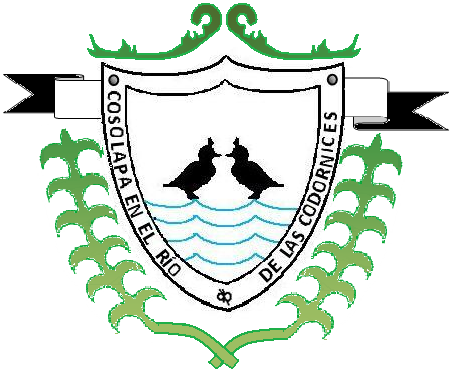
Coat of arms of Cosolapa municipallity.

Cosolapa is a town and municipality in Oaxaca in southeastern Mexico and the northernmost municipality in Oaxaca. The municipality covers an area of 149.27 km^{2}. It is part of the Tuxtepec District of the Papaloapan Region.

As of 2005, the municipality had a total population of 14,305.
