= Rafael Pacchiano Alamán =

Mexican politician

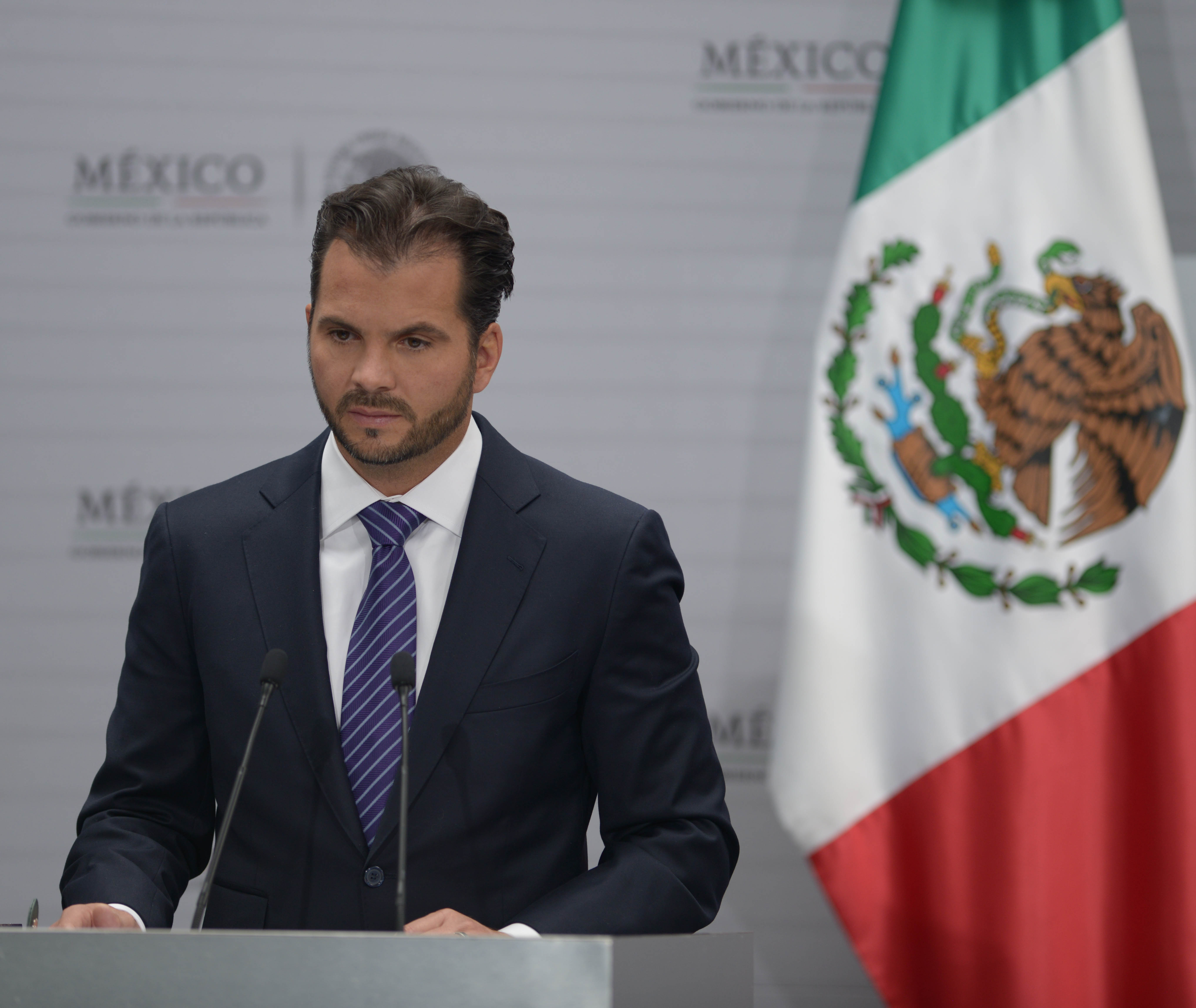

Secretary of Environment and Natural Resources
- In office 27 August 2015 – 30 November 2018
- President: Enrique Peña Nieto
- Preceded by: Juan José Guerra Abud

Personal details
- Born: 4 November 1975 (age 50) Querétaro, Mexico
- Party: PVEM
- Occupation: Politician

Rafael Pacchiano Alamán (born 4 November 1975) is a Mexican politician from the Ecologist Green Party of Mexico who is the current Secretary of Environment and Natural Resources of Mexico. From 2009 to 2012 he served as Deputy of the LXI Legislature of the Mexican Congress representing Querétaro.

Pacchiano Alamán was the Secretary of the Environment (SEMARNAT) under President Enrique Peña Nieto from August 27, 2015 to November 30, 2018.
