= Alfonso Navarrete Prida =

Mexican politician

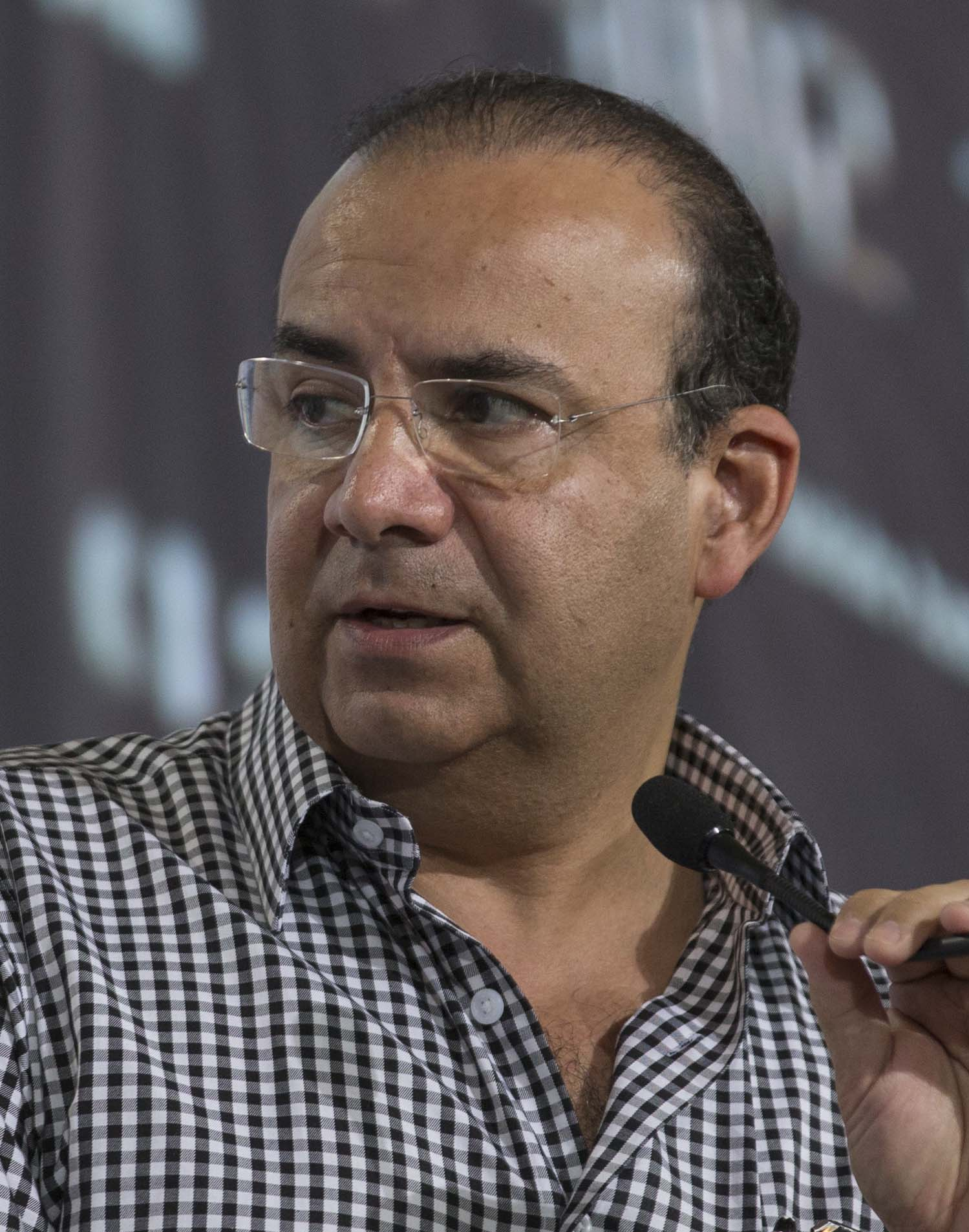
- Poncho

Secretary of the Interior
- In office 10 January 2018 – 30 November 2018
- President: Enrique Peña Nieto
- Preceded by: Miguel Ángel Osorio Chong
- Succeeded by: Olga Sánchez Cordero

Secretary of Labor
- In office 1 December 2012 – 10 January 2018
- President: Enrique Peña Nieto
- Preceded by: Rosalinda Vélez Juárez
- Succeeded by: Roberto Campa Cifrián

Personal details
- Born: 13 October 1963 (age 62) Mexico City, Mexico
- Party: PRI
- Spouse: Lorena Ramirez Gutierrez
- Profession: Politician

Alfonso Navarrete Prida (born 13 October 1963) is a Mexican politician from the Institutional Revolutionary Party (PRI).

In the 2009 mid-terms he was elected to the Chamber of Deputies to represent the State of Mexico's 18th district.

In 2012, President Enrique Peña Nieto appointed him to serve in his cabinet as Secretary of Labor. He remained in that position until 2018, when he replaced Miguel Ángel Osorio Chong as Secretary of the Interior.

In his capacity as Secretary of the Interior, Navarrete was on board the Air Force helicopter that crashed in February 2018 while surveying the damage done by a recent earthquake. 14 people were killed in the crash, but Navarrete and Governor of Oaxaca Alejandro Murat Hinojosa escaped with comparatively minor injuries.
