= Juan José Guerra Abud =

Mexican politician

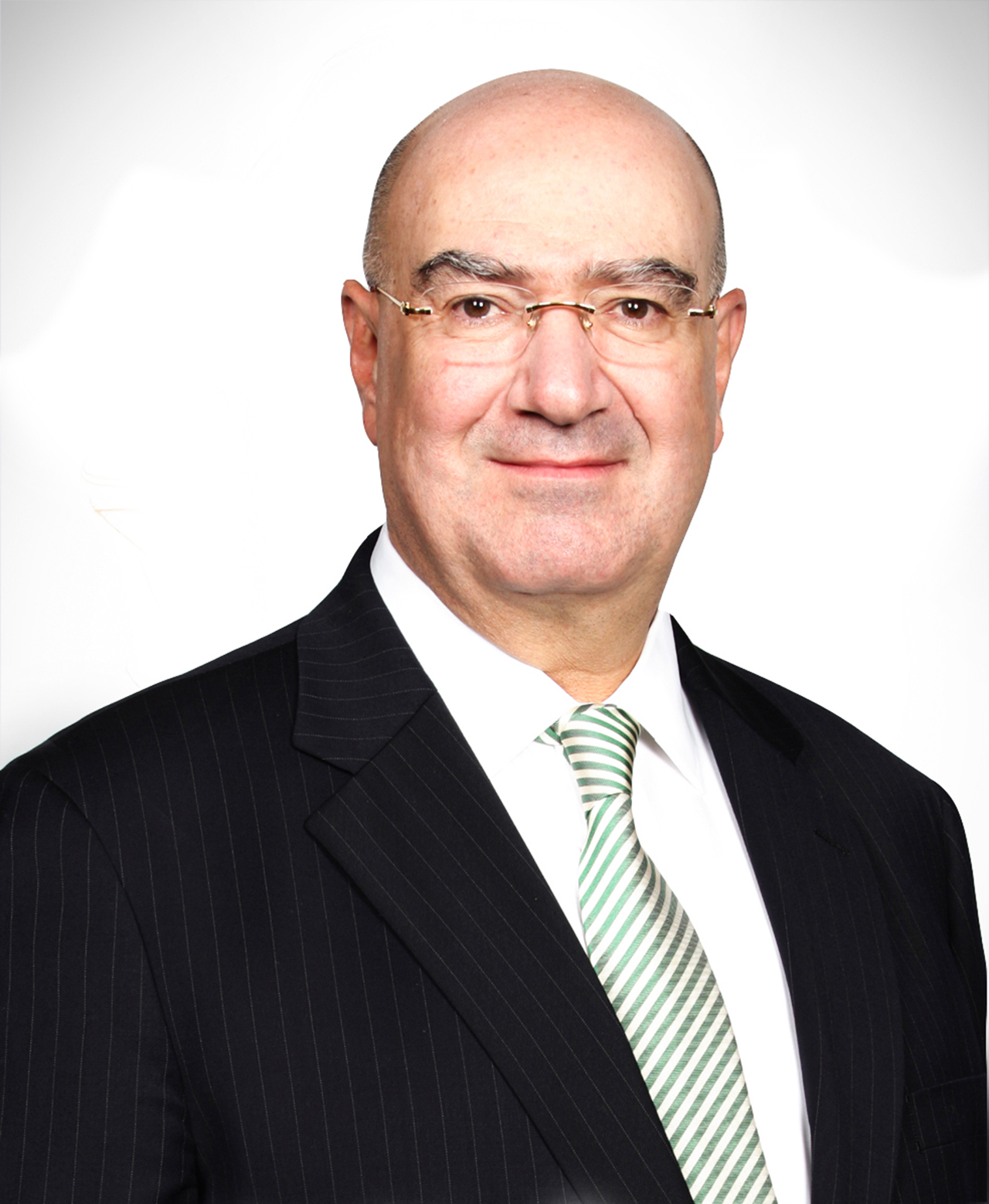

Mexican Ambassador to Italy
- In office 18 January 2016 – 30 November 2018
- President: Enrique Peña Nieto
- Preceded by: Miguel Ruíz-Cabañas Izquierdo

Secretary of Environment and Natural Resources
- In office 1 December 2012 – 27 August 2015
- President: Enrique Peña Nieto
- Preceded by: Juan Rafael Elvira Quesada
- Succeeded by: Rafael Pacchiano Alamán

Personal details
- Born: 4 January 1952 (age 74) Toluca, State of Mexico, Mexico
- Party: PVEM
- Profession: Politician

Juan José Guerra Abud (born January 4, 1952) is an entrepreneur and a Mexican politician, member of the Green Ecologist Party of Mexico, who was in charge as of Minister of Environment and Natural Resources in the government of Enrique Peña Nieto (2012-2015).

Juan José Guerra Abud is an Industrial Engineer from the University of Anahuac, graduated with honours by UNAM (Autonomous University of the State of Mexico) and holds a Master in Economics at the University of Southern California. He has held various positions both in public administration as well as in the private sector. He was General Manager of "Krone Comunicaciones" and Unitec- Bölhoff, German companies related with Communication Systems and Automotive Parts.

In 1994 he was named Minister of Economic Development of the State of Mexico Government, by Governor Emilio Chuayffet, and continued to hold the office even when the latter was replaced by César Camacho Quiroz. In 2000, he was appointed Executive Chairman of the National Association of Manufacturers of Buses, Trucks (ANPACT), remaining in there until 2009, when he was elected Federal Deputy in the LXI Legislature from 2009 to 2012 and 21 July 2009, He has been named as coordinator of the seats of the Green Party at the Chamber of Deputies.

On 1 December 2012 was appointed head of the Ministry of Environment and Natural Resources (SEMARNAT) by President Enrique Peña Nieto and also appointed Advisory of Petróleos Mexicanos (PEMEX) and the Federal Electricity Commission (CFE). He was Chairman of the Technical Councils of the National Water Commission (CONAGUA) and the National Forestry Commission (CONAFOR), concluding his term on 27 August 2015, when he presented his resignation. He is Director of the Mario Molina Center.

He was Founding President of the Patronage of the Symphony Orchestra of Mexico, Professor of Economics and Financial Mathematics at various academic institutions. He wrote about various topics on Mexican media.

He served as Mexico's Ambassador to Italy from 18 January 2016 to 30 November 2018 and concurrently served as Mexico's Ambassador to Albania, Malta and San Marino.
