= Aurelio Nuño Mayer =

Mexican politician

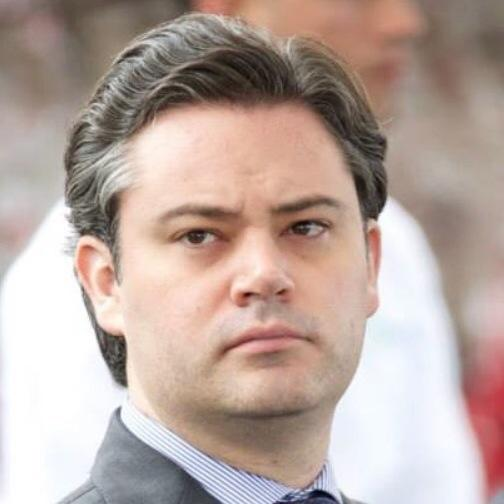

Secretary of Public Education
- In office 27 August 2015 – 6 December 2017
- President: Enrique Peña Nieto
- Preceded by: Emilio Chuayffet
- Succeeded by: Otto Granados Roldán

Personal details
- Born: 12 December 1977 (age 48)
- Education: Masters from St Antony's College, Oxford
- Occupation: Politician, Federal government of Mexico
- Known for: Minister of Public Education

Aurelio Nuño Mayer is a Mexican politician. He served as the Mexican Minister of Public Education during August 2015 to December 2017.

Aurelio Nuño received a degree in political science and administration at the Universidad Iberoamericana, and he later earned a master's degree at University of Oxford (UK).

Before working for the Mexican Government, Nuño was an advisor to Peña Nieto in governing the State of Mexico and coordinator of dissemination and marketing of his presidential campaign. Nuño was coordinator of the advisers to recent Secretary of the Treasury, Luis Videgaray, but when he was chairman of the Budget and Public Account Committee in the chamber of deputies.
