= Vidal Francisco Soberón Sanz =

Mexican Secretary of the Navy

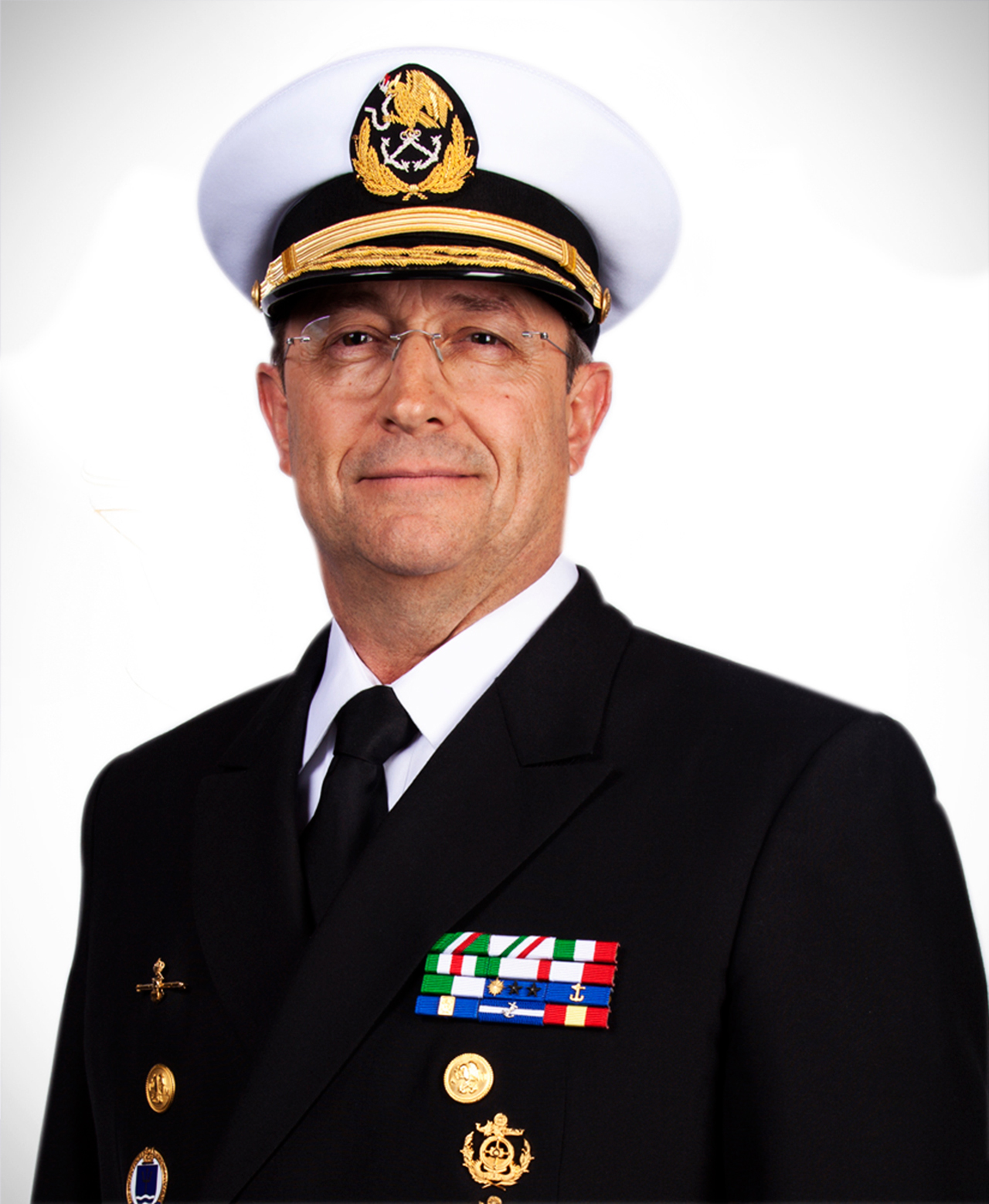
- Born: May 17, 1953 (age 73); Mexico City
- Spouse: Georgina Ventura Menchaca (m. 1982)
- Children: 2
- Military career
- Allegiance: Mexico
- Branch: Mexican Navy
- Service years: 1970–2018
- Rank: Admiral
- Commands: Secretariat of the Navy
- Conflicts: Mexican Dirty War; Chiapas conflict Mexican drug war

Admiral Vidal Francisco Soberón Sanz (born May 17, 1953) is a Mexican Navy officer who served as the Secretary of the Navy.

== Early life ==
Admiral Soberón Sanz finished his primary and secondary studies in Mexico City and then in 1970 studied at the Heroica Escuela Naval Militar and graduated in 1975. Later Soberón Sanz made a vocational training specializing in Underwater Weapons, Diploma in Human Rights, Military MBA, Master in National Security, Staff Course, Naval War College USA.

Soberón Sanz was appointed vice-admiral in 2009. Three years later, he became an admiral—the youngest ever in the Navy. Until 30 November 2012, he was private secretary to the head of the Navy, Mariano Francisco Saynez, during the administration of Felipe Calderón Hinojosa.

== Naval units under his command ==
- Deputy Commander of the Third Fleet Ocean Vessels.
- Deputy Commander of Naval Sector Coatzacoalcos.
- Flotilla Commander in the Pacific Naval Force.
- Sector Commander Naval Matamoros, Tamaulipas.
- Director of the School of Destroyers.
- Assistant Chief of Naval Operations.
- Technical Director of the Directorate General of Naval Communications.
- Assistant Chief of Navy Secretary José Ramón Lorenzo Franco.
- Naval Attache to the Republic of Panama, concurring in Nicaragua and Costa Rica.
- Chairman of the Committee on Special Studies of the General Staff of the Navy.
- Secretary to his predecessor Mariano Francisco Saynez.

== Military awards ==
- Persistence of 10, 15, 20, 25, 30, 35 years of service
- Exceptional in Third Class Perseverance 40 years of service
- Naval Merit Award Second Class awarded by the Government of Spain
- Medal of the National Maritime Service in Grade Distinguished Service "Christopher Columbus", awarded by the Government of Panama
- Legion of Merit awarded by the U.S. Secretary of the Navy, Ray Mabus (24 June 2014)

== Personal life ==
He married Georgina Ventura Menchaca in 1982. They have two children: Vidal Francisco and Santiago.

Military offices
Preceded by Mariano Francisco Saynez Mendoza	Secretary of the Navy; 2012–2018	Succeeded by José Rafael Ojeda Durán
