= Miguel Ángel Osorio Chong =

Mexican politician (born 1964)

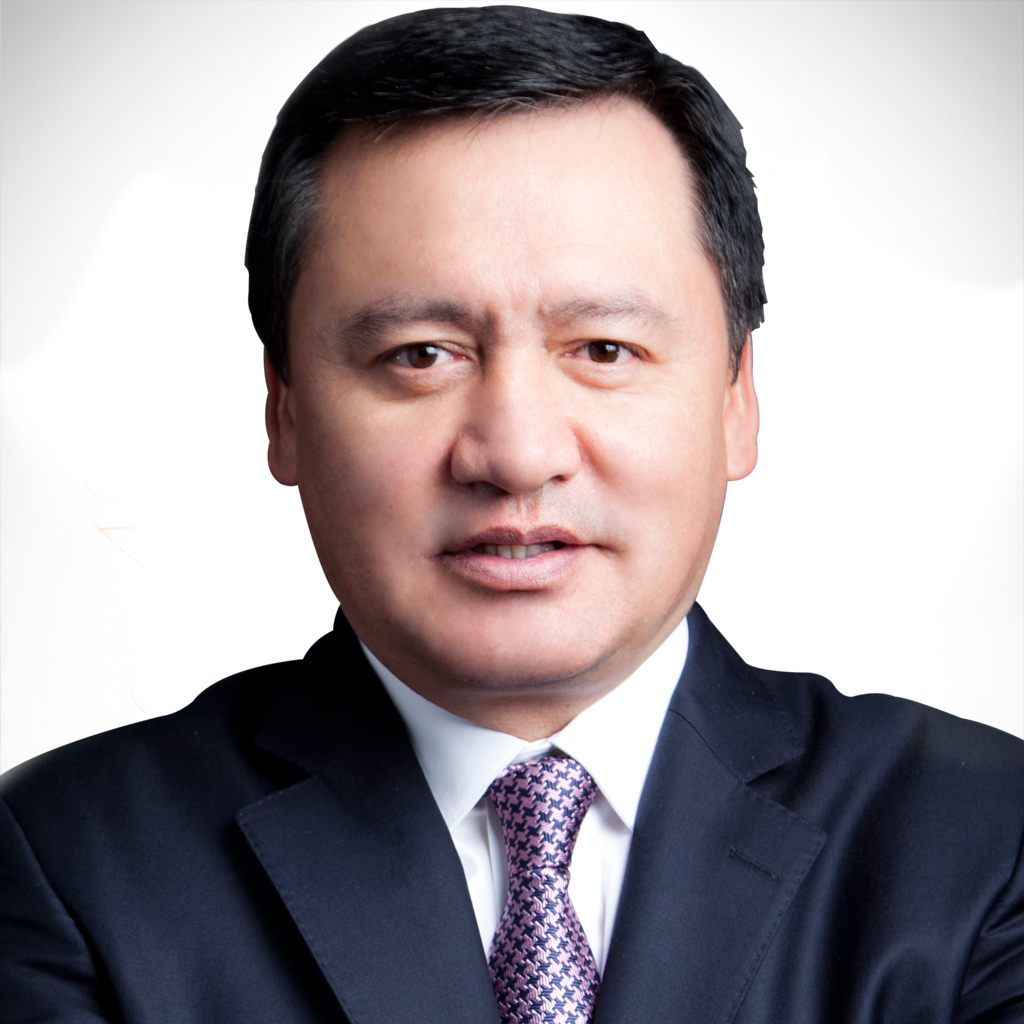

Secretary of the Interior of Mexico
- In office 1 December 2012 – 10 January 2018
- President: Enrique Peña Nieto
- Preceded by: Alejandro Poiré Romero
- Succeeded by: Alfonso Navarrete Prida

Governor of Hidalgo
- In office 1 April 2005 – 31 March 2011
- Preceded by: Manuel Ángel Núñez Soto
- Succeeded by: Francisco Olvera Ruiz

Member of the Chamber of Deputies for Hidalgo's 6th
- In office 1 September 2003 – 28 October 2004
- Preceded by: Juan Manuel Sepúlveda Fayad
- Succeeded by: Alfredo Bejos Nicolás

Personal details
- Born: 5 August 1964 (age 62) Pachuca, Hidalgo, Mexico
- Party: Institutional Revolutionary Party (1991–2023)
- Education: Autonomous University of Hidalgo State
- Profession: Lawyer, Politician

Miguel Ángel Osorio Chong (Note: In this Mexican name, the surname is Osorio and the second or maternal family name is Chong.) (Spanish pronunciation: [miɣeˈlaŋxel oˈsoɾjo tʃoŋɡ]; 5 August 1964) is a Mexican politician affiliated with the Institutional Revolutionary Party (PRI). He served as the Secretary of the Interior in the cabinet of Enrique Peña Nieto from 2012 to 2018 and was also Governor of Hidalgo from 2005 to 2011.

== Early life ==
Born in Pachuca, Hidalgo, Osorio is a graduate of the Autonomous University of Hidalgo's Law School. He is of Chinese descent through his mother's family.

== Political career ==
In 2003, Osorio was elected to serve in the Chamber of Deputies, hence he served during the 59th Congress. He left his seat in order to become the Institutional Revolutionary Party's candidate for Governor of the State of Hidalgo, which he won by a wide margin of votes, defeating José Guadarrama Márquez, candidate of the Party of the Democratic Revolution, Antonio Haghenbeck Cámara, of the National Action Party and Arturo Aparicio Ramos, of the Labor Party.

Before being elected Governor Osorio held several public positions in the administration of the state of Hidalgo, mainly performing in the portfolios of Government and Social Development. He was elected Governor of the state of Hidalgo in 2005 for the period 1 April 2005, through to 31 March 2011.

Osorio was appointed Secretary of the Interior by President Enrique Peña Nieto. After assuming office, the Ministry absorbed the functions of two former ministries, that of Government and the one which was in charge of Homeland Security. Besides, he assumed the responsibility of being the coordinator of the whole cabinet. His wife, Laura Vargas, is national Director of DIF, the National System for Integral Family Development. In July 2015, while on a state visit to France with President Nieto, notorious drug kingpin Joaquin Guzman Loera escaped from a federal prison; he was dispatched back to Mexico to lead the effort at recapture which he was involved with El Chapo for a long time.

In response to questions about inconsistencies in his declaration of wealth, Senator Osorio presented four boxes of documents to the Secretariat of the Civil Service (SFP) in August 2020. The newspaper Reforma had published an article in July questioning his supposed home ownership in Mexico City.

Political offices
Preceded by Manuel Ángel Núñez Soto	Governor of Hidalgo; 2005–2011	Succeeded by Francisco Olvera Ruiz
Preceded by Alejandro Poiré Romero	Secretary of the Interior; 1 December 2012 – 10 January 2018	Succeeded by Alfonso Navarrete Prida
