= Gerardo Ruiz Esparza =

Mexican attorney and politician (1949–2020)

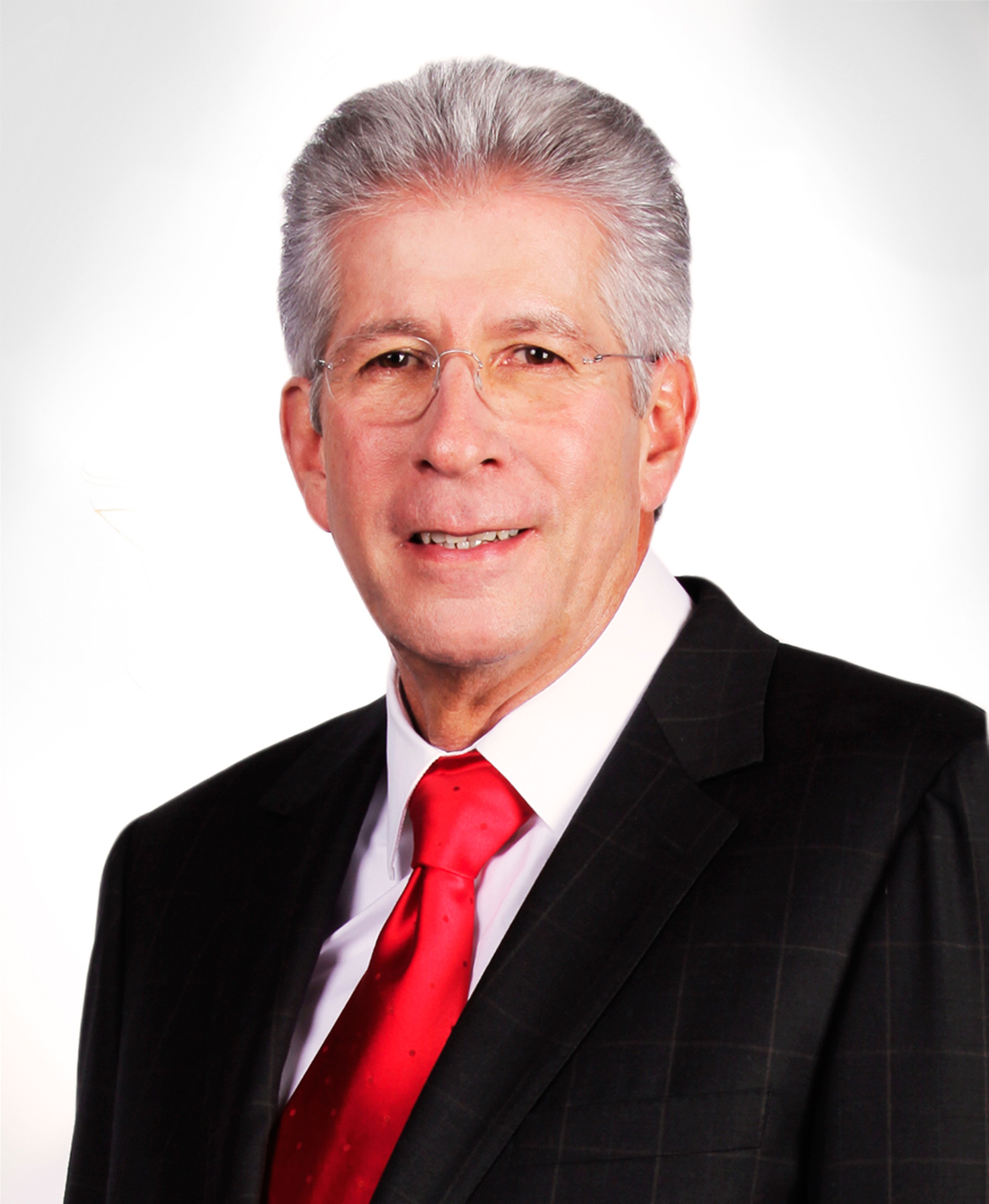

Secretary of Communications and Transportation
- In office December 1, 2012 – November 30, 2018
- President: Enrique Peña Nieto
- Preceded by: Dionisio Pérez-Jácome Friscione
- Succeeded by: Javier Jiménez Espriú

Personal details
- Born: 22 April 1949 Mexico City, Mexico
- Died: 1 April 2020 (aged 70) Mexico City, Mexico
- Party: Institutional Revolutionary Party
- Education: La Salle University (Mexico); Autonomous University of Mexico; University of Michigan, Ann Arbor
- Profession: Lawyer
- Ciudad de Mexico

Gerardo Ruiz Esparza (Spanish pronunciation: [xeˈɾaɾðo rwis esˈpaɾsa], April 22, 1949 – April 1, 2020), was a Mexican attorney and politician who served as the Secretary of Communications and Transportation in the cabinet of Enrique Peña Nieto.

== Early life ==
Born in Mexico City, Ruiz Esparza has a Bachelor of Laws degree from La Salle University, but he also attended Autonomous University of Mexico. After earning his law degree, he studied in the University of Michigan, Ann Arbor and received a master's degree in Comparative Law and Public Administration.

== Political career ==
Ruiz Esparza entered politics in 1981, first serving as State of Mexico's deputy secretary of state and secretary of governor. Prior to his deputy secretary role, he was the chief legal advisor of the State of Mexico's Finance Secretariat. From 1999 to 2005, Ruiz Esparza served as Director of Administration of the Federal Electricity Commission. When Enrique Peña Nieto was elected governor of State of Mexico, he chose Ruiz Esparza as Secretary of Communications in the State Government. When Nieto was elected president in 2012 election, Ruiz Esparza was named in the same position in the federal government.

== Personal life ==
Secretary Ruiz Esparza was married to Rocío Noriega Dosal, a teacher. The couple had two children, Karla and Gerardo. He died of a stroke on April 1, 2020.
