= Francisco Olvera Ruiz =

Mexican politician (born 1956)

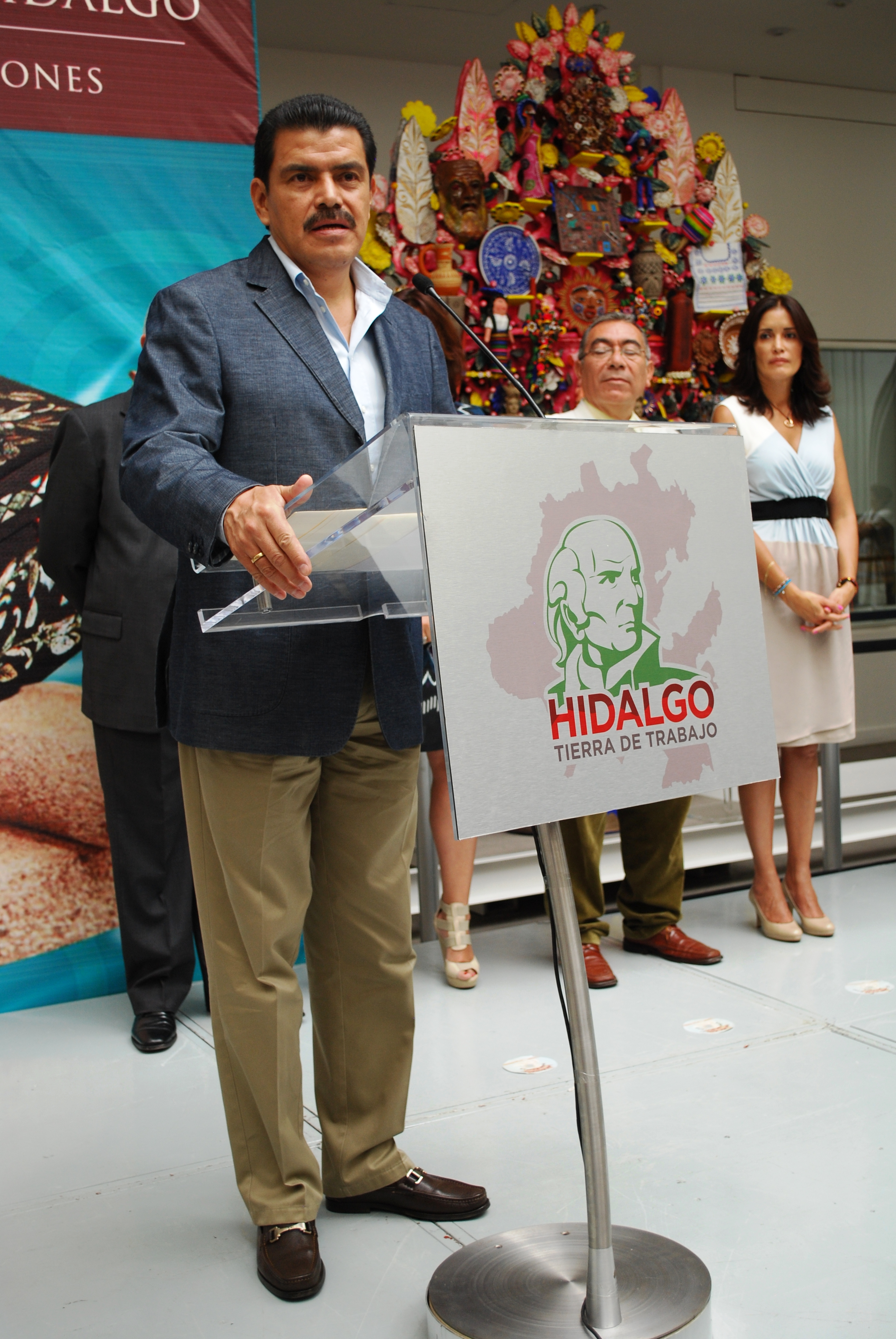

Governor of Hidalgo
- In office April 1, 2011 – September 5, 2016
- Preceded by: Miguel Ángel Osorio Chong
- Succeeded by: Omar Fayad

Municipal President of Pachuca
- In office January 18, 2009 – April 1, 2010
- Preceded by: Omar Fayad
- Succeeded by: Roberto Hernández

Personal details
- Born: June 15, 1956 (age 70) Pachuca, Hidalgo, Mexico
- Party: PRI
- Spouse: María Guadalupe Romero Delgado
- Education: Universidad Autónoma del Estado de Hidalgo

José Francisco Olvera Ruiz (born June 15, 1956) is a Mexican politician and a member of Institutional Revolutionary Party. He was Municipal president (Mayor) of Pachuca and from April 1, 2011, to September 5, 2016, served as Governor of Hidalgo.

== Biography ==
Francisco Olvera was born on June 15, 1956, in Pachuca de Soto, Hidalgo, He completed his studies in laws in the Universidad Autónoma de Hidalgo (English: Autonomous University of Hidalgo). He has a master's degree in public administration from the Instituto Tecnológico de Monterrey and the Universidad del Valle de México.

He's married with María Guadalupe Romero Delgado, and has two children, Francisco and Jorge Olvera Romero.

== Political career ==
He was Secretary of Government with the Governor Miguel Ángel Osorio Chong. He was a deputy in the Congress of Hidalgo from 2002 to 2005 for the I Distrito Electoral Local de Hidalgo (English: First local electoral district of Hidalgo); from 1999 to 2001 he served as legal coordinator; before, in 1995, he served as director of the general file of notaries in Hidalgo. He served for nine years as director of Cadastre in the entity.

=== Municipal President of Pachuca ===
Francisco Olvera took office as municipal president (mayor) of Pachuca on January 18, 2009. As mayor, he was a founding partner of the association of Municipalities of Hidalgo, association that is affiliated with the national federation of Municipalities of Mexico.

On April 10, 2010; the Attorney General of the Republic (Spanish: Procuraduría General de la República) started a preliminary investigation against him, to receive (according to the denunciation) more than 30 million of pesos from narcotrafico, primarily of Los Zetas group; for his campaign for mayor of Pachuca. The next day, Olvera ruled out any connection with organized crime, and after several investigations, charges against him were dismissed.

=== Governor Campaign ===
Francisco Olvera leave as mayor to run for the candidacy of Institutional Revolutionary Party (PRI) to the government of Hidalgo. On April 7, 2010; he became the candidate of the coalition “Unidos por tí” (English: Together for you), composed by (PRI), PVEM and New Alliance parties.

He won in the elections of July 4, 2010. He was appointed elect-governor on July 11.

In July 2010, coalition "Hidalgo nos Une" formally filed a complain to the electoral process, which sought to void the elections.

After analyzing the evidence presented by the parties, the Court decided to annul the vote in 32 boxes, the final votes of the election were 876,165. Hidalgo nos Une with its candidate Xóchitl Gálvez has 394,049 votes and Unidos por tí with Olvera has 438,094 votes

== See also ==
- State of Hidalgo
- List of Mexican state governors
- List of presidents of Pachuca Municipality

Preceded by Miguel Ángel Osorio Chong	Governor of Hidalgo; 2011–2017	Succeeded by Omar Fayad
