= Rubén Moreira Valdez =

Mexican politician (born 1963)

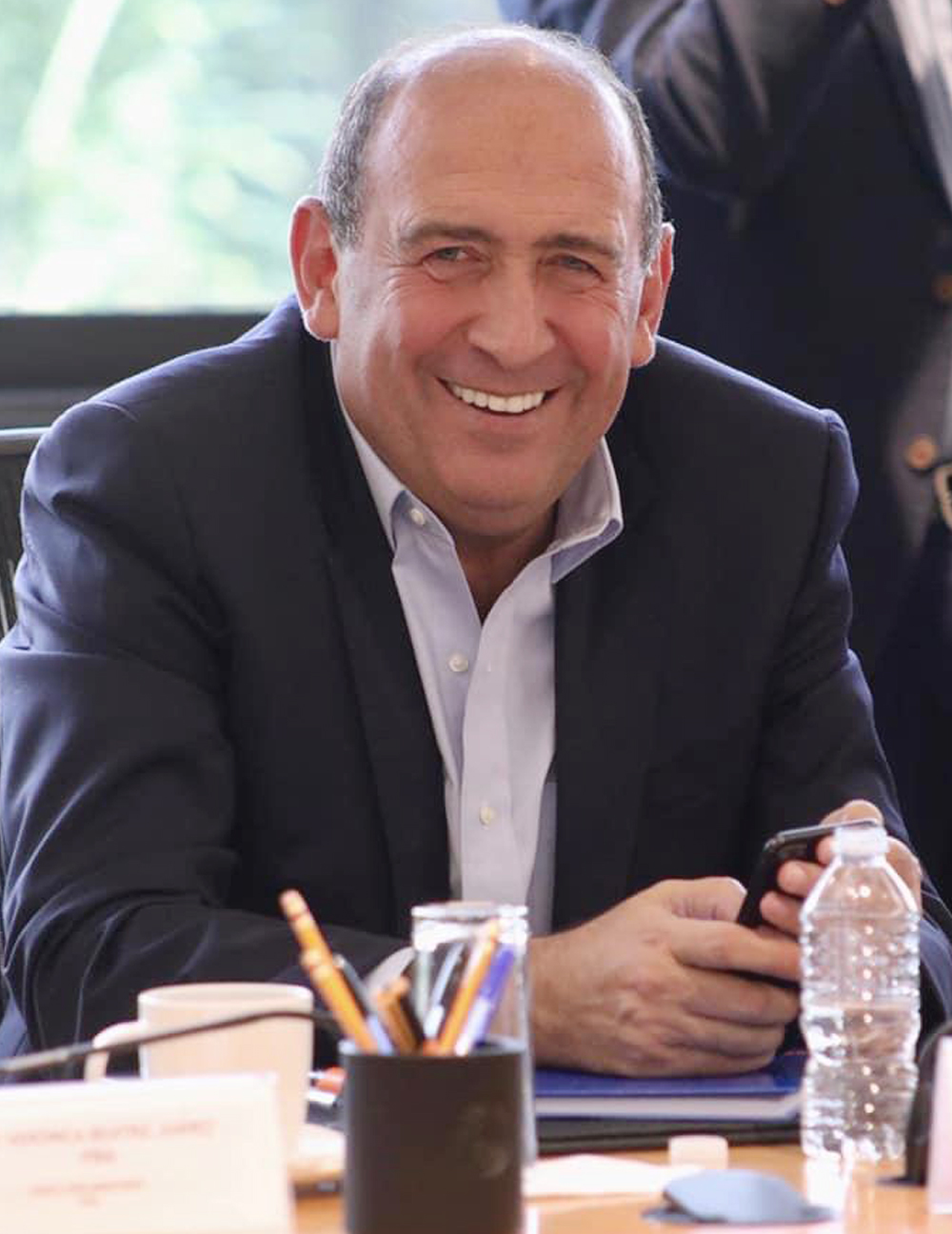

Governor of Coahuila
- In office 1 December 2011 – 30 November 2017
- Preceded by: Jorge Torres López
- Succeeded by: Miguel Ángel Riquelme Solís

Personal details
- Born: 18 April 1963 (age 63) Saltillo, Coahuila, Mexico
- Party: PRI
- Spouse: Alma Carolina Viggiano Austria
- Profession: politician, lawyer

Rubén Ignacio Moreira Valdez (born 18 April 1963) is a Mexican politician from the Institutional Revolutionary Party (PRI).

In the 2009 mid-terms, he was elected to the Chamber of Deputies for Coahuila's fourth district (Saltillo), obtaining more than 73% of the votes (the highest percentage of votes obtained in an electoral district at the national level).

In 2011, he was elected to a six-year term as governor of Coahuila. In 2018, he served as the general secretary of the PRI.

He returned to the Congress of the Union in the 2021 mid-terms as a plurinominal deputy and was re-elected in the 2024 general election.

== See also ==
- Elecciones estatales de Coahuila de 2011
