= Secretariat of Environment and Natural Resources =

Environmental ministry of the North American country

- Secretaría de Medio Ambiente y Recursos Naturales
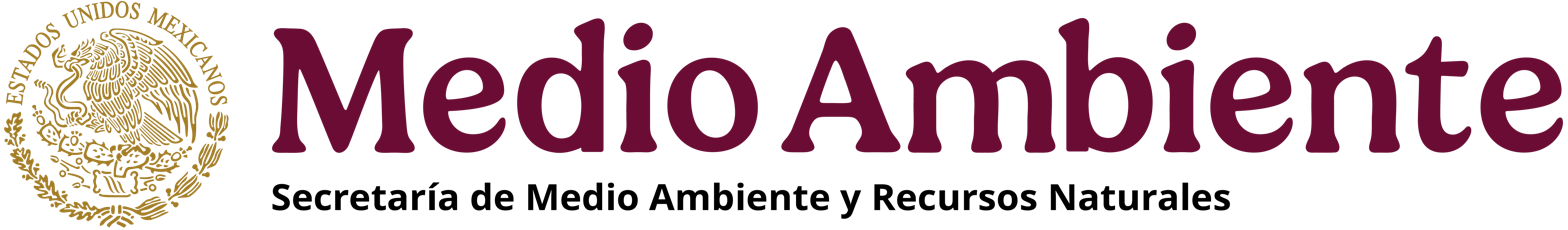

Agency overview
- Formed: November 30, 2000; 25 years ago
- Jurisdiction: Mexico
- Headquarters: Av. Ejército Nacional Mexicano 223, Anáhuac I Secc, Miguel Hidalgo, 11320 Mexico City
- Annual budget: ▲$70,245,482,469 MXN (2023)
- Agency executive: Alicia Barcena, Secretary
- Child agencies: Comisión Nacional del Agua; Procuraduría Federal de Protección al Ambiente; Instituto Nacional de Ecología y Cambio Climático; National Forestry Commission

The Secretariat of Environment and Natural Resources (in Spanish: Secretaría del Medio Ambiente y Recursos Naturales, SEMARNAT) is Mexico's environment ministry. Its head, the Secretary of the Environment and Natural Resources, is a member of the federal executive cabinet and is appointed by the President of Mexico. In September 2020, President Andrés Manuel López Obrador appointed María Luisa Albores González as Secretary of the Environment and Natural Resources, the third person to occupy the post since López Obrador became President less than two years earlier in December 2018.

The Secretariat is charged with the mission of protecting, restoring, and conserving the ecosystems, natural resources, and environmental services of Mexico with the goal of fostering sustainable development.

== Functions ==
The Secretariat of Environment and Natural Resources of México is the Secretary of State to which, according to Law of Federal Public Administration in its Article 32a, corresponds to the release of the following functions:

- Promote the protection, restoration and conservation of ecosystems, natural resources, goods and environmental services, to help monitor their use and ensure sustainable development.
- Develop and implement a national policy on natural resources, in such that the administration of such policy is not borne by state and local governments, nor by individuals and corporations.
- Promote environmental management within the national territory, in coordination with federal, state and municipal governments, and with participation from the private sector.
- Evaluate and providencie determination to the environmental impact statements for development projects submitted for public, social and private decision on the environmental risk studies, as well as programs for the prevention of accidents with ecological impact.
- Implement national policies on climate change and protection of the ozone layer.
- Direct work and studies on national meteorological, climatological, hydrological and geohydrological systems, and participate in international conventions on these subjects.
- Regulate and monitor the conservation of streams, lakes and lagoons of federal jurisdiction in protected watersheds, and protect the environment.

To carry out these functions, the Secretariat of Environment and Natural Resources has the following Undersecretaries:

- Undersecretary of Planning and Environmental Policy
- Undersecretary for Environmental Protection Management
- Undersecretary of Environmental Regulation
- Undersecretary of Finance of Mexico

These Undersecretaries are then charged with the operation of the following units of the SEMARNAT:

- National Water Commission
- National Institute in Ecology
- Federal Prosecutor Office for Environmental Protection
- National Commission of Natural Protected Areas
- National Forestry Commission
- Mexican Institute of Water Technology
- National Commission for the Knowledge and Use of Biodiversity

== List of secretaries ==
Secretary	Years of Appointment
Secretariat of Fisheries (SEPESCA)
Fernando Rafful Miguel	1982
Pedro Ojeda Paullada	1982–1988
María de los Angeles Moreno	1988–1991
Guillermo Jiménez Morales	1991–1994
Secretariat of the Environment, Natural Resources and Fisheries (SEMARNAP)
Julia Carabias Lillo	1994–2000
Secretariat of the Environment and Natural Resources (SEMARNAT)
Víctor Lichtinger	December 1, 2000 – June 23, 2003
Alberto Cárdenas Jiménez	June 23, 2003 – 2005
José Luis Luege Tamargo	2005–November 30, 2006
Juan Rafael Elvira Quezada	December 1, 2006 – November 30, 2012
Juan José Guerra Abud	December 1, 2012 – August 27, 2015
Rafael Pacchiano Alamán	August 27, 2015 – November 30, 2018
Josefa González Blanco Ortiz Mena	December 1, 2018 – May 25, 2019
Víctor Manuel Toledo	May 27, 2019 — September 2, 2020
María Luisa Albores	September 2, 2020 – 2024
Alicia Bárcena	October 1, 2024 – present

== See also ==
- National Forestry Commission of Mexico
