= 6th federal electoral district of Hidalgo =

Federal electoral district of Mexico

Hidalgo's 6th
- Electoral district of the Chamber of Deputies of Mexico

- 6th district since 2023

Incumbent
- Member: Ricardo Crespo Arroyo
- Party: ▌Morena
- Congress: 66th (2024–2027)

District
- State: Hidalgo
- Head town: Pachuca de Soto
- Coordinates: 20°6′N 98°45′W
- Covers: Pachuca, San Agustín Tlaxiaca, Ajacuba, Francisco I. Madero, Tlahuelilpan
- PR region: Fourth
- Precincts: 197
- Population: 440,567 (2020 census)

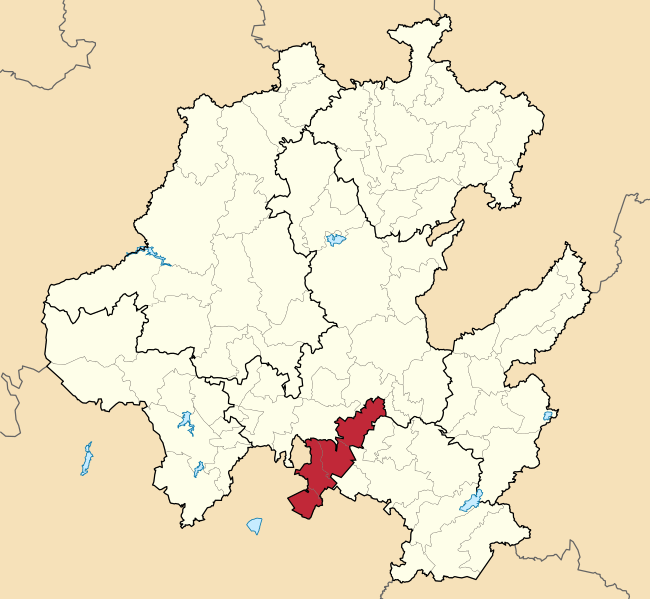
6th district in 2017–2022

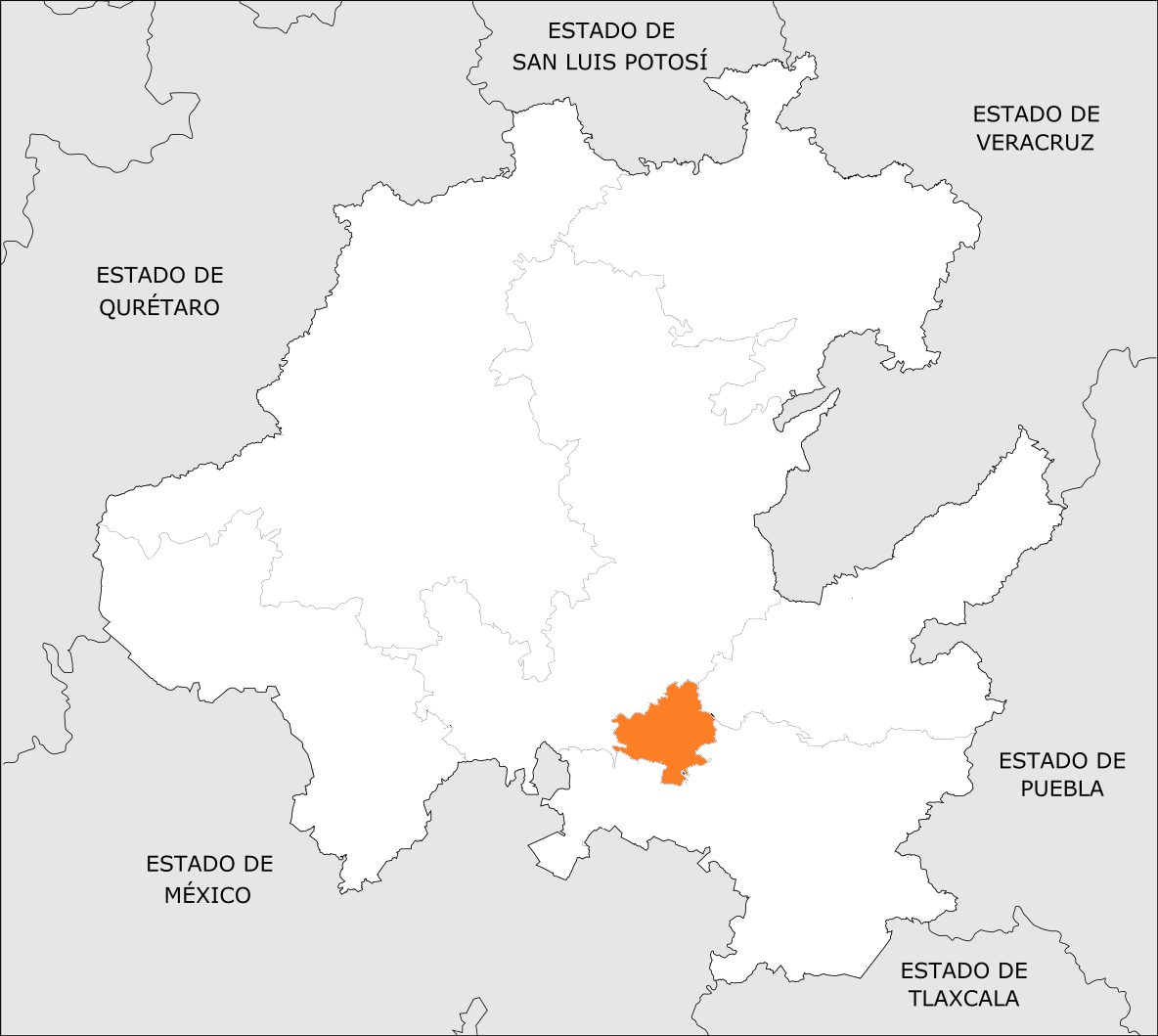
6th district in 2005–2017

The 6th federal electoral district of Hidalgo (Spanish: Distrito electoral federal 06 de Hidalgo) is one of the 300 electoral districts into which Mexico is divided for elections to the federal Chamber of Deputies and one of seven such districts in the state of Hidalgo.

It elects one deputy to the lower house of Congress for each three-year legislative period by means of the first-past-the-post system. Votes cast in the district also count towards the calculation of proportional representation ("plurinominal") deputies elected from the fourth electoral region. (Note: Between 2005 and 2023, Hidalgo was assigned to the fifth region.)

Suspended in 1943, the 6th district was re-established as part of the 1977 electoral reforms. Under the 1975 districting plan, Hidalgo only had five congressional districts; under the 1977 reforms, the number increased to six. The restored 6th district elected its first deputy, to the 51st Congress, in the 1979 mid-term election.

The current member for the district, elected in the 2024 general election, is Ricardo Crespo Arroyo of the National Regeneration Movement (Morena).

== District territory ==
Under the 2023 districting plan adopted by the National Electoral Institute (INE), which is to be used for the 2024, 2027 and 2030 federal elections, the 6th district covers 197 electoral precincts (secciones electorales) across a central portion of Hidalgo that includes the municipality of Pachuca and the municipalities of San Agustín Tlaxiaca, Ajacuba, Francisco I. Madero and Tlahuelilpan to the west.

The head town (cabecera distrital), where results from individual polling stations are gathered together and tallied, is the state capital, Pachuca de Soto. The district reported a population of 440,567 in the 2020 census.

== Previous districting schemes ==
Evolution of electoral district numbers
	1974	1978	1996	2005	2017	2023
Hidalgo	5	6	7	7	7	7
Chamber of Deputies	196	300				

Since 1996, the 6th district's various configurations have all been centred around Pachuca:

2017–2022

Under the 2017 plan, the district covered the municipalities of Pachuca, Tizayuca, Tolcayuca and Zapotlán de Juárez.

2005–2017

Between 2005 and 2017, it comprised the municipalities of Pachuca and Mineral de la Reforma.

1996–2005

The 1996 redistricting process created Hidalgo's 7th district. The 6th district covered the municipalities of Pachuca, Mineral de la Reforma, Mineral del Chico, Mineral del Monte and San Agustín Tlaxiaca.

1978–1996

The districting scheme in force from 1978 to 1996 was the result of the 1977 electoral reforms, which increased the number of single-member seats in the Chamber of Deputies from 196 to 300. Under that plan, Hidalgo's seat allocation rose from five to six. The re-established 6th district's head town was at Actopan and it covered 18 municipalities:
- Actopan, El Arenal, Atotonilco el Grande, Cardonal, Eloxochitlán, Huasca de Ocampo, Juárez Hidalgo, Metzquititlán, Metztitlán, Mineral del Chico, Mineral del Monte, Omitlan de Juárez, San Salvador, Santiago de Anaya, Tianguistengo, Tlahuiltepa, Xochicoatlán and Zacualtipán.

== Deputies returned to Congress ==
(Mexico) National parties
- Current
- PAN
- PRI
- PT
- PVEM
- MC
- Morena
- PAZ
- Somos
- Defunct or local only
- PLM
- PNR
- PRM
- PNM
- PP
- PPS
- PARM
- PFCRN
- CON
- PANAL
- PSD
- PES
- PES
- PRD

Hidalgo's 6th district
Election	Deputy	Party	Term	Legislature
1916	None		1916–1917	Constituent Congress of Querétaro
1917	Jesús Silva		1917–1918	27th Congress
1918	Aniceto Ortega de Villar		1918–1920	28th Congress
1920	Estanislao Olguín		1920–1922	29th Congress
1922	José Trinidad Cano		1922–1924	30th Congress
1924	Juvencio Nochebuena Palacios		1924–1926	31st Congress
1926	Honorato Austria		1926–1928	32nd Congress
1928	Honorato Austria		1928–1930	33rd Congress
1930	Otilio Villegas Lora	Institutional Revolutionary Party	1930–1932	34th Congress
1932	Otilio Villegas Lora	Institutional Revolutionary Party	1932–1934	35th Congress
1934	Salvador Mayorga	Institutional Revolutionary Party	1934–1937	36th Congress
1937	Leopoldo Badillo	Institutional Revolutionary Party	1937–1940	37th Congress
1940	Otilio Villegas Lora	Institutional Revolutionary Party	1940–1943	38th Congress
The 6th district was suspended between 1943 and 1978
1979	Manuel Rangel Escamilla	Institutional Revolutionary Party	1979–1982	51st Congress
1982	Antonio Ramírez Barrera	Institutional Revolutionary Party	1982–1985	52nd Congress
1985	Jesús Murillo Karam	Institutional Revolutionary Party	1985–1988	53rd Congress
1988	Rodolfo Ruiz Pérez Escobar	Institutional Revolutionary Party	1988–1991	54th Congress
1991	Juan Carlos Alva Calderón	Institutional Revolutionary Party	1991–1994	55th Congress
1994	Prisciliano Gutiérrez Hernández	Institutional Revolutionary Party	1994–1997	56th Congress
1997	Manuel Ángel Núñez Soto (Note: Núñez Soto took leave of his seat in 1998 to contend for the governorship of Hidalgo.); Lilia Reyes Morales	Institutional Revolutionary Party	1997–1998; 1998–2000	57th Congress
2000	Juan Manuel Sepúlveda Fayad	Institutional Revolutionary Party	2000–2003	58th Congress
2003	Miguel Ángel Osorio Chong (Note: Osorio Chong took leave of his seat in October 2004 to contend for the governorship of Hidalgo.); Alfredo Bejos Nicolás	Institutional Revolutionary Party	2003–2004; 2004–2006	59th Congress
2006	Daniel Ludlow Kuri (Note: Ludlow Kuri took leave of his seat on 9 September 2008 to run for mayor of Pachuca. During his absence he was replaced by his substitute, Sonia del Villar Sosa. He reassumed his seat in Congress after losing the election to Francisco Olvera Ruiz.)	National Action Party (Mexico)	2006–2009	60th Congress
2009	Carolina Viggiano Austria	Institutional Revolutionary Party	2009–2012	61st Congress
2012	Mirna Hernández Morales	Institutional Revolutionary Party	2012–2015	62nd Congress
2015	Alfredo Bejos Nicolás	Institutional Revolutionary Party	2015–2018	63rd Congress
2018	Lidia García Anaya	National Regeneration Movement	2018–2021	64th Congress
2021	Lidia García Anaya	National Regeneration Movement	2021–2024	65th Congress
2024	Ricardo Crespo Arroyo	National Regeneration Movement	2024–2027	66th Congress

== Presidential elections ==
Hidalgo's 6th district
Election	District won by	Party or coalition	%
2018	Andrés Manuel López Obrador	Juntos Haremos Historia	59.0106
2024	Claudia Sheinbaum Pardo	Sigamos Haciendo Historia	61.4854
