= Alfredo Bejos Nicolás =

Mexican politician (born 1960)

- Born: 9 April 1960 (age 66); Pachuca, Hidalgo, Mexico
- Occupation: Politician
- Political party: Institutional Revolutionary Party

Alfredo Bejos Nicolás (born 9 April 1960) is a Mexican politician affiliated with the Institutional Revolutionary Party. He represented the sixth district of Hidalgo in the Chamber of Deputies of the LXIII Legislature of the Mexican Congress (2015–2018).

== Life ==
Bejos received his degree in dentistry from the Universidad Autónoma del Estado de Hidalgo and joined the PRI in 1988. For twenty years, from 1984 to 2004, Bejos had a dental practice.

In the 1990s, Bejos's political career began in earnest. He presided over the Political Forum of Professionals and Technicians for the Hidalgo state chapter of the Confederación Nacional de Organizaciones Populares from 1994 to 1998. In 1997, he became a city councilor in Pachuca, simultaneously serving on municipal development and planning committees. Between 1999 and 2000, Bejos headed the PRI in Pachuca.

=== Legislative career ===
The early 2000s began Bejos's turn toward legislative activity. He became a state and national political councilor, as well as the secretary general of the CNOP in Hidalgo, in 2002; he also briefly served as a state-level regional coordinator for the state Secretary of Social Development. A year later, he became an alternate legislator in the Chamber of Deputies for the LIX. The next year, however, the primary legislator he backed up, Miguel Ángel Osorio Chong, opted to permanently resign to pursue a bid for Governor of Hidalgo. When he won the elections, Bejos closed his dental practice and became his permanent replacement, serving on two commissions: Health, and Environment and Natural Resources.

After his first term in the Chamber of Deputies ended, Bejos made a brief return to the state government as a state-level regional coordinator for the Secretary of Planning and Regional Development, but he left this post in 2007 in preparation for a successful bid to become a local deputy in the LX Legislature of the Congress of Hidalgo. In his three-year term, he was president of the First Permanent Commission of Industry, Commerce and Services, and he also was a secretary on similar commissions for health and tourism. From 2011 to 2013, Bejos directed the College of Scientific and Technological Studies of the State of Hidalgo (CECYTEH); simultaneously, from 2012 to 2013, he served as secretary general of the national council of such organizations, CONCECyTER.

In 2013, voters returned Bejos to the Hidalgo state congress, this time in its LXII Legislature. He presided over the First Permanent Commission of Education and sat on commissions dealing with tourism and the budget. His time in the state legislature was marked by general inactivity; he did not introduce any bills and only signed two economic agreements. In addition, between 2014 and 2015, Bejos served in the state government as the Secretary of Tourism and Culture.

Bejos left both posts in 2015 in order to run for the Chamber of Deputies for the LXIII Legislature. He serves as a secretary on the Metropolitan Development Commission and sits on four others: Jurisdictional, Federal District, Third Work Commission, and Tourism.
