= Lilia Reyes Morales =

Mexican politician

- Born: Hidalgo, Mexico
- Occupation: Politician
- Political party: PRI

Lilia Reyes Morales (Note: In this Mexican name, the surname is Reyes and the second or maternal family name is Morales.) is a Mexican politician affiliated with the Institutional Revolutionary Party (PRI).

Reyes Morales has served as an alternate representative in both chambers of Congress: in the Chamber of Deputies during the 57th Congress (1998–2000), as the replacement of Manuel Ángel Núñez Soto, the member for Hidalgo's 6th district who resigned his seat to contend successfully for the governorship of Hidalgo; and in the Senate during the 59th Congress (2003–2006), as the replacement of Senator for Hidalgo Ernesto Gil Elorduy.
