= Elorduy =

Elorduy is a Spanish surname. Notable people with the surname include:

- Carmelo Elorduy (1901–1989), Spanish Sinologist
- Eugenio Elorduy Walther (1940–2023), Mexican politician
- Iñigo Vicente Elorduy (born 1998), Spanish professional footballer
- José Ernesto Gil Elorduy (1943–2026), Mexican politician
- Juan Elorduy (1888–1977), Spanish footballer
