= Berta Zerón =

Mexican aviator

Berta Zerón de García (June 23, 1924 - December 2000) was the first woman in Mexico to obtain a Commercial Pilot's License and an Unlimited Public Transport License. She was the first woman to pilot a jet airplane, participate in international air races, and become a skydiver.

Zerón received two "Emilio Carranza" medals: the first for being the first Mexican woman to obtain her TPI license and the second for reaching 10,000 flight hours. She was an active member of the "99's", the Women's Pilot Association founded by Amelia Earhart.

== Biography ==
Berta Zerón was born in the city of Pachuca, Hidalgo. When she was 11, she went to Honolulu, Hawaii, with her father, where she learned English and received her first formal schooling. Returning to Mexico two years later, Berta discovered an airplane belonging to Amelia Earheart on the ship upon which they were travelling. The discovery of the airplane was something that stayed with Berta for many years.

After returning to Mexico, Zerón completed her high school education, graduating as a bilingual secretary. She went to work for the Canada Dry and Ericsson companies and later obtained a position at a money exchange business located at the Mexico City International Airport.

At the airport she met a pilot named Capitan Meraz, who became the first person to invite her for a flight. She turned down the invitation, however, because the airplane they were to fly did not inspire much confidence in her. Later in life Zerón admitted her regret at not having taken the opportunity.

A short time later she was offered a position in the operations department at Servicios Aéreos. Zerón's answer was an immediate yes, since it allowed her to be near the hangar and to fly in the company's aircraft as an observer.

She was transferred from the operations department to the ticketing department, located outside the airport. This move forced her to submit her resignation.

A few years went by before she decided to take her first steps to become a pilot. Zerón applied for her permit for flight practices in 1947. She completed her first official flight on 13 July 1947, with a duration of 45 minutes, covering the route Pachuca - Mexico City.

Her first solo took place in 1964, thanks to the support of Capitan Francisco López, who owned a Cessna 170 (XB-GEW) and who provided her with the opportunity to fly at a cost of 100 pesos an hour. She obtained her Private Pilot's License (#4645) in January 1965, logging 200 hours in the Cessna 170.

Not stopping at just her private license, she soon learned to fly twin engine airplanes, instrument and night flying skills, became familiar with a Beechcraft Baron 55, and practiced aerobatic flight in a PT-17 Stearman belonging to the "Escuela de Aviación México."

With 282 flying hours logged, she was awarded Commercial Aviator License number 2525 in June 1966, and she began working for the "Aviones, S.A." company as a flight instructor on Cessna 150s.

Always looking upwards, she was soon intrigued by parachute jumping and began training at the "Club de Paracaidismo Deportivo, A.C." where she logged 5 static and 13 free jumps. For this feat she was awarded a decoration during the first International Parachute Jump Competition in Acapulco, Guerrero, since she was the first woman trained by that club.

A year after her parachute jumping experiences, she took part for the first time in an aerial race covering the route Mexico-Guadalajara, flying a Cessna 150 (XB-PAN) where she finished in third place, being the only woman participating in the race.

In 1969, after taking part in other races and traveling on Cessnas 411, 320, 401 and 421, she left Aviones, S.A. to work for Escuela Aeronáutica Mexicana, again as a flight instructor. During July of that same year, when she was competing in one of the most important events in the United States, the "Powder Puff Derby", an annual competition for women only, she made it 56 out of 92 competitors, flying a Mooney with registration N-7455. The competition took place between San Diego and Washington. In 1971 together with her co-pilot, Noemi Mondragon, participated in the "Angel Derby" that started in Columbus, Ohio, USA, and ended in Managua, Nicaragua.

Her next move was to work for "Commander Mexicana" as an executive pilot and flight instructor, flying the Commander Lark and the Commander Shrike twins, while at the same time training on the Douglas DC-3 and Beechcraft Twin Bonanza, at the "Centro Internacional de Adiestramiento de Aviación Civil ( CIAAC)".

She immediately began to fly the Turbo Commander 680 and 681 and also obtained her Unlimited Public Transport Pilot License, which was the first license of its type to be obtained by a woman in Mexico.

By having a transport pilot license in her hands, she was awarded her first 'Emilio Carranza' medal. She added on to this by becoming qualified to fly the Rockwell Sabreliners, becoming first officer on the Sabre 40 (XA-APD) at "Commander Mexicana," and thus becoming the first woman to occupy that rank in an executive jet airplane.

Zerón's ultimate goal however, was to work for an airline. She left Commander Mexicana and applied for employment with the then called "Aeronaves de Mexico,". The airline always had an excuse for not hiring her. Since they could not reject her based on her training, piloting abilities and mastery of the English language, she was told "you will retire in 15 years and thus, you will not be able to return the investment made in your training."

At that time, the presence of a woman as a pilot in an airline was not the norm. If hired by the airline, Bertga Zerón would have achieved yet another first for Mexican women pilots.

This incident did not have any harmful effects on her career, since she continued with her training and in 1982, flying a C-182 she won the first place in an aerial race Mexico -Pachuca - Querétaro - Atizapan.

She was also honored by becoming the first woman to be awarded the 'Silver Icarus', as the most outstanding person in aviation in 1973, and after this she also became the precursor in her gender, by flying an officially operated aircraft, a Beech Baron 55.

In 1978 she was awarded for the second time the "Emilio Carranza" medal, upon reaching 10,000 flight hours. Her trips as a pilot ended on January 9, 1996 flying a Cessna 206.

Her years of experience in the skies, allowed her to pilot over 46 different types of airplanes, including the military T-33, to participate in 2 parachuting championships, and in 8 air races.

Berta Zerón de Garcí died December 2000.

"PARA MI LA AVIACION ES MI RAZON DE VIVIR, ES TODA MI VIDA."

"FOR ME, AVIATION IS MY REASON FOR LIVING, IT IS MY WHOLE LIFE."

Berta Zerón
