= List of municipal presidents of Pachuca =

The following is a list of municipal presidents of the municipality of Pachuca in the Mexican state of Hidalgo. The municipality includes the city of Pachuca.

== List of officials ==
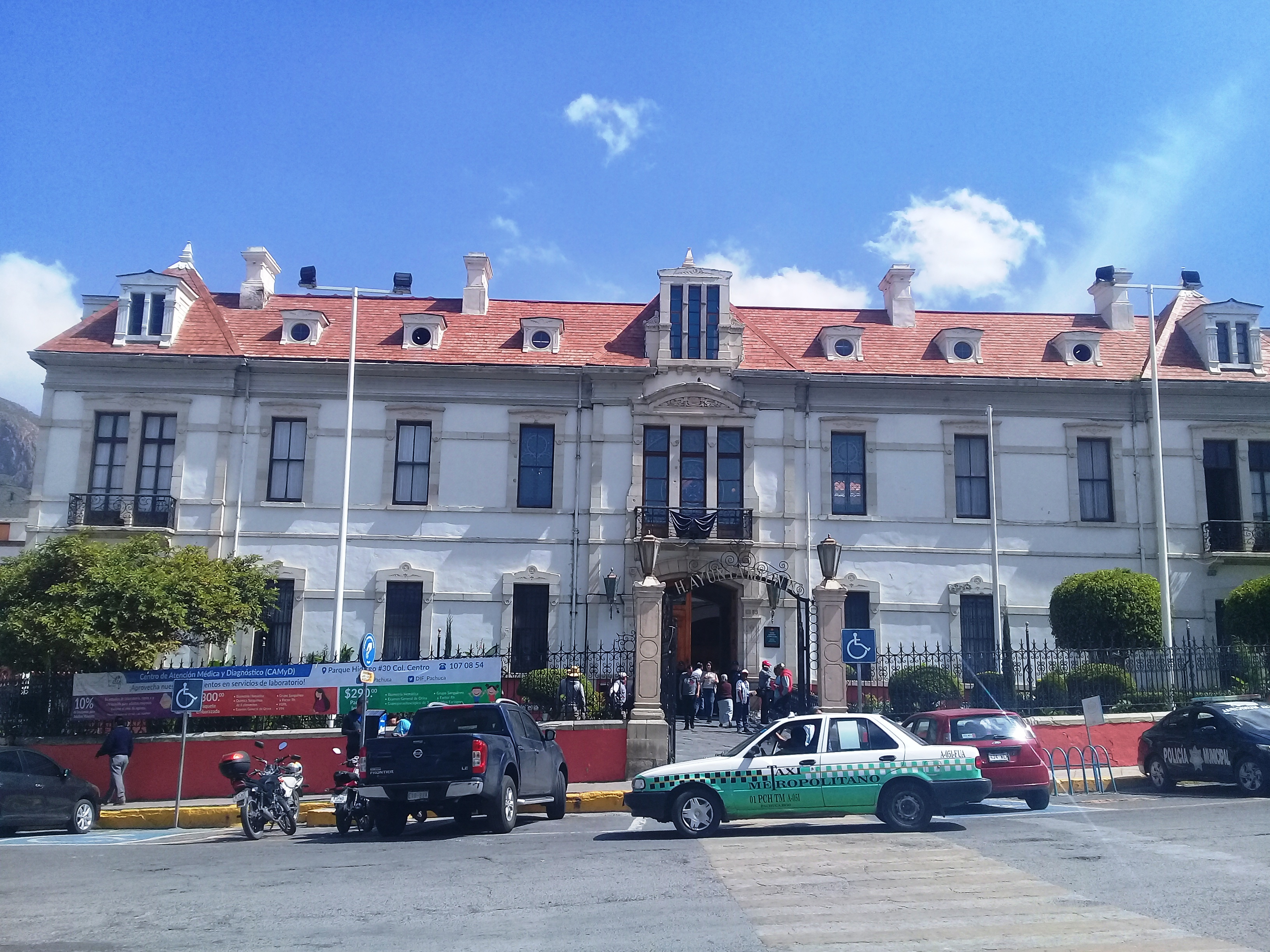
Palacio Municipal, Pachuca (photo 2019)

- Humberto Velasco A., 1964-1967
- Darío Pérez González, 1967-1970
- Rafael Cravioto Núñez, 1970-1973
- Gabriel Romero Reyes, 1973-1976
- Luis Fuentes Núñez, 1976-1979
- Ladislao Castillo Feregrino, 1979-1982
- Eduardo Valdespino Furlong, 1982-1985
- Ernesto Gil Elorduy, 1985-1988
- Adalberto Chávez Bustos, 1988-1991
- Mario Viornery Mendoza, 1991-1993
- Rafael Arriaga Paz, 1993-1997
- Juan Manuel Sepulveda Fayad, 1997-2000
- José Antonio Tellería Beltrán, 2000-2003
- Alberto Meléndez Apodaca, 2003-2006
- Omar Fayad, 2006-2009
- Francisco Olvera Ruiz, 2009-2010
- Roberto Hernández Mares, 2010 (interim)
- Geraldina García Gordillo, 2010-2012
- Eleazar García Sánchez, 2012-2015
- Yolanda Tellería Beltrán, 2016-current

== See also ==
- Hidalgo state election, 2018
- Pachuca history
- History of Pachuca
