= Pachuca Municipality =

Coordinates: 20°07′N 98°44′W

Pachuca
- Municipality
- Coat of arms

- Country: Mexico
- State: Hidalgo
- Municipal seat: Pachuca de Soto

Government
  - Municipal President: Eleazar García Sánchez
  - Federal electoral district: Hidalgo's 6th

Population
  - Total: 267 862
- Time zone: UTC-6 (Zona Centro)

The municipality of Pachuca de Soto, or municipality of Pachuca, is one of the municipalities of the state of Hidalgo, located in east-central Mexico.

The municipal seat is the city of Pachuca de Soto. The municipality of Pachuca is increasingly co-extensive with the metropolitan area of Pachuca, as development has grown to cover over 60% of the geographic open space. That has eliminated much of the municipality's native flora diversity and larger fauna.

== Geography ==
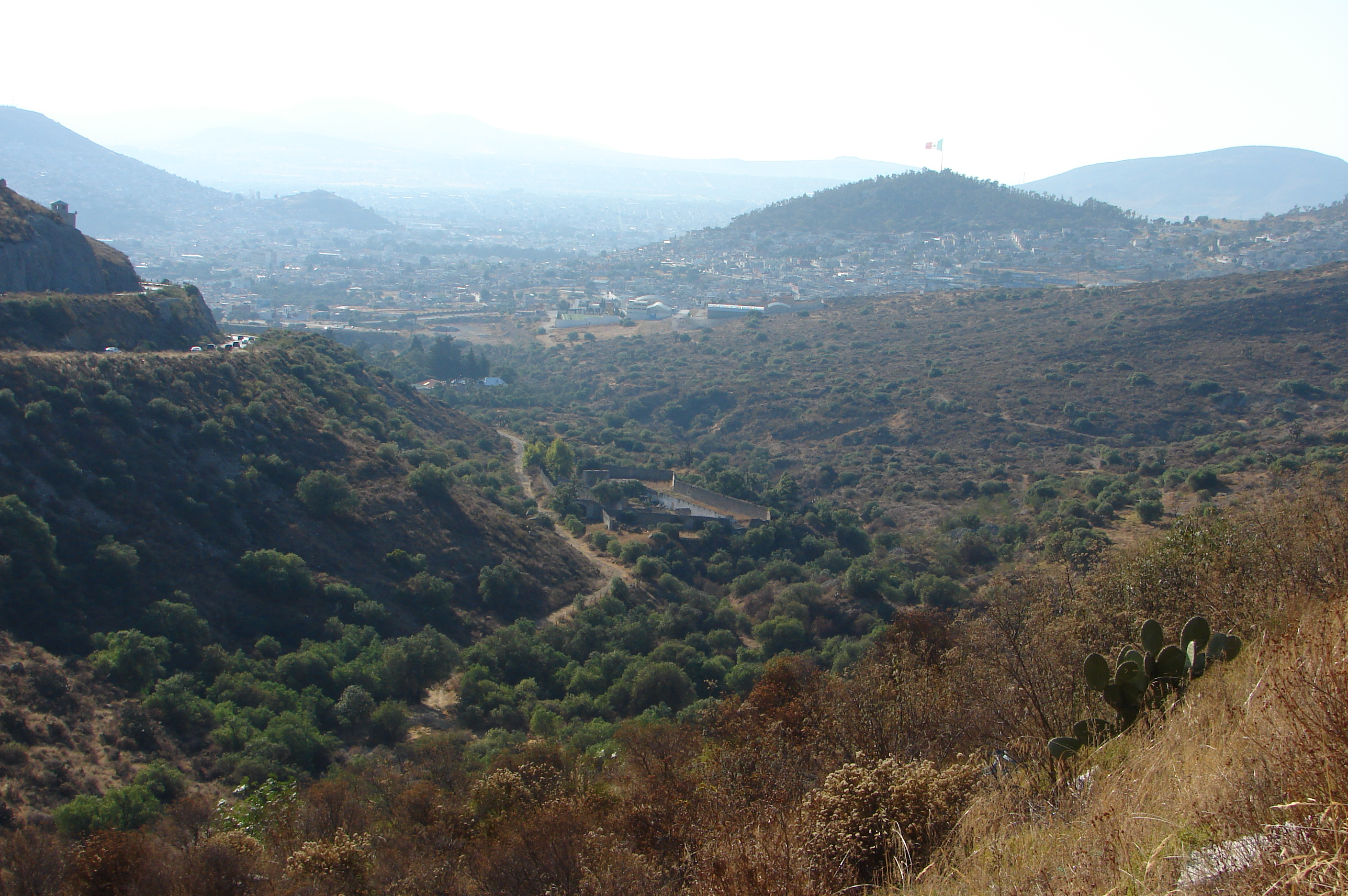
Panorama of Pachuca city and municipality.

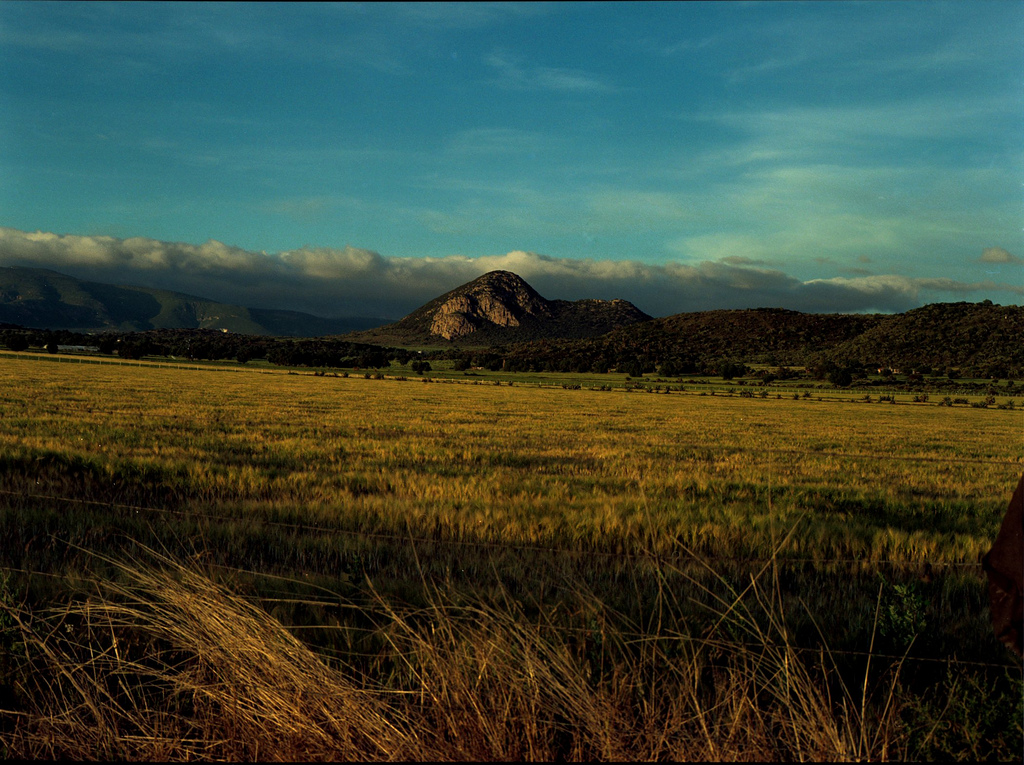
Pachuca-Tizayuca Valley, in the Municipality of Pachuca.

The location of the municipality is north of the state of Mexico, and is located in the low extreme geographical coordinates of Greenwich, north latitude 20º01'23", 20º12'28" maximum, west longitude 98°41'30" minimum, 98°52'35" maximum. The Municipality of Pachuca has a territory of 195,300 square kilometres (75,400 sq mi) and borders the municipalities of Mineral del Chico, Mineral del Monte, Zempoala, Zapotlán de Juárez, Mineral de la Reforma, Epazoyucan, and San Agustín Tlaxiaca.

=== Natural features ===
The municipality is located in rugged hill and mountain terrains, and varies in altitude between 2,400–2,800 metres (7,900–9,200 ft) above sea level. It is located on the Trans-Mexican Volcanic Belt (Eje Volcánico Transversal, Sierra Nevada) mountain ranges system. The only major level terrain is where the historic center of Pachuca city is located. Notable mountains are the Cerro del Cuixi, the Cerro de San Cristóbal, and the Cerro de Cubitos.

Rivers that cross through the municipality are the Actopan, the Amajac and the Tezontepec Rivers. The climate is temperate and relatively cold with strong winds during eight to nine months out of the year. These can reach speeds of 60–65 km an hour.

== Economy ==
64% of the municipality of Pachuca is a developed urban area. Agriculture is nearly a non-existent factor in the economy, as the small-scale farming and livestock raising in the hills is for family or local consumption.

=== Industry ===
Despite its decline in the 20th century, mining still continues to be an important element of Pachuca's economy. Pachuca still produces more than 60% of the state's gold and more than 50% of its silver.

The manufacturing sector was established in the 1950s and has been steadily growing, changing the city's traditional mining image. Some of the major industrial employers are Applied Power de México (automotive parts), BARROMEX (machinery), Herramientas Cleveland (machinery and tools) and Embotelladora la Minera (soft drinks). The city also contains over 800 smaller manufacturing enterprises.

The municipality's economy also has a large commercial sector, with numerous stores and thirteen public markets. It is also the wholesale center for foodstuffs for most of the state.

=== Tourism ===
Despite all the changes in the 20th century, the historic center of Pachuca has maintained its colonial provincial feel. This has led the municipality and city to promote it as a tourist attraction.

The Mina de Acosta is a mine, and an open-air and subterranean mining museum, adjacent to Pachuca in the village of Real del Monte in the municipality. It is still active, but barely as for each ton and a half of ore extracted, only 200 grams of silver and 2 grams of gold are obtained. Guided tours show how ore is extracted from the mine, at depths up to 500 metres (1,600 ft).

== Demography ==
According to the 2005 census, the municipality of Pachuca de Soto had 275,578 inhabitants. The municipality contains fifteen other communities, with all but two having less than 1,500 people according to the 2005 INEGI census.

Only three percent of the municipality's population lives outside the Pachuca city boundaries. The majority of the residents are Roman Catholic, but there is a significant percentage of Protestants, mostly descendants of English miners.

=== Populated places in Pachuca ===
Town	Population
Total	267,862
Pachuca de Soto	256,584
Santiago Tlapacoya	3362
San Miguel Cerezo	1981
El Huixmí	2567

Settlements in the municipality of Pachuca include:

- Barrio del Judío
- La Rabia
- El Comal
- El Bordo (Barrio del Bordo)

== See also ==
- History of the Pachuca region
- Climate of the Pachuca region
