= Mirna Hernández =

Mexican politician (born 1961)

Mirna Esmeralda Hernández
- Born: 3 August 1961 (age 64); Hidalgo, Mexico
- Occupation: Deputy
- Political party: PRI

Mirna Esmeralda Hernández Morales (born 3 August 1961) is a Mexican politician affiliated with the Institutional Revolutionary Party (PRI). In 2012–2015 she served as a federal deputy in the 62nd Congress, representing Hidalgo's sixth district.
