= Carmelo Elorduy =

Spanish Sinologist (1901–1989)

Carmelo Elorduy, S.J. (25 January 1901 – 1 September 1989) was a Spanish Sinologist. Elorduy was born in Mungia and his first trip to China was in 1926, when he worked at the Jesuit mission located in Wuhu City, Anhui. He returned to Spain in 1932 to finish his degree in theology and philosophy, and to become a Jesuit priest. He returned to China in 1934 and remained there until 1951 when he moved to Macao and in the following year to Taichung. For health reasons he moved back to Spain in 1959; while resting in Oña and encouraged by his brother Eleuterio, he began translating some texts of the Chinese classics. Most of his translations were the first to be done directly from Classical Chinese into the Spanish language.

== Works ==
- La gnosis taoísta del Tao Te Ching. Facultad de Teología, Oña, 1961.
- Chuang-tzu. Literato, filósofo y místico taoísta. East Asian Pastoral Institute, Manila, 1967.
- Chuang-tzu. Literato, filósofo y místico taoísta. Monte Ávila Editores, Caracas, 1972.
- Humanismo político oriental. Editorial B. A. C. (Biblioteca de Autores Cristianos), Madrid, 1967.
- Lao Tse / Chuang Tzu: Dos grandes maestros del taoísmo. Editora Nacional, Madrid, 1977.
- Lao Tse, Tao Te Ching. Historia del Pensamiento, Ed. Virgilio Ortega, Ediciones Orbis, Barcelona, 1984.
- Libro de los Cambios. Editora Nacional, Madrid, 1983.
- Moti. Política del amor universal. Editorial Tecnos, Madrid, 1987.
- Odas selectas del Romancero chino. Monte Ávila Editores, Caracas, 1974.
- Romancero chino. Editora Nacional, Madrid, 1984.
- Sesenta y cuatro conceptos de la ideología taoísta. Instituto de Investigaciones Históricas de la Universidad Andrés Bello, Caracas, 1972.
- Tao Te Ching. Lao-tse. Ed. Tecnos, Madrid, 1996.
