= Ernesto Gil Elorduy =

Mexican politician (1943–2026)

- Born: 18 September 1943; Mexico City, Mexico
- Died: 22 January 2026 (aged 82)
- Occupation: Politician
- Political party: PRI

José Ernesto Gil Elorduy (Note: In this Mexican name, the surname is Gil and the second or maternal family name is Elorduy.) (18 September 1943 – 22 January 2026) was a Mexican politician affiliated with the Institutional Revolutionary Party (PRI).

== Life and career ==
Gil Elorduy was born in Mexico City in 1943. Early in his political career he was private secretary to President Luis Echeverría.

He served in the Chamber of Deputies during the 51st Congress (1979–1982, for Hidalgo's 2nd) and 55th Congress (1991–1994, for Hidalgo's 3rd) and in the Senate during the 58th and 59th Congresses (2000–2006) representing Hidalgo.

He was elected municipal president of Pachuca, Hidalgo, for the 1985–1988 term and also served as a local deputy in the 57th Congress of Hidalgo in 1999. (Note: See es:Anexo:LVII Legislatura del Congreso de Hidalgo.) He served a second term in the Congress of Hidalgo in 2013–2016. (Note: See es:Anexo:LXII Legislatura del Congreso de Hidalgo.)

Gil Elorduy died on 22 January 2026, at the age of 82.
