= Daniel Ludlow Kuri =

Mexican politician

- Born: 10 August 1961 (age 64)
- Occupation: Politician
- Political party: PAN

Lorenzo Daniel Ludlow Kuri (born 10 August 1961) is a Mexican politician affiliated with the National Action Party. As of 2014 he served as Deputy of the LX Legislature of the Mexican Congress representing Hidalgo.
