= Sonia del Villar Sosa =

Mexican politician (born 1972)

- Born: 8 September 1972 (age 53); Hidalgo, Mexico
- Occupation: Politician
- Political party: PAN

Sonia Leslie del Villar Sosa (born 8 September 1972) is a Mexican politician from the National Action Party. From 2008 to 2009 she served as Deputy of the LX Legislature of the Mexican Congress representing Hidalgo.
