= Pachuca =

Capital and largest city of Hidalgo, Mexico

Pachuca Nju̱nthe (Mezquital Otomi)
- City
- Pachuca de Soto
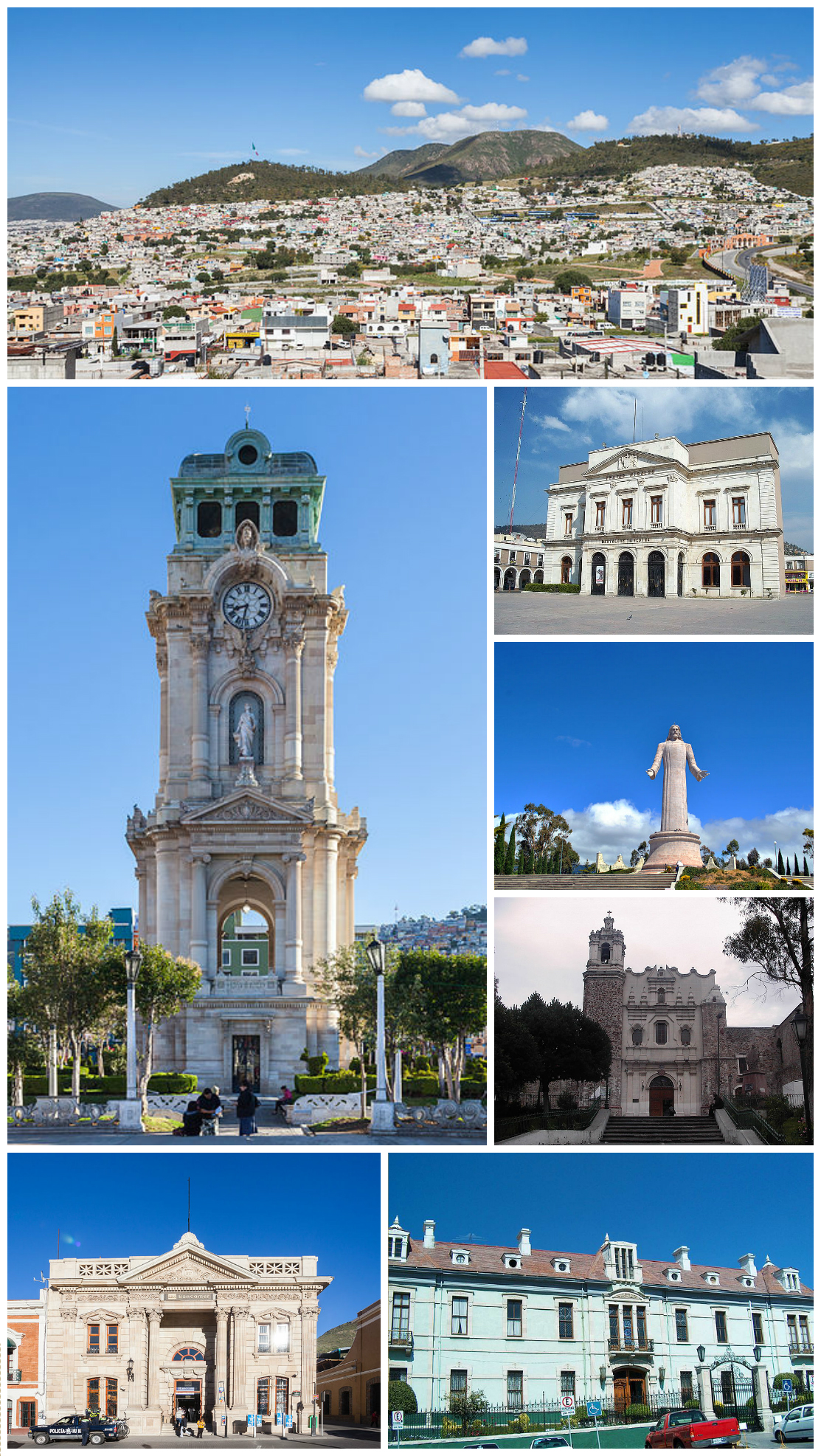
- Left:Panorama view of Pachuca, including Lobo Hills, Los Chavez, from Cubitos Ecological Park, Pachuca Monument Clock Tower, Pachuca Bancomer heritage building, Right:Medina Hidalgo Bartolomé Teather (Teatro Hidalgo Bartolomé de Medina), Christ King of Pachuca (Cristo Ray de Pachuca), Pachuca Saint Francis of Assisi Monastery, Pachuca Municipal Palace (Palacio Municipal de Pachuca)

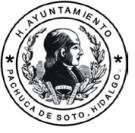
- Seal Coat of arms
- Nickname: La Bella Airosa (The Windy Beauty)
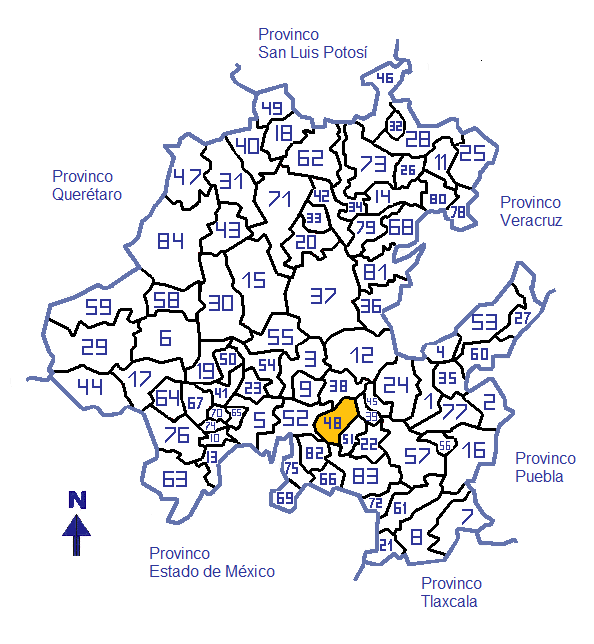
- Location of Pachuca Municipality within Hidalgo

- Location within Mexico
- Coordinates: 20°6′N 98°45′W
- Country: Mexico
- State: Hidalgo
- Municipality: Pachuca

Government
  - Type: Ayuntamiento
  - Municipal President: Jorge Reyes Hernández (Morena)
  - Federal electoral district: Hidalgo's 6th

Area
  - City: 60 km^{2} (23 sq mi)
- Elevation: 2,432 m (7,979 ft)

Population (2020)
  - City: 297,848 (Note: 141,549 men and 156,299 women)
  - Density: 5,730/km^{2} (14,850/sq mi)
  - Metro: 665,929
  - Seat: 256,584
- Time zone: UTC-6 (Zona Centro)
- Website: www.pachuca.gob.mx

Pachuca (Spanish pronunciation: [paˈtʃuka]; Mezquital Otomi: Nju̱nthe), formally known as Pachuca de Soto, is the capital and largest city of the east-central Mexican state of Hidalgo, located in the south-central part of the state. Pachuca de Soto is also the name of the municipality for which the city serves as municipal seat. Pachuca is located about 90 kilometres (56 mi) north of Mexico City via Mexican Federal Highway 85.

There is no agreed upon consensus regarding the origins of the word pachuca. It has been loosely traced to pachoa ('strait', 'opening'), pachoacan ('place of government', 'place of silver and gold') and patlachuican ('place of factories', 'place of tears').

The official name of Pachuca is Pachuca de Soto in honor of congressman Manuel Fernando Soto, who is credited with the founding of Hidalgo state. Its nickname of La Bella Airosa ("the airy, beautiful") comes from the strong winds that blow through the canyons to the north of the city. In the indigenous Otomi language, Pachuca is known as Nju̱nthe. The area had been long-inhabited; and is famous for mining, both for green obsidian which was highly prized by Pre-Columbian civilizations and was traded as far as Spiro Mounds in the United States; and for later mining activity overseen by the Spanish in the mid-16th century.

Pachuca remained a major mining center until the mid-20th century, with the city's fortunes fluctuating with the health of the mining sector. In the mid-20th century, a major downturn in mining pushed the city to shift focus from mining to industry, resulting in the revamping of the Universidad Autónoma de Hidalgo. Today, mining forms only a fraction of the municipality's economy. One cultural aspect that makes Pachuca unique is the influence of the Cornish miners who immigrated in the 19th century from Great Britain, as many of their descendants remain in Pachuca, and nearby Real del Monte. Furthermore, the Cornish populace helped to shape two local traditions that define the city—fútbol and a dish called "pastes."

== History ==
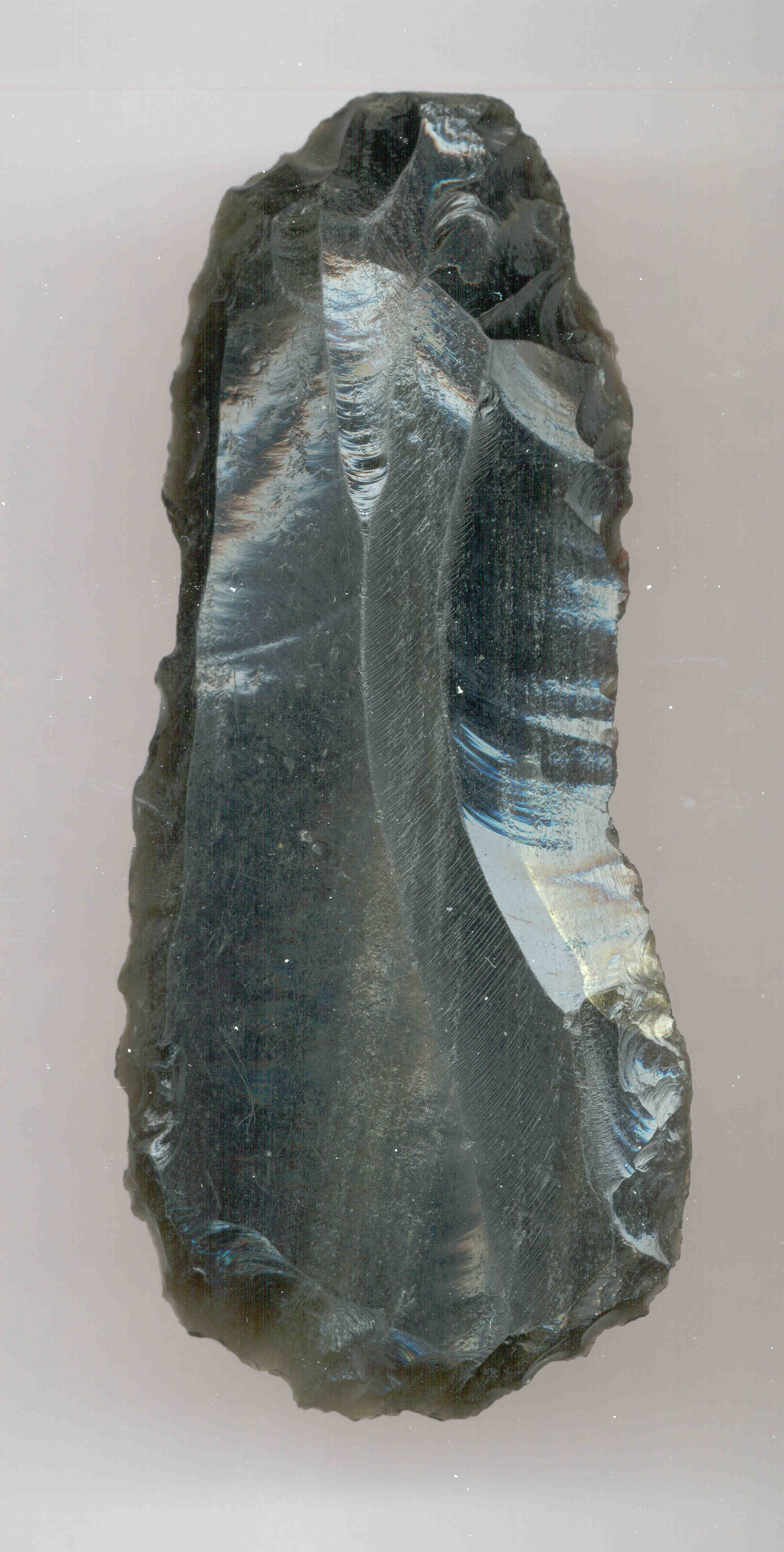
Scraper found at Spiro Mounds, Oklahoma, made with green obsidian sourced from Pachuca, Mexico

Evidence of early human habitation in this area is found in Cerro de las Navajas and Zacualtipán, in the Sierra de Pachuca. Here primitive mines to extract green obsidian, arrow heads, scraping tools, and mammoth remains can be traced back as far as 12,000 BCE. An ancient pre-Hispanic obsidian tool-making center has also been found in the small town of San Bartolo near the city. Around 2,000 BCE nomadic groups here began to be replaced by sedentary peoples who formed farming villages in an area then known as Itzcuincuitlapilco, of which the municipality of Pachuca is a part. Later artifacts from between 200 CE and 850 CE show Teotihuacan influence with platforms and figurines found in San Bartolo and in Tlapacoya, and it has been argued Teotihuacan monopolized the Pachuca deposit to control and influence Obsidian trade in Central Mexico during the Classic Period. Development of this area as a city, however, would lag behind other places in the region such as Tulancingo, Tula and Atotonilco El Grande, but the archeological sites here were on the trade routes among these larger cities.

After the Teotihuacan era, the area was dominated by the Chichimecas with their capital in Xaltocan, who called the area around Pachuca Njunthé. Later, the Chichimecas would found the dominion of Cuauhtitlán pushing the native Otomis to the Mezquital Valley. These conquests coalesced into a zone called Cuautlalpan, of which Pachuca was a part. Fortifications in the area of Pachuca city and other areas were built between 1174 and 1181. This dominion would eventually be overrun by the Aztec Triple Alliance between 1427 and 1430, with rule in Pachuca then coming from the city of Tenochtitlan. According to tradition, it was after this conquest that mineral exploitation began here and in neighboring Real del Monte, at a site known as Jacal or San Nicolás. The Aztec governing center was where Plaza Juárez in Pachuca city is now.

The Spanish arrived here in 1528, killing the local Aztec governor, Ixcóatl. Credit for the Spanish conquest of the Pachuca area has been given Francisco Téllez, an artilleryman who came to Mexico with Hernán Cortés in 1519. He and Gonzalo Rodriguez were the first Spaniards here, constructing two feudal estates, and calling the area Real de Minas de Pachuca. Téllez was also given credit for laying out the colonial city of Pachuca on the European model but this story has been proven false, with no alternative version. Mining resources were not discovered here until 1552, and there are several versions of this story. The most probable comes from a work called "Descripción Anónima de la Minas de Pachuca" (Anonymous Description of the Mines of Pachuca) written between the end of the 16th century and the beginning of the 17th. This work claims that the first mineral deposits were found by Alonso Rodríguez de Salgado on his ranch on the outskirts of Pachuca in two large hills called Magdalena and Cristóbal. This discovery would quickly change the area's economy from agriculture to one dependent almost completely on mining.

As early as 1560 the population of the city had tripled to 2,200, with most people employed in mining in some way. Because of this rapid growth and the ruggedness of the terrain, it was impossible to lay out an orderly set of streets. The first main plaza was placed next to the Asunción Parish, which is now the Garden of the Constitution. Next to the Cajas Reales (Royal Safe) was constructed to guard the fifth that belonged to the king.

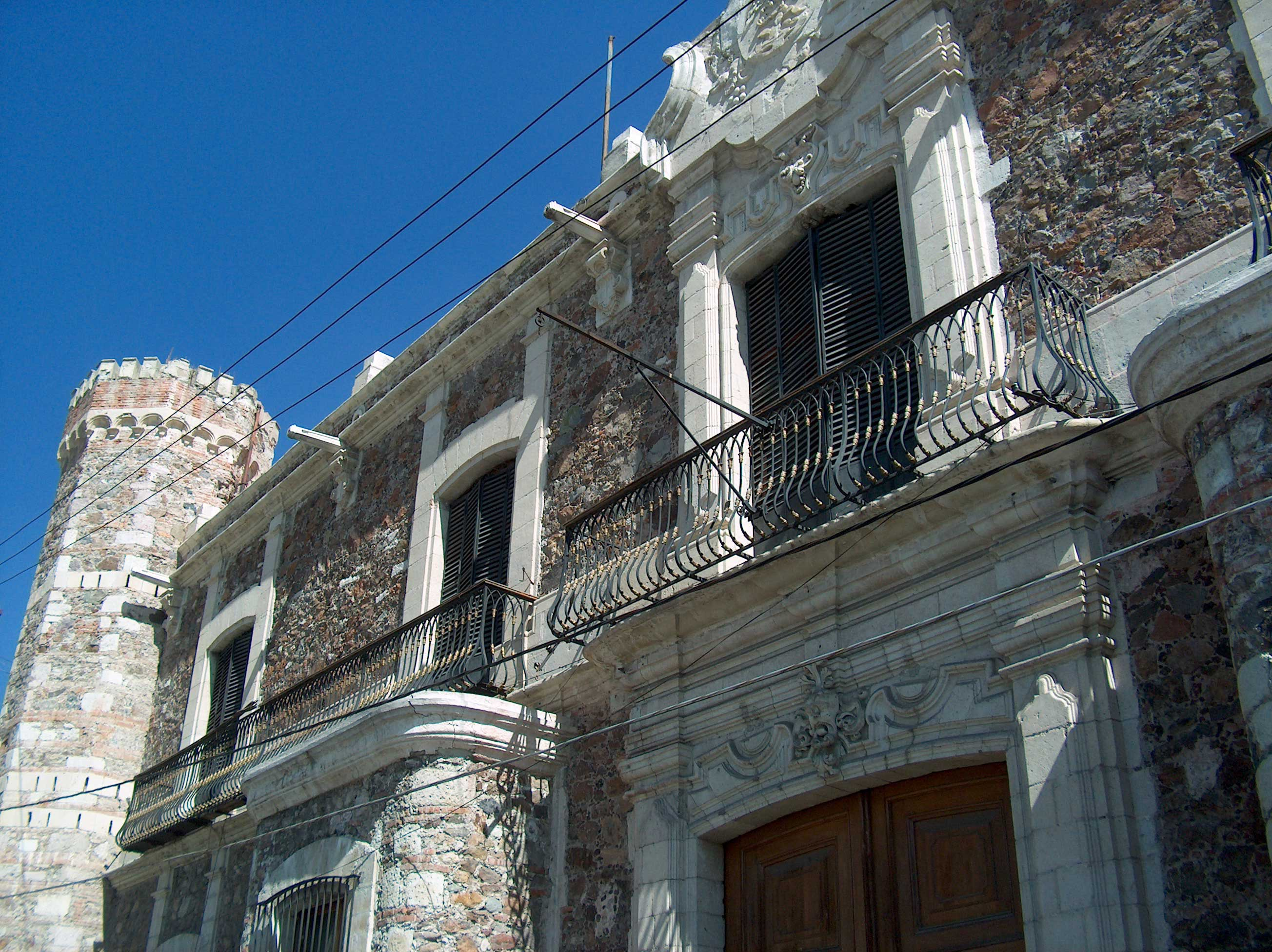
The Cajas Reales, built to guard the fifth of miners' finds that belonged to the king

In 1554, on the Purísima Concepción Hacienda, now the site of a tennis club, Bartolomé de Medina found the largest mineral deposits here as well as developed new ways of extracting minerals from ore using the patio process. This caused Pachuca to grow even more with the discovery of new deposits and accelerated extraction processes. Mining operations spread to nearby areas such as Atotonilco, Actopan, and Tizayuca. The population of the town continued to grow, leading Pachuca to be declared a city in 1813.

Mining output had waned by the 18th century due to flooding, but was revived in 1741 by the first Count of Regla, Pedro Romero de Terreros, and his business partner Jose Alejandro Bustamante, who invested in new drainage works. He also discovered new veins of ore, mostly in nearby Real del Monte. By 1746, Pachuca had a population of 900 Spanish, mestizo, and mulatto households, plus 120 Indian ones.

During the Mexican War of Independence, the city was taken by Miguel Serrano and Vicente Beristain de Souza in 1812, which caused the mines here to be abandoned by owners loyal to Spain. The war left the Pachuca area in a state of chaos, both politically and economically. The third Count of Regla brought the first Cornish miners and technology around 1824. The Cornish took over mines abandoned by the Spanish, bringing 1,500 tonnes of more modern equipment from Cornwall. Cornish companies eventually dominated mining here until 1848, when the Mexican–American War forced them to sell out to a Mexican company by the name of Mackintosh, Escondón, Beistegui and John Rule. Mining operations resumed in 1850, especially in the Rosario mine.

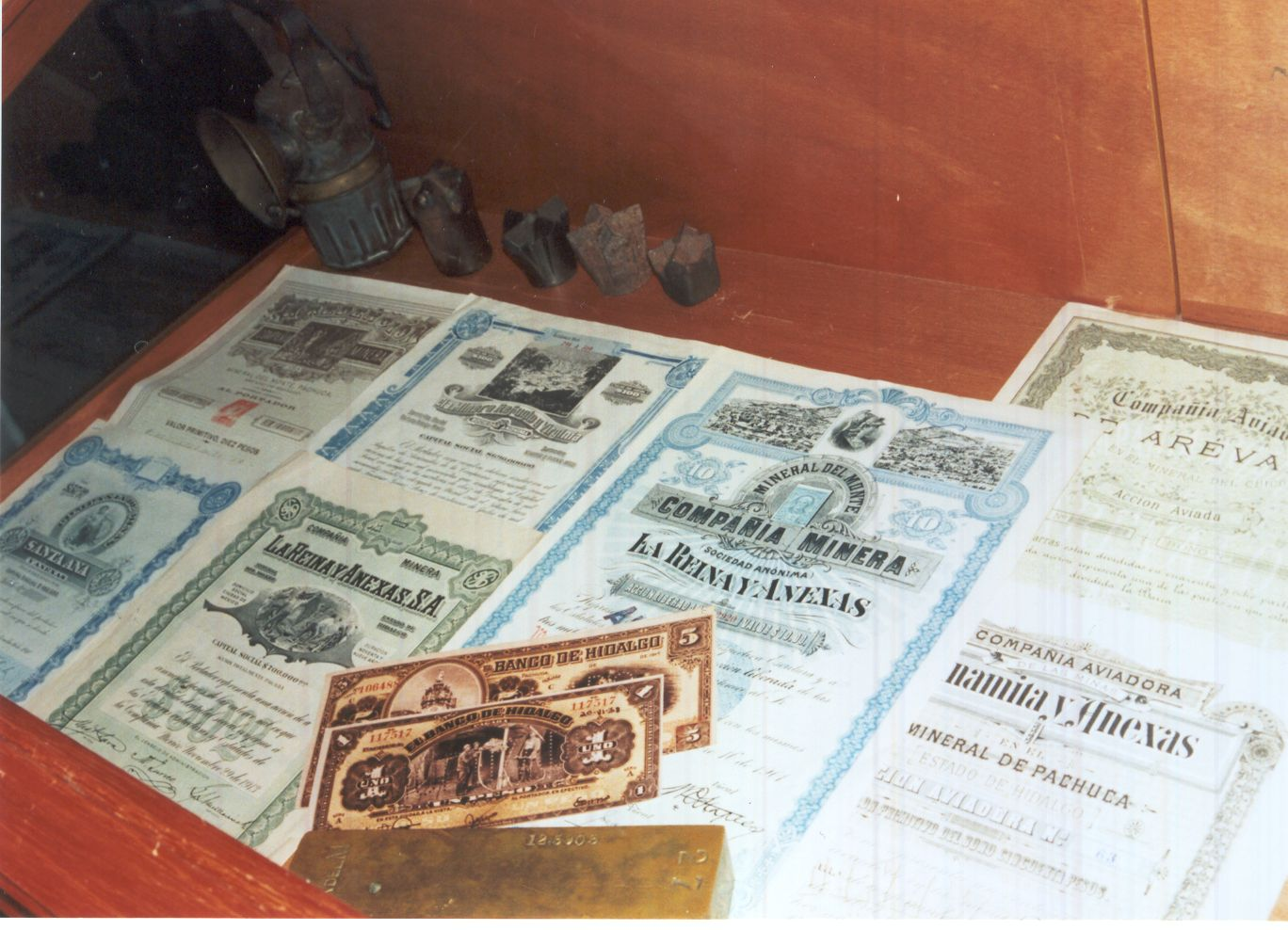
Stock certificates in mining companies of Pachuca in the Museo de Minería

Mining operations were disrupted again by the Mexican Revolution in the early 20th century. The city was first taken by forces loyal to Francisco I. Madero in 1911. Roberto Martinez y Martinez, a general under Pancho Villa, entered the city in 1915. Both incursions were due to the economic importance of the mines here. During this time American investors came to Pachuca, again updating the mining technology used here. From 1906 to 1947 the United States Smelting, Refining and Mining Company was the primary producer here, with output reaching its peak in the 1930s. However, by 1947, mining here had become too costly, because of political instability, labor disputes and low prices for silver on the world market. The company sold its interests to the Mexican government in 1965.

The decline in mining here in the mid-20th century had disastrous effects on the city. Many of the abandoned houses and other buildings were in danger of collapse. Under ownership of the Mexican government, mining came to a near standstill. During this time Pachuca's economy began to shift from mining to industry. The old Instituto Científico Literario Autónomo de Hidalgo was converted to the Universidad Autónoma del Estado in 1961, which would become one of the impetuses to the growth of the city in the following years, turning out as it did a better-educated and more technical workforce in areas such as law, engineering, business and medicine. In the late 1950s and through the 1960s, some growth was seen in the way of suburban developments for workers in newly built factories.

Population growth returned in the 1970s and continued through the 1990s because of the growth of non-mining industries as well as a development of a large student population for the state university as well as other educational institutions. Another impetus was the movement of many government offices to Pachuca with new government facilities such as the State Government Palace and the State Supreme Court built in the 1970s. Much of the city's growth during this time was due to new housing projects, but infrastructure projects such as the new Municipal Market, the remodeling of the Plaza Benito Juárez and the main bus station also took place.

== Geography ==
=== Climate ===
Pachuca has a semi-arid climate (Köppen climate classification BSk). The climate is cool with high rainfall and occasional hail during the summer months and dry conditions during the winter. The coldest month is January, with an average high of 20 °C (68 °F) and an average low of 3 °C (37 °F). Winter nights are cold and the temperature can drop below 0 °C (32 °F). The warmest month is May, with an average high of 24 °C (75 °F) and a low of 9 °C (48 °F). Due to its high altitude, nighttime temperatures remain cool throughout the year. The average annual precipitation is 412 millimetres (16.2 in), mostly concentrated in the months May through September. In terms of extremes, the record high was 34.5 °C (94 °F) and the record low was −9 °C (16 °F).

Climate data for Pachuca (1951–2010)
Month	Jan	Feb	Mar	Apr	May	Jun	Jul	Aug	Sep	Oct	Nov	Dec	Year
Record high °C (°F)	25.0 (77.0)	29.0 (84.2)	28.4 (83.1)	33.2 (91.8)	34.5 (94.1)	33.0 (91.4)	27.0 (80.6)	27.0 (80.6)	27.0 (80.6)	27.0 (80.6)	26.0 (78.8)	25.0 (77.0)	34.5 (94.1)
Mean daily maximum °C (°F)	19.8 (67.6)	20.7 (69.3)	23.0 (73.4)	24.6 (76.3)	24.1 (75.4)	22.0 (71.6)	20.7 (69.3)	20.8 (69.4)	20.5 (68.9)	20.4 (68.7)	20.0 (68.0)	19.7 (67.5)	21.4 (70.5)
Daily mean °C (°F)	11.3 (52.3)	12.1 (53.8)	14.3 (57.7)	16.2 (61.2)	16.6 (61.9)	15.7 (60.3)	15.0 (59.0)	14.8 (58.6)	14.5 (58.1)	13.6 (56.5)	12.1 (53.8)	11.6 (52.9)	14.0 (57.2)
Mean daily minimum °C (°F)	2.8 (37.0)	3.4 (38.1)	5.6 (42.1)	7.8 (46.0)	9.2 (48.6)	9.4 (48.9)	9.2 (48.6)	8.8 (47.8)	8.4 (47.1)	6.9 (44.4)	4.2 (39.6)	3.5 (38.3)	6.6 (43.9)
Record low °C (°F)	−9.0 (15.8)	−6.0 (21.2)	−7.0 (19.4)	−2.0 (28.4)	1.0 (33.8)	0.0 (32.0)	2.0 (35.6)	3.0 (37.4)	−2.0 (28.4)	−3.0 (26.6)	−6.0 (21.2)	−7.0 (19.4)	−9.0 (15.8)
Average precipitation mm (inches)	8.7 (0.34)	8.4 (0.33)	13.6 (0.54)	32.9 (1.30)	58.3 (2.30)	70.0 (2.76)	69.7 (2.74)	49.3 (1.94)	58.3 (2.30)	24.8 (0.98)	11.3 (0.44)	6.6 (0.26)	411.9 (16.22)
Average precipitation days (≥ 0.1 mm)	2.6	2.6	3.3	7.1	9.5	11.9	12.6	9.7	10.2	5.5	3.4	1.9	80.3
Average relative humidity (%)	57	53	50	52	58	68	72	72	74	69	63	61	62
Mean monthly sunshine hours	245.6	233.7	244.9	223.8	247.1	206.7	210.0	222.7	179.2	223.5	230.3	226.7	2,694.2
Source 1: Servicio Meteorológico Nacional
Source 2: Colegio de Postgraduados (sun and humidity)

== The city ==
The city occupies a small valley and is almost completely surrounded by large hills, which are also covered in colorful housing. The city centre has maintained most of its colonial-era structures, with narrow winding streets. Away from this centre is the more modern Pachuca, with warehouses, factories, supermarkets and a large football stadium called El Huracán (The Hurricane). The local team has won eight national and international titles here since it was built. The city proper has a population (2005) of 267,751 which is 97% of the population of the municipality. The Pachuca zona metropolitana (ZM) is one of the 56 officially defined areas for the 2005 Census (2010 not released) consisting of the municipalities of Pachuca de Soto, Real del Monte, and Mineral de la Reforma making a total of 7 municipios, with a combined population of 438,692 inhabitants as of 2005, up from 375,022 in 2000, covering 1202 km^{2}. Pachuca was declared the capital of Hidalgo by Benito Juárez in 1869.

=== City attractions ===
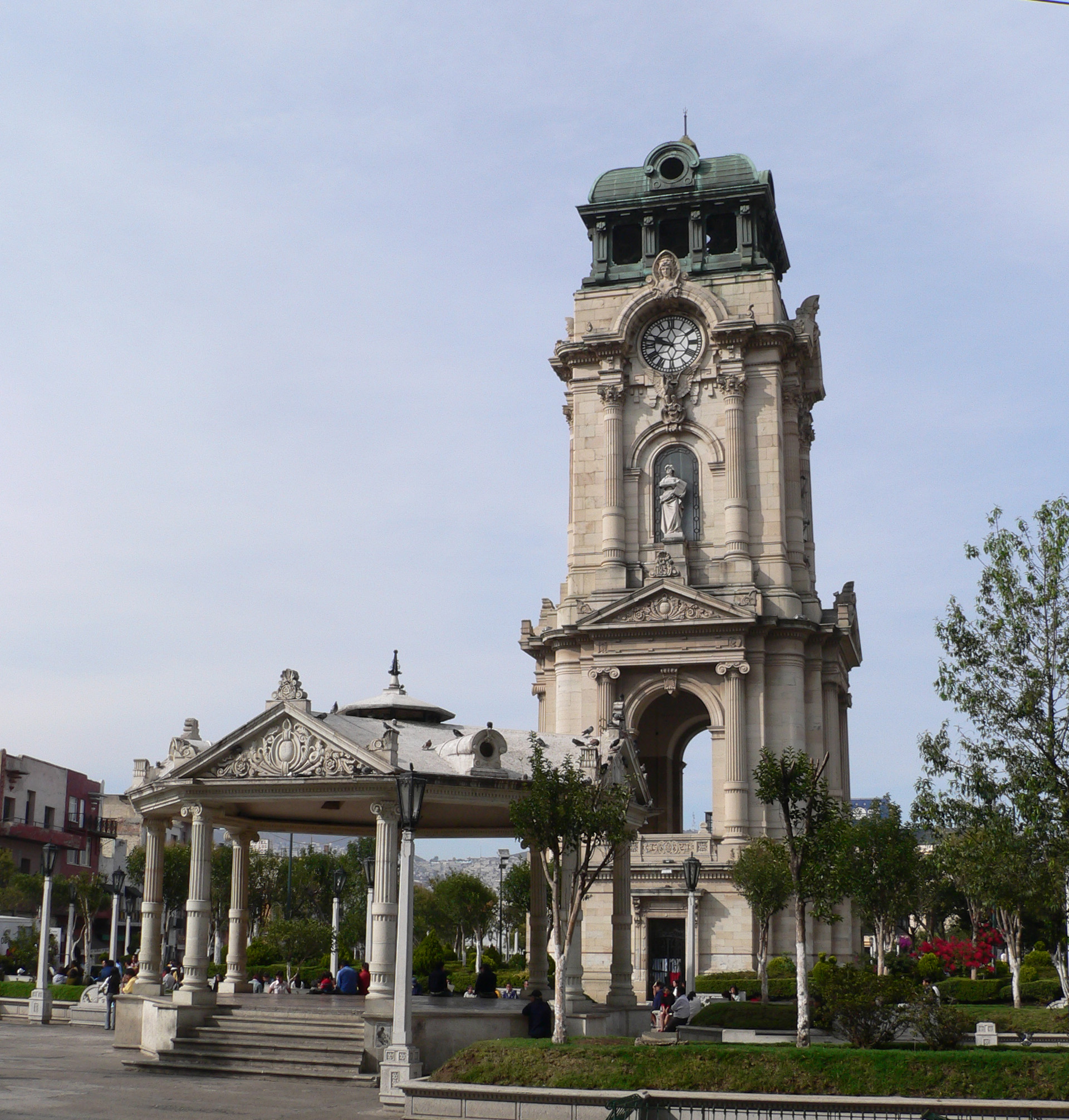
The Reloj Monumental—Monumental Clock

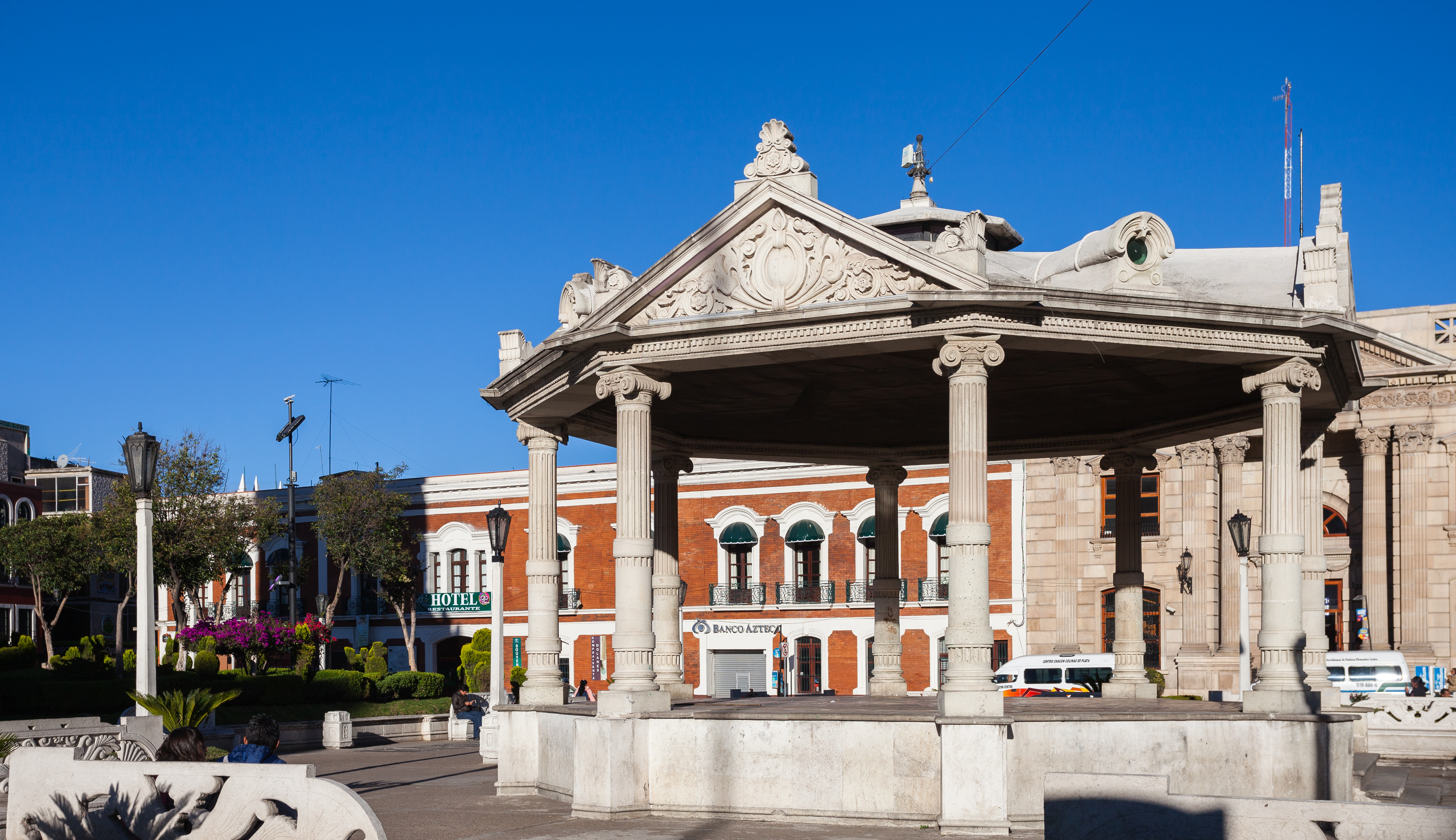
Independence square

Pachuca is center of one of the most important mining areas in Mexico, and for this reason, most of the city's attractions are based on the mining industry. Many of these are located near Hidalgo Street, which is one of the oldest in Pachuca and runs alongside the arcade of the main plaza (Plaza de la Constitución) to Hidalgo Park. The oldest markets and houses are also located on this street, many of which are well-preserved.

Reloj Monumental

The Monumental Clock of Pachuca is the icon of the city. Donated by Cornishman, Francis Rule, it was built to commemorate the Centennial of Mexico's Independence, and was inaugurated on 15 September 1910 (Noche de Grito). The base of the Reloj was made originally for a kiosk but it was decided to put the clock here instead. A group from the city had the idea for the clock, and they, along with Mexican ambassador Jesús Zenil arranged to have the same company that built Big Ben, construct the inner workings. The outer monument portion is Mexican-made and was supervised by engineers Francisco Hernández and Luis Carreón. It is a tower with four parts in Neoclassic style, constructed of white "cantera" stone with a height of 40 meters. In the middle there are four sculpted faces of women done in marble by Carrara, which symbolise the Reform, Liberty, Independence and Constitution.

Church and ex monastery of San Francisco

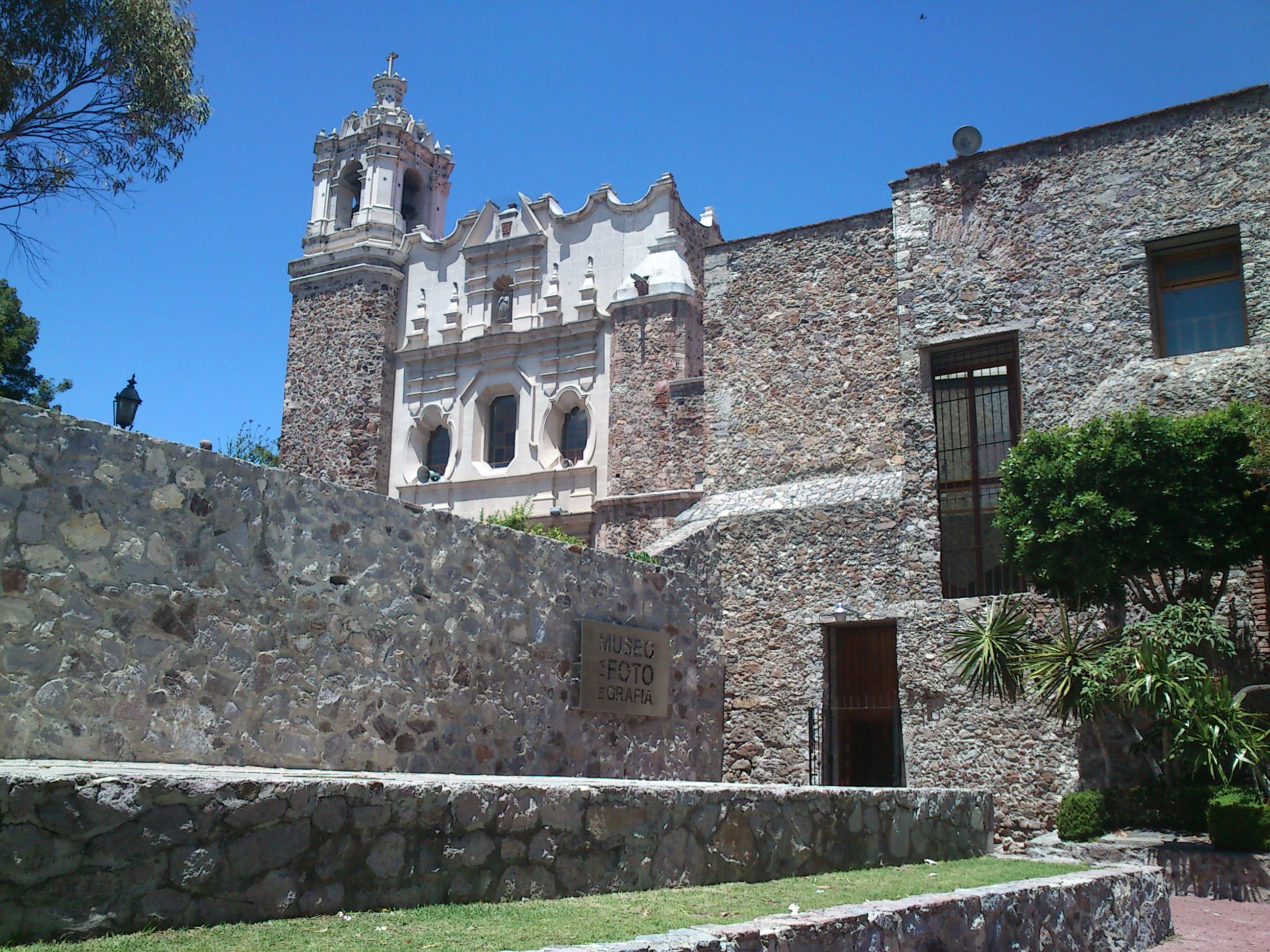
Church and ex monastery of San Francisco

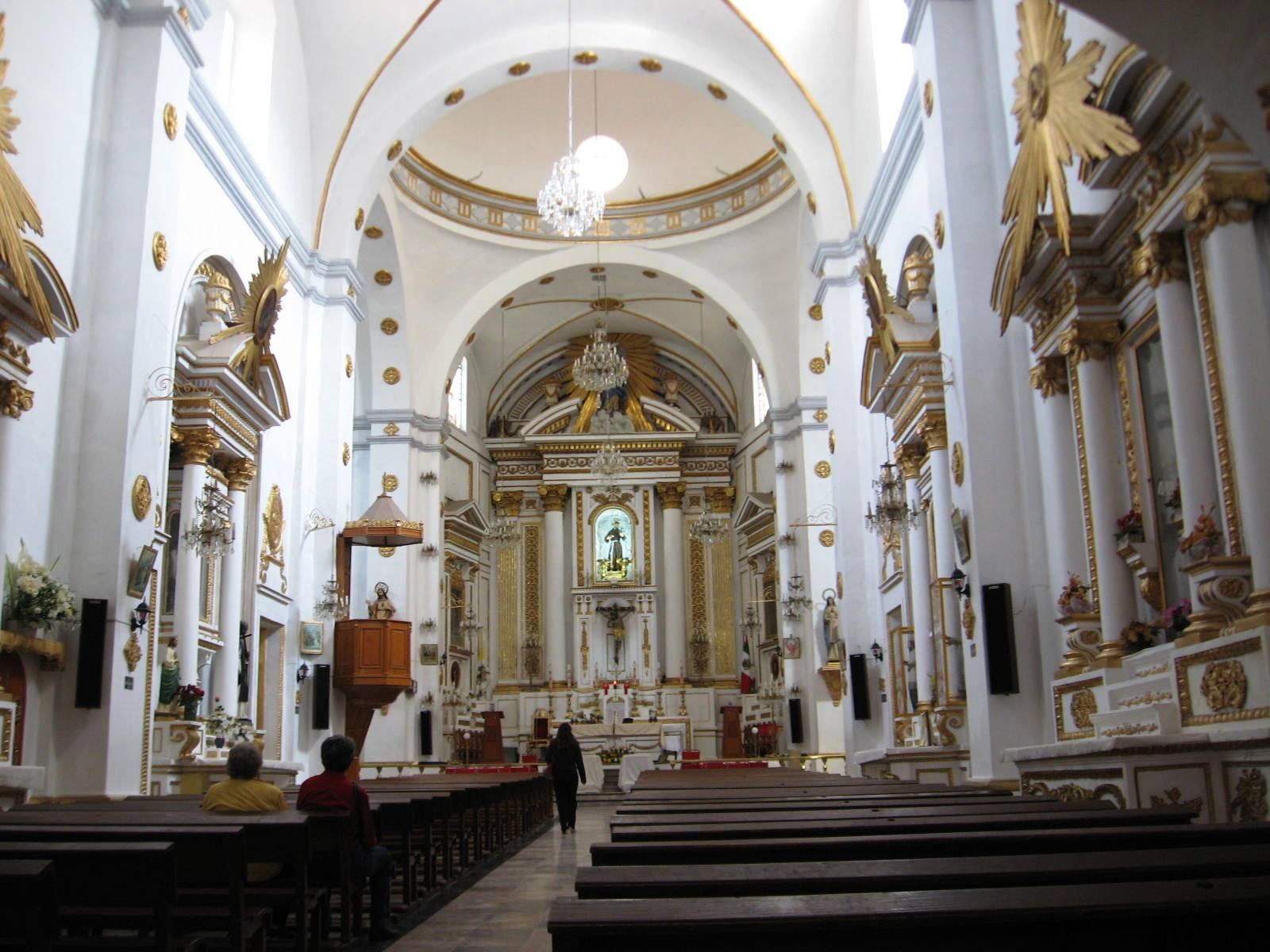
Church of San Francisco interior

The Church and ex monastery of San Francisco were begun in 1596, and the church was completed c. 1660. The façade is in the colonial Spanish Baroque style. The interior conserves aspects of its 16th-century origins, including the groin vault. The church contains oil paintings by regionally well-known artists of the 18th century. The sacristy has a beautiful ritual sinks in sculpted stone, one of which is decorated with Talavera tile from Puebla. It also has paintings depicting the genealogy and life of Francis of Assisi.

The adjoining cloister was completed in 1604. It has not been a monastery for many years, and had a number of subsequent uses. It had greatly deteriorated, until recently restored to house the Centro Cultural Hidalgo. Behind the church is the Chapel of Nuestra Señora de la Luz. Built between the 17th and 18th century, it contains the only Churrigueresque altar in the city. This altar also contains the remains of the Count of Regla, Pedro Romero de Terreros.

The Museum of Photography and Photographic Library of INAH, and the Regional Museum, occupy much of the complex now. The photography museum contains antique photography equipment as well as works by known photographers such as Guillermo Kahlo and Tina Modotti. To the east of the monastery complex is the Bartolomé de Medina Park. The City Theater and the School of Arts face the park.

Asunción Church

The Asunción Church is the oldest in the city, constructed in 1553, and remodeled several times, with major reconstruction in 1719. The Asunción Chapel has an entrance with two levels. The lower one contains the door and has a round arch, flanked by two pilasters and a Baroque architrave. The upper level has a choir window, with a niche above and topped by a pediment. The bell tower also has two levels, both with round arches.

Mercantil Bank—Bancomer Building

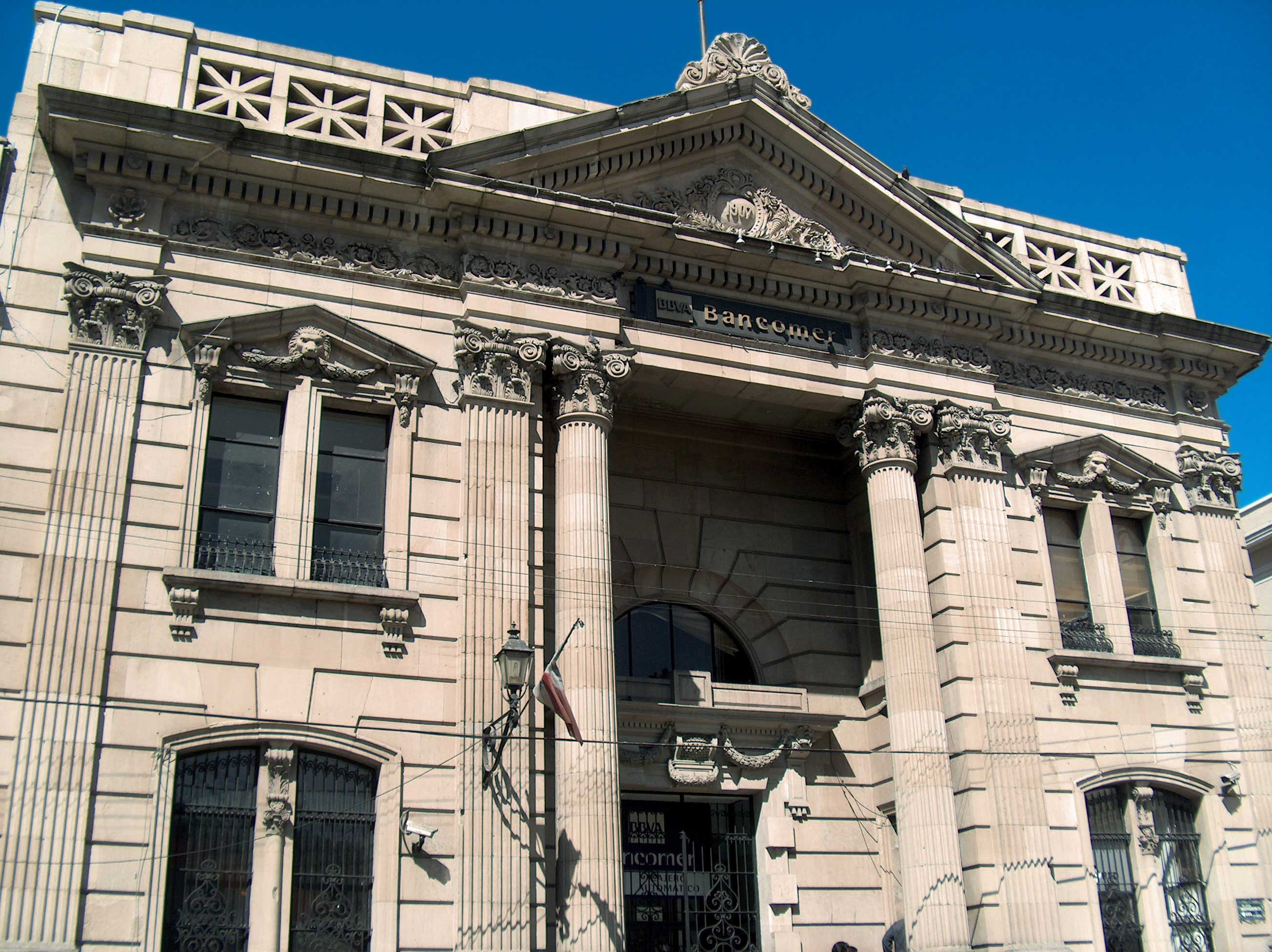
Hidalgo Bank—Bancomer building

The Bancomer Building is located at the front of the main plaza. It was designed in the Neoclassical style, and built in 1902. It was first occupied by the Mercantil Bank, then by the Hidalgo Bank and then was converted into the Niágara Hotel. Today it has returned to being a bank. It has a notable façade of brown cantera stone, lightly sculpted, with a keystone in the form of a parchment, cornice, Ionic columns and geometric designed in the upper parts. It is topped by a pediment which contains the figure of a lion.

Cajas Reales

The Cajas Reales was where miners paid a 20% share of their extractions to the Spanish Crown. It not only collected the taxes, it was the only place that sold the mercury needed to extract silver from ore as a monopoly of the state. It was constructed in the 17th century by viceroy Sebastián de Toledo Márquez Mancera. It is a two-story building with a central patio. The façade contains two towers that flank the main entrance and the north side to serve as guard stations for the building. It has housed the offices of the Compañía Real del Monte y Pachuca since 1850. Emperor Maximillian I stayed here when he visited the city in 1865.

Methodist Church

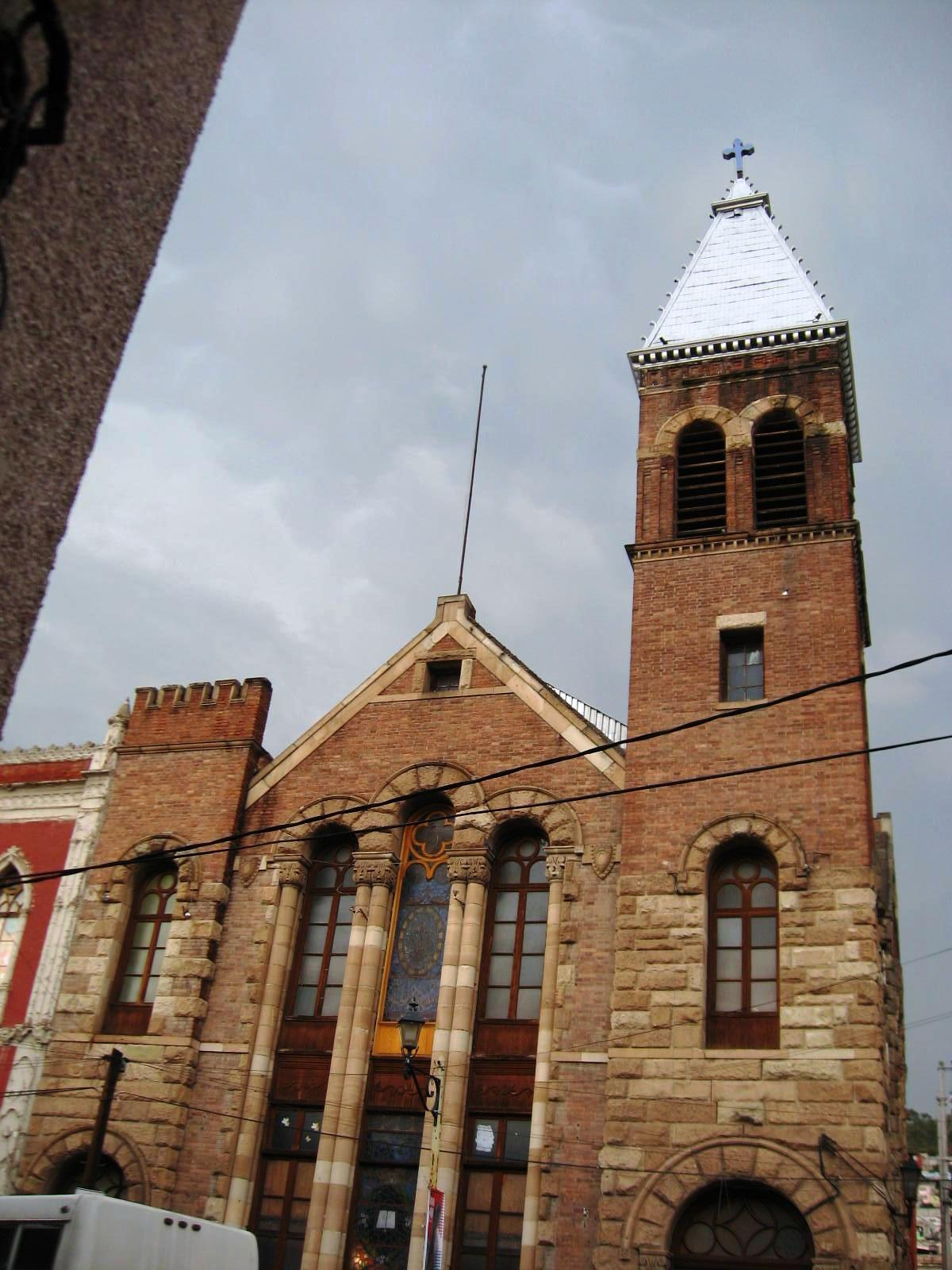
Romanesque Revival style Methodist church

The Methodist Church building was built in the early 20th century, and is distinguished by its locally rare Romanesque Revival style. It is considered an important building of the Cornish period in the state.

It remains a Protestant church and contains the Julián Villagrán School.

Casa Colorado

The Casa Colorado, part of the hacienda of the Conde de Regla, was built in the 18th century. It has an austere façade of a reddish colour, which gives the house its name. The building formerly had an interior courtyard with a Gothic style cloister arcade, but was demolished when enclosed.

In 1886 Governor Francisco Cravioto acquired this building to house state judicial offices. The building served the judiciary through the mid-20th century. Many of the streets connecting from here to nearby Hidalgo Street are named after former notable lawyers and judges.

Archivo Historico y Museo de Minería

The Archivo Historico y Museo de Minería—Historic Archive and Museum of Mining is located on Mina Street in a manor that dates from the 19th century, called the Cajas de San Rafael. The mansion is constructed of cantera stone and occupies a space of 950m2.

It contains documents that trace the history of mining here from 1556 to 1967, and the more than a billion ounces of silver and the five million ounces of gold that have been extracted from the state of Hidalgo during that time. The museum has three exhibition halls, a covered courtyard and a garden which contains mining machinery. such as a steam shovel, a winch and a truck used for transport of ore. The exhibition halls contain displays relating to how minerals are found in nature and the tools and processes used to extract them. It also houses a large collection of documents, a library and a photography laboratory. The documentation contained here was rescued starting in 1987. In 1993 the current site was renovated to house the collection. The collection also includes miners' personal effects, as well as artworks relating to mining.

Museo de Mineralogía

The Museo de Mineralogía—Museum of Mineralogy belongs to the Universidad Autónoma del Estado de Hidalgo. The mineralogy museum is housed in the old Hospital de San Juan de Dios. It was built and operated by monks until 1869, when the state converted the building into the Instituto Literario y Escuela de Artes y Oficios. The museum exhibits a large collection of mineral specimens from the region.

Municipal Palace—Rule House

The Municipal Palace or Conde Rule House is located on Leandro Valle and Morelos streets. It is a two-story building constructed at the end of the 19th century. The main entrance is flanked by two pilasters and topped with a pediment decorated with reliefs made of shells.

It belonged to a rich Cornish miner by the name of Francis Rule, and later became the Municipal Palace.

Macromural

The macromural of Pachuta is located in the Palmitas suburb. It consists of an entire quarter on a hillside painted in colourful murals.

Other attractions

Formerly there was an English/Cornish neighborhood in the central part of Pachuca. The British Consulate is all that remains there, located in an "English style" residence built at the beginning of the 20th century.

The Mercado de Barreteros is on the Central Plaza, and considered one of the most valuable architectural elements in the city. The lower level is dedicated to services such as cafés, and the upper floor is dedicated to arts and crafts shops. The Monument of Christ the King is located on the Santa Apolonia Mountain and is one of the largest in Mexico.

The Archivo del Estado de Hidalgo—Museum of the State of Hidalgo is located in the Civic Centre of the State Congress. Its collection focuses on the history of the state of Hidalgo, through archival photographs and documents. Its collection also includes national history items.
The Museo El Rehilete is an interactive museum for children with exhibits on archeology, botany, other sciences and the arts.

The Sede del Salón de la Fama del Fútbol—Hall of Fame of Football is in the shape of a football, and located in Parque David Ben Gurion of the Zona Plateada district. The Universidad de Fútbol—Football University is the only training facility of its kind in the Americas, and one of only a few in the world.

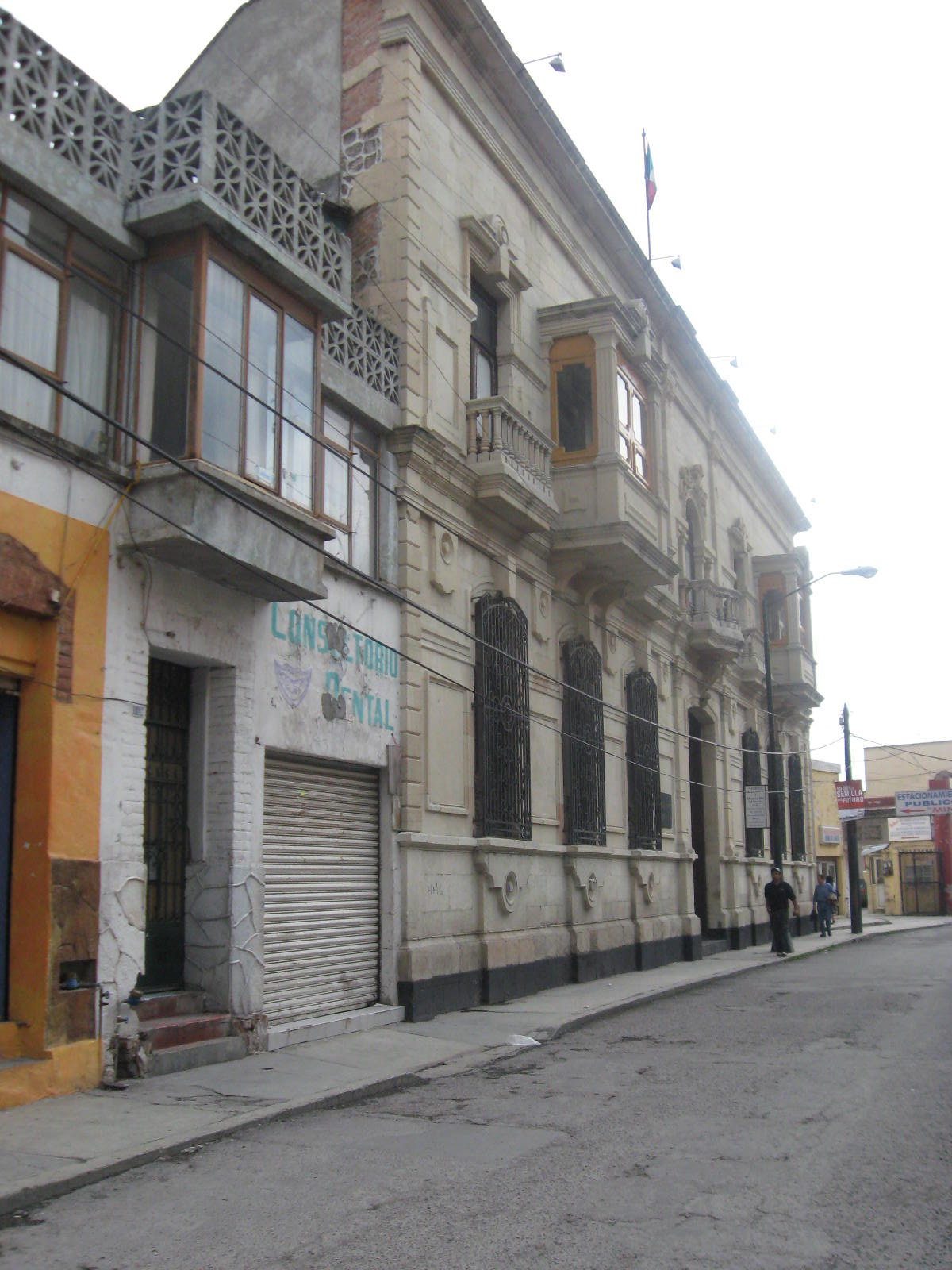
Archivo Historico y Museo de Minería

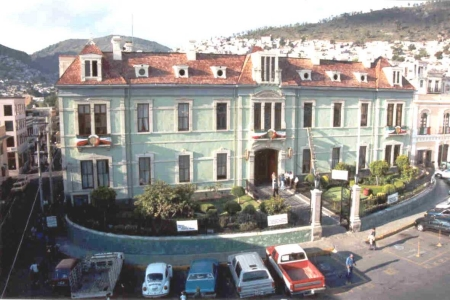
Municipal Palace—Conde Rule House

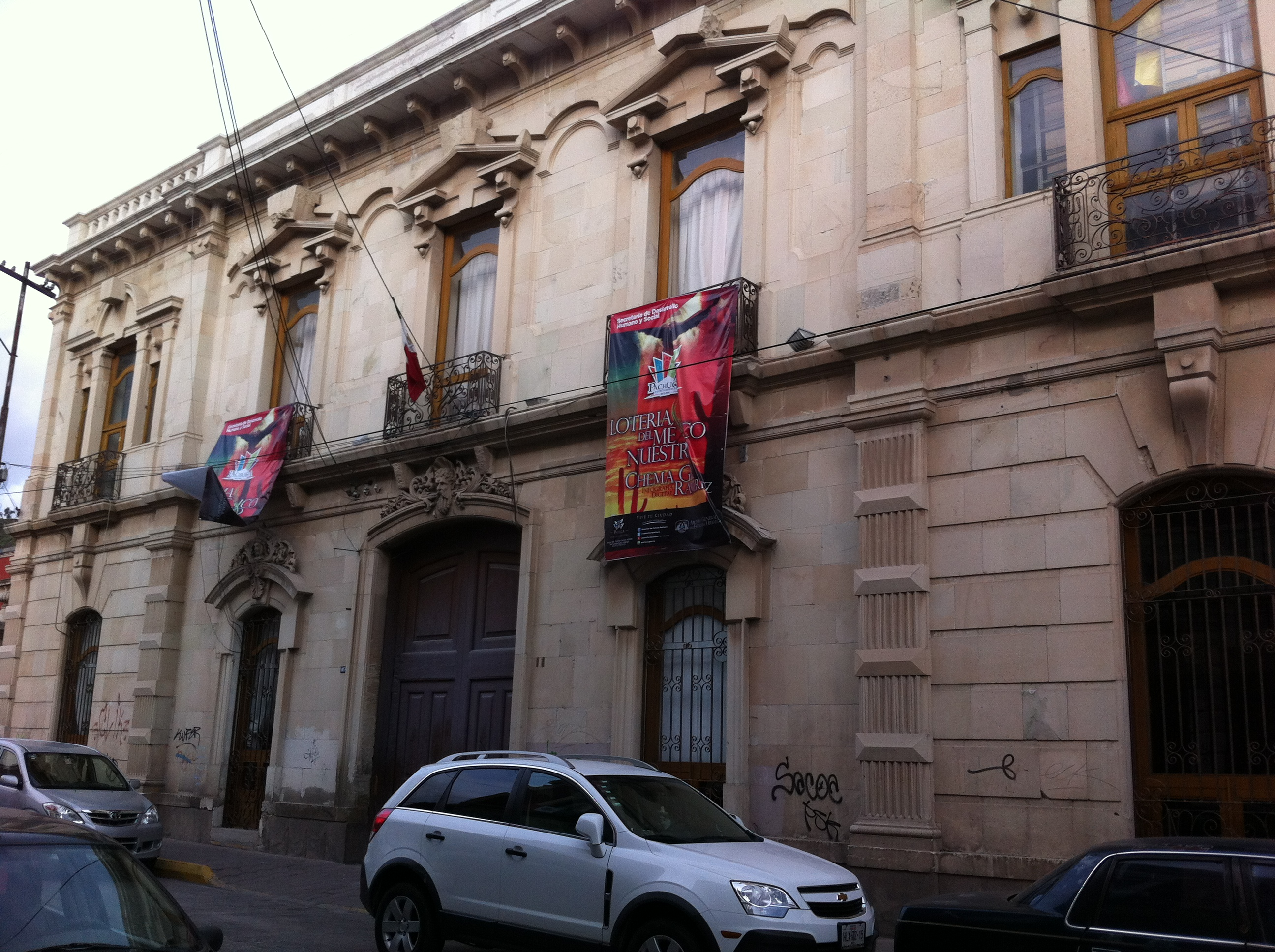
Archivo del Estado de Hidalgo

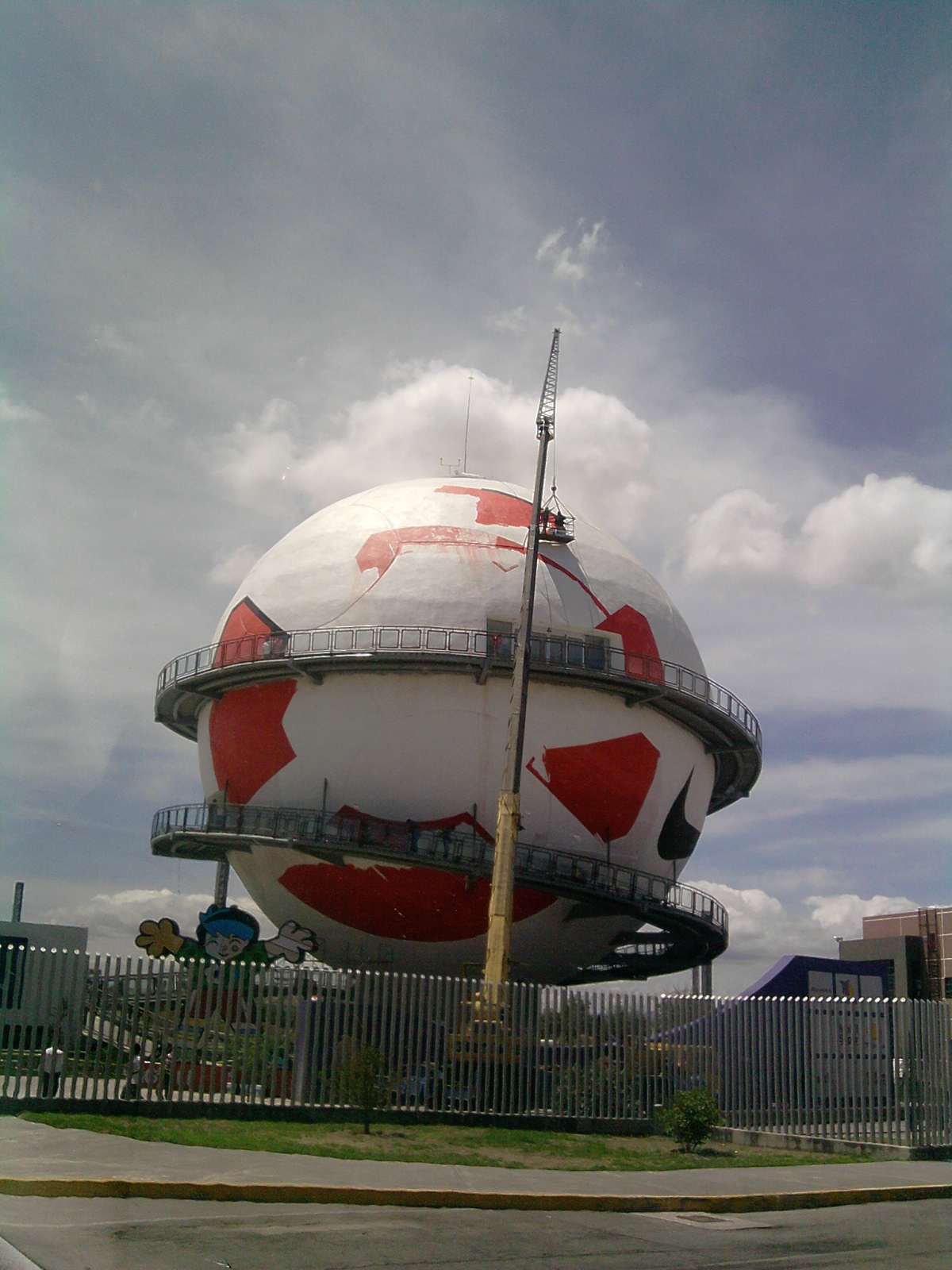
Site of Hall of Fame of Football

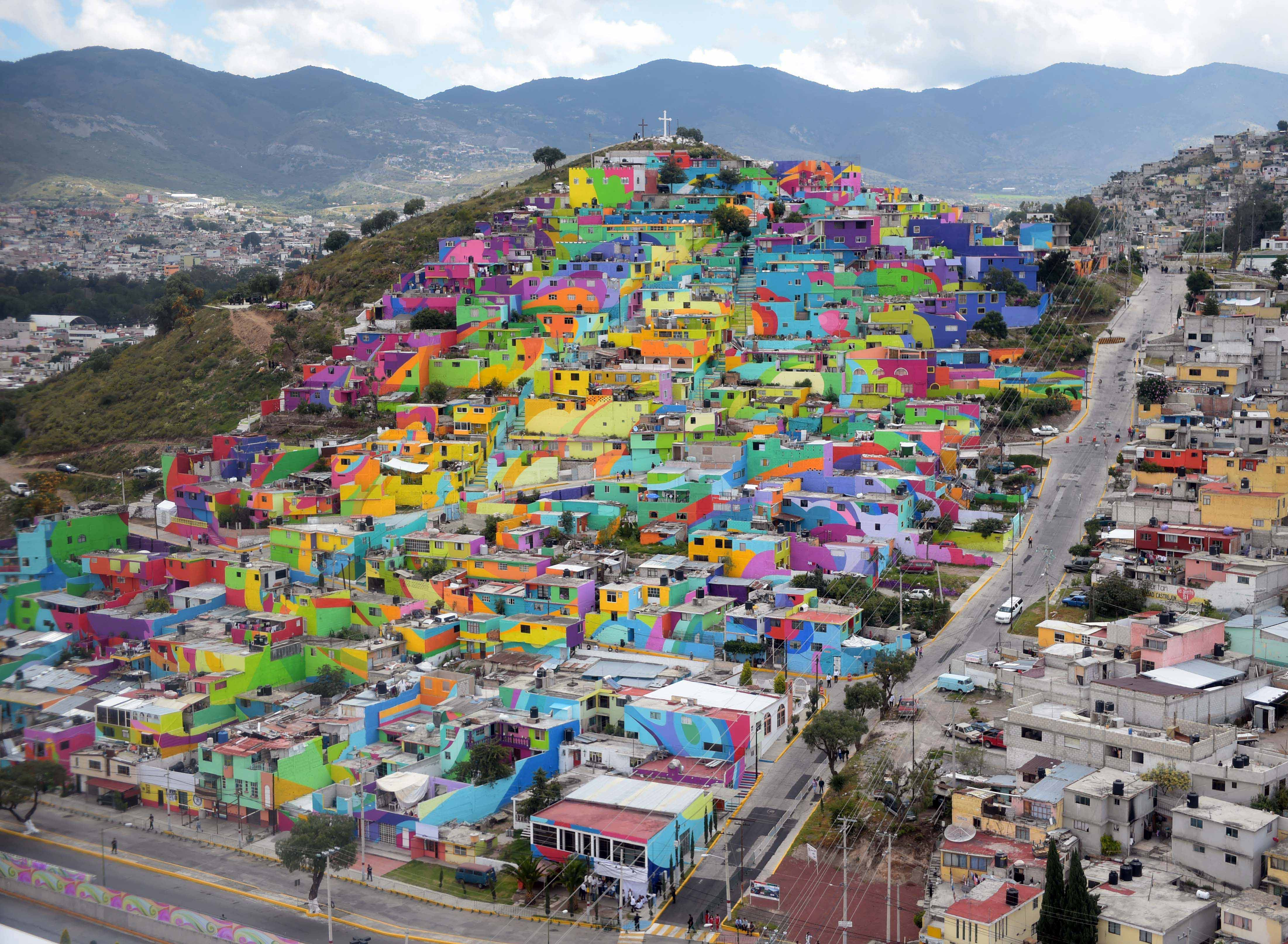
Macromural of Pachuca

=== Education ===
The Universidad Autónoma del Estado de Hidalgo was constructed over the old Hospital de San Juan de Dios. It is the oldest educational institution in Hidalgo, brought into being at the same time as the state. The school was originally established as the Instituto Literario y Escuela de Artes y Oficios (Literary Institute and School of Arts and Letters) in 1869. The school was initially in a rented house but was moved to the former Hospital of San Juan de Dios in 1875. This building is now the Central Building. The school was based on positivist philosophy and the University motto of "Amor, orden y progreso" ("love, order and progress") remains to this day. The school was renamed the Universidad de Hidalgo in 1925 and again to the Universidad Autónoma de Hidalgo in 1948. The university was reorganized and expanded in 1961.

A more recently established school opened in 2003 is the Universidad Politécnica de Pachuca (Polytechnic University of Pachuca), which is mostly an engineering school. It was temporarily housed in the old Universidad Pedagógica Nacional buildings, but in 2004 the state of Hidalgo ceded the university the old Santa Barbara Hacienda, with 231 students studying classes in Mechatronics, Information technology and Biotechnology at the new facility. New programs of study in Physical Therapy, Software engineering, Optomechatronics, Information security, Information technologies and communications.

== The English/Cornish influence ==
=== History ===
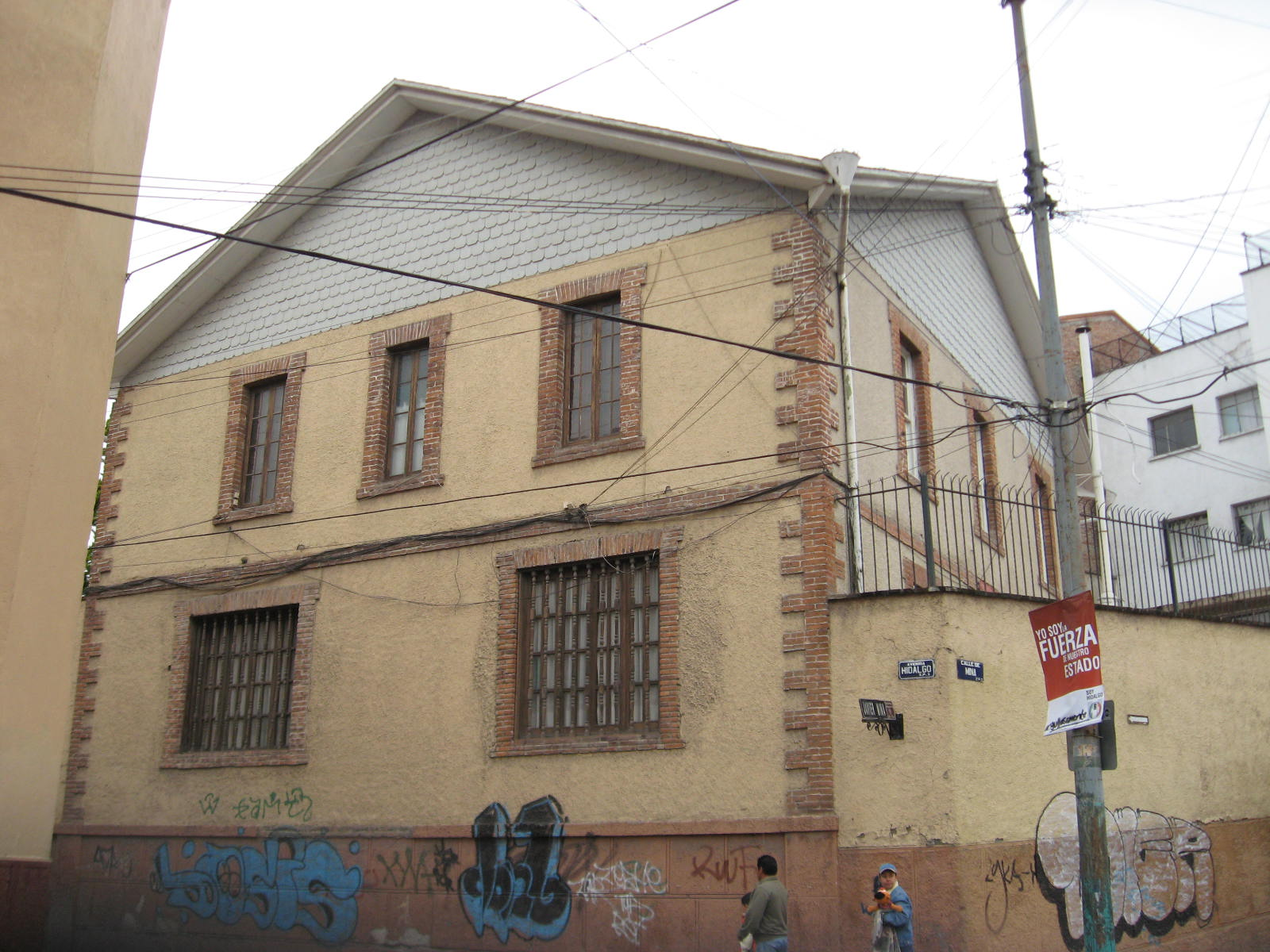
Old English-style house, in historic central Pachuca

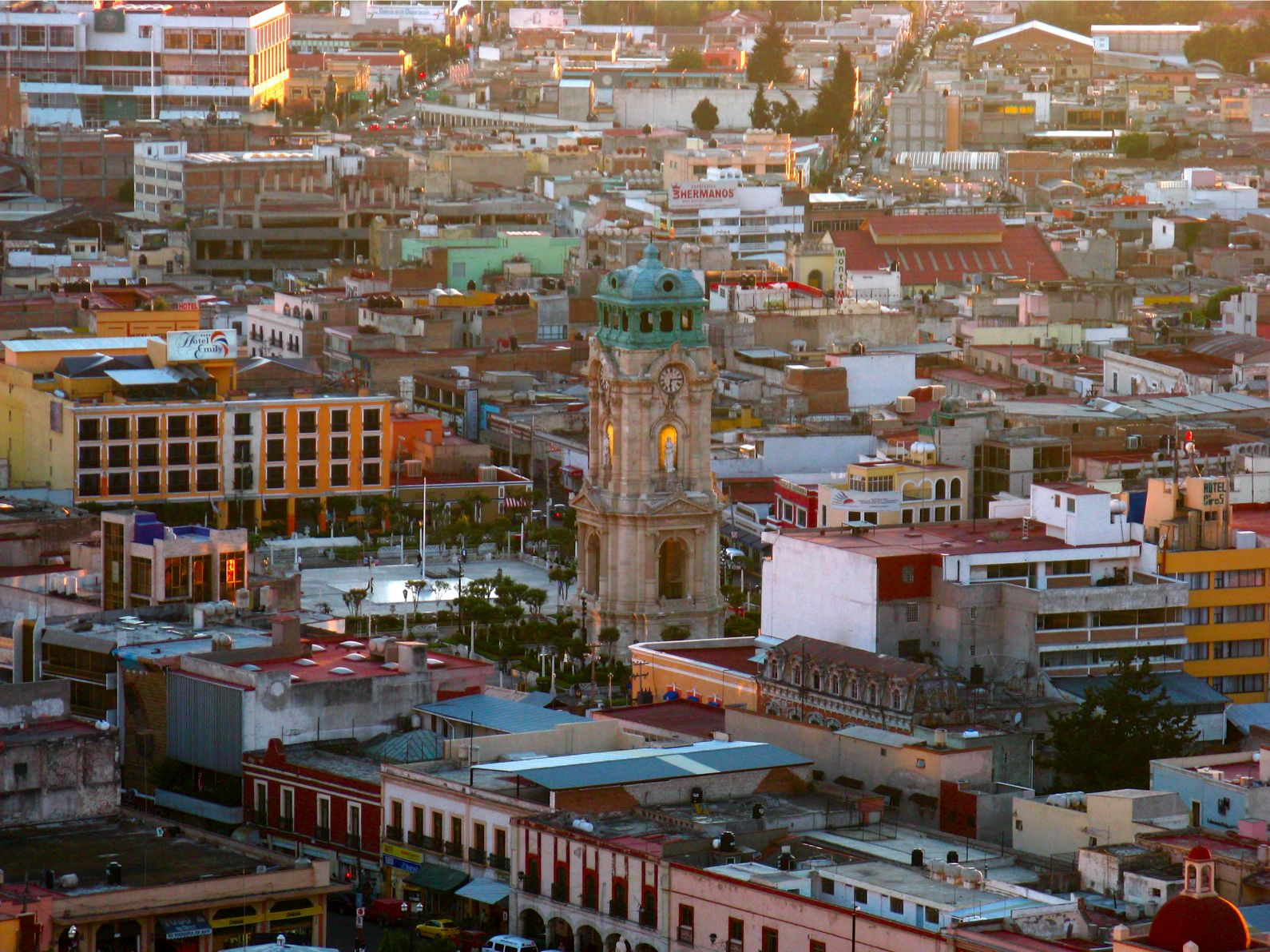
Historic center of Pachuca at dusk, with Monumental Clock

Beginning in 1824, Cornish miners and English investors came to Pachuca and the neighboring town of Real del Monte to invest and work in the mines here. Some founded the Compañía Real de Monte y Pachuca. Mexico's remaining Cornish community represents a largely forgotten immigrant story. In the early 19th century, miners in Cornwall were enduring economic hardships. Ships carrying 125 passengers and some 1,500 tons of equipment sailed out of Falmouth, Cornwall, landing in Veracruz three months later. The treacherous 500-kilometre (300 mi) trek inland killed about half of the miners and their family members, many succumbing to malaria and yellow fever. Those who made it settled in Pachuca and Real del Monte.

The immigrants brought technology, notably the famous high-pressure steam pumping engines designed by Cornish engineer Richard Trevithick, which turned many of the area's water-logged mines into huge silver producers. The majority of the immigrants to this region came from Cornish mining areas of Camborne, Redruth and Gwennap. Cornish/English workers and their technology revitalized the silver industry here and miners' remittances sent back home helped to build the Wesleyan Chapel in Redruth in the 1820s.

Architecture

Today the Pachuca – Real del Monte District retains much from its period of association with Cornwall and home of one of Mexico's most enduring cross cultural pollinations. The miners' influence is obvious in architecture. Up in the hills around Pachuca, many houses feature distinctly British characteristics: thicker walls, square windows and pitched roofs. Some of Pachuca's landmarks have English/Cornish influences. The Spanish Baroque style Reloj Monumental (Monumental Clock) chimes to the tune of Big Ben, and was financed by Francis Rule. The city's main Methodist church was built by Cornish miners. The English mining company's main office as well as the residence of Francis Rule of Camborne, the last Cornish manager of the Real del Monte mine, still bears his initials. The archives of the company are part of the "Historic Archive and Museum of Mining in Pachuca" (Museo de Minería) collections, and contain detailed records of Cornish employees, especially between 1824 and 1849.

=== Influences ===
The Cornish immigrants married into Mexican families, and even today Cornish surnames are not uncommon in this area with hundreds of Cornish descendants present. One example is Umberto Skewes, who speaks little English but whose grandfather came to Mexico from Cornwall. Skewes is custodian of the English Cemetery, which contains approximately 600 graves, predominantly of Cornish miners and their families. The Cornish-Mexican Cultural Society works to build educational links between Mexico and the United Kingdom. The group has marketed Pachuca and Real del Monte as "Mexico's Little Cornwall" through the Mexican embassy in London.

Cornish and English miners introduced to Mexico such things as tennis, golf, rugby, cricket, and chess. However the two introductions which have had the greatest influence on Pachuca's identity are football and pastes.

==== Football ====
In 1900 Cornish miners established the Pachuca Athletic Club, which was primarily dedicated to football. Their first game was played in the same year, a fact that is celebrated annually. The first team from Pachuca consisted of Charles Dawe, John Dawe, James Bennetts, John Bennetts, William Blamey, Richard Sobey, William Bragg, William Thomas, Percy Bunt, Lionel Bunt, Albert Pengelly and William Pengelly. The Pachuca club encouraged the formation of teams in Mexico City and Orizaba, the first championship of the new Liga Mexicana de Fútbol Asociación was played in 1902. Other clubs, such as the Reform Athletic Club, El British Club, F. C. and El México Cricket Club were also formed by miners. The first Mexican player appears in the ranks of the Pachuca club in 1908 and by 1915, most of the team was Mexican. Pachuca won the Copa Tower in 1908 and 1912, the precedent of the modern Mexican Cup. The team disbanded in the 1920s but was re-instituted in 1951. Pachuca calls itself the "Cradle of Mexican Football."

==== Pastes ====
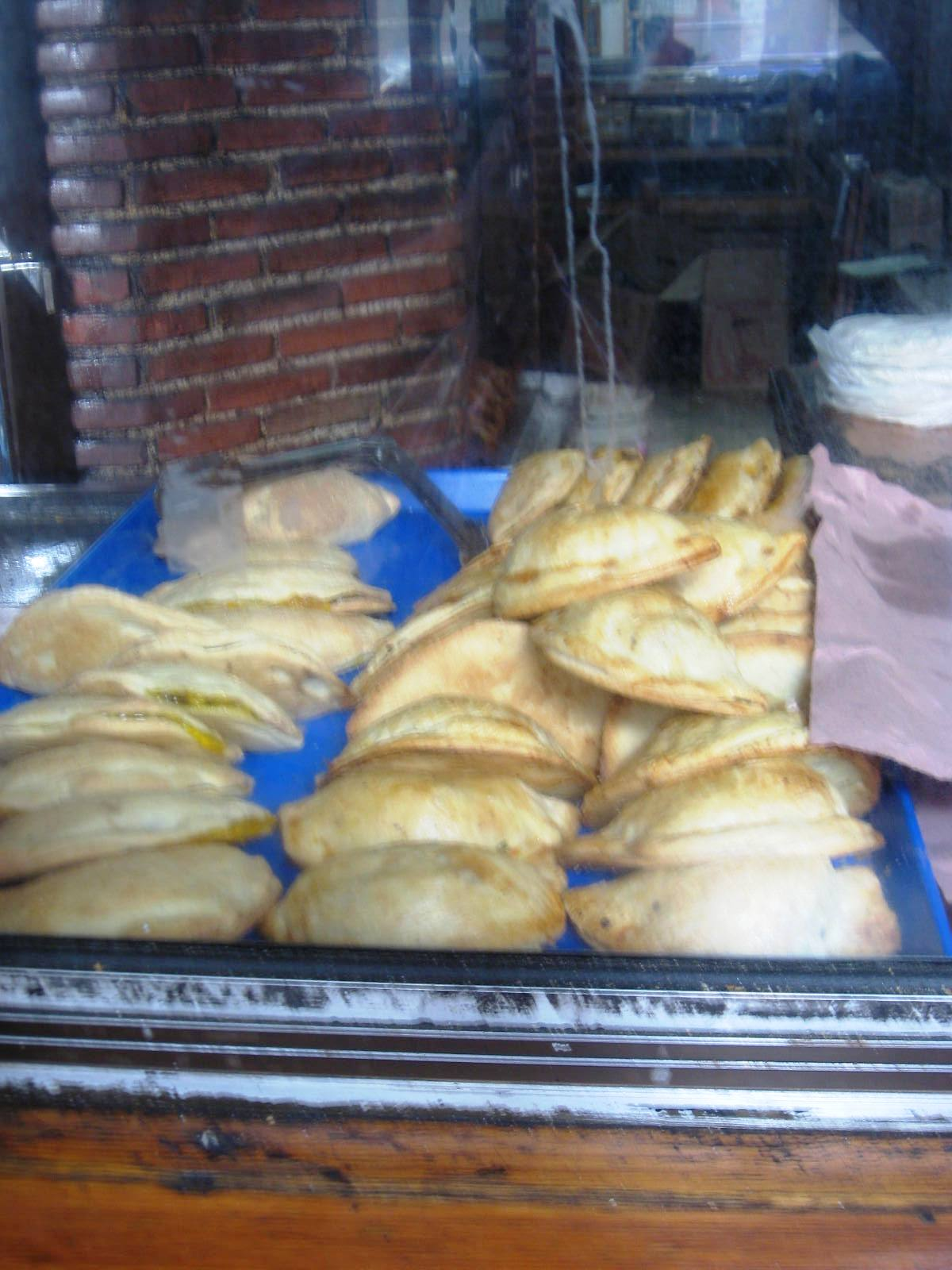
Pastes for sale

The Mexican Spanish word "paste" (pronounced PAH-steh) come from the Cornish word pasties, which is basically a semi-circular turnover made with a pastry crust with sweet or savory fillings. Cornish miners brought the recipe with them as they made a good way to bring their midday meal with them to the mines. One feature of both pasties and pastes is that they have a thick braided edge. Originally, this was done to provide the miners a way to hold the turnover without getting the filled portion dirty, as there was no way to wash their hands before eating. The shape and pastry portion of the turnover have remained the same but today, the fillings are decidedly Mexican: mole verde, beans, mole rojo, chicken "tinga," pineapple, rice pudding and one seasonal specialty is a lamb paste with poblano chili peppers. Pastes are a local delicacy strongly identified with both Pachuca and Real del Monte.

== Festivals ==
The Feria de Pachuca is known colloquially by several names such as the Feria Tradicional/Internacional de San Francisco, the Feria de Hidalgo and the Feria de Caballo. It is the most important annual event in the state of Hidalgo, taking place every October in facilities located in the south of Pachuca. The festival began as a liturgical event sponsored by monks at the monastery of San Francisco in the 16th century, which eventually drew dignitaries from surrounding communities. The festival sponsors a number of events such as bullfights, cockfights, charreadas, horse shows, rodeos, crafts and folk dance shows, livestock exhibitions and features regional cuisine. It also host concerts by well-known Mexican musical artists.

Other notable events in the city include the Ramón Noble Guitar Festival and the Feria Hidaltur. The first presents concerts by guitarists of various genres from countries such as Brazil, Spain, the U.S., Israel, England and Mexico. There are classes and workshops by renowned artists as well as a national level competition for classical guitar. The Feria Hidaltur is held in March and April with the purpose of promoting the arts and crafts of Hidalgo state. The festival also has equestrian events, hot-air balloons and other attractions.

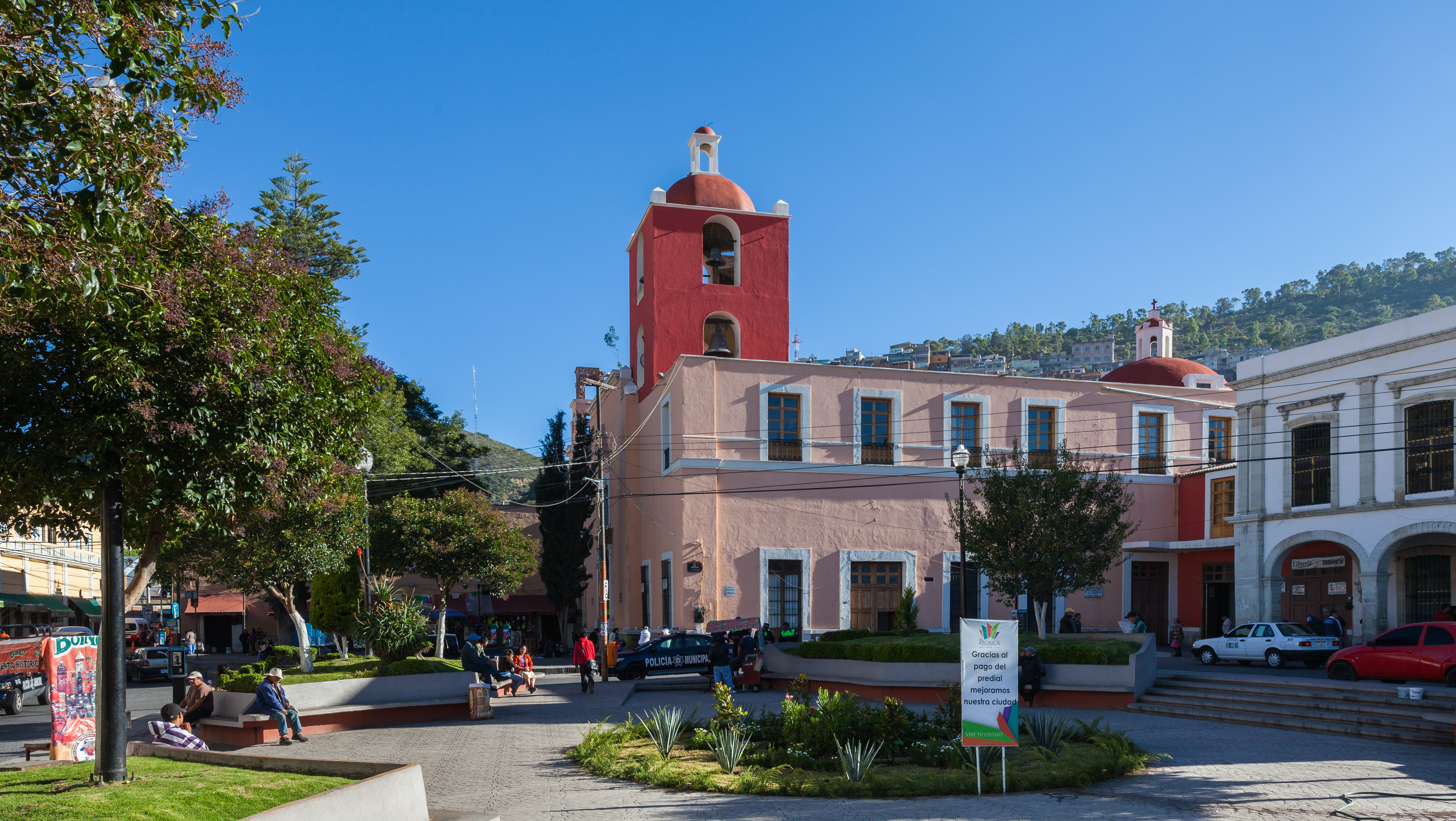
Plaza Constitución

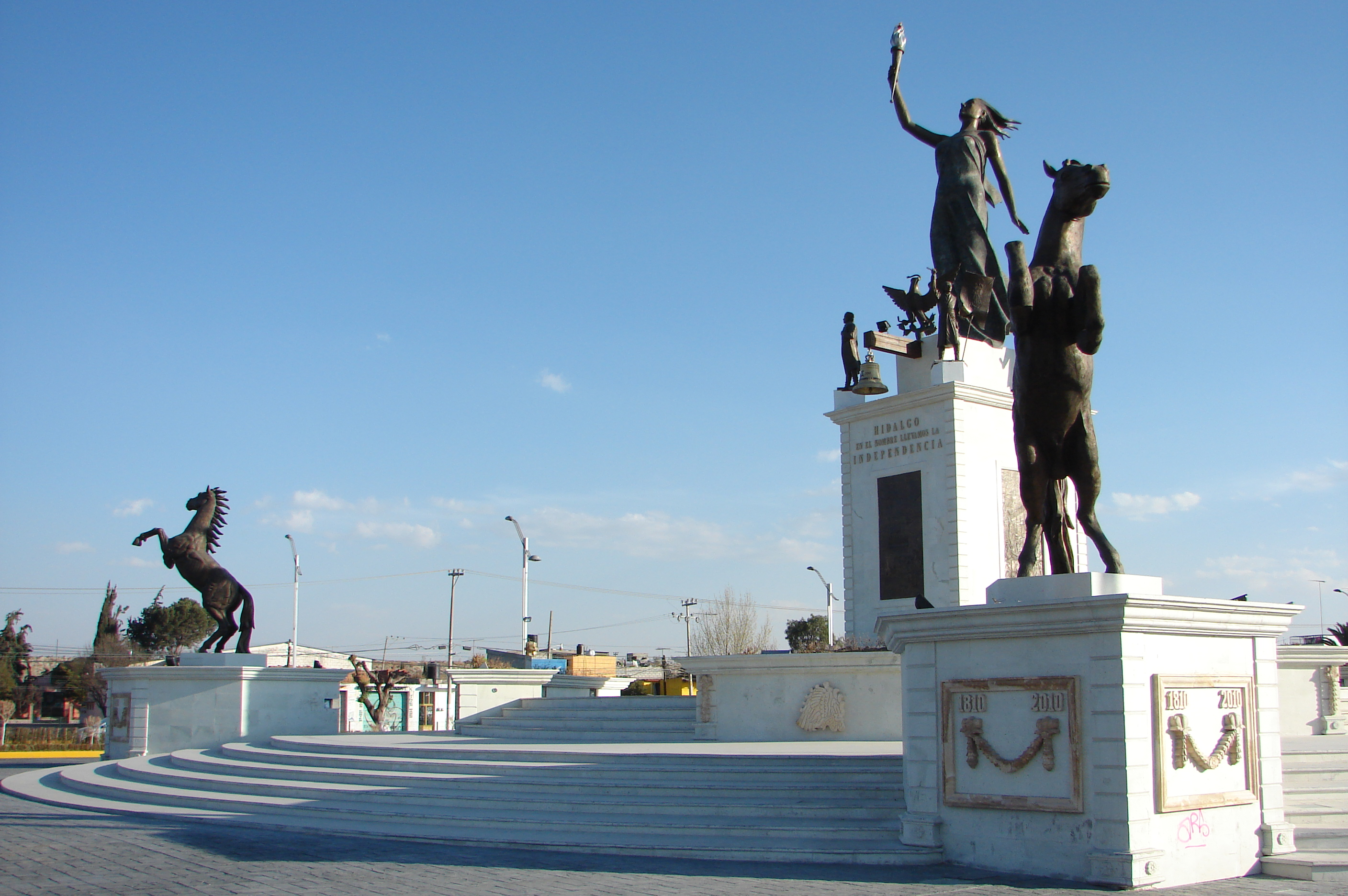
Monument La Victoria del Viento in Bicentennial Plaza

== Economy ==
Despite its decline in the 20th century, mining still continues to be an important element of Pachuca's economy. Pachuca still produces more than 60% of the state's gold and more than 50% of its silver. The Mexican Geological Survey is headquartered in the city.

The manufacturing sector was established in the 1950s and has been steadily growing, changing the city's traditional mining image. Some of the major industrial employers are Applied Power de México (automotive parts), BARROMEX (machinery), Herramientas Cleveland (machinery and tools) and Embotelladora la Minera (soft drinks). The city also contains over 800 smaller manufacturing enterprises.

The municipality's economy also has a large commercial sector, with numerous stores and thirteen public markets. It is also the wholesale center for foodstuffs for most of the state.

Despite all the changes in the 20th century, the center of Pachuca has maintained its provincial feel. This has led the city to promote it as a tourist attraction.

== Pachuca Municipality ==
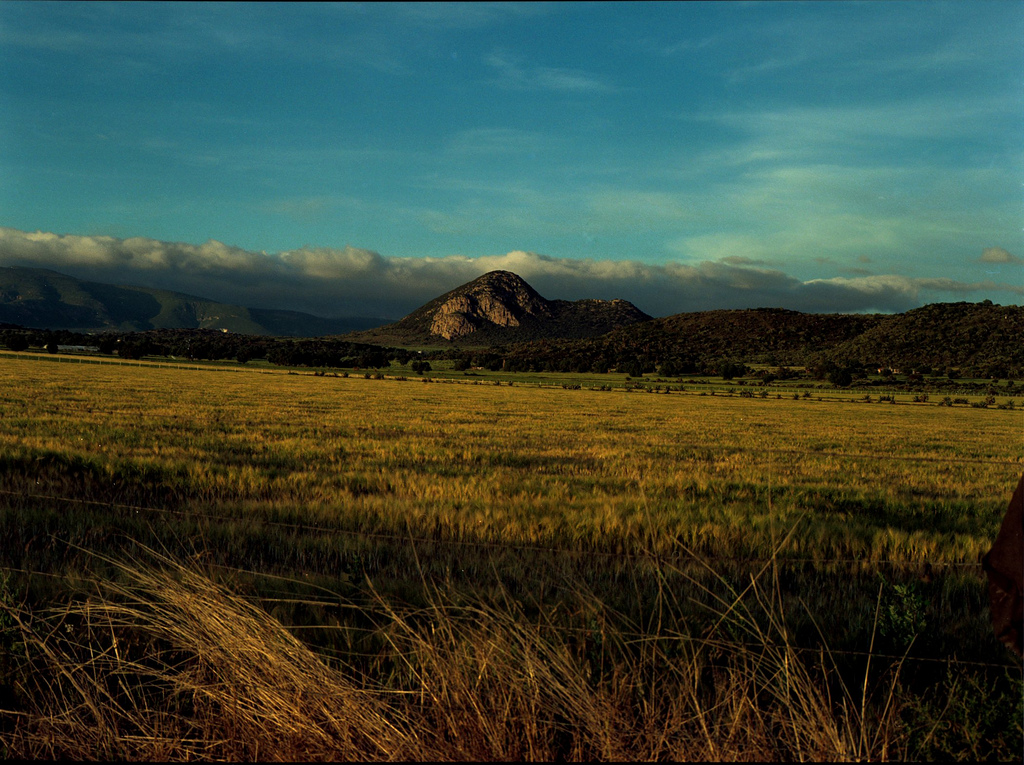
Pachuca-Tizayuca Valley, Pachuca Municipality

The Pachuca Municipality is increasingly co-extensive with the city, as the city's metro area development grows to cover over 60% of the available open space. The municipality contains fifteen other communities, with all but two having less than 1500 people according to the 2005 INEGI census. Only three percent of the municipality population of 275,578 lives outside the city boundaries.

== Mines ==
Silver Mines in the municipalities of Mineral del Monte, Mineral de la Reforma and Pachuca

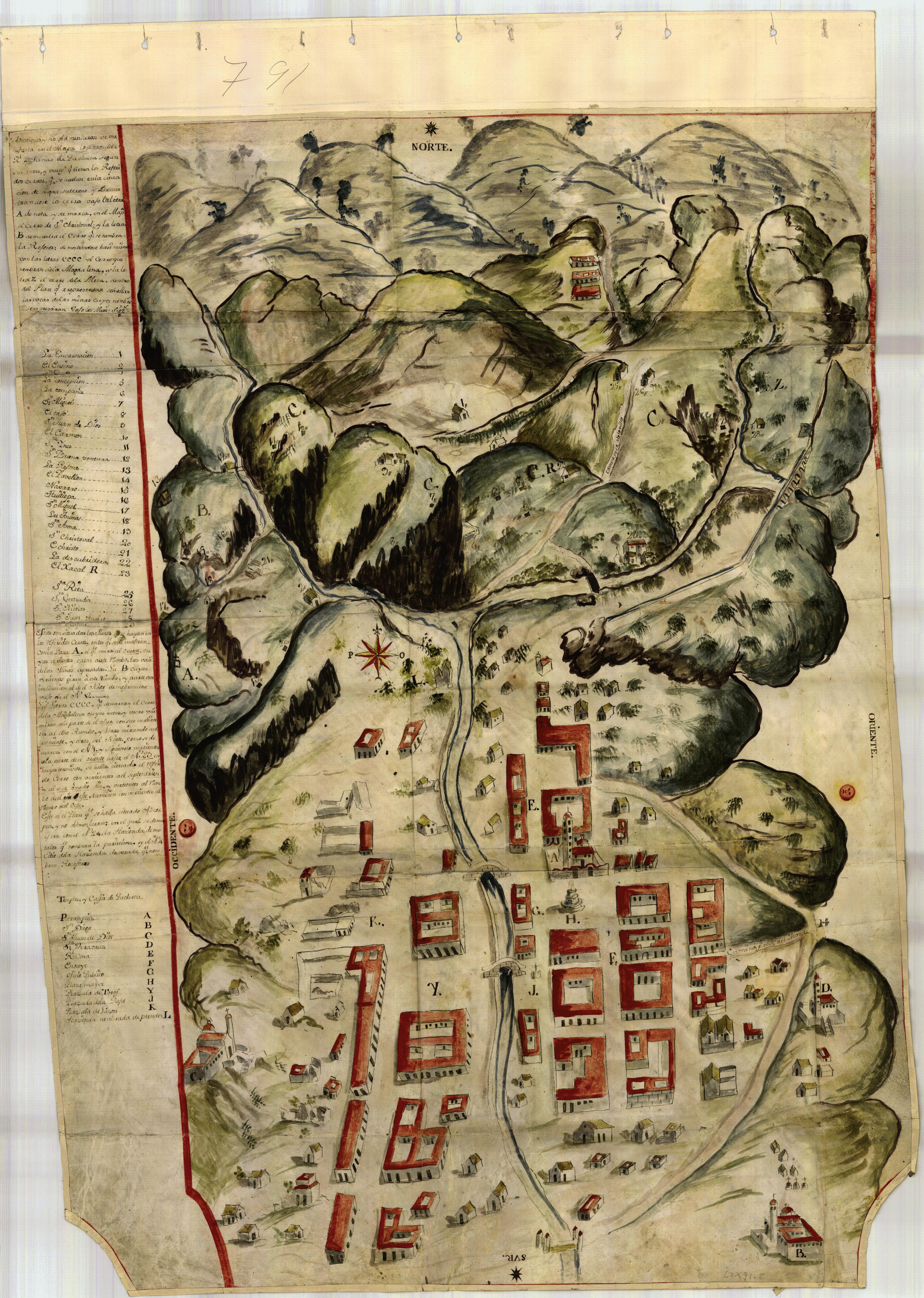
Map of the hills of the Royal Mines of Pachuca, 1750

All of Pachuca’s mines worked silver ore which was dressed using the patio process, similar to at Real Del Monte. The last mine to close was El Álamo in 1993, whilst several owned by the Real del Monte Company are still active.

- Rosario Mine (20.138894°N 98.722355°W)
- El Álamo Mine (20.110141°N 98.729564°W)
- San Juan Mine (20.137171°N 98.727997°W)
- Corteza Mine (20.125649°N 98.719724°W)
- San Pedro la Rabia (20.138014°N 98.717952°W)

Two engine houses, built in the 1880s, survive at Mina Corteza and Mina San Pedro la Rabia.

== Twin towns – sister cities ==
- Ponferrada, Spain
- Little Rock, Arkansas, United States
- (United Kingdom) Camborne, Cornwall, UK
- Eagle Pass, Texas, United States

== Notable residents ==
- Antonio Carrera (born 2004), footballer who represented the United States at a youth level
- Nico Carrera (born 2002), footballer who represented the United States and Mexico at a youth level
- María Fassi (born 1999), professional golfer
- Mara Reyes (born 1977), racing driver
- Berta Zerón (1924–2000), aviator

== See also ==
- Cornish pasty
- Paste
