= Humberto Lugo Gil =

Mexican politician

Governor of Hidalgo
- In office 28 October 1998 – 31 March 1999
- Preceded by: Jesús Murillo Karam
- Succeeded by: Manuel Ángel Núñez Soto

President of the Chamber of Deputies
- In office 1 September 1982 – 30 September 1982
- Preceded by: Marco Antonio Aguilar Cortés
- Succeeded by: Óscar Ramírez Mijares

Member of the Chamber of Deputies for Hidalgo's 5th district
- In office 1 September 1982 – 31 August 1985
- Preceded by: José Guadarrama Márquez
- Succeeded by: José Gonzalo Badillo Ortíz
- In office 1 September 1967 – 31 August 1970
- Preceded by: Jaime López Peimbert
- Succeeded by: Enrique Soto Resendiz

Personal details
- Born: 4 May 1934; Huichapan, Hidalgo
- Died: 9 May 2013 (aged 79); Mexico City, Mexico
- Political party: Institutional Revolutionary Party (PRI)
- Spouse: Luz del Carmen Guerrero
- Profession: Lawyer, politician

Humberto Alejandro Lugo Gil (4 May 1934 – 9 May 2013) was a Mexican politician from the Institutional Revolutionary Party (PRI). He served in the Chamber of Deputies and the Senate and as the interim governor of Hidalgo.

Humberto Lugo Gil was born into a prominent political family from Huichapan, Hidalgo. He was related to the governors Bartolomé Vargas Lugo, José Lugo Guerrero (his father), Javier Rojo Gómez, Jorge Rojo Lugo, and Adolfo Lugo Verduzco.

During his political career he held numerous official positions: general secretary of the National Confederation of Popular Organizations (CNOP) in 1979–1983, general manager of Aeropuertos y Servicios Auxiliares during the government of Miguel de la Madrid, two-time federal deputy (1967–1970 and 1982–1985, for Hidalgo's fifth district on both occasions), and two-time senator for Hidalgo (1976–1982 and 1988–1994). In 1982, during his second term as a deputy, he was elected president of the Chamber of Deputies and, in that capacity, he gave the official reply to the State of the Nation report in which President José López Portillo announced the nationalization of the country's private banks.

Following the resignation of Jesús Murillo Karam, he was appointed the interim governor of Hidalgo (1998–1999).

Lugo Gil died on 9 May 2013 in Mexico City.

Political offices
Preceded by Jesús Murillo Karam	Governor of Hidalgo; 1998–1999	Next: Manuel Ángel Núñez Soto
