= Valerio de la Cruz =

Indigenous Mexican conquistador

Juan Bautista Valerio de la Cruz (June 24, 1517 – 1589) was an Indigenous Mexican conquistador. He led soldiers in the Spanish conquest of territory from Chichimeca peoples and was later made governor of the province of Jilotepec in early New Spain.

== Early life ==
Juan Bautista Valerio de la Cruz was born Xicalchalchílmitl in Texcoco. He was the descendant of the famous Texcocan poet-king (or tlatoani) Nezahualcóyotl. After the Spanish occupation of Mexico, Xicalchalchílmitl was baptized by the city attorney of Mexico City, Don Bernardino de Santa Clara. According to the Jilotepec Codex, he received the name "Juan Bautista" because he was born on the feast day of John the Baptist (June 24), the name "Valerio" from his uncle, and the appellation "de la Cruz" because he arrived in Jilotepec on the day of the Day of the Cross (May 3).

In 1527, when de la Cruz was 10 years old, he joined the royal militia and by 1529 he had been promoted to lieutenant of the royal guard of lance and shield. After two more years of service, de la Cruz retired to cultivate his land in Texcoco.

== Military command ==
De la Cruz returned to royal service in 1534 and was sent to occupy the then-frontier city of Jilotepec with 80 Spanish arquebusiers and 400 indigenous archers. In particular he was to protect the road to Zacatecas, one of the primary sources of Mexican silver. His other responsibilities were to contain the Chichameca incursions in the region, and maintain peace with the local indigenous population.

Don Antonio de Mendoza, first viceroy of New Spain, ordered de la Cruz to raise an army and conquer territory where Chichameca tribes lived. Along with other local caciques — notably Fernando de Tapia (Conín) and Nicolás de San Luis — he would go on to conquer the territory around "Jilotepec, Tula, San Miguel el Grande, Querétaro, Valle de San Felipe, Xichú, Río Verde, Nueva Galicia, [and] Michoacán."

Cross of the Order of Santiago

According to the Jilotepec Codex, de la Cruz actively reduced the number of smaller settlements, and evangelized to and converted the local Chichameca population. This was part of the Spanish strategy of conquest. By reducing the number of nomadic natives and relocating them into pueblos, the Spanish were reducing the number of potential soldiers for the Chichamecas, hastening the work of conversion, and facilitating extraction of wealth. It was said of him "nunca mostrar cariño a los indios y tenerlos muy sujetos [he never showed affection to the natives and had them very subjugated]." The Jilotepec Codex also suggests that de la Cruz was actively working with the Franciscans in their work of conversion.

Valerio de la Cruz's work was so successful in the region that around 1540 he was elected to governor of the province, and by 1545 Mendoza had conferred upon him the title of Captain of the Great Chichameca. In 1550 he was named cacique and lord of Jilotepec. And in 1559, Luís de Velasco (second Viceroy of New Spain) named him Captain-General of the Chichamecas, replacing Nicolás de San Luis Montañés to lead the local Otomi people against the Chichamecas. Further, de la Cruz was granted a coat of arms by Holy Roman Emperor Carlos V and permission to don the cross and habit of the Order of Santiago by Felipe II of Spain.

== Charity ==
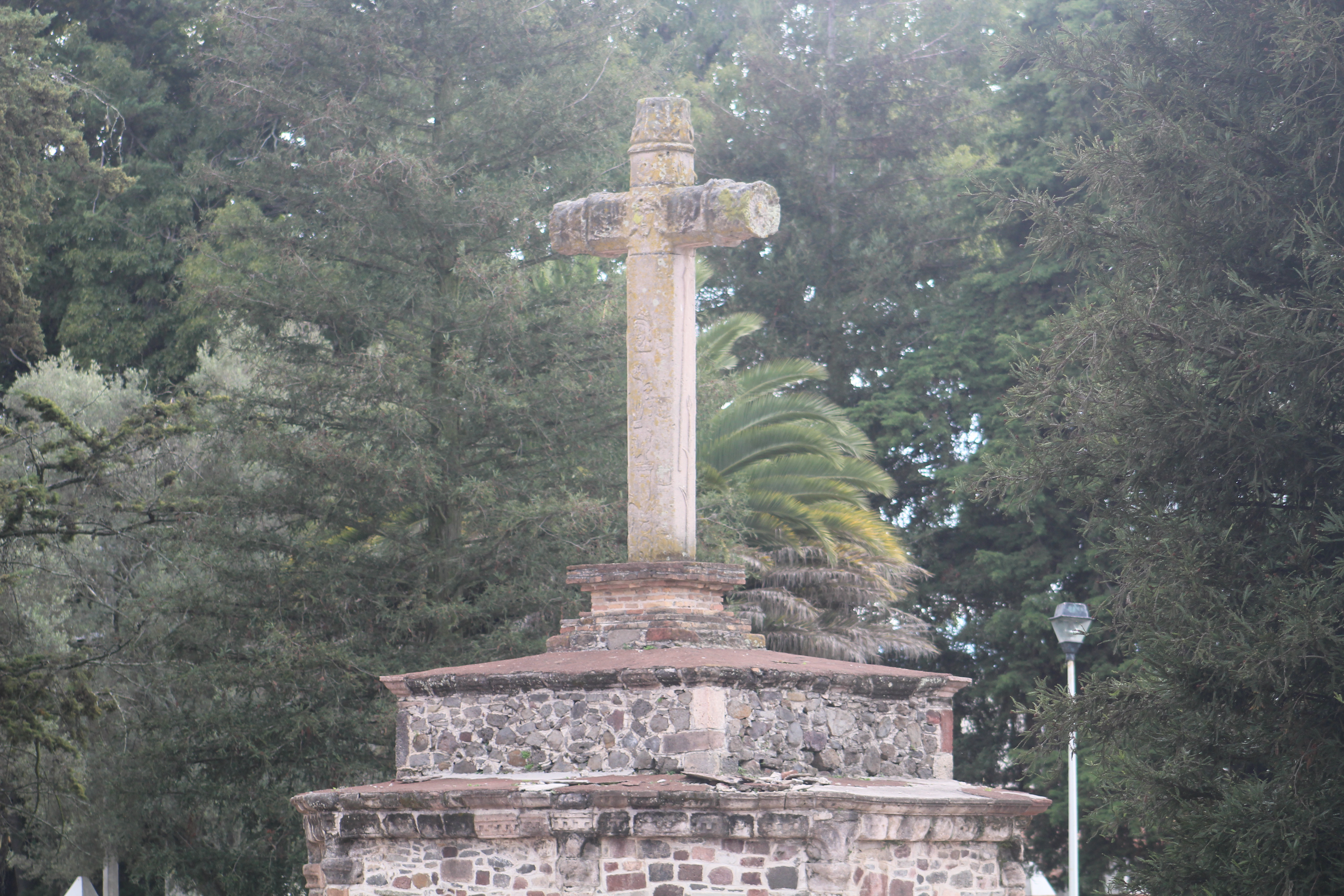
Cruz del Atrio of Jilotepec

During his time in the Jilotepec region, de la Cruz undertook many charitable acts. In 1565, thanks to the work of de la Cruz, the construction of the open chapel in Jilotepec (Nuestra Señora de la Limpia Concepción) began. Its use was intended primarily for the local indigenous population. It measured 47 x 27 meters and was one of the largest open chapels of its time.

He is credited with the construction of the first churches in Jilotepec (La Parroquia de San Pedro y San Pablo), Tula (La Catedral de San José), and Huichapan (Parroquia de San Mateo Apóstol). He constructed the Cruz del Doendó and reconstructed Jilotepec's Atrial Cross in front of the Church of Saint Peter and Saint Paul, two of Jilotepec's iconic stone crosses.

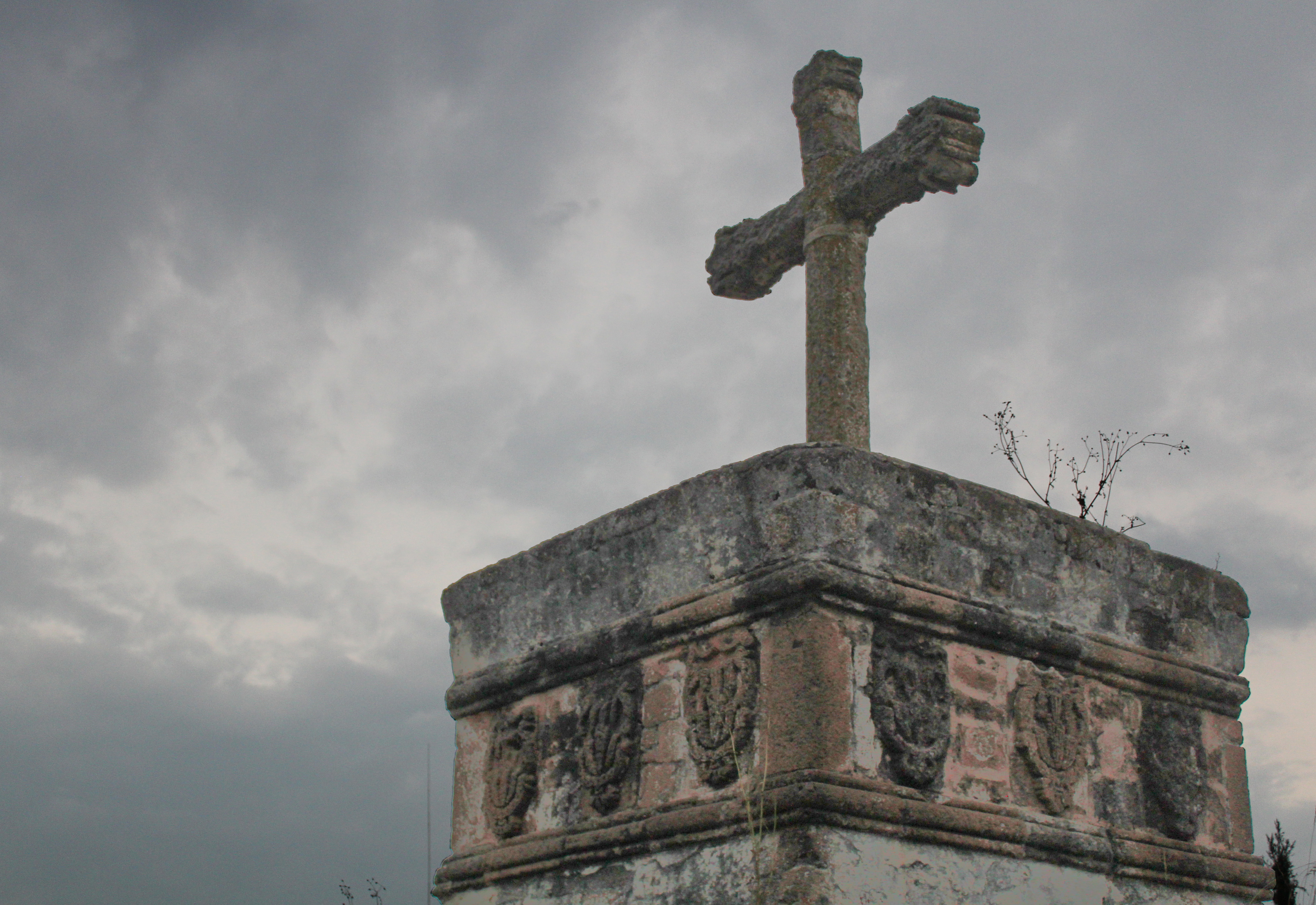
Cruz de Doendó in Jilotepec, Mexico

In 1569 he began construction on multiple bridges in the region, notably in Jilotepec and Tula, to facilitate traffic on the Camino Real.

== Death ==
Don Juan Bautista Valerio de la Cruz died in Jilotepec in 1589 and was buried with "ostentation," "pomp, and solemnity" by order of the Viceroy in the Convent of Santiago in Tlatelolco, Mexico.
