= Carmen Dorantes Martínez =

Mexican Institutional Revolutionary Party politician

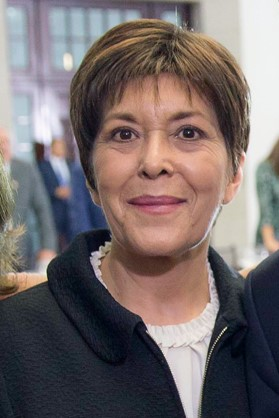
- Dorantes Martínez in July 2017

Senator of the Congress of the Union from Hidalgo
- In office 29 August 2015 – 31 August 2018
- Preceded by: David Penchyna Grub
- Succeeded by: Julio Menchaca

Personal details
- Born: 16 July 1957; Huichapan, Hidalgo, Mexico
- Political party: PRI
- Education: Universidad Autónoma Metropolitana; Latin American Faculty of Social Sciences; Universidad Autónoma del Estado de Hidalgo
- Occupation: Politician

Carmen Dorantes Martínez (born 16 July 1957) is a Mexican Institutional Revolutionary Party politician who served as a senator from the state of Hidalgo in the Senate of the Republic as part of the LXIII Legislature of the Mexican Congress from 2015 to 2018. She was previously the general director of the Hidalgo Women's Institute, the Coordinator of Support for Hidalguenses in the State and Abroad, and a delegate of the State Delegate in Hidalgo of the Ministry of Agriculture, Livestock, Rural Development, Fisheries and Food.

== Biography ==
On 16 July 1957, Dorantes Martínez was born in Huichapan, Hidalgo, Mexico. She graduated from the Universidad Autónoma Metropolitana with a bachelor's degree in biology. Dorantes Martínez went on to earn a master's degree in Comparative Public Policies from the Latin American Faculty of Social Sciences. She was employed as a Specialist in Educational Policy and Management at the Latin American Faculty of Social Sciences and then as a Specialist in Personnel Administration at the Universidad Autónoma del Estado de Hidalgo.

From 1981 to 1990, Dorantes Martínez worked as an adviser to the Department of Support for State Population Councils, CONAPO, conducting coordination in the National Program for the Integration of Women in Development and advised the State Population Councils. She was appointed a Delegate in Hidalgo of the National Council for Educational Development in 1990. Dorantes Martínez coordinated educational programs and strategies that would provide guarantees of performing Community Education and directed the rural population sector that have not received attention from other educational sectors. She left the post on 15 May 2005. On 16 May 2005, Dorantes Martínez became general director of the Hidalgo Women's Institute until 15 July 2011, leading the establishment and conducting policies set towards at the institutionalisation of the gender perspective as the guiding axis of the Public Administration of the State.

She served as general Coordinator of Support for Hidalguenses in the State and Abroad between 16 July 2011 and 15 March 2012. Dorantes Martínez setup and conducted policies aimed at the comprehensive care of Hidalguenses overseas and their families in their local communities. She was appointed delegate of the State Delegate in Hidalgo of the Ministry of Agriculture, Livestock, Rural Development, Fisheries and Food in the state of Hidalgo in February 2013. Dorantes Martínez managed, promoted and coordinated with the separate institutions of the agricultural field sector programmes supporting the producers and organisations in Hidalgo. In 2015, she was a panellist in regional meetings for the exchange of innovations and technologies applied in the Fishing and Aquaculture Sector.

Dorantes Martínez was elected to serve as a Institutional Revolutionary Party senator for Hidalgo in the Senate of the Republic as part of the LXIII Legislature of the Mexican Congress on 31 August 2016, replacing David Penchyna Grub, and she took up her seat on 8 March 2016. She was on the Commission for Rural Development as a secretary, was a member of each of the Commission for Communications and Transportation; Commission for Culture; Commission for Treasury and Public Credit; Commission for For Gender Equality and the Commission for Third Work Commission: Treasury and Public Credit; Agriculture and Development; Communications; and, Public Works. Dorantes Martínez left the Senate on 31 August 2018.

She supported the campaign of Omar Fayad for Governor of Hidalgo in June 2016, saying she saw a campaign of commitment and unity that was characteristic of Hidalgo's citizens. Dorantes Martínez supported the 2016 initiative to adjust the Constitution of Mexico to make every Mexico public institution provide disabled people better accessibility and continue protecting their rights. In April 2017, she asked the Mexico City government for a detailed report of traffic violations for analysis of its effectiveness in reducing accidents and in the collection of money in 2016. Dorantes Martínez proposed to the Secretariat of Infrastructure, Communications and Transportation the foundation of a publicly-accessible digital National Atlas of Road Risk to stop criminal incidence and guarantee user safety.

She presented a point of agreement to rehabilitate Mexico's national beach water for fishing and commerce by creating awareness to swimmers of their sustainable use. Dorantes Martínez voted to pass the General Law of Social Communication into law in April 2018. In June 2018, Dorantes Martínez asked Mexico's federal and state governments to include in their 2019 Expenditure Budget proposals resources for the support of gender equality and asked the Chamber of Deputies and local Congresses to approve gender budgets for the advancement towards substantive equality between men and women in compliance with the 2030 Agenda's Sustainable Development Goals. She demanded PROFECO better surveillance mechanisms and sanction the unjustified increases of the prices of products.
