= Gabriela Salas Cabrera =

Mexican programmer, data scientist

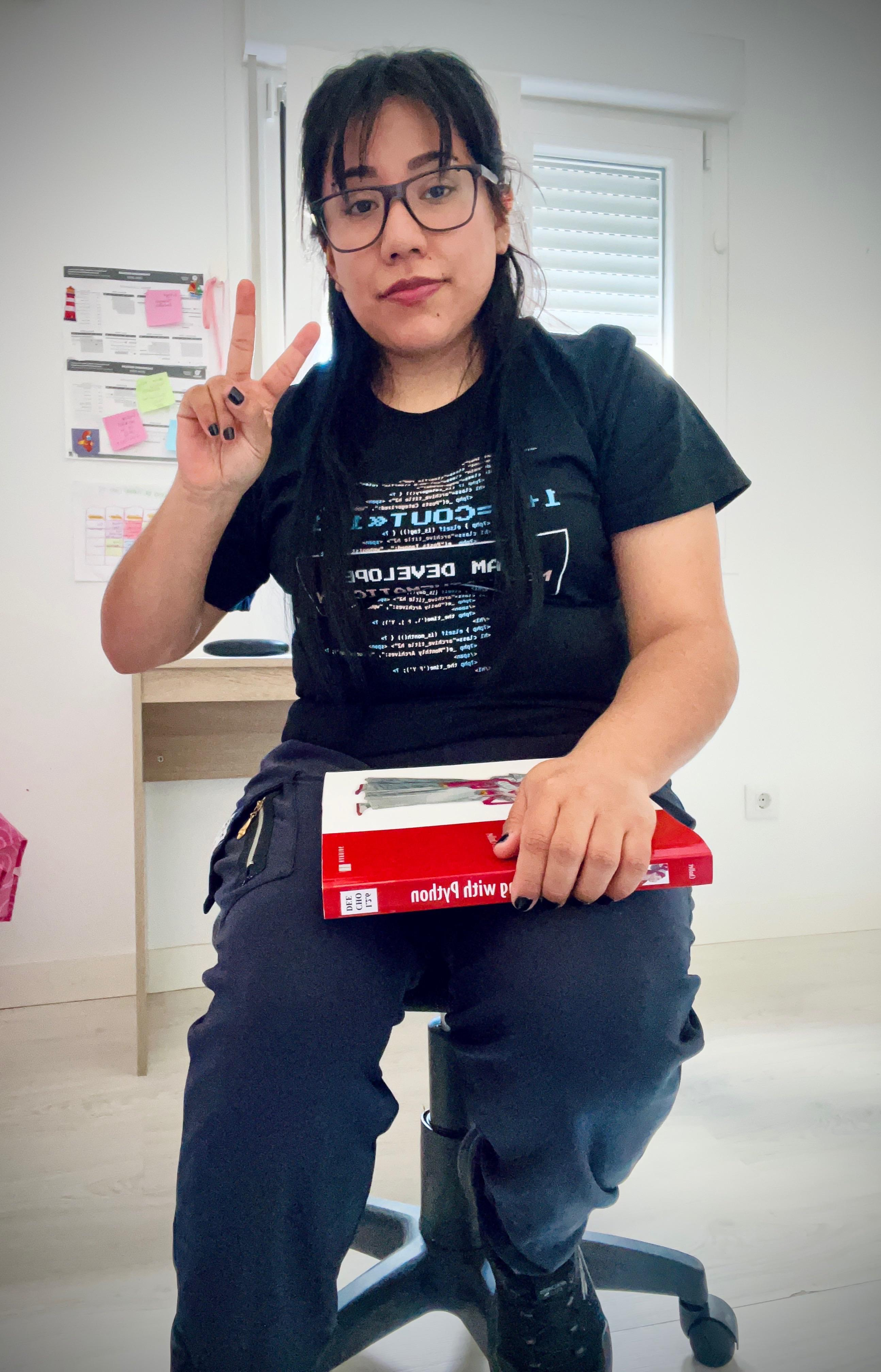
- Salas in 2025
- Born: Puerto del Caballo, Mexico
- Education: Universidad Tecnológica de Tula-Tepeji; Universidad Abierta y a Distancia de México
- Known for: Mexican programmer, data scientist, and advocate for the preservation of indigenous languages
- Notable work: Integrating the Náhuatl language into Google Translate.
- Honours: BBC 100 Women recognized Salas Cabrera one of the 100 most influential women in the world in December 2024.

Gabriela Salas Cabrera is a Mexican programmer, data scientist, and advocate for the preservation of indigenous languages. She is known for her contribution to integrating the Náhuatl language into Google Translate.

== Early life and education ==
Salas Cabrera was born in Puerto del Caballo, a community in the municipality of Chapulhuacán, Hidalgo, Mexico. She earned a degree in Information Technology from the Universidad Tecnológica de Tula-Tepeji and later specialized in data science and artificial intelligence. As of 2024, she was pursuing a bachelor's degree in Mathematics at the Universidad Abierta y a Distancia de México.

== Career and contributions ==
In 2024, Salas Cabrera partnered with Google to integrate Náhuatl into Google Translate.

== Recognition ==
In December 2024, the BBC recognized Salas Cabrera by naming her one of the 100 most influential women in the world.
