= 5th federal electoral district of Hidalgo =

Federal electoral district of Mexico

Hidalgo's 5th
- Electoral district of the Chamber of Deputies of Mexico

- 5th district since 2005

Incumbent
- Member: Astrit Viridiana Cornejo
- Party: ▌Morena
- Congress: 66th (2024–2027)

District
- State: Hidalgo
- Head town: El Llano, Tula de Allende
- Coordinates: 20°03′N 99°21′W
- Covers: 10 municipalities: Atitalaquia, Atotonilco de Tula, Chapantongo, Huichapan, Nopala de Villagrán, Tepeji del Río de Ocampo, Tepetitlán, Tezontepec de Aldama, Tlaxcoapan, Tula de Allende
- PR region: Fourth
- Precincts: 214
- Population: 470,382 (2020 census)

The 5th federal electoral district of Hidalgo (Spanish: Distrito electoral federal 05 de Hidalgo) is one of the 300 electoral districts into which Mexico is divided for elections to the federal Chamber of Deputies and one of seven such districts in the state of Hidalgo.

It elects one deputy to the lower house of Congress for each three-year legislative period by means of the first-past-the-post system. Votes cast in the district also count towards the calculation of proportional representation ("plurinominal") deputies elected from the fourth electoral region. (Note: Between 2005 and 2023, Hidalgo was assigned to the fifth region.)

The current member for the district, elected in the 2024 general election, is Astrit Viridiana Cornejo Gómez of the National Regeneration Movement (Morena).

== District territory ==
Under the 2023 districting plan adopted by the National Electoral Institute (INE), which is to be used for the 2024, 2027 and 2030 federal elections, the district covers 214 electoral precincts (secciones electorales) across ten municipalities in the south-western portion of Hidalgo, adjacent to the states of Mexico and Querétaro:

- Atitalaquia, Atotonilco de Tula, Chapantongo, Huichapan, Nopala de Villagrán, Tepeji del Río de Ocampo, Tepetitlán, Tezontepec de Aldama, Tlaxcoapan and Tula de Allende.

Its head town (cabecera distrital), where results from individual polling stations are gathered together and tallied, is the El Llano neighbourhood of the city of Tula de Allende. The district reported a population of 470,382 in the 2020 census.

== Previous districting plans ==
Evolution of electoral district numbers
	1974	1978	1996	2005	2017	2023
Hidalgo	5	6	7	7	7	7
Chamber of Deputies	196	300				

2017–2022

Between 2017 and 2022, the district comprised the same 10 municipalities as in the 2023 plan.

2005–2017

Under the 2005 scheme, the district covered the same 10 municipalities.

1996–2005

The 1996 redistricting process created Hidalgo's 7th district. From 1996 to 2005, the 5th district covered 12 municipalities in the same part of the state:
- Ajacuba, Tetepango, Tlahuelilpan, Atitalaquia, Atotonilco de Tula, Chapantongo, Nopala de Villagrán, Tepeji del Río de Ocampo, Tepetitlán, Tezontepec de Aldama, Tlaxcoapan and Tula de Allende.

1978–1996

The districting scheme in force from 1978 to 1996 was the result of the 1977 electoral reforms, which increased the number of single-member seats in the Chamber of Deputies from 196 to 300. Under that plan, Hidalgo's seat allocation rose from five to six. The 5th district's head town was at Zimapán in the north-west of the state and it comprised 14 municipalities.
- Alfajayucan, Chapantongo, Chapulhuacán, Huichapan, Ixmiquilpan, Jacala, La Misión, Nicolás Flores, Nopala de Villagrán, Pacula, Pisaflores, Tasquillo, Tecozautla and Zimapán.

== Deputies returned to Congress ==
(Mexico) National parties
- Current
- PAN
- PRI
- PT
- PVEM
- MC
- Morena
- PAZ
- Somos
- Defunct or local only
- PLM
- PNR
- PRM
- PNM
- PP
- PPS
- PARM
- PFCRN
- CON
- PANAL
- PSD
- PES
- PES
- PRD

Hidalgo's 5th district
Election	Deputy	Party	Term	Legislature
1916	Rafael Vega Sánchez		1916–1917	Constituent Congress of Querétaro
1917	Rafael Vega Sánchez		1917–1918	27th Congress
1918	Narciso Paz		1918–1920	28th Congress
1920	Francisco de la Peña		1920–1922	29th Congress
1922	Fernando Herrera		1922–1924	30th Congress
1924	Artemio Basurto		1924–1926	31st Congress
1926	Fernando Herrera		1926–1928	32nd Congress
1928	Fernando Herrera		1928–1930	33rd Congress
1930	Juan Cruz Oropeza	Institutional Revolutionary Party	1930–1932	34th Congress
1932	José Lugo Guerrero	Institutional Revolutionary Party	1932–1934	35th Congress
1934	Ricardo de la Peña	Institutional Revolutionary Party	1934–1937	36th Congress
1937	José Lugo Guerrero	Institutional Revolutionary Party	1937–1940	37th Congress
1940	Alfonso Corona del Rosal	Institutional Revolutionary Party	1940–1943	38th Congress
1943	Adolfo Lugo Guerrero	Institutional Revolutionary Party	1943–1946	39th Congress
1946	Fernando Cruz Chávez	Institutional Revolutionary Party	1946–1949	40th Congress
1949	Quintín Rueda Villagrán; Luis de la Concha Paulín	Institutional Revolutionary Party	1949–1950; 1950–1951	41st Congress
1952	Antonio Ponce Lagos	Partido Nacionalista Mexicano	1952–1955	42nd Congress
1955	Miguel Gómez Méndoza	Institutional Revolutionary Party	1955–1958	43rd Congress
1958	Martiniano Martínez Álvarez	Institutional Revolutionary Party	1958–1961	44th Congress
1961	Jorge Rojo Lugo	Institutional Revolutionary Party	1961–1964	45th Congress
1964	Jaime López Peimbert	Institutional Revolutionary Party	1964–1967	46th Congress
1967	Humberto Lugo Gil	Institutional Revolutionary Party	1967–1970	47th Congress
1970	Enrique Soto Reséndiz	Institutional Revolutionary Party	1970–1973	48th Congress
1973	Ismael Villegas Rosas	Institutional Revolutionary Party	1973–1976	49th Congress
1976	Vicente Trejo Callejas	Institutional Revolutionary Party	1976–1979	50th Congress
1979	José Guadarrama Márquez	Institutional Revolutionary Party	1979–1982	51st Congress
1982	Humberto Lugo Gil	Institutional Revolutionary Party	1982–1985	52nd Congress
1985	José Badillo Ortiz	Institutional Revolutionary Party	1985–1988	53rd Congress
1988	Gregorio Bonilla Chávez	Institutional Revolutionary Party	1988–1991	54th Congress
1991	Germán Corona del Rosal	Institutional Revolutionary Party	1991–1994	55th Congress
1994	Miguel Ángel Islas Chío	Institutional Revolutionary Party	1994–1997	56th Congress
1997	Noé Paredes Salazar	Institutional Revolutionary Party	1997–2000	57th Congress
2000	Raúl Efrén Sicilia Salgado	Institutional Revolutionary Party	2000–2003	58th Congress
2003	Jorge Romero Romero	Institutional Revolutionary Party	2003–2006	59th Congress
2006	Fernando Moctezuma Pereda	Institutional Revolutionary Party	2006–2009	60th Congress
2009	Ramón Ramírez Valtierra; Marcela Vieyra Alamilla	Institutional Revolutionary Party	2009–2011; 2011–2012	61st Congress
2012	José Antonio Rojo García de Alba	Institutional Revolutionary Party	2012–2015	62nd Congress
2015	Fernando Moctezuma Pereda	Institutional Revolutionary Party	2015–2018	63rd Congress
2018	Julio César Ángeles Mendoza	National Regeneration Movement	2018–2021	64th Congress
2021	Cuauhtémoc Ochoa Fernández (Note: Ochoa Fernández left the PVEM for Morena on 28 September 2021.)	Ecologist Green Party of Mexico National Regeneration Movement	2021–2024	65th Congress
2024	Astrit Viridiana Cornejo Gómez	National Regeneration Movement	2024–2027	66th Congress

== Presidential elections ==
Hidalgo's 5th district
Election	District won by	Party or coalition	%
2018	Andrés Manuel López Obrador	Juntos Haremos Historia	62.7525
2024	Claudia Sheinbaum Pardo	Sigamos Haciendo Historia	70.9527
