= Marcela Vieyra Alamilla =

Mexican politician (1963–2019)

- Born: 26 December 1963; Tula de Allende, Hidalgo, Mexico
- Died: 2 March 2019 (aged 55)
- Education: UAEH
- Occupation: Politician
- Political party: PRI

Marcela Vieyra Alamilla (26 December 1963 – 2 March 2019) was a Mexican politician from the Institutional Revolutionary Party (PRI). Between 2011 and 2012, she served as a federal deputy during the 61st Congress, representing Hidalgo's fifth district and substituting for Ramón Ramírez Valtierra. She briefly served as a local deputy in the Congress of Hidalgo, before leaving the post to serve as a federal deputy.

Vieyra Alamilla died in March 2019.
