= Jorge Rojo Lugo =

Mexican politician and lawyer

Jorge Rojo Lugo (Huichapan, Hidalgo; 19 June 1933-Mexico City, 14 July 2010) was a Mexican lawyer and politician who was a member of the Institutional Revolutionary Party (PRI). He was governor of the state of Hidalgo and Secretary of Agrarian Reform in the government of José López Portillo, a member of the main political family in the state.

== Biography ==
Jorge Rojo Lugo was the son of Javier Rojo Gómez: governor of Hidalgo, head of the Federal District Department and candidate for the PRI candidacy for the presidency in 1946, and through marriages and political groups is connected to fellow governors Bartolomé Vargas Lugo, José Lugo Guerrero, Adolfo Lugo Verduzco and Humberto Lugo Gil. His sons, Jorge Rojo García de Alba and José Antonio Rojo García de Alba, have also had political careers.

Jorge Rojo Lugo became a lawyer after graduating from the National Autonomous University of Mexico. He began his political career when he was elected federal deputy for the fifth federal electoral district of Hidalgo in the XLV Legislature of 1961 to 1964, from 1965 to 1970 he was Deputy Director General of the National Mortgage Bank and from 1970 to 1975 he was Director General of the same institution; from 10 January 1975 he was Director General of the National Agricultural Bank by appointment of President Luis Echeverría Álvarez.

In mid-1975, in response to the declaration of disappearance of powers in Hidalgo on 29 April that same year, he was appointed as the PRI candidate for governor and was elected. He assumed the governorship on 7 September for a term that ended on 31 March 1981, for which Otoniel Miranda had originally been chosen. However, he requested leave from the governorship on 1 December 1976 when he was appointed Secretary of Agrarian Reform under President José López Portillo, remaining in office until 1 June 1978 when he returned to the governorship and concluded his term. After the end of his term he retired from active politics, although he continued to exercise political influence as leader of his political group.

He died in Mexico City on 14 July 2010 as a result of cancer.

== See also ==
- Javier Rojo Gómez
- Adolfo Lugo Verduzco
- Humberto Lugo Gil
- State elections in Hidalgo, 1975
- Cabinet of José López Portillo
