= Cuauhtémoc Ochoa Fernández =

Mexican politician

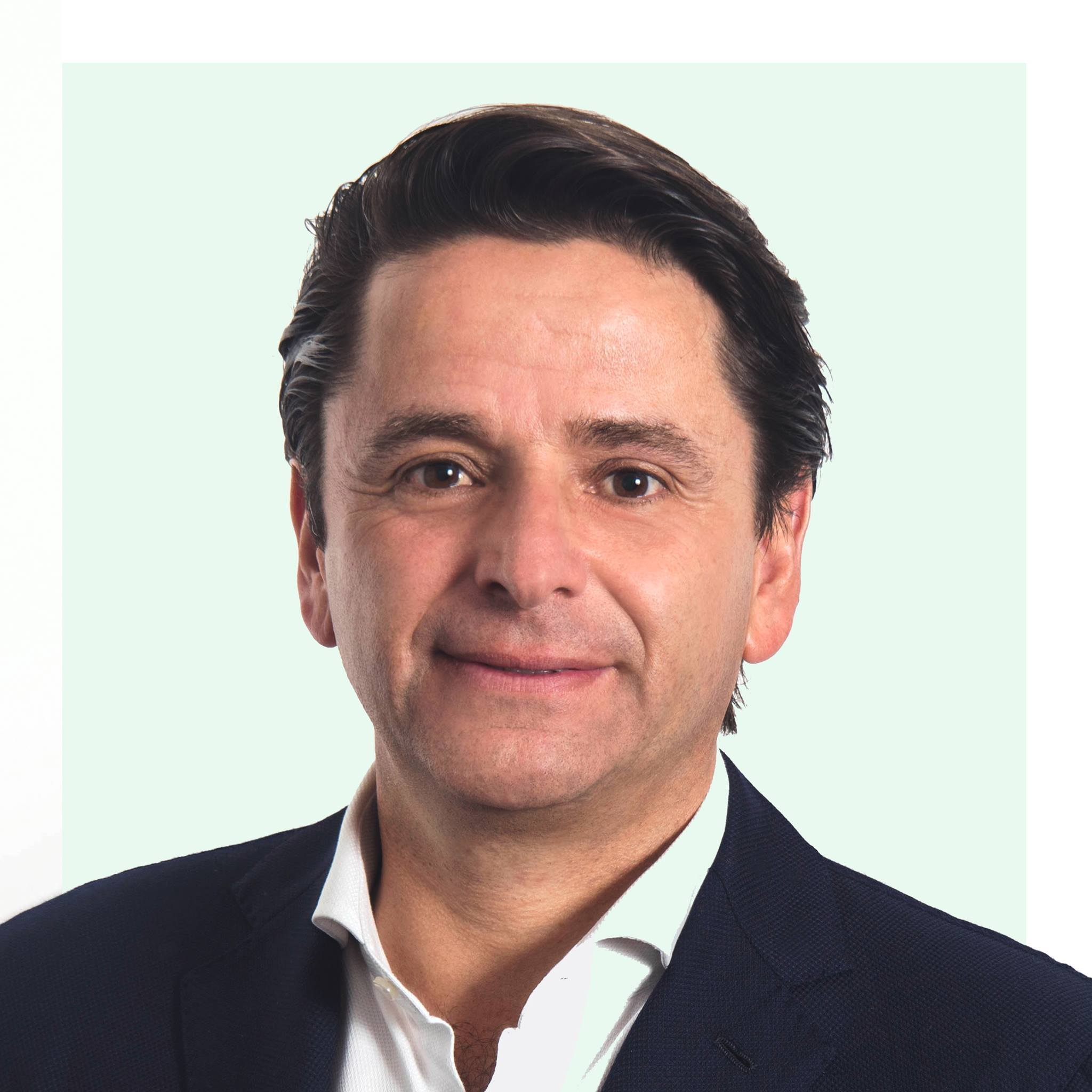
- Born: 1 December 1970 (age 54); Mexico City, Mexico

Cuauhtémoc Ochoa Fernández (born 1 December 1970) is a Mexican politician affiliated with the National Regeneration Movement (Morena). He has served in both chambers of Congress.

== Career ==
Ochoa was born in Mexico City in 1970. He graduated with a degree in civil engineering from the Universidad Iberoamericana and also holds a certificate in Administration and Finances from the Instituto Tecnológico Autónomo de México (ITAM).

After several years in various construction industry companies, Ochoa joined the Ecologist Green Party of Mexico (PVEM) in 1999. He ran unsuccessfully for the Hidalgo state congress in 2001 but was more successful at obtaining a seat in the 59th federal legislature in 2003. He was a secretary on five commissions, including several investigating oil prices, contract awards, and environmental damage caused by Pemex.

From 2007 to 2009, he was the state tourism secretary of Hidalgo; he then spent the next two years as the Secretary of Public Works, Communications, Transportation and Settlements. In 2012, he was tapped by incoming president Enrique Peña Nieto for a deputy secretary position in the Secretariat of Environment and Natural Resources.

Ochoa returned to the Chamber of Deputies in 2021, winning election as a Morena candidate in Hidalgo's 5th district (including Tula de Allende).

He won election as one of Hidalgo's senators in the 2024 Senate election, occupying the second place on the National Regeneration Movement's two-name formula.
