= Fernando Moctezuma Pereda =

Mexican politician (born 1956)

- Born: 9 April 1956 (age 70); Hidalgo, Mexico
- Occupation: Politician
- Political party: PRI

Fernando Quetzalcóatl Moctezuma Pereda (born 9 April 1956) is a Mexican politician affiliated with the Institutional Revolutionary Party (PRI).

He has served as a federal deputy twice: in 2006–2009 and in 2015–2018, representing Hidalgo's fifth district on both occasions. He previously served as the municipal president of Tula de Allende from 1991 to 1992 and as a local deputy in the Congress of Hidalgo from 1993 to 1996 and 2002 to 2005.
