= Tula de Allende =

Tula de Allende Mämeni (Otomian languages)
- Town and municipality
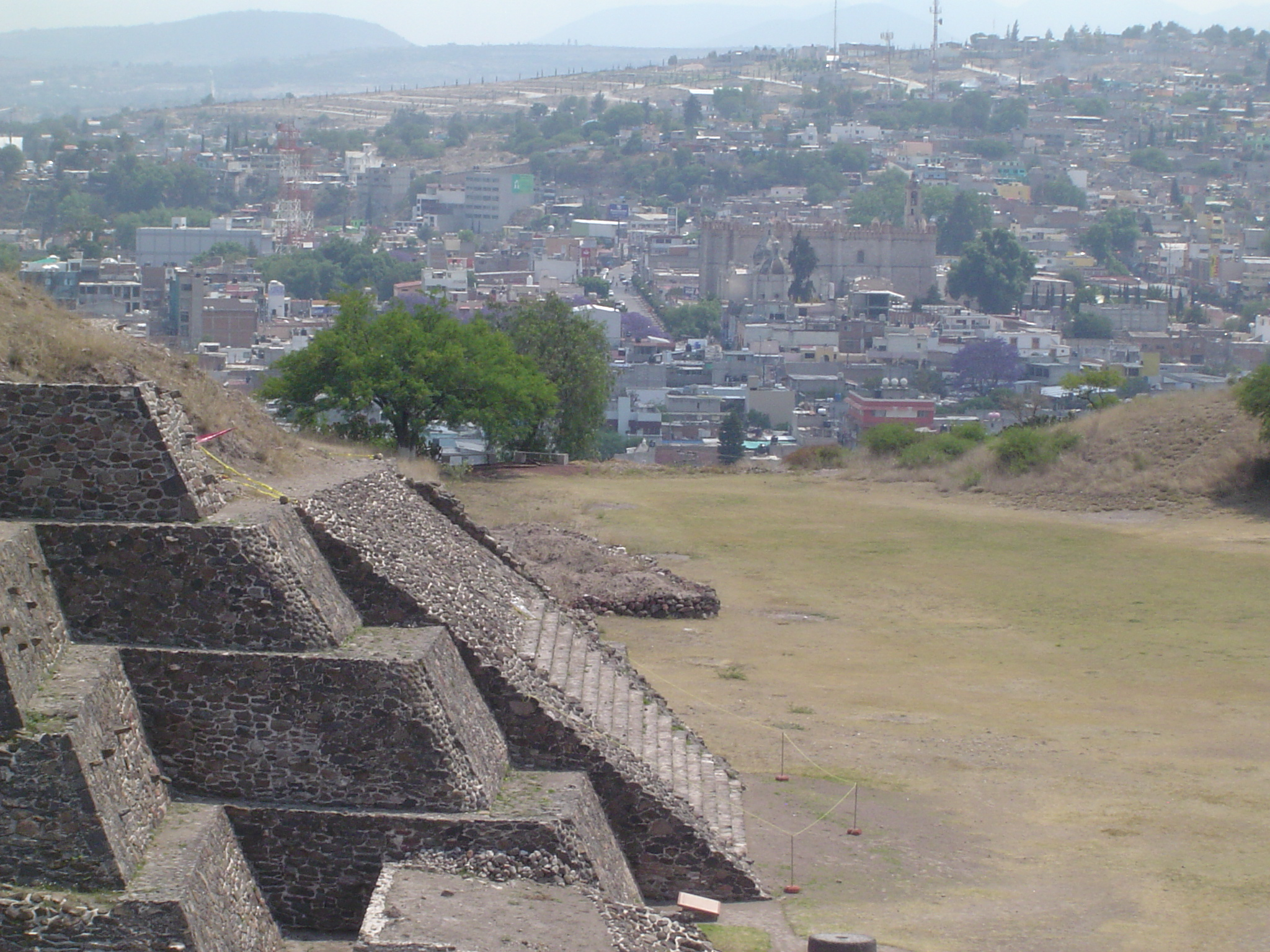

- Coat of arms

- Location within Mexico
- Coordinates: 20°03′N 99°21′W
- Country: Mexico
- State: Hidalgo
- Municipality: Tula de Allende

Government
  - Municipal President: Ismael Gadoth Tapia Benítez
  - Federal electoral district: Hidalgo's 5th

Area
  - Town and municipality: 305.8 km^{2} (118.1 sq mi)

Population (2010)
  - Town and municipality: 103,919
  - Metro: 188,659
- Time zone: UTC-6 (Zona Centro)
- Area code: 42800
- Website: tula.gob.mx

Tula de Allende (Otomi: Mämeni) is a town and one of the 84 municipalities of Hidalgo in central-eastern Mexico. The municipality covers an area of 305.8 km^{2} (118.07 sq mi), and as of 2010, the municipality had a total population of 103,919. The municipality includes numerous smaller outlying towns, the largest of which are El Llano, San Marcos, and San Miguel Vindho. It is a regional economic center and one of Mexico's fastest growing cities. However, it is best known as the home of the Tula archeological site, noted for its Atlantean figures. Its built-up area (or metro) made up of Atotonilco de Tula, Atitalaquia, Tlaxcoapan municipalities was home to 188,659 inhabitants at the 2010 census.

== City of Tula de Allende ==
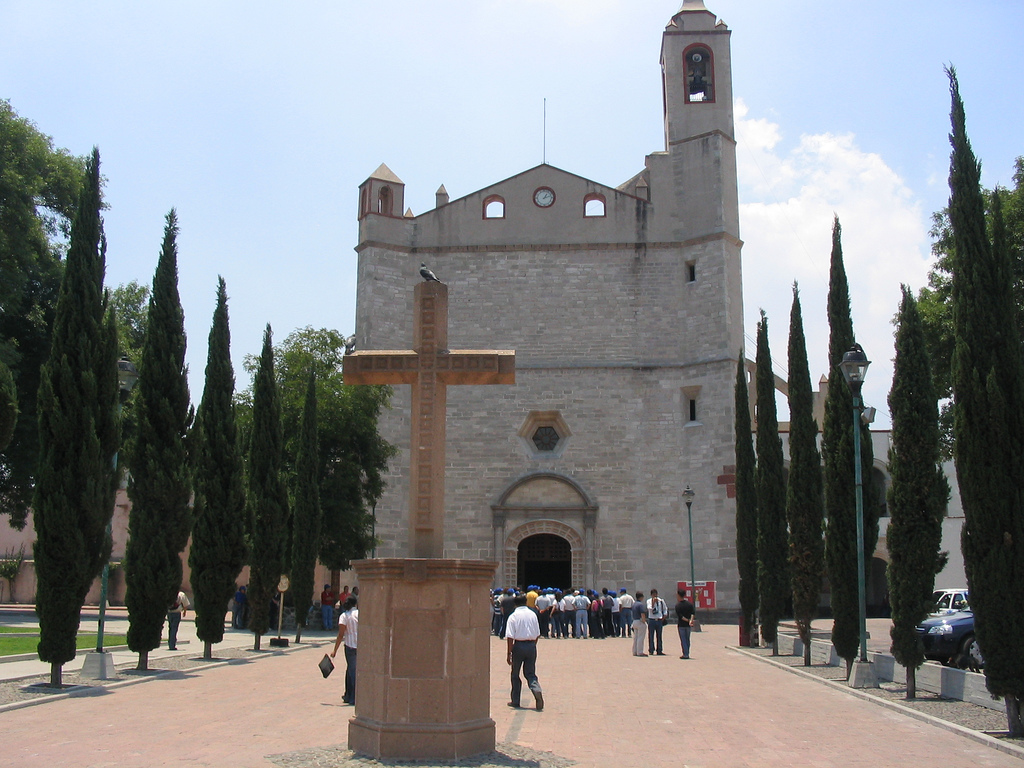
Facade of the parish and former monastery of San José

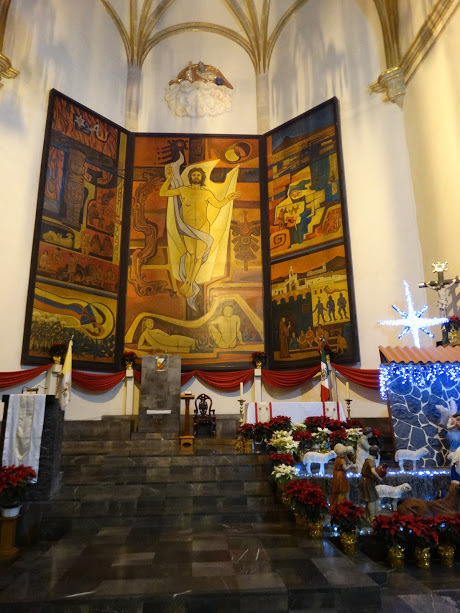
Altar in the Cathedral

The city of Tula de Allende was built on what was the southern extension of the ancient city of Tula, centered on a former monastery built by the Spanish in the 16th century. The modern city is still connected to the ancient ruins, which are an important tourist attraction as well as a symbol of the city, especially the warrior figures located on the Quetzalcoatl pyramid. Toltec finds are not uncommon underneath the modern city. In 2009, Toltec burials from 900-1100CE were found under Tula-Iturbe Boulevard along with several kilns for firing pottery.

The modern city is a regional economic center and has been listed as one of the fastest growing in Mexico by the National Commission of Population. Most of the reason for this is the existence of a refinery and a thermoelectric plant.

The city is centered around the parish and former monastery of San Jose, with the oldest part built between 1546 and 1556. The main facade has three arches, pilasters with reliefs, a curved pediment and a chapel annex that takes from the 17th century. The cloister of the monastery has two levels with arches and fresco murals. Inside the main church, there is a modern mural called "Jesus" located at the main altar. It was named a cathedral in 1961.

Near here is a main plaza and an open-air theatre, framed by a mural called "Tula Eterna" created by Juan Pablo Patiño Cornejo. Another mural called "Tianguis Mamehni" is found at the chamber of commerce. There is also the Plaza de las Artesanias dedicated to local handcrafts including replicas of the atlas figures.

== The municipality ==
The government of the city of Tula de Allende is also the government for a total of 76 communities. The city is the largest community, with a population of about 27,000. Other important communities include El Llano (11,000 people), San Miguel Vindho (10,500), San Marcos (10,400), Bomintzha (3,000), Santa Ana Ahuehuepan (2,600), Santa Maria Macua (1,750), Ignacio Zaragoza, (1,750), Nantzha (1740), Xochitlan de las Flores (1,300), Colonia San Francisco Bojay (1,250) and Monte Alegre (1,200). The government consists of a municipal president, fourteen administrators, 54 delegates and fourteen commissions.

== History ==
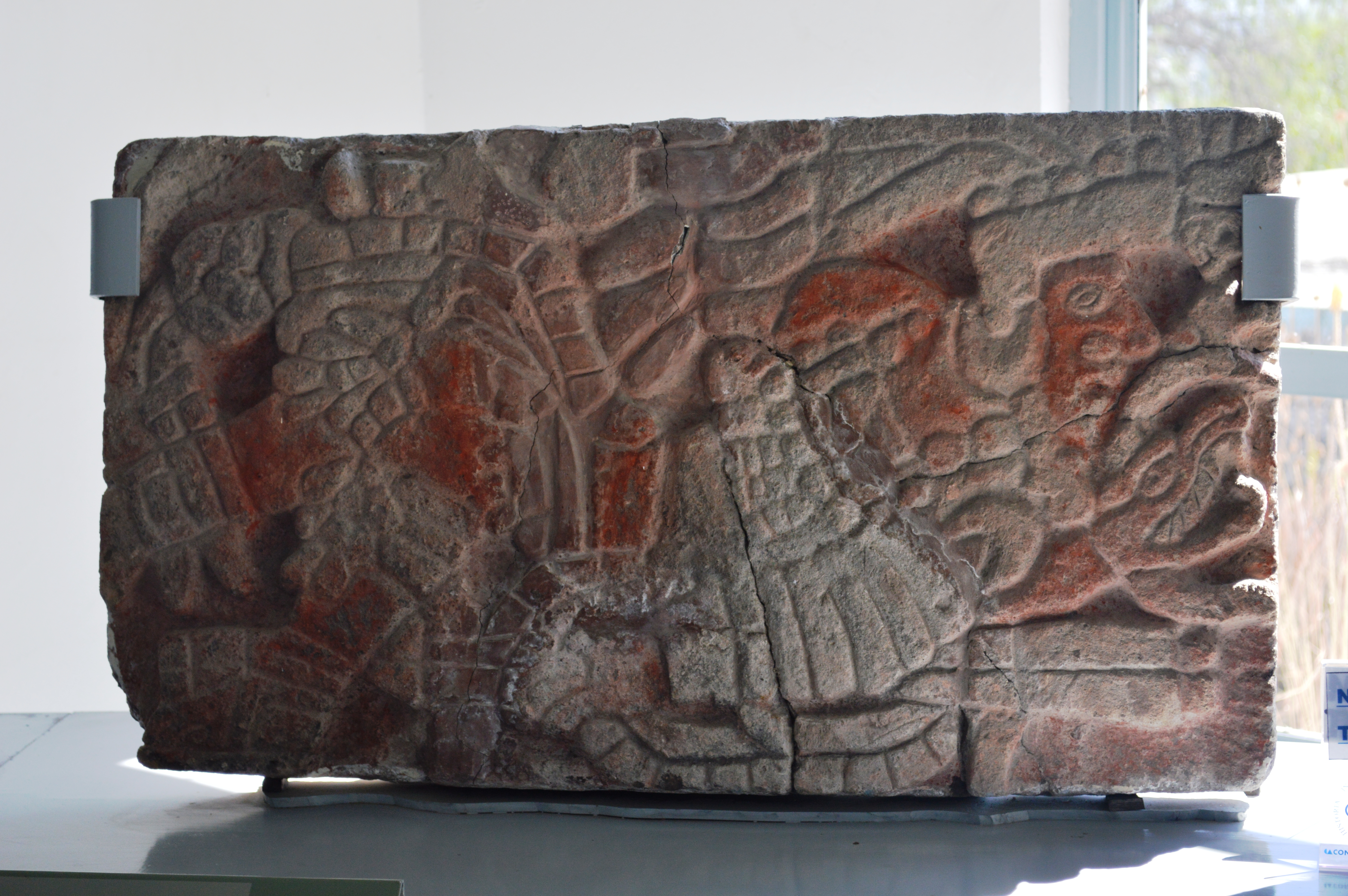
Image of Toltec ruler in relief from the Tula archeological site

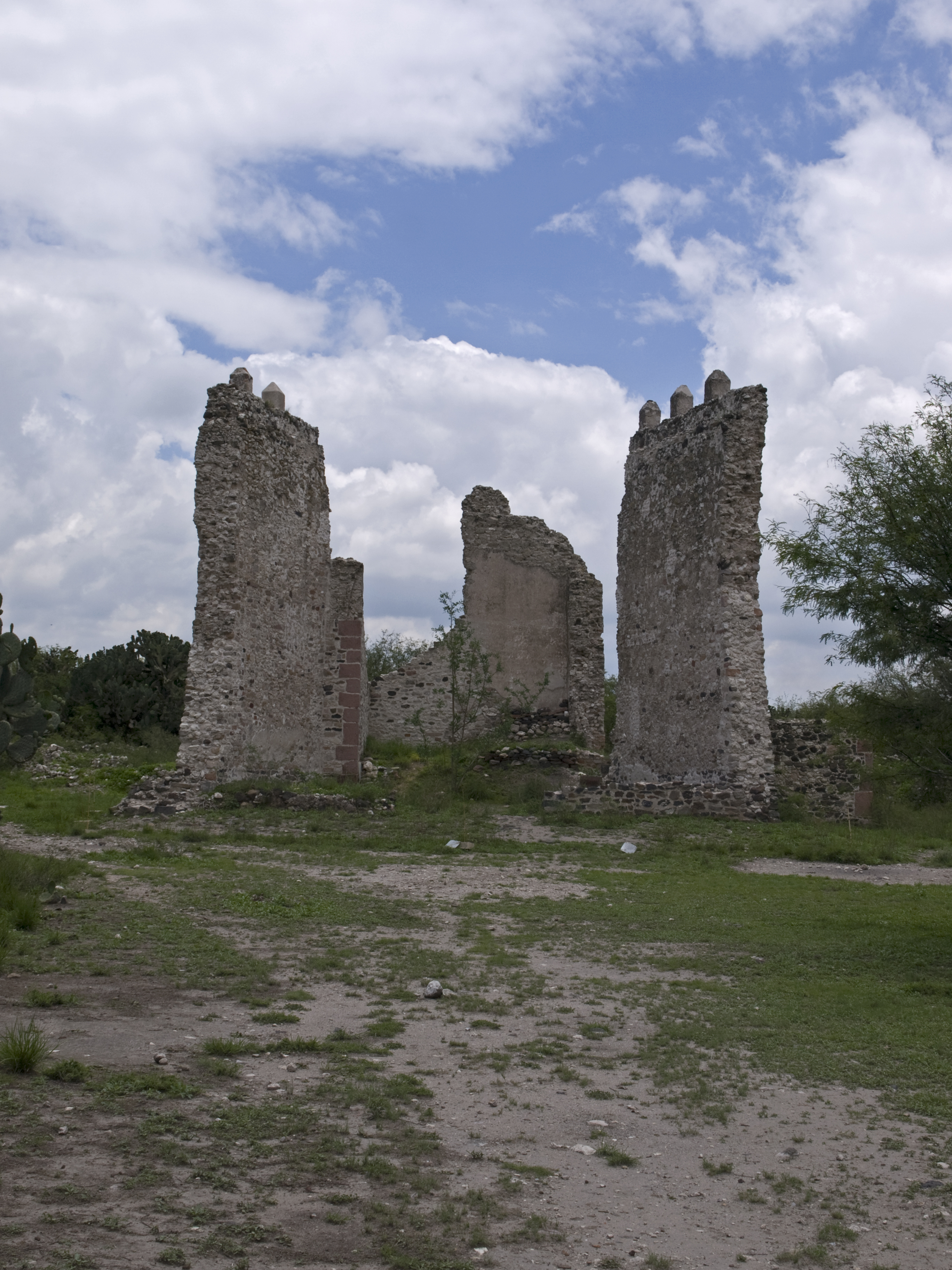
Ruins of the first Spanish Cathedral in Tula.

The name is derived from the Nahuatl phrase Tollan-Xicocotitlan, which means near where cattails grow. Tula is the Hispanicized pronunciation of Tollan. In the Otomi language the area is called Namehi, which means "place of many people". It was given the appendage of "de Allende" in honor of Ignacio Allende who fought in the Mexican War of Independence.

The area was the capital of one of the major civilizations of Mesoamerica, that of the Toltecs. The Toltecs rose to power after 713 CE as the successor to Teotihuacan. The current city is centered just south of the ceremonial center of the ancient city, which is famous for its Atlantean figures. The Toltec Empire reached as far south as the Valley of Mexico and its influence has been found in artifacts as far away as the current U.S. Southwest. It is believed that aguamiel was first extracted around 1100CE, which led to the making of pulque. The last Toltec ruler was Topilzin Ce-Acatl Quetzalcoatl who came to power in 1085.

According to the Codex Mendoza, the site was conquered under the reign of Tizoc and subsequently incorporated into the Aztec Empire

After the Spanish conquest of the Aztec Empire, Pedro Miahuazochil was named in 1531 as the lord of Tula helping to evangelize the area.

Tula became a municipality in 1871.

The Tula area was the scene of various battles during the Mexican Revolution, particularly between those loyal to Venustiano Carranza and those to Emiliano Zapata.

== Geography ==
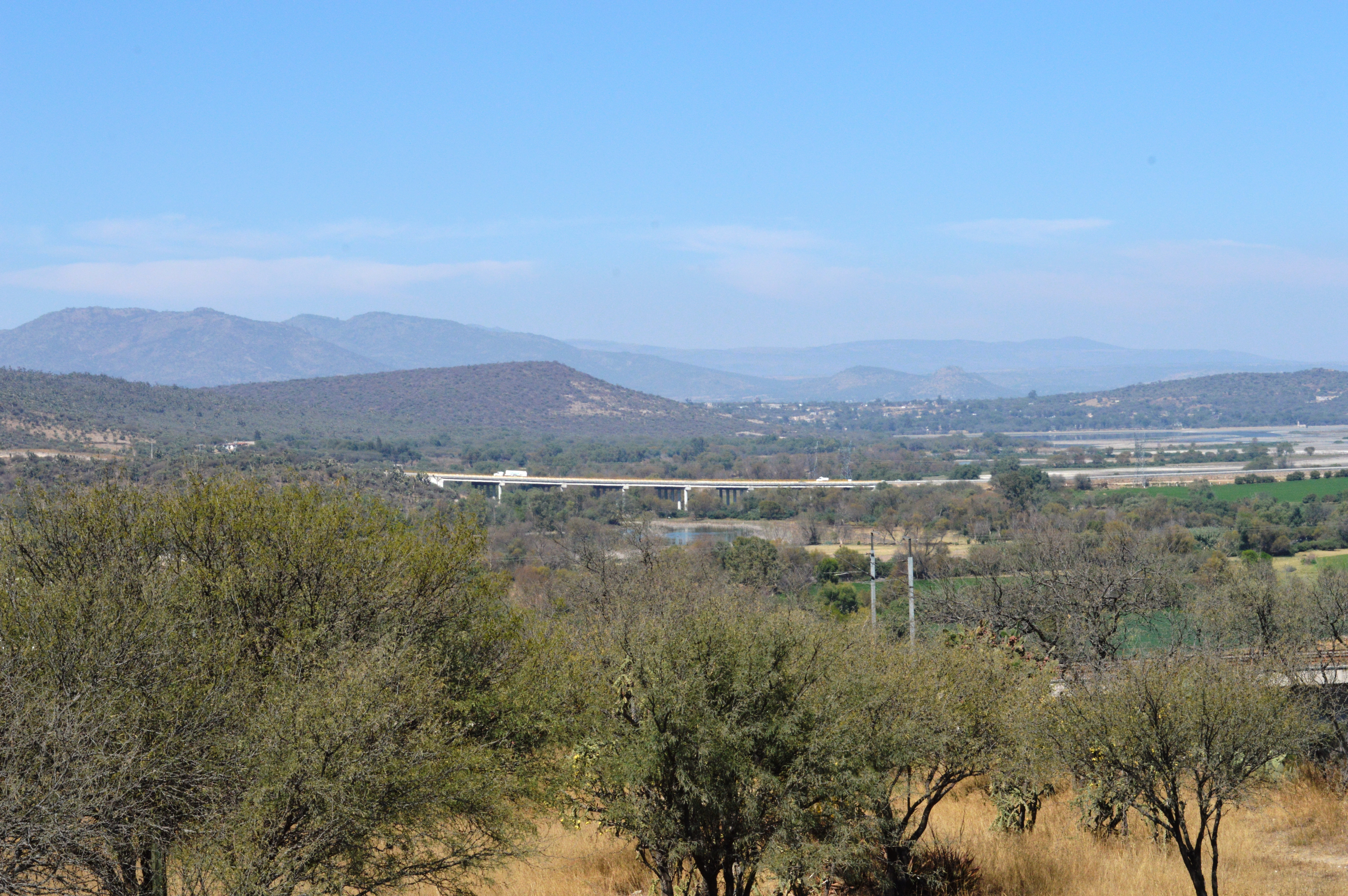
View of the Tula River from the archeological site.

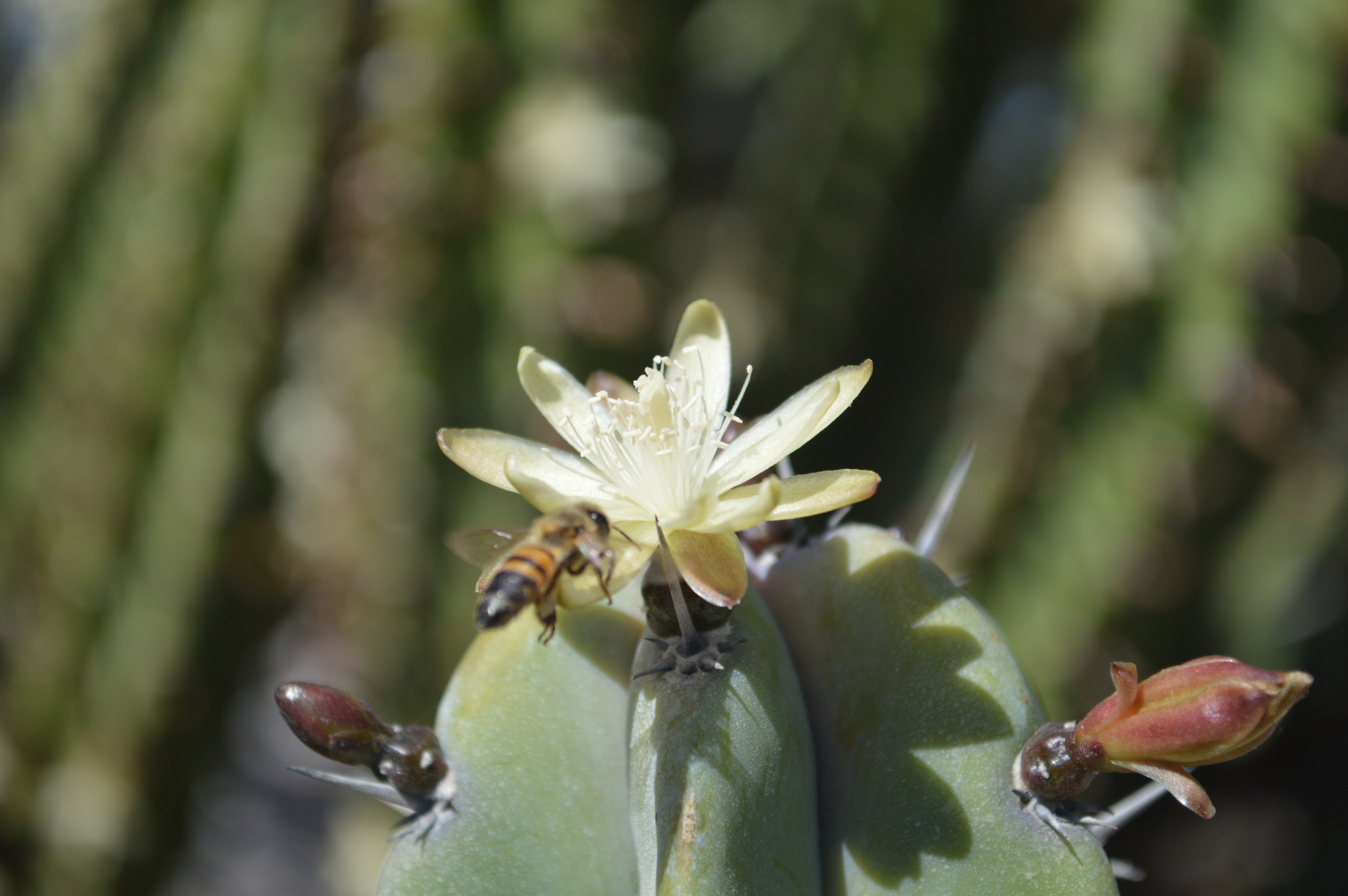
Garden in the archeological site

The municipality is located in the south of the Mezquital Valley in the southwest of the state of Hidalgo. With an extension of 305.8 km^{2} (118.1 sq mi) it borders the municipalities of Tepetitlán, Tlahuelilpan, Tepeji del Río, Atotonilco de Tula, Atitalaquía and Tlaxcoapan, with the State of Mexico to the west.

The city of Tula has an altitude of 2,020 meters above sea level Most of the municipality is semi flat with only one significant elevation completely in the municipality known as Magoni. Elevations in the west form the border between it and the State of Mexico. These include Magueni and La Malinche. In the north there is a small mountain of volcanic origin called Xicuco.

Surface water is mostly found in the Tula River, the Rosas River and the Arroyo Grande, whose waters are stored in the Endho Dam. The Tula River begins with the discharge from the Valley of Mexico which pass north through the State of Mexico before reaching the area. The Rosas River also begins in the State of Mexico but with clean waters from a fresh water spring. It has carved some small canyons in the area.

Pollution problems generally come from the PEMEX refinery and the discharge of wastewater from the Valley of Mexico into the Tula River.

=== Flora and fauna ===
The natural vegetation is mostly semi desert, with cactus and maguey plants the most defining followed by mesquite and the pirul tree (Schinus molle) along with seasonal grass. Native fauna includes rabbits, squirrels, chameleons, roadrunners, coyotes, various kinds of birds and snakes, skunks and opossums.

=== Climate ===
The municipality's climate varies from temperate to cold with an average annual temperature of 17.6 °C (63.7 °F). It has an average annual rainfall of 699 mm (27.5 in), with most rain falling from May to September.

== Politics ==
Mayor	Time
Rodolfo Paredes Carbajal	2009–2012
Jaime Jacobo Allende González	2012–2016
Ismael Gadoth Tapia Benítez	2016–2020

== Economy ==
Marketplace in Tula 1932. Photo by Sigvald Linné

The city and municipality have a very low level of socioeconomic marginalization but median household income varies between US$10,641 and $5,037 a year. The city is a regional economic center. The nucleus of its economic sphere includes the municipalities of Tula de Allende, Atitalaquuia, Atotonilco de Tula, Chapantongo and Nopala de Villagrán. Other municipalities which are affected include Tepetitlán, Tepeji del Río, Tlahualilpan, Tlaxcoapan, Tezontepec de Aldama, Soyaniquilpan de Juárez and Jilotepec.

Of the economically active population (minus students and retirees), just under ten percent work in agriculture and livestock; just over 33 percent work in manufacturing and mining and about 55 percent work in commerce, services and tourism. 97% of the land is held in common, generally in ejidos, for agricultural purposes. The main crops are corn, beans, oats, wheat, vegetables such as squash, tomatillos and chili peppers, alfalfa, nopal cactus, cactus fruit, peaches and avocados. Livestock includes sheep, goats, cattle and pigs along with domestic fowl. Fishing is mostly limited to sporting catching carp and catfish.

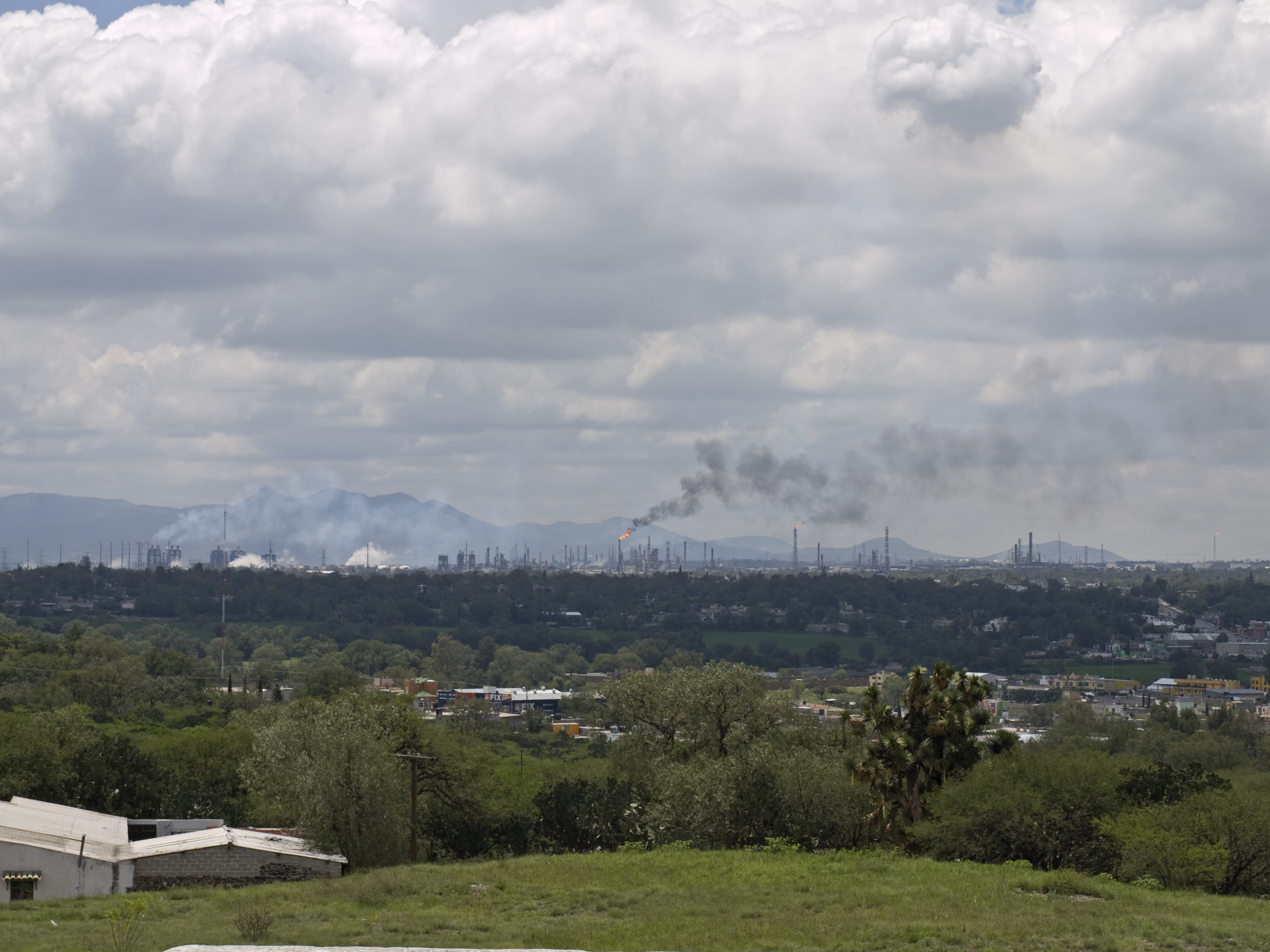
Refinery in Tula de Allende

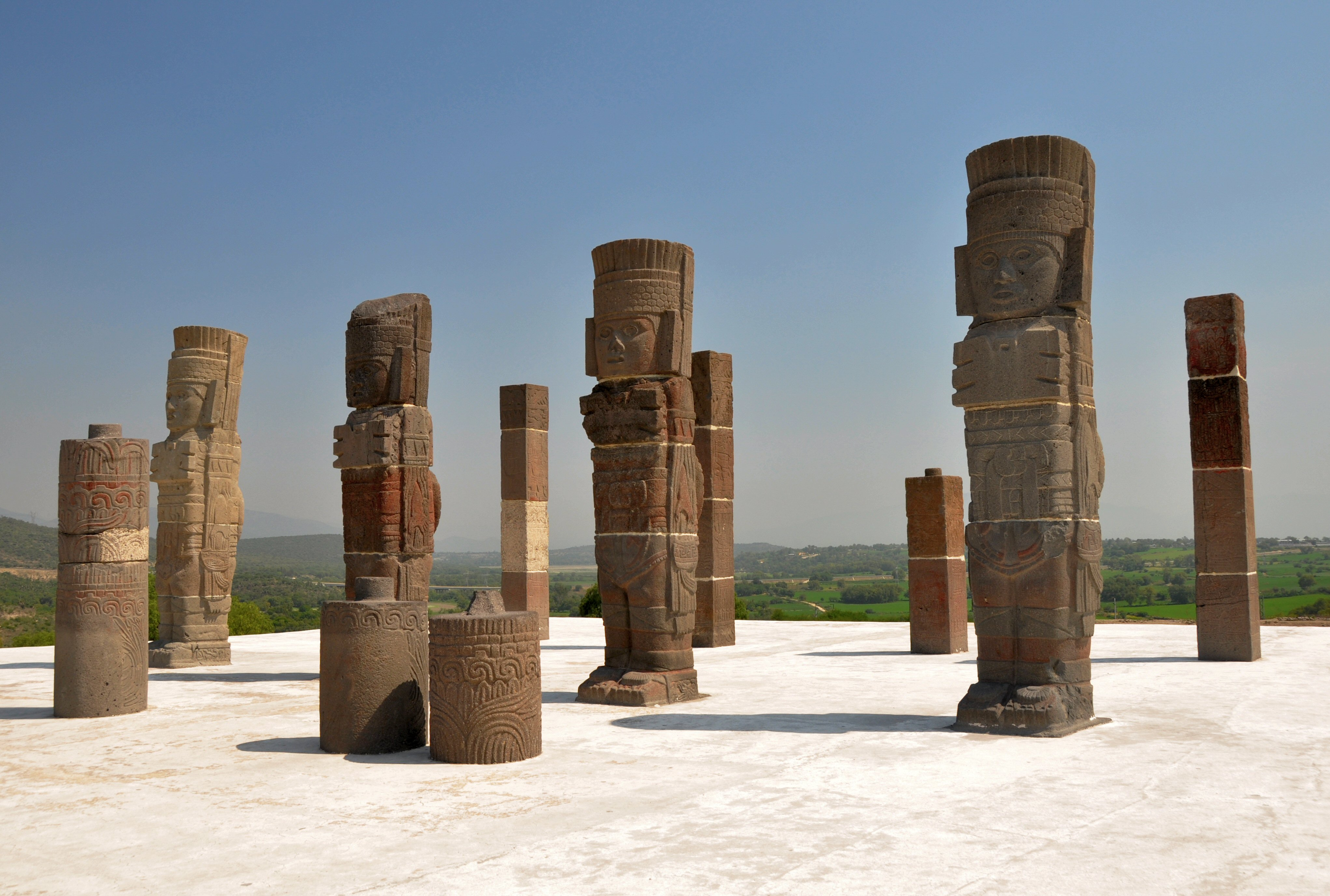
Tourism is an important sector of the municipal economy.

There are firms dedicated to manufacturing, mineral extraction and construction as well as "maquiladoras". The most important of these are the Francisco Pérez Ríos Thermoelectric plant and the PEMEX refinery as well as the Cruz Azul and Tolteca cement locations. The refinery was established in 1976, and makes gasoline, diesel and solvents. It has 35 plants in eleven sections, covering an area of 707 hectares (1,750 acres). It processes just under 25% of Mexico's crude employing about 3,500 workers. The main handcraft in the city is the making of replicas of Toltec stone pieces. The altas figures are also recreated in way, marble, plastic and clay. Textiles are also made especially quezquémetl, rebozos, sarapes, hats and baskets.

Commerce is mainly for local needs such as groceries and clothing. There are two main traditional markets in the city of Tula, the municipal market and the Tianguis. The latter generally concentrates on electronics. The major service sector is related to tourism. This is mostly focused on visitors to the Tula archeological site. There is also the Requena dam (boating, fishing and picnicking) and the Parque Acuático la Cantera, a water park with a pool and thermal springs. The municipality has two four star hotels and two three star hotels.

The municipality's infrastructure includes 37 km (23 mi) of federal highway, 72 km (45 mi) of state highway, 9 km (5.6 mi) of rural highway and 40 km (25 mi) of rail line. It has a main bus terminal with local and intercity bus service. Trains that regularly pass through include the Mexico City–Ciudad Juárez line and the Mexico City-Tula-Querétaro line. It still has telegraph service, one of the oldest still in service after 100 years. Postal service in the town is also one of Mexico's oldest, beginning in 1856. There are two radio stations, FM XHLLV and "Super Stereo 90.9".

== Demography ==
=== Populated places in Tula de Allende ===
Town	Population
Total	103,919
Tula de Allende	28,577
San Miguel Vindho	7,988
Bomintzha	3,568
Santa Ana Ahuehuepan	2,917
Santa María Macua	2,197
Xochitlán de las Flores	1,595
Michimaloya	1,242
Xitejé de Zapata	1,004

The census of 2010 reported a population of 103,919 people: 53,429 females and 50,490 males. The municipality has a total population of 103,919, living in 26,937 households, with 581 speaking an indigenous language.

The Tula de Allende municipality is very big, and includes many cities, towns, and small communities. The biggest city is Tula de Allende, and the second largest city is Cruz Azul City (near to San Miguel Vindho and Santa María Ilucan). Tula-Tepeji, the third Metropolitan Area in Hidalgo state, is the most important population center in the Mezquital valley.

== Culture and education ==
Eighty seven percent of the population is Catholic, with most of the rest practicing some form of Catholicism. The main feast day is dedicated to Saint Joseph on March 19. There is also a large annual pilgrimage from here to the Basilica of Guadalupe in Mexico City with many traveling by foot.

Traditional garb for men consists of pants and shirt made of undyed cotton cloth along with a sombrero. Women's traditional dress is a dress made of the some cloth often with a crinoline skirt underneath, decorated with ribbons and embroidery although beads and sequins are also used. A wool rebozo is common in the winter. For charreada events, men can be seen in charro outfits and women in China Poblana dress.

Traditional dishes of the area include barbacoa, carnitas, pulque, nopal cactus with eggs, beans with epazote and mixote but the area is known for dishes made with escamoles (ant eggs) as well as mezcal worms which are both seasonal. Street food such as gorditas is popular in the local markets. The most important museum in the municipality is the site museum for the Tula archeological site called the Jorge R. Acosta Museum, which is run by INAH.

The municipality has 73 preschools, 66 primary schools, 30 middle schools, thirteen high schools and at higher level the Universidad Politecnica de la Energia and the Universidad Tecnológica de Tula-Tepeji, with a total of about thirty thousand students. This is sufficient for the lower levels but not for higher education.

== Tula archeological site ==
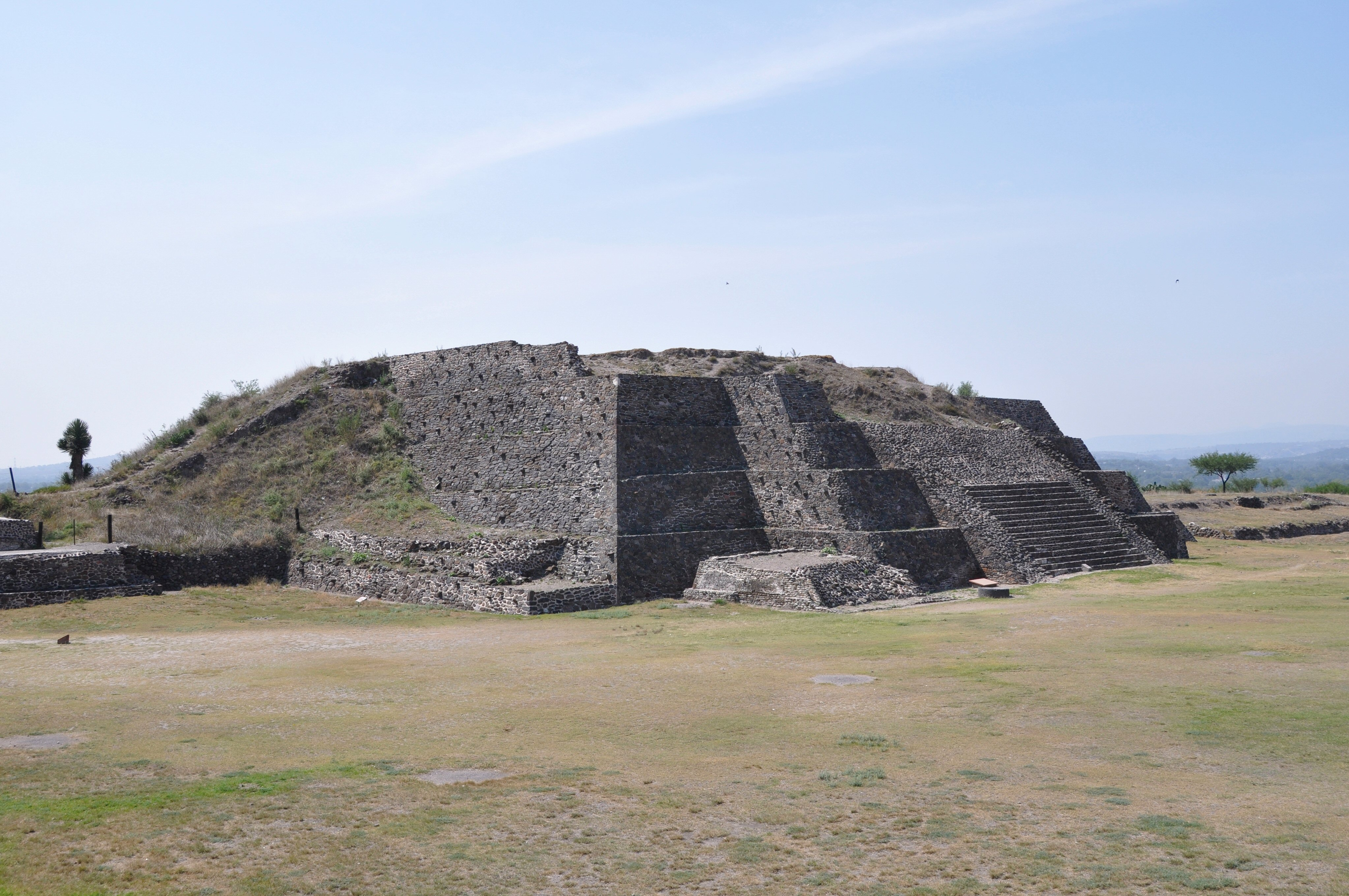
Pyramid at Tula archaeological site

The ceremonial center of ancient Tula is located about five minutes from the center of the modern city. Tula became the most important city in the region after the fall of Teotihuacan, although it never reached the same size due to competing cities in the area. Usually identified as the Toltec capital around 980 CE, the city was destroyed at some time between 1168 and 1179.

The site is at and around the junction of two rivers, the Río Rosas and the Río Tula. The two largest clusters of grand ceremonial architecture are nicknamed "Tula Grande" (the most visited by tourists) and "Tula Chico". Remains of other buildings extend for some distance in all directions. Tula Grande contains pyramids, Mesoamerican ball courts and other buildings but its most distinctive characteristics are the Atlantean figures, columns in the shape of warriors and the "Serpent Wall," a wall with reliefs that serve as a predecessor to similar constructions in later cultures.

The archeological site was made a national park in 1981 by the Mexican government. The park covers an area of 1 km^{2}.

== See also ==
- 2021 Tula River floods
