= José Antonio Rojo García =

Mexican politician (born 1966)

- Born: 14 February 1966 (age 60); Hidalgo, Mexico
- Occupation: Deputy
- Political party: PRI

José Antonio Rojo García de Alba (born 14 February 1966) is a Mexican politician affiliated with the Institutional Revolutionary Party (PRI). In 2012–2015 he served as a federal deputy during the 62nd Congress, representing Hidalgo's fifth district.
