= Javier Rojo Gómez =

Mexican politician and diplomat (1896–1970)

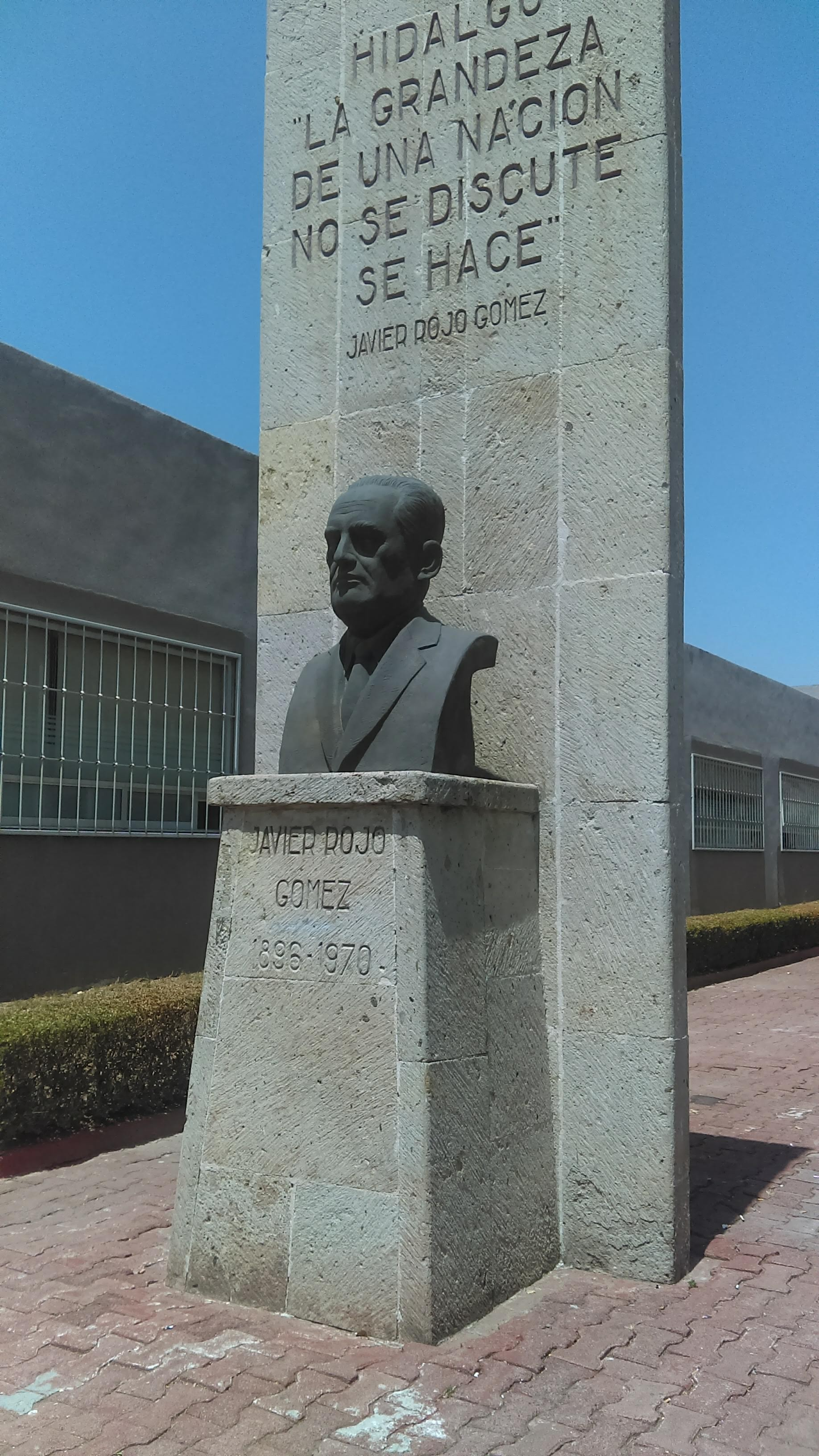
- Monument to Javier Rojo Gómez in Pachuca, Hidalgo

Governor of Quintana Roo
- In office 1967–1970

Head of the Federal District Department
- In office 1940–1946

Governor of Hidalgo
- In office 1937–1940

Federal deputy for Hidalgo's 2nd district
- In office 1926–1928

Personal details
- Born: 28 June 1896; Huichapan, Hidalgo, Mexico
- Died: 31 December 1970 (aged 74); Mexico City
- Political party: PRI
- Occupation: Politician

Javier Rojo Gómez (28 June 1896 – 31 December 1970) was a Mexican lawyer and politician affiliated with the Institutional Revolutionary Party (PRI). He held a number of prominent public positions, including governor of Hidalgo, head of the Federal District Department, and governor of Quintana Roo in the years before statehood.

== Political career ==
Javier Rojo Gómez was born in Bondojito, a community in the municipality of Huichapan, Hidalgo, in 1896. He studied for a law degree in Mexico City and graduated in 1921.

In 1926, after serving as a local deputy in the Congress of Hidalgo on two occasions, he was elected to the Chamber of Deputies for Hidalgo's 2nd district. He was elected as governor of Hidalgo in 1937. In 1940, President Manuel Ávila Camacho appointed him to his cabinet as head of the Federal District Department, a position in which he served for six years. He received substantial support as his party's potential candidate for the 1946 presidential election but lost out to Miguel Alemán Valdés.

Rojo Gómez withdrew from political life until his 1956 appointment as ambassador to Japan, where he remained for two years. Back in Mexico, he was appointed to head the Confederación Nacional Campesina (CNC) from 1962 to 1965. On 2 June 1967 he took office as the governor of Quintana Roo when it was still a federal territory. During his governorship, he played a leading role in the territory's development as a tourist destination, including the resort city of Cancún.

While still in office as the territory's governor, Javier Rojo Gómez died in Mexico City on 31 December 1970.

== Personal life ==
Rojo Gómez was married to Isabel Lugo, the sister of José Lugo Guerrero (governor of Hidalgo from 1941 to 1945). Their son, Jorge Rojo Lugo (1933–2010), also served as governor of Hidalgo (1975–76 and 1978–81) and as the federal secretary of agrarian reform (1976–1978). Another son, Javier, pursued a career in architecture.

== Legacy ==
Monuments to Rojo Gómez stand in Huichapan, Hidalgo; Pachuca, Hidalgo; and Chetumal, Quintana Roo.
