= Arely Gómez González =

Mexican attorney and politician

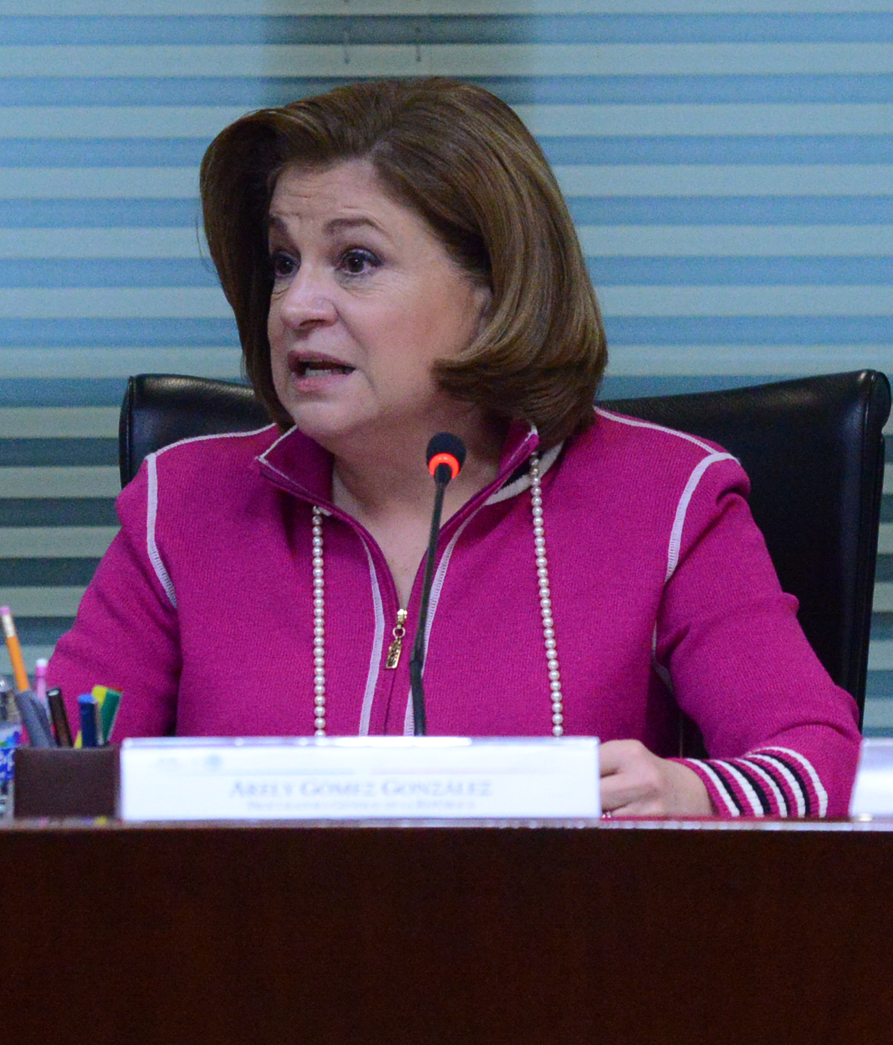

Secretary of the Civil Service
- In office 27 October 2016 – 30 November 2018
- President: Enrique Peña Nieto
- Preceded by: Virgilio Andrade Martínez

Attorney General of Mexico
- In office 27 February 2015 – 26 October 2016
- President: Enrique Peña Nieto
- Preceded by: Jesús Murillo Karam
- Succeeded by: Raúl Cervantes Andrade

Personal details
- Born: 9 November 1952 (age 73) Mexico City, Mexico
- Party: PRI
- Education: Anahuac University
- Occupation: Attorney

Arely Gómez González (born 9 November 1952) is a Mexican attorney and Institutional Revolutionary Party (PRI) politician. A lawyer by profession, Gómez González served as Mexico's Secretary of the Civil Service after 18 months as the country's Attorney General, both during the government of Enrique Peña Nieto. She was also elected to the Senate from the PRI's national list for the 62nd session of Congress (2012–2018).
