= Manuel Ángel Núñez Soto =

Mexican politician

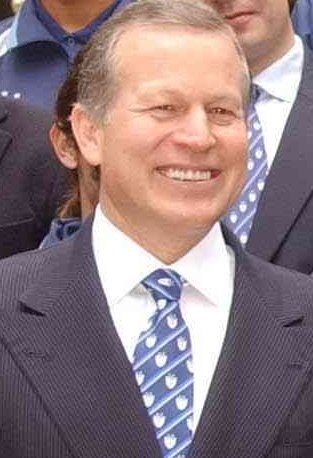
Manuel Ángel Núñez Soto

Manuel Ángel Núñez Soto (born January 30, 1951) is a Mexican politician affiliated with the Revolutionary Institutional Party (PRI). He is a former governor of Hidalgo.

Núñez Soto received a bachelor's degree in economics from the National Autonomous University of Mexico (UNAM) and specialized in public administration, commerce and finance at the Istituto per la Ricostruzione Industriale of Italy and at the École nationale d'administration in France.

In 1971 he started a career in the public sector by joining the Secretariat of Industry and Commerce (nowadays Secretariat of Economy). Later on he joined the Mexican Institute of Foreign Trade (in Spanish: Instituto Mexicano de Comercio Exterior) and the Secretariat of Finance and Public Credit (SHCP). Between 1991 and 1993, during the North American Free Trade Agreement negotiations, he also headed the Mexican delegation in Canada.

By mid-1993 Núñez Soto had moved to the state of Hidalgo to join the cabinet of governor Jesús Murillo Karam as secretary of industry and commerce. In 1995 he took over the state Secretariat of the Interior and two years later he was elected to the Chamber of Deputies representing Hidalgo's sixth district (the city of Pachuca and surrounding areas).

After two years in the Chamber Núñez Soto resigned to become the PRI candidate to the governorship of Hidalgo. He won the election in 1999 and served in the post until April 2005. During his administration the employment rate grew 18% and the agricultural production grew 52%.

During the early months of 2005 Núñez Soto sought the 2006 PRI presidential candidacy.
