= Tlaxcoapan =

- Town and municipality
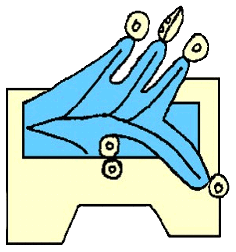
- Coat of arms

- Location within Hidalgo Location within Mexico
- Coordinates: 20°05′43″N 99°13′12″W
- Country: Mexico
- State: Hidalgo
- Municipality: Tlaxcoapan

Government
  - Federal electoral district: Hidalgo's 5th

Area
  - Town and municipality: 79.3 km^{2} (30.6 sq mi)

Population (2010 census)
  - Town and municipality: 26,758
  - Density: 337/km^{2} (874/sq mi)
  - Metro: Tula de Allende
- Time zone: UTC-6 (Zona Centro)
- Website: tlaxcoapan.hidalgo.gob.mx

Tlaxcoapan is a town and one of the 84 municipalities of Hidalgo, in central-eastern Mexico. The municipality covers an area of 79.3 km^{2}.

As of 2005, the municipality had a total population of 26,758. It is now part of Tula de Allende built-up (or metro) area.

== Toponymy ==
The word Tlanalapa comes from the Nahuatl Tachtli 'ball game', atl 'water' and pan 'on'; so its meaning is "On or in the river of the ball game". (Note: The etymological origin of the name of a municipality can have) Another meaning could be that it decomposes into Tlachco (from tlachtli 'ball game' and the locative -co 'en') 'in the ball game' or literally 'ball game court'; atl 'water', and the locative suffix -pan 'over'; so

== Demography ==
=== Populated places in Tlaxcoapan ===
Town	Population
Total	
Tlaxcoapan	
Doxei	
