= Conín =

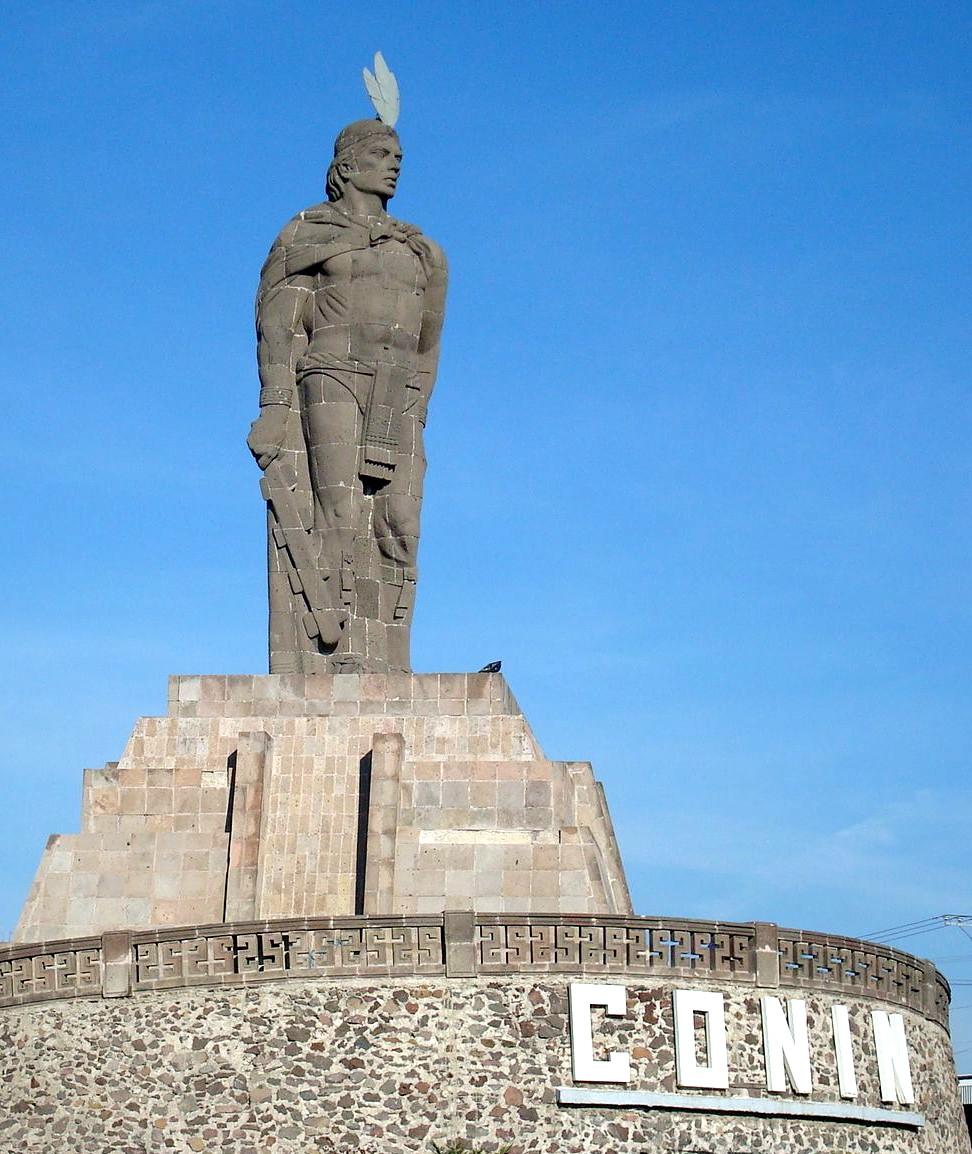
A statue honoring Conín located at the entrance to the city of Querétaro coming from de Mexico City–Querétaro highway

Conín (also known by his Christian name Hernando [Fernando] de Tapia) was a Native American conquistador of the Otomi people, who helped the Spaniards conquer territories in the central part of Mexico during the 16th century. In the Otomi language his name means "Thunder".

== Early life ==
Conín was born in Nopala in the Xilotepec province (modern state of Hidalgo), most likely in the late 15th century. Before the conquest he traded blankets, salt, hides, and other goods among the Chichimecas, Otomís, Tlaxcalans, and Mexica. After the conquest of Tenochtitlan by the Spanish in 1521, Conín left Xilotepec with his family and lived with the Chichimeca tribes in Andamaxei (Otomi for "Place of the Ball Game") in the Bajío (present day Querétaro).

== Conversion ==
Around 1528 or 1529 the conquistador Hernán Pérez de Bocanegra (along with a contingent of warriors from the newly conquered Tarascan Empire) arrived in the region seeking to make an alliance with Conín. Conín had seen the power of the Spanish first hand and worked with Bocanegra to bring the region under Spanish control peacefully. Accepting Spanish control also meant accepting Roman Catholicism and Conín was the first to be baptized, taking the Christian name Hernando (Fernando) de Tapia. He took the name Hernando from Hernán Pérez de Bocanera and Tapia from the conquistador Andrés de Tapia.

== Foundation of Querétaro ==
When Hernán Pérez de Bocanegra initially arrived at Andamaxei, his Tarascan allies called it Queréndaro which means "Place of Pines" in the Purépecha language. This became the origin for the name of the town that would be founded by Conín and Juan Sánchez de Alanís, a servant of Bocanegra who was fluent in the Otomí language. Between 1531 and 1540 the growth of the Spanish population in the settlement was slow. During the 1540s the real work of foundation began with the construction of irrigation ditches and an influx of Spanish, Otomí, Nahua, and other indigenous tribes attracted by the fertile land and relative peace.

== History ==
Cristobal de Olid entered the Bajío region in 1822. Although the arrival of Spaniards was generally met with resistance by the indigenous Chichimeca cultures, the Otomí people aligned themselves with the Spaniards and fought beside them to defeat the Aztecs living in the Querétaro region. As a demonstration of loyalty, the Otomi leader Conin converted to Roman Catholicism between the years 1522 and 1526 and changed his name to Fernando de Tapia. In 1531 the city of Santiago de Querétaro was planned by Juan Sánchez de Alaniz and Conin.

== Legends and Tradition ==
According to tradition, the conquest of Querétaro was accomplished without resorting to arms after seeing a vision of the Cross and Saint James the Great ("Santiago"), after whom the city was named.
