= Ramón Ramírez Valtierra =

Mexican politician (born 1964)

- Born: 25 February 1964 (age 62); Hidalgo, Mexico
- Education: UAEH
- Occupation: Politician
- Political party: PRI

Ramón Ramírez Valtierra (born 25 February 1964) is a Mexican politician from the Institutional Revolutionary Party (PRI). From 2009 to 2012 he served in the Chamber of Deputies during the 61st Congress, representing Hidalgo's fifth district. He took two leaves of absence during his term, during which he was replaced by his substitute, Marcela Vieyra Alamilla.

He earned his law degree from the Autonomous University of the State of Hidalgo (UAEH) in 1987.
