= Universidad Abierta y a Distancia de México =

Mexican university

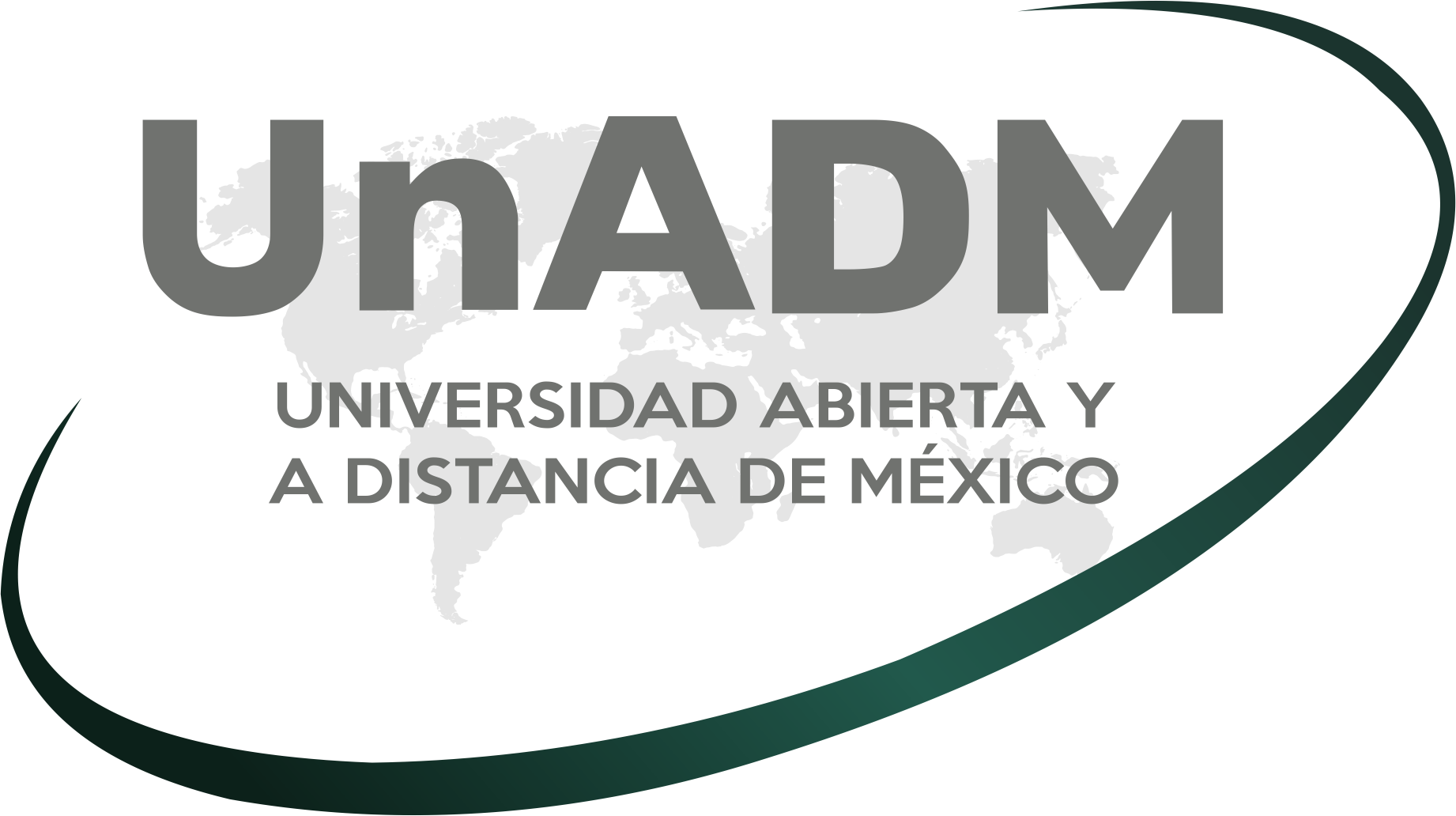
- Other name: UnADM
- Former name: ESAD
- Type: Public, distance learning
- Established: Jan - 2009
- Rector: Lilian Kravzov Appel
- Students: 89, 127
- Location: Puebla # 143, Piso E3, Col. Roma Norte, C.P. 06700 Delegación Cuauhtémoc, Distrito Federal, México
- Campus: urban
- Language: Spanish
- Website: www.unadmexico.mx

The Universidad Abierta y a Distancia de México, (UnADM), (Open and Distance University of Mexico), is a Mexican institution of higher education specialized in the open and distance modality, with public and free status, deconcentrated from the Secretariat of Public Education. This institution began operating in 2009 under the name of ESAD.

In 2008, the operating rules of the program Educación Superior a Distancia - ESAD (Distance Higher Education) were published in the Official Gazette of the Federation. and was decreed as a university on January 19, 2012 in the Official Journal of the Federation..

UnADM is the world's first non-profit, tuition-free, accredited, online, Americas university. Its headquarters are located in Distrito Federal, and its rector is directly elected by the President of the Republic. It is empowered to issue college certificates, undergraduate and graduate major degrees to those who have completed higher education in accordance with their plans and programs. The professional title is granted through the approval of a public dissertation, in which is exposed and defended an original project that was developed through professional stays at the end of the career.

All the courses are taught via the Internet, taking advantage of the technological tools of communication. The programs of the different majors are divided into semesters, each of which consists of two blocks, formed by three courses each. The modular curricular model allows obtaining a Técnico Superior Universitario title (Higher University Technician - similar to an associate degree), after having completed the first two years, and a Licenciatura title (bachelor degree), at the end of four years.

== Programs ==
Técnico Superior Universitario -associate's degree	Licenciatura e ingeniería - bachelor's degree	Posgrados - postgraduate
Community Development; Public Security; Tourist Enterprises Administration; SMEs Management and Administration; International Marketing; Biotechnology; Renewable energy; Environmental technology; Mathematics; Telematics; Software Development; Logistics and Transportation; Medical Emergency; Community Promoter; Social Projects; Health Promotion; Management in Food and Nutrition; Health Services Management; Industrial Management	Community Development; Public Security; Tourist Enterprises Administration; SMEs Management and Administration; Accounting and Public Finance; International Marketing; Biotechnology; Renewable energy; Environmental technology; Mathematics; Telematics; Software Development; Logistics and Transportation; Medical Emergency; Community Promoter; Social Projects; Health Promotion; Management in Food and Nutrition; Health Services Management; Territorial Management; Policies and Social Projects; Education for Health; Applied Nutrition; Health Services Management; Mathematics Teaching; Law; Public Administration and Management; Food Security; Industrial Management	Specialty Degree in History of Mexico Teaching; Master's Degree in History of Mexico Teaching; Master's Degree in Food Security
