= List of governors of Hidalgo =

Governor of Hidalgo
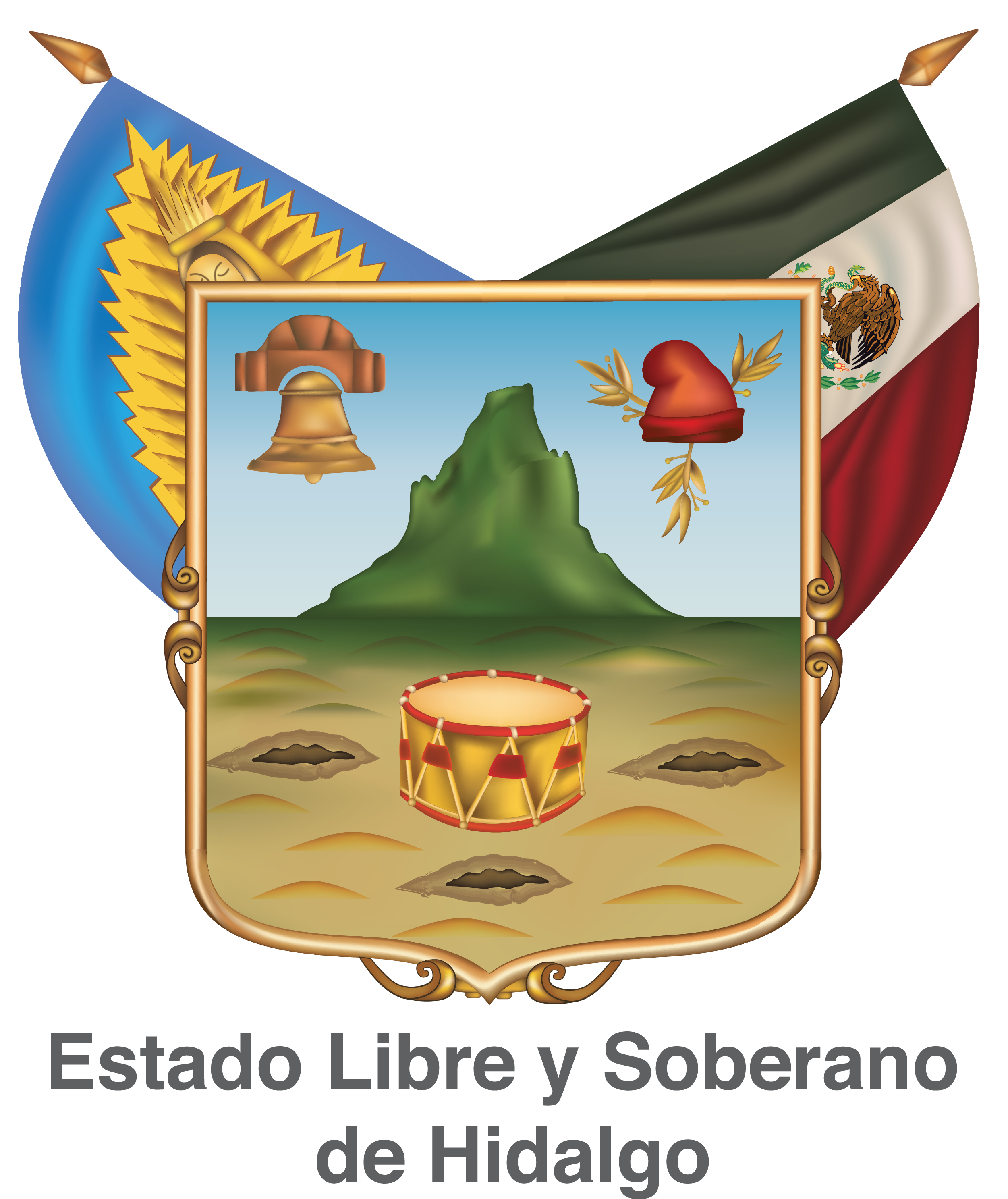

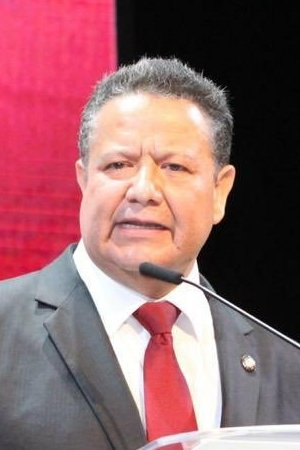
- Incumbent; Julio Menchaca since September 5, 2022
- Term length: 6 years, not eligible for re-election
- Inaugural holder: Juan C. Doria
- Formation: June 7, 1848
- Website: www.hidalgo.gob.mx

The governor of Hidalgo is the head of the executive branch of government of the Mexican state of Hidalgo.

From the establishment of the office, 78 individuals have served as Hidalgo's governor including those who served on a provisional or interim basis. The following list is a list of all individuals who have served as Hidalgo's governor.

== Governors of Hidalgo ==
- (1869): Juan Crisóstomo Doria (provisional governor)
- (1869–1873): Antonio Tagle
- (1873–1876): Justino Fernández Mondoño
- (1877–1881): Rafael Cravioto
- (1881–1885): Simón Cravioto
- (1885–1889): Francisco Cravioto
- (1889–1893): Rafael Cravioto
- (1893–1897): Rafael Cravioto
- (1897–1901): Francisco Valenzuela (deputy)
- (1901–1905): Pedro L. Rodríguez
- (1905–1909): Pedro L. Rodríguez
- (1909–1911): Pedro L. Rodríguez
- (1911): Joaquín González (interim governor)
- (1911): Emilio Asiain (interim governor)
- (1911): Jesús Silva Espinosa (interim governor)
- (1911–1912): Ramón M. Rosales Rodríguez (interim governor)
- (1912): Amador Castañeda Jaimes (interim governor)
- (1912–1913): Miguel Lara (interim governor)
- (1913): Agustín Sanguines (interim governor)
- (1913–1914): Agustín Pérez (provisional governor)
- (1914): Agustín Sanguines (interim governor)
- (1914): Froilán Jiménez (interim governor)
- (1914): Nicolás Flores Rubio (provisional governor)
- (1914): Filiberto Rubio (Deputy governor)
- (1914): Manuel Medina Veytia (provisional governor)
- (1914): Almaquio Tovar (provisional governor)
- (1914–1915): Daniel Cerecedo Estrada (provisional governor)
- (1915): Vicente Salazar (provisional governor)
- (1915): Roberto Martínez y Martínez (provisional governor)
- (1915): Fortunato Maycotte (provisional governor)
- (1915): Alfredo J. Machuca (provisional governor)
- (1915): José L. Aguilar (provisional governor)
- (1915): Fernando Lizardi (provisional governor)
- (1915): Miguel Gómez Noriega (provisional governor)
- (1915): José Kotuscey (provisional governor)
- (1915): J. de la Luz Romero (provisional governor)
- (1915–1917): Nicolás Flores (provisional governor)
- (1917): Alfredo Rodríguez (provisional governor)
- (1917–1921): Nicolás Flores Rubio
- (1921–1923): Amado Azuara
- (1923–1925): Antonio Azuara
- (1925–1929): Matías Rodríguez
- (1929–1933): Bartolomé Vargas Lugo
- (1933–1937): Ernesto Viveros
- (1937–1940): Javier Rojo Gómez
- (1940–1941): Otilio Villegas Lora
- (1941–1945): José Lugo Guerrero
- (1945–1951): Vicente Aguirre del Castillo
- (1951–1957): Quintín Rueda Villagrán
- (1957–1961): Alfonso Corona del Rosal
- (1961–1963): Oswaldo Cravioto Cisneros
- (1963–1969): Carlos Ramírez Guerrero
- (1969–1970): Manuel Sánchez Vite
- (1970–1972): Donaciano Serna Leal
- (1972–1975): Manuel Sánchez Vite
- (1975): Otoniel Miranda
- (1975): Raúl Lozano Ramírez
- (1975–1976): Jorge Rojo Lugo
- (1976–1978): José Luis Suárez Molina
- (1978–1981): Jorge Rojo Lugo
- (1981–1987): Guillermo Rossell de la Lama
- (1987–1993): Adolfo Lugo Verduzco
- (1993–1998): Jesús Murillo Karam
- (1998–1999): Humberto Lugo Gil
- (1999–2005): Manuel Ángel Núñez Soto
- (2005–2011): Miguel Ángel Osorio Chong
- (2011–2016): Francisco Olvera Ruiz
- (2016–2022): Omar Fayad.
- (2022–present): Julio Menchaca
