= Chapantongo =

- Town and municipality
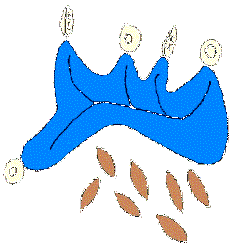
- Coat of arms

- Location within Hidalgo Location within Mexico
- Coordinates: 20°17′N 99°24′W
- Country: Mexico
- State: Hidalgo
- Municipality: Chapantongo

Government
  - Federal electoral district: Hidalgo's 5th

Area
  - Total: 298.1 km^{2} (115.1 sq mi)

Population (2020)
  - Total: 12,967
- Time zone: UTC-6 (Zona Centro)
- Website: chapantongo.gob.mx

Chapantongo is a town and one of the 84 municipalities of Hidalgo, in central-eastern Mexico.

The municipality covers an area of 298.1 km^{2} (115.1 sq mi). In the 2020 INEGI census, the municipality reported a total population of 12,967.
