= Universidad Tecnológica de Tula-Tepeji =

Coordinates: 20.0130°N 99.3465°W

Technological University of Tula-Tepeji
- Logo of Technological University of Tula-Tepeji
- Motto: De la Cultura y la Ciencia, Crearemos el Futuro (Spanish)
- Motto in English: Developing future through science and culture
- Type: Public
- Established: 1991
- Rector: Dra. Irasema Linares Medina
- Academic secretary: Mtra. Margarita Núñez Zamudio
- Students: 2140
- Location: Tula de Allende, Hidalgo, Mexico
- Campus: Rural, 40 acres (16.2 ha)
- Mascot: Petirrojos
- Website: UTTT.edu.mx

The Technological University of Tula-Tepeji (UTTT) is a public university located in Tula de Allende, Hidalgo, Mexico. UTTT has three academic units offering 31 academic programs, with an emphasis on scientific, engineering, and technological education.

UTTT cultivates universal values, sustainability, entrepreneurship, social accountability, community development, cultural activities and sports, all through the Student Fortifying Institutional Program (PIFE).

Founded in 1991, in response to the need for competent technicians, UTTT is a national university that started by promoting a new degree, TSU Técnico Superior Universitario. The university is managed by the government of Mexico, through the Secretary of Public Education Secretaria de Educacion Publica (SEP).

== History ==
The Technological University of Tula-Tepeji was established in January 1991, commencing academic activities in October of the same year. It has academic units in Chapulhuacán and Tepetitlan.

UTTT is one of the first institutions in the state to provide an in-depth education. It is Hidalgo's largest university with 3,870 students on its three campuses, each specializing in promoting regional development.

== Campus ==
The university has four science and technology laboratories: chemistry, mechanics, electrical machines, and manufacturing processes. The seven faculty buildings are mechatronics (MC), industrial maintenance (MI), industrial processes (POI), accountancy (CO), business development (DE), information and communication technologies (TICs), and environmental technology (TA).

Seven academic buildings provide for students: entailment (VI), library (B), languages center, villas/general services, IT laboratory, rectory (R), and cafeteria.

It has three parking lots, two of which are unpaved. Recreational open areas include one volleyball court, two basketball courts, one soccer field, one fast-phased soccer field, and an athletic track.

== University rankings ==
The University has multiple international rankings: Mundial 15617, Continental 1255, Country 242, Presence 13381, Impact 15704, Aperture 8612 and Excellence 5080.

== Programs ==
The University operates under a traditional lecture system, complemented by programs to ease student integration into the workforce. This process enables students to continue their studies, for example, with professional certification, a TSU degree, technical engineering coursework, or any advanced study within the engineering department. Deciding whether to continue studies occurs during the third, sixth, ninth, or eleventh terms. All classes are supposed to be 70% practice and 30% theory.

Alumni have the necessary professional and generic competences, whether it is local, regional, or national in its scope.

The institution offers an academic model that allows the student to obtain an engineering degree in eleven four-month periods known as trimesters. If students successfully complete the first six trimesters, they get their TSU degree. The education is intensive and responds to the production sector's needs. Students do an internship during the sixth and eleventh trimesters.

=== Undergraduate program ===
The full-time undergraduate program lasts three years and eight months and offers professional majors in accounting, science and engineering degrees. There are six enrollments of new students each year. The process consists of ticket query, admittance exam and payment of tuition.
