= Adolfo Lugo Verduzco =

Mexican politician (1933–2022)

Governor of Hidalgo
- In office 1 April 1987 – 31 March 1993
- Preceded by: Guillermo Rossell de la Lama
- Succeeded by: Jesús Murillo Karam

Senator for Hidalgo
- In office 1 September 1982 – 1987

President of the Institutional Revolutionary Party
- In office 2 December 1982 – 9 October 1986
- Preceded by: Pedro Ojeda Paullada
- Succeeded by: Jorge de la Vega Domínguez

Personal details
- Born: 24 March 1933 Huichapan, Hidalgo, Mexico
- Died: 21 January 2022 (aged 88)
- Party: PRI
- Education: UNAM

Adolfo Lugo Verduzco (24 March 1933 – 21 January 2022) was a Mexican politician affiliated with the Institutional Revolutionary Party (PRI). He was a senator, president of the PRI and governor of Hidalgo.

== Biography ==
Lugo Verduzco was the son of Adolfo Lugo Guerrero and Magdalena Verduzco Andrade. He received a bachelor's degree in law from the National Autonomous University of Mexico (UNAM), a master's degree in public administration from the Institute of Social Studies at The Hague (Netherlands) and took a specialization in public administration at the École nationale d'administration, (France).

He joined the Institutional Revolutionary Party (PRI) in 1952 and served as its president from 1982 until 1986. He also served in the Senate from 1982 until 1988 and as governor of Hidalgo from 1987 to 1993. Lugo Verduzco died on 21 January 2022, at the age of 88.

== Sources ==
- Diccionario biográfico del gobierno mexicano, Ed. Fondo de Cultura Económica, Mexico, 1992.
