= Julio Menchaca =

Mexican politician (born 1959)

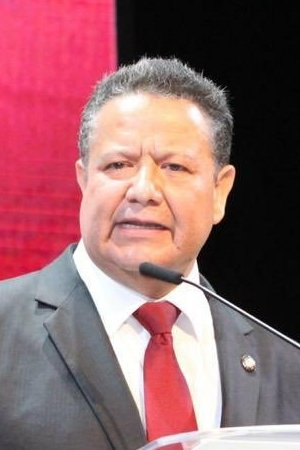

Governor of Hidalgo
- Incumbent
- Assumed office 5 September 2022
- Preceded by: Omar Fayad

Personal details
- Born: Julio Ramón Menchaca Salazar; 27 December 1959 (age 66) Pachuca, Hidalgo
- Party: National Regeneration Movement (2017–present); Institutional Revolutionary Party (1980–2015)
- Spouse: Edda Vite
- Children: 2
- Education: UAEH
- Occupation: Politician

Julio Ramón Menchaca Salazar (born 27 December 1959) is a Mexican politician currently serving as Governor of Hidalgo. Previously affiliated with the Institutional Revolutionary Party (PRI), he aligned himself with the National Regeneration Movement (Morena) in 2017. He previously served as a deputy in the Congress of Hidalgo and as a senator for Hidalgo in 2018–2022.
