= Jesús Murillo Karam =

Mexican lawyer and politician

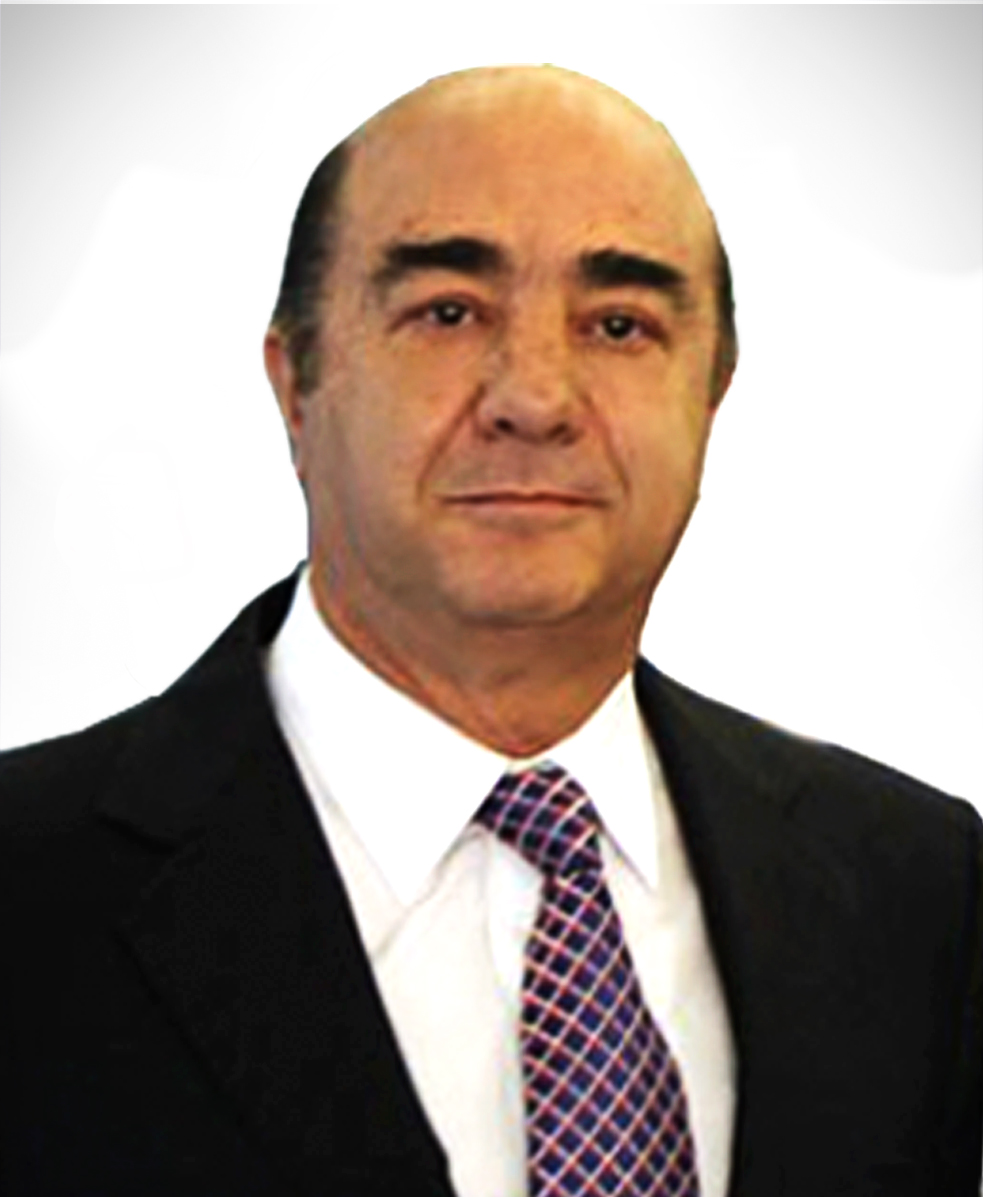

Attorney General of Mexico
- In office 4 December 2012 – 27 February 2015
- President: Enrique Peña Nieto
- Preceded by: Marisela Morales Ibáñez
- Succeeded by: Arely Gómez González

President of the Chamber of Deputies
- In office 1 September 2012 – 4 December 2012
- Preceded by: Óscar Martín Arce Paniagua
- Succeeded by: Francisco Arroyo Vieyra

Governor of Hidalgo
- In office 1 April 1993 – 28 October 1998
- Preceded by: Adolfo Lugo Verduzco
- Succeeded by: Humberto Lugo Gil

Personal details
- Born: 2 March 1948 (age 78) Real del Monte, Hidalgo
- Party: Institutional Revolutionary Party (PRI)
- Education: Autonomous University of Hidalgo

Jesús Murillo Karam (born 2 March 1947) is a Mexican lawyer and politician affiliated with the Institutional Revolutionary Party (PRI). He notably served as Attorney General of Mexico from 2012 to 2015 under Enrique Peña Nieto. He served in this role at the time of the 2014 Iguala kidnapping, and was later arrested in 2022 over charges concerning torture and forced disappearances. In 2024, he was ultimately released from prison, and was placed under house arrest.

== Life and career ==
Born in Real del Monte, Hidalgo, he is of Lebanese descent. Murillo Karam was elected to the Chamber of Deputies in the 1979 mid-terms (for Hidalgo's 4th district) and again in the 1985 general election (for Hidalgo's 6th district), and to the Senate in 1991. He served as governor of Hidalgo from 1993 to 1998. In 1998 he became Undersecretary of Public Security and then joined the campaign of Francisco Labastida in the 2000 presidential election.

In the 2006 general election he was re-elected as a senator for his state, and in February 2007, he was elected general secretary of his party with Beatriz Paredes as president. He was president of the Commission of Interior in the Senate. In September 2012, he was elected to the 62nd Congress as a plurinominal deputy, during which he served as the president of the Chamber of Deputies. He later passed his seat to his alternate to become attorney general.

He became Attorney General of Mexico (PGR) on 4 December 2012. In 2015, he was accused of bribery in a U.S. federal lawsuit filed in San Antonio, Texas, and would deny allegations. He resigned on 27 February 2015 to head the Secretariat of Agrarian, Land, and Urban Development.

=== Arrest and imprisonment ===
In August 2022 Murillo Karam was arrested over multiple charges (torture, forced disappearances, and offences against the administration of justice) related to the 2014 Iguala mass kidnapping during his tenure as attorney general. The case against Murillo Karam was later suspended by a judge who "openly admonished the new prosecutors for shoddy work". On 13 April 2024 he was released from incarceration and placed under house arrest at his home in Mexico City. He remains under house arrest as of 2026.

Political offices
Preceded by Gerardo Sosa Castelán	Senator in the LX Legislature of the Mexican Congress; 2006–2009*	Succeeded by Roberto Pedraza Martínez (interim)
Preceded by Adolfo Lugo Verduzco	Governor of Hidalgo; 1993–1998	Succeeded by Humberto Lugo Gil

* Requested a leave of absence to leave his post to serve as general secretary of his party.
