= Nopala =

Nopala de Villagrán
- Town and municipality
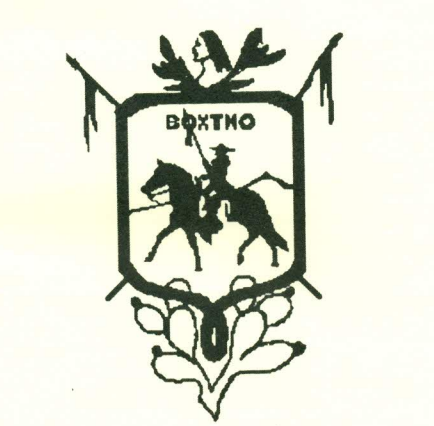
- Coat of arms

- Location in Mexico Nopala de Villagrán (Mexico)
- Coordinates: 20°15′10″N 99°38′36″W
- Country: Mexico
- State: Hidalgo
- Municipality: Nopala de Villagrán

Government
  - Federal electoral district: Hidalgo's 5th

Area
  - Total: 334 km^{2} (129 sq mi)

Population (2005)
  - Total: 15,099
- Time zone: UTC-6 (Zona Centro)
- Website: nopaladevillagran.gob.mx

Nopala (officially: Nopala de Villagrán; Otomi: ʼMostʼä) is a town and one of the 84 municipalities of Hidalgo, in central-eastern Mexico. The municipality covers an area of 334 km^{2}.

As of 2005, the municipality had a total population of 15,099.
