= Tepetitlán =

- Town and municipality
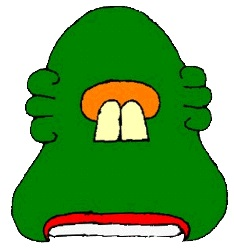
- Coat of arms

- Location within Hidalgo Location within Mexico
- Coordinates: 20°11′03″N 99°22′51″W
- Country: Mexico
- State: Hidalgo
- Municipality: Tepetitlán

Government
  - Federal electoral district: Hidalgo's 5th

Area
  - Total: 180 km^{2} (69 sq mi)

Population (2005)
  - Total: 8,893
- Time zone: UTC-6 (Zona Centro)
- Website: tepetitlan.gob.mx

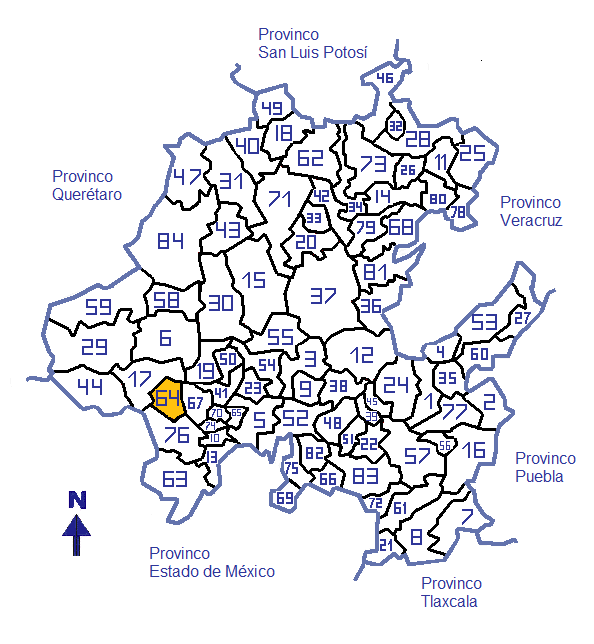
Location of Tepetitlán in Hidalgo

Tepetitlán is a town and one of the 84 municipalities of Hidalgo, in central-eastern Mexico. The municipality covers an area of 180 km^{2} (69 sq mi).

As of 2005, the municipality had a total population of 8,893.
