= Huichapan =

- Municipality and town
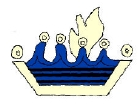
- Coat of arms

- Location within Hidalgo Location within Mexico
- Coordinates: 20°22′24″N 99°38′56″W
- Country: Mexico
- State: Hidalgo
- Municipal seat: Huichapan

Area
  - Total: 668.1 km^{2} (258.0 sq mi)

Population (2020)
  - Total: 47,425
- Time zone: UTC-6 (Central)
- Postal code: 42400
- Area code: 761
- Website: huichapan.gob.mx

Huichapan (Spanish pronunciation: [wiˈtʃapan]; Otomi: Nxamädo) is a town and one of the 84 municipalities of Hidalgo, in central-eastern Mexico. The municipality covers an area of 668.1 km^{2}. Its name derives from the Classical Nahuatl Huēyichiyapan.

In 2020, the municipality reported a total population of 47,425, up from 39,734 in 2005. In 2017 there were 425 inhabitants who spoke an indigenous language, primarily Otomí del Valle del Mezquital.

== Notable people ==
- Pedro María de Anaya, president of Mexico from April 2 to May 20 1847 and then again from November 13 to January 8 1848
