= Fuerza Unida =

Workers' activist group in San Antonio, Texas, USA

Fuerza Unida is a workers' activist group based in San Antonio, Texas, which led a lengthy series of protests against Levi Strauss & Co. over the company's closing of production plants in the United States. They have also been active in environmental activism and protests against the North American Free Trade Agreement (NAFTA).

== Founding ==
Fuerza Unida was founded in 1990 by former employees of Levi Strauss & Co., protesting the sudden closure of the company's San Antonio plant and shifting of labor overseas to Costa Rica. This resulted in loss of employment by 1,250 Mexican and Mexican-American women. Many of these women began meeting in a local church to commiserate and comfort one another, eventually deciding to organize themselves into a formal group. Workers affected by the layoff, including Viola Casares and Petra Mata, who would later become co-coordinators of the group, began coordinating protests against Levi's as Fuerza Unida.

== Campaign Against Levi Strauss & Co. ==
The former employees demanded compensation from Levi's, as they had been given no severance pay or other support after losing their jobs, and pressured Levi's to meet these demands through boycotts and hunger strikes. Early support in these efforts came from other activist groups such as League of United Latin American Citizens (LULAC) and the Southwest Workers Union. Before the layoffs occurred, employees of the plant had been approached about unionization by the Amalgamated Clothing and Textile Workers Union, but at that time did not believe that forming a union would be beneficial to them. After the layoffs, members of Fuerza Unida approached ACTWU for support but were denied. Support for a boycott was also sought from and denied by the International Ladies Garment Workers Union (ILGWU). This caused the group to look for sources of support outside of organized labor.

Members of the group filed a class action lawsuit against Levi Strauss & Co. in 1993, claiming that the closure of the plant was a form of discrimination against some employees who had filed workers' compensation claims. The lawsuit was dismissed; an appeal was also defeated. United States District Judge H.F. Garcia dismissed the case 'with prejudice', meaning that it could not be refiled, and charged the attorney representing Fuerza Unida $5000 for "filing a frivolous claim".

At one point a satellite office for the group was planned in San Francisco, near the Levi's company headquarters.

For several years running after the initial layoff, Fuerza Unida coordinated hunger strikes against Levi's during the Thanksgiving holiday. A "Fast for Justice" hunger strike by the group's members in October 1997 was supported by 15 simultaneous hunger strikes in other locations in the US and Mexico. Protests and boycotts led by Fuerza Unida continued in the years following the 1990 San Antonio layoffs, as further outsourcing led to layoffs of workers in other parts of the United States. This included the 1997 closing of 11 plants that left approximately 6,400 workers unemployed. Severance packages were negotiated for laid-off workers in subsequent closures; Fuerza Unida's requests that the 1990 San Antonio layoff employees be awarded with a similar package have not been fulfilled. A Levi's representative confirmed that the reaction of workers involved in the 1990 San Antonio layoff was a factor in determining the company's severance package offerings in later layoffs.

== Other Activism and Recognition ==
Fuerza Unida is active globally in matters of workers' rights and environmental justice. Members have referred to themselves as "early victims of NAFTA" and have explicitly stated their opposition to NAFTA as a motive in their activity. In 1993 they were one of 17 Latino organizations to sign a letter urging President Clinton to renegotiate the agreement. Fuerza Unida turned to environmental justice groups for the support they did not find from organized labor, and have mutually supportive relationships with environmental groups such as the Southwest Network for Environment and Economic Justice.

Fuerza Unida also formed a sewing cooperative called El Hilo de la Justicia ("The Thread of Justice") to provide employment and material support for those in San Antonio affected by layoffs. The cooperative provides many services to women undergoing job loss, including providing food, education, and legal help. The group has also developed programming for community support targeting those not involved in the garment industry, including youth programs.

In 2009, founding member and co-coordinator Viola Casares was presented with the Ohtli Award for her efforts with both Fuerza Unida and LULAC.

In 2012, the group received a Conference Justice Grant, awarded by the Opportunity Finance Network and funded by attendees of its conference, recognizing the work of Fuerza Unida that "mirrors the OFN mission of aligning capital with social, economic and political justice."

Fuerza Unida also works with the non-partisan VoteRiders organization to spread state-specific information on voter ID requirements.
