= Project South =

Project South may refer to:

- Project South (organization), a non-profit organization in Atlanta, Georgia
- Proyecto Sur ('Project South'), a political party in Argentina
- Project South (Italy)
