= Dionicio =

Dionicio is a given name. Notable people with the given name include:

- Dionicio Cerón (born 1965), Mexican marathon runner
- Dionicio Escalante (born 1990), Mexican footballer
- Dionicio Gustavo (born 1983), Dominican karateka
- Dionicio Morales (1918-2008), American Latino civil rights leader
- Dionicio Rodriguez (1891–1955), Mexican-born, US-based artist and architect
