= Viola Casares =

American activist (born 1944)

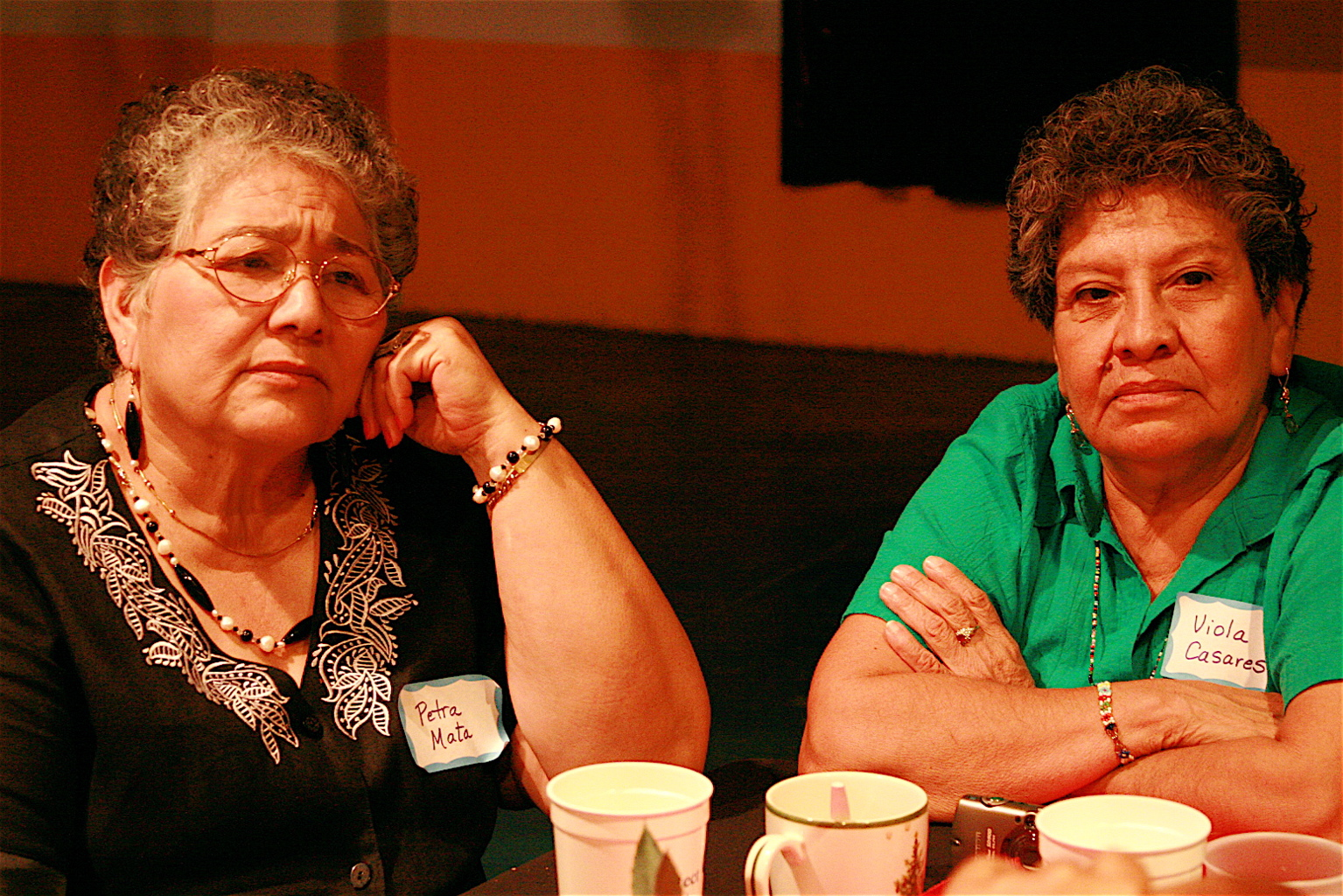
- Petra Mata and Viola Casares
- Born: 1944 (age 80–81); Bexar County
- Known for: Activism with Fuerza Unida
- Movement: Fuerza Unida
- Awards: Ohtli Award
- Website: http://www.fuerzaunida.org/

Viola Casares (born 1944) was the founder of a group called Fuerza Unida, an activist group in San Antonio, Texas.

== Life and Activism ==
In the 1990s, Viola Casares and 1,250 Mexican and Mexican-American women workers at Levi Strauss & Company were laid off overnight. Together, Viola Casares and Petra Marta, also laid off from Levi, started Fuerza Unida and co-directed the grassroots co-operative. The group coordinated protests against Levi Strauss & Company for the lack of corporate responsibility to workers. In the late 1990s, Levi did a second round of lay off and this time offered workers a severance package of roughly $30,000 per worker. Casares representing Fuerza Unida asked the company to negotiate a similar package for the 1990s former employees. She received the Ohtli Award for her work in community activism from the government of Mexico at the National Convention of League of United Latin American Citizens (LULAC) in San Juan Puerto Rico on July 17, 2009.
