= Escándalo TV =

Spanish talk show (2002–2011)

Escándalo TV was a daily live Spanish-language talk show about celebrity news and gossip of interest to a Latino audience, shown on TeleFutura (now known as UniMás). It was hosted by Charytín Goyco, Marissa del Portillo and Felipe Viel. Occasionally celebrities guest hosts were featured. Former hosts include Gabriela Teissier & Lilia Luciano.

Escándalo TV premiered on Telefutura on January 15, 2002 with Goyco, Viel, Del Portillo & Teissier as hosts. It was broadcast internationally. There was a weekend edition of the program called "Escándalo TV Extra", hosted by Viel, Elizabeth Lopez & Danella Urbay, who was a dancer. The final episode of Escándalo TV aired on October 7, 2011.
