= Marylou Olivarez Mason =

American civil servant

Marylou Olivarez Mason (née Hernandez, July 8, 1936 – May 18, 2019) was an American civil servant.

== Biography ==
Marylou Hernandez was born in San Antonio, Texas, and came to Michigan with her family as a seasonal farmworker. The family settled in Saginaw. Mason was educated at St. Joseph High School. She married and the couple had five children. They later divorced and she became a single mother. She worked in a doctor's office, starting as a receptionist and eventually becoming the office manager. She studied at the Saginaw School of Nursing part-time, graduating in 1969. She next worked at various nursing jobs until 1977, when she was hired by the Michigan Department of Civil Rights. In 1986 she became the first woman executive director of the Michigan Hispanic Latino Commission. Initiatives by Mason included Michigan Hispanic Heritage Month, the Hispanic Student Summit and Legislative Advocacy Day in Lansing. She retired at the end of 2015.

Olivarez married George E. Mason, a former assistant attorney general.

Marylou Mason was the first Hispanic woman to serve on the board of directors for Lansing Community College. She received the Diana L. Gorham Lifetime Achievement Award from the Lansing YWCA, the Cesar Chavez Community Service Award, the Ordinary Women Doing Extraordinary Things Award from the National Women's History Project's Michigan chapter and the Regional Mujer Award from the National Hispana Leadership Institute. In 2000, she was named Hispanic Woman of the Year. She received the Ohtli Award from the Mexican government in 2005. In 2014, she was named to the Michigan Women's Hall of Fame. In March 2015, she was featured in the book Great Girls in Michigan History by Patricia Majher.

In April 2017, Michigan Attorney General Bill Schuette charged Mason with embezzling money intended for a Cesar Chavez statue. A Michigan State Police investigation showed that Mason embezzled more than $73,500 between February 2013 and June 2015, the state Attorney General's Office has said. Mason pleaded guilty in December 2018.

Mason died on May 18, 2019, at the age of 82.
