= Project South (organization) =

Project South The Institution For The Elimination Poverty & Genocide
- Formation: Tax-exempt since December 1994; 31 years ago
- Type: 501(c)(3)
- Tax ID no.: EIN: 581956686
- Headquarters: Atlanta
- Revenue: 10,028,511 USD (2023)
- Expenses: 6,126,006 USD (2023)
- Website: projectsouth.org

Project South: Institute for the Elimination of Poverty and Genocide (or Project South) is a non-profit organization based in Atlanta, Georgia that incorporates sociological research into education and organizing projects. Project South focuses on developing activist strategies in response to social issues in the Southern region of the United States. The organization was founded in 1986 by Jerome Scott and Walda Katz-Fishman.

== Mission ==
According to Project South,

Project South is a Southern-based leadership development organization that creates spaces for movement building. We work with communities pushed forward by the struggle–to strengthen leadership and to provide popular political and economic education for personal and social transformation. We build relationships with organizations and networks across the US and global South to inform our local work and to engage in bottom-up movement building for social and economic justice.

Project South focuses on a four-pronged strategy to engage targeted communities: popular education, leadership development, partnerships and alliances, and organizing.

== Projects and Partnerships ==
Project South's activities consist of education and research, local organizing, regional organizing, and national projects, many of which are collaborations with other activist organizations.

=== Education and Research ===
Project South has created several initiatives focused on educating people on how to organize and form activist movements, and researching the current social climate in the United States.

==== BAM! Building a Movement ====
Project South holds monthly BAM retreats in Atlanta to train and educate community members who wish to get involved with and learn about the organization and general movement building. In addition to the monthly retreats, Project South holds BAM Institutes, year-long programs consisting of multiple sessions designed around a curriculum meant to facilitate a more in depth knowledge of education and movement building strategies.

==== University Sin Fronteras ====
The University Sin Fronteras was formed in 2010 as a collaboration between Project South and the Southwest Workers Union. According to Project South, the University Sin Fronteras is "a public and accessible space for education that advances systemic social change." The organization works to educate and connect youth interested in social activism with more experienced community organizers.

==== Publications ====
Project South publishes a bi-annual newsletter called "As the South Goes." The newsletter provides analysis of current social issues, community-based reports local movements, and updates on the Project South's organizing activities.

=== Local Organizing ===
Project South has created several initiatives focused on organizing local youth in the Atlanta area such as the Septima Clark Community Power Institute (SCCPI) and the Youth Community Action Program (YCAP).

==== Septima Clark Community Power Institute (SCCPI) ====
The SCCPI summer fellowship program teaches leadership and organization skills to local Atlanta youth ages 14–19. The institute has created several initiatives such as the "10mil4real" Campaign to research the investment of school funds; "Hoops4Peace," a community basketball tournament; and the South Atlanta Youth Assembly, which focuses on youth-led discussions, workshops, and organizing activities.

==== Youth Community Action Program (YCAP) ====
YCAP is an after school program focused on educating and training youth to organize new projects in their community. Members of YCAP created the "Youth Speak Truth" youth-run radio program.

=== Regional Organizing ===
Project South's regional organizing efforts include the Southern Movement Assembly and the Southern People's Initiative.

==== Southern Movement Assembly ====
According to projectsouth.org, the Southern Movement Assembly is "an organizing process and a convergence space that centers the voices and experiences of grassroots leadership on multiple frontlines." The assembly began in 2012 with a gathering of more than 1,000 community leaders and participants. Six assemblies have been held since 2012 in states throughout the south.

==== Southern People's Initiative ====
The Southern People's Initiative works to develop a modern Southern freedom movement with a focus on "people's power, shared resources, cultural insurgency, decolonization, and liberated lives." The initiative came out of the Southern Movement Assembly as a means to connect activists in the region with a common goal.

=== National Projects ===
Project South partners with like-minded organizations on several national projects including the National Student Bill of Rights, the Peoples Movement Assemblies, the US Social Forum, and Up South / Down South.

==== National Student Bill of Rights ====
The National Student Bill of Rights was founded at the Free Minds, Free People conference in Houston in 2009. Its goal is to bring together youth ages 13–25 from around the nation to develop a vision for local and national bills on education.

==== Peoples Movement Assembly ====
The Peoples Movement Assembly is an organizing strategy consisting of bringing together "a constellation of social movement organizations and people that seek to govern themselves." Participants in the assembly are encouraged to discuss social issues and form an agenda for social justice. Project South is one of several organizations that participates in the Peoples Movement Assembly.

==== US Social Forum ====
Founded in 2007, the US Social Forum is a gathering of grassroots organizations to discuss activism strategies. It was inspired by the World Social Forum. Project South was the anchor organization for the inaugural forum. The inaugural forum featured more than 15,000 participants taking part in workshops around Atlanta.

==== Up South / Down South ====
Up South / Down South is an initiative to connect older African Americans and African American youth from the north and south. The initiative was created by Project South and several local Detroit organizations as a part of the U.S. Social Forum in Detroit.

== Association with the Black Lives Matter Movement ==
Some Project South staff members have also gotten involved with the Black Lives Matter movement's efforts to organize civil protests and develop a national agenda.

In the wake of the shooting of eight police officers in Dallas in 2016, Project South and several other activist organizations involved in the Black Lives Matter movement posted an online statement accusing the American people of hypocrisy for mourning the deaths of police officers, but not African Americans killed by the police.
