= Ella Ochoa =

American activist

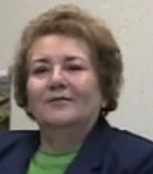
- Ochoa during her "50 in 52" Journey interview
- Born: August 3, 1945; Laredo, Texas, U.S.
- Died: May 5, 2023 (aged 77)
- Known for: NAF Multicultural Human Development Corporation
- Movement: Advocate for migrant workers in Nebraska

Ella Ochoa (born 1945) founded the Nebraska Association of Farmworkers (NAF) in 1979 and operated it until it closed in 2011. She is also an advocate for the rights of disabled individuals.

== Biography ==
Ella Ochoa was born in Laredo in 1945 and raised in Cotulla, Texas. She was dedicated to her family, exceptionally so when she lost her mother and later her father at a young age. While education was a top priority she eventually left her schooling to take on many jobs to support her family. She worked as a migrant farmworker across Texas, North Dakota, and Minnesota.

In 1979, Ochoa co-founded the Nebraska Association of Farmworkers and became its executive director. The organization became the NAF Multicultural Human Development Corporation with advocacy missions for physical, financial, social and educational well-being of seasonal farmworkers, minorities and other disadvantaged persons. She also was a member of the Farmworker Justice Fund Inc between 1995 and 2003.

In 2000, Ochoa was diagnosed with multiple sclerosis and began to advocate for the rights of the disabled. In 2011, she was a volunteer with the Minority Health Advisory Committee for the Nebraska Department of Health and Human Services.

Ella Ochoa died on May 5, 2023, surrounded by family after a long, hard-fought battle with cancer. She is survived by her husband Aurelio Ochoa, her 3 adults sons, and 4 adult grandchildren.

== Nebraska Association of Farmworkers ==
The NAF was an organization headquartered in Nebraska with locations in Scottsbluff, North Platte, Grand Island, Lincoln, and Omaha. While operating from 1979-2011, it offered many benefits to immigrant workers and helped to meet educational, developmental, and social needs.

== Awards ==
Ella Ochoa received The Ohtli Award in 1997, which is one of the highest awards given by the Mexican government to the Mexican community abroad. She also received the Nebraska commission of the status of women “Women of the Year”. In 2005, she received the Cesar Estrada Chavez Award. In 2012, she received the MAFO Lifetime Achievement Award.
