= Ana Recio Harvey =

Mexican economist

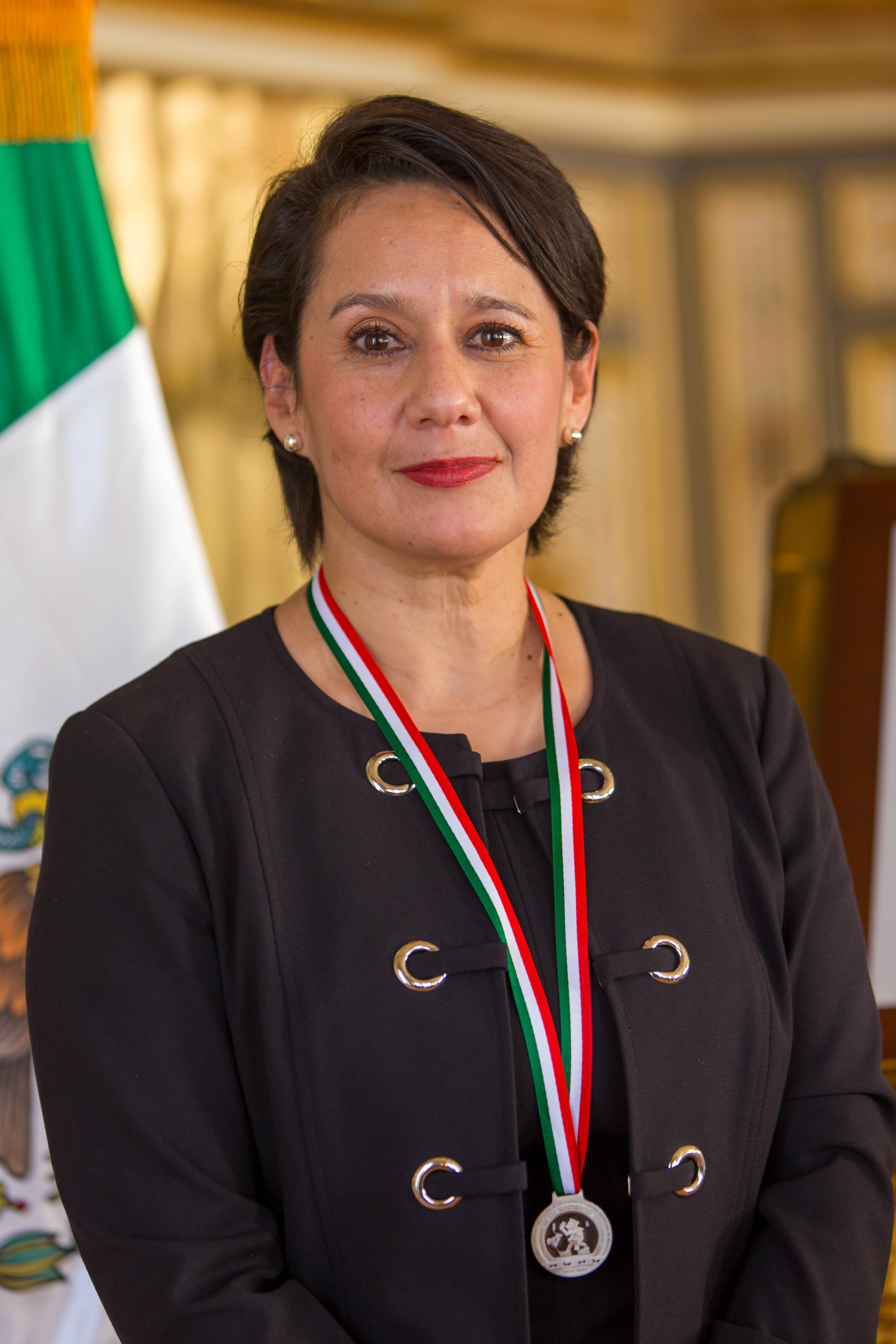
Ana Recio Harvey

Ana Recio Harvey is a Mexican translation entrepreneur and government economic activist who is the president and CEO of the Greater Washington Hispanic Chamber of Commerce (GWHCC). Part of her job working in the United States government involves coordinating and implementing initiatives for the Small Business Administration (SBA) in Washington to benefit small, struggling, women-owned businesses, by offering them federal government contract awards. In January 2015 she was appointed acting director of the District of Columbia Department of Small and Local Business Development (DSLBD). Harvey is the founder of the multilingual communications company Syntaxis, which translates in 25 languages.

== Background ==
Harvey was born in Mexico City. She began a career as a translation consultant in 1991. In 2000 she established Syntaxis, LLC, a multilingual communications company with a number of Fortune 500 clients including companies, government agencies, and nonprofit organizations. Syntaxis grew from a purely English-to-Spanish translation agency into a large scale operation with 75 employees offering services in 25 languages. Harvey studied for a bachelor's degree at the University of Houston.

== Economic activism ==
Building on her career as a translator entrepreneur, she began volunteering with numerous organizations in Mexico City, which led to her appointment as Latino Programs Director for Cultural Tourism DC. The position saw her forge a working relationship with community-based organizations in the Washington DC Metropolitan Area. She has said of her mission: "As a female entrepreneur, I am very familiar with the challenges of starting, financing and growing a business. Finding resources to achieve business goals should not be one of them".

In 2007, Harvey became president and CEO of the Greater Washington Hispanic Chamber of Commerce, and is on the board of the Washington DC Economic Partnership (WDCEP). Part of her job involves in coordinating and implementing initiatives for the Small Business Administration (SBA) in Washington to benefit small, struggling, women-owned businesses, by offering them federal government contract awards. Her work often benefits women, Hispanics, African Americans and other ethnic minorities, and rural America. Between 2009 and 2013 Harvey served as SBA's Assistant Administrator for Women's Business Ownership. In January 2015 she was appointed acting director of the District of Columbia Department of Small and Local Business Development (DSLBD). In September 2015, she received an Ohtli Award from the Mexican government for her service to the Mexican-American and Latino community.
