= Teresa Alonso-Rasgado =

Mechanical engineer

Teresa Alonso Rasgado
- Born: Maria Teresa Alonso-Rasgado; Chihuahua, Mexico
- Education: Instituto Politécnico Nacional (BSc); University of Manchester Institute of Science and Technology (PhD)
- Known for: Science diplomacy
- Awards: Ohtli Award (2016)
- Scientific career
- Fields: Orthopaedic engineering
- Workplaces: Queen Mary University of London; University of Manchester
- Thesis: The effect of vibration on casting surface quality (1999)
- Website: www.sems.qmul.ac.uk/staff/t.alonso

Maria Teresa Alonso-Rasgado is a Professor of Mechanical Engineering and Associate Vice-Principal Strategic Partnerships at Queen Mary University of London.. Previously, she held the post of Dean for Global Engagement in the Faculty of Science and Engineering at Queen Mary University of London. She was awarded the Ohtli Award in 2016, the most significant honour of the Mexican Secretariat of Foreign Affairs. In 2019 she was awarded the Lázaro Cárdenas medal for academic excellence.

== Early life and education ==
Alonso-Rasgado is from Chihuahua. She earned her Bachelor's and Master's degree in civil engineering at the Instituto Politécnico Nacional. She moved to Manchester for her doctoral studies, where she was a graduate student in mechanical engineering at University of Manchester Institute of Science and Technology (UMIST). She completed her PhD in 1999 and was appointed a research fellow in the same department.

== Research and career ==
In 2005 Alonso-Rasgado was appointed a lecturer at the University of Manchester. She was promoted to Professor in 2012, where she was the head of the Bioengineering and Reliability and Maintainability Research Groups. Alonso-Rasgado works on mathematical modelling of biological systems as well as musculoskeletal analysis and biomechanics. This research includes investigation into the biocompatibility and reliability of medical implants. She works on the design of total care functional products that comprise both hardware and software services. Her research has included the development wound healing and scarring models. Alonso-Rasgado was appointed a professor at Queen Mary University of London in 2018.

=== International advocacy ===
From 2010 to 2018 Alonso-Rasgado was the Honorary Representative of the Consejo Nacional de Ciencia y Tecnología, the National Council of Science and Technology of Mexico. She was Director of the Latin American Postgraduate Programme (LAPP) at the University of Manchester, which has partnerships in Latin America, North America and the Caribbean. She ran a series of activities that brought together academics, scientists, students and centre directors from Mexico and the United Kingdom. She was awarded the Ohtli Award for her efforts to promote academic exchange between the United Kingdom and Mexico. At the time, Alonso-Rasgado was a professor at the University of Manchester, which had the highest number of Mexican postgraduate students in the world. She developed scholarship schemes in collaboration with the Organization of American States to support scientists and engineers starting their PhD programmes in the United Kingdom. In 2019 Alonso-Rasgado was awarded the Lázaro Cárdenas medal for academic excellence.

In 2019 Alonso-Rasgado was appointed Dean for Global Engagement at Queen Mary University of London. She has continued her diplomacy work with Mexico, working with the Citibanamex Youth of Excellence program to develop an eight week English language course to prepare Mexican scientists for their postgraduate studies in London. Since joining Queen Mary University of London, Alonso-Rasgado has created, developed, managed, and delivered a Sandpit Initiative in Mexico to develop joint, multidisciplinary, matched-funding research projects between Mexican institutions and QMUL academics in areas including air pollution & cancer diagnosis. In 2020, Alonso-Rasgado negotiated, created, developed and delivered a Dual Master by research (MRes) with the Advanced Materials Research Center (CIMAV) in Mexico. The following year, she created a Dual Master by research (MRes) with the Autonomous University of Baja California (UABC), one of the aims of which is to help address gender inequality in science, technology, engineering, and mathematics (STEM) by targeting female students. In 2021, Alonso-Rasgado created and negotiated a landmark 5-year agreement for Queen Mary University of London with the Polytechnic Foundation (PF) and National Polytechnic Institute (IPN) of Mexico. The agreement covers initiatives ranging from fully funded PhD, PGT and dual degree programmes to joint research funding & CPD courses. in 2022, Alonso-Rasgado created and negotiated another substantial agreement for Queen Mary University of London, this time with the Autonomous University of Baja California (UABC) encompassing a wide range of activities.

In 2026, media reports highlighted difficulties affecting some programmes linked to these agreements. According to reports, a number of students studying in the United Kingdom under funding schemes associated with the Polytechnic Foundation experienced interruptions in financial support, raising concerns about the continuity of their studies. The National Polytechnic Institute stated that it was not responsible for the funding and attributed the situation to the Polytechnic Foundation.
