= Burton E. Grossman =

American businessman

- Born: Burton Edward Grossman; February 15, 1918; Corpus Christi, Texas, U.S.
- Died: November 12, 1999 (aged 81); London, United Kingdom
- Education: University of Texas at Austin; The John Dewey University Consortium of America
- Occupation: Founder of Grupo Continental
- Spouse: Shirley Fleishman

Burton Edward Grossman (February 15, 1918 – November 12, 1999) was an American-Mexican businessman, who was chairman and CEO of Grupo Continental, a holding company established in Tampico, Tamaulipas, Mexico, that owns and operates 46 corporations dealing with soft drinks, sugar refining, mineral water, cooling systems, plastics, and mainly bottling factories for The Coca-Cola Company in Mexico.

== Early life ==
Grossman was born in Corpus Christi, Texas. He completed his education in Business Administration at the University of Texas at Austin. He studied a Doctor of Law at The John Dewey University Consortium of America in New York, and obtained an honorary degree from the same university.

He acquired Mexican citizenship in 1955. Burton married Shirley Fleishman, daughter of Herman Harris Fleishman, son of the founder of Grupo Tampico. They had two children: Cynthia Helene and Bruce Edward Grossman.

== Business career ==
Grossman founded Grupo Continental in 1964. He encouraged the collective benefit, and was one of the main promoters in education in the south of Mexican state Tamaulipas with donations who became a Multipurpose Building on his honor name and San Antonio, Texas. He was also chairman of InterContinental Bank Shares Corporation, and he was member and/or advisor to multiple Boards of Trustees in San Antonio, the Southern United States and in Mexico.

He presided over the board of directors of the Tamaulipas Institute of Higher Education from 1978 to 1999. He contributed with important donations for the development of this university.

Known for his great generosity of time and money to the arts, education and medical research, Grossman is credited for making the largest financial gift in the history of UIW, helping build the International Conference Center and the proposed science and energy center while establishing scholarships for business majors and students in financial need. Grossman received the Ohtli Award from the Mexican government in 1998. Grossman died in November 1999 in London.
