= Iliana de la Vega =

Mexican-born American chef and restaurateur

- De La Vega in 2026

Personal details
- Born: Mexico City, Mexico
- Awards: Ohtli Award (2024)

Iliana de la Vega is a Mexican-born American chef and restaurateur who won the 2022 James Beard Best Chef in Texas Award. In 2019, she was a semifinalist for the Best Chef Southwest award.

The Mexican Government gave her the Ohtli Award in 2014.

== Biography ==
De La Vega was born and raised in Mexico City. Her mother and maternal family are from Oaxaca, while her father is from Guanajuato.

She moved to her mother's hometown of Oaxaca in 1997 where she opened El Naranjo. In 2012, she opened a location in Austin, Texas.

De La Vega served as the Mexican/Latin Cuisines Specialist for the Culinary Institute of America from 2007 until 2012. At the San Antonio campus, “she conducted research, developed curricula and taught undergraduate, graduate and continuing education courses on Mexican and other Latin cuisines while creating and launching the Latin Cuisines Certificate Program.”

With her daughter Isabel, she began Mexican Culinary Traditions which offers cooking classes and guided tours.
