= Nancy "Rusty" Barceló =

American academic

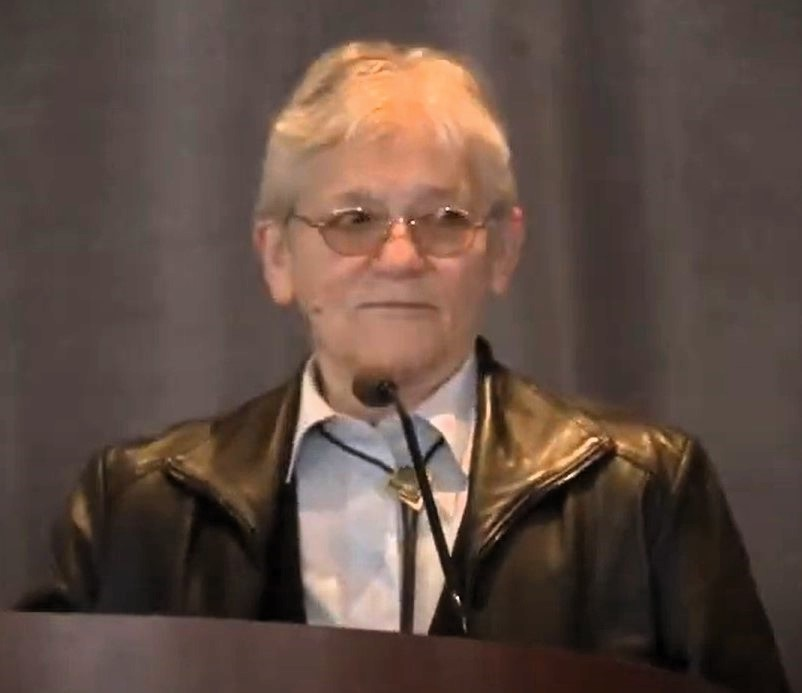
Barceló in 2018

Nancy “Rusty” Barceló (born June 5, 1946) is the former president of Northern New Mexico College. She is a leading figure with the National Initiative for Women in Higher Education (NIWHE). She has chaired Mujeres Activas en Letras y Cambio Social (MALCS) as well as the Washington State Native American Advisory Board (NAAB). In 2004, Barceló was awarded the Ohtli award, which is a special recognition presented by the Mexican government to Mexicans or Latinos whose work has benefited Mexicans living abroad. In addition, Barcelo was a University of Iowa alum who also held positions at the University of Iowa and later at the University of Minnesota, as well as the University of Washington.

== Early life ==
Barceló was born in Merced, California on June 5, 1946. In an interview with Barceló for the University of Washington, Barceló recounts a story of how she came to have her nickname, Rusty. "When the UW’s new vice president for minority affairs started kindergarten, she told the teacher her name was Rusty Barcelo. “Oh,” the teacher replied, “You must be Nancy.” Barcelo didn’t argue but she went home and told her mother she wasn’t going back to school. “That teacher says my name is Nancy,” she complained. Her mother, who knew Barcelo had been christened Nancy Virginia but was called Rusty because of her red hair, replied that she would have to go to school, and tried to explain the mix-up. So Barcelo returned, but insisted that she be called Rusty. “I knew that’s who I was,” she explains. “And that’s the name I’ve used almost ever since."

== Education ==
Barceló first began her collegiate career at Chico State University where she earned her Bachelor of Arts degree in Social Welfare and Corrections in 1969. After this Barceló went to the University of Iowa as for graduate school in 1970. Barceló earned her Master of Arts in Recreational Education in 1972. After a time spent working in Oregon, Barceló returned to the University of Iowa in 1980 where she became the first Mexican-American to receive a doctoral degree from the University of Iowa.

=== Student organizations ===
- 1971 Chicano Indian-American Student Union (CIASU) - founded by Antonio Zavalla and Ruth Pushetonequa and Nancy Barceló

== Career ==
- 1973-1975 Coordinator of Educational Opportunity Services at the University of Oregon
- 1982 - 1996 University of Iowa
  - Acting Director of Affirmative Action (1982-1983)
  - Director of Summer Session (1981-1987)
  - Associate Director, Opportunity at Iowa, (1987-1994)
  - Assistant Dean (1981-1995)
  - Assistant Provost, Opportunity at Iowa (1995-1996)
- 1996-2001 Associate Vice President for Multicultural Affairs and the Chair of the Chicana Studies Department at the University of Minnesota
- 2001 Vice President for Minority Affairs and Diversity at the University of Washington in Seattle
- July 2010-15 President of Northern New Mexico College

== Conferences and symposia ==
- Counselor Leadership Development Conference, 1976
- National Hispanic Feminist Conference, March 1980
- Illinois Hispanic Women’s Conference, October 1981
- Networking Together III, August, 1982
- Women’s Education: The Future, February 1983
- Chicano Culture and its Mexican Roots-Draft, April 1983
- The Way Up: Women in Higher Education, May 1983
- American Association for Higher Education: Forum on Hispanics in Higher Education, March 1984
- Cross-Cultural Projections of Women, October 1984
- Hispanic Americans: Immigration and Education, March 1985
- Beyond 1984: Technology, Training and Higher Education, 1985
- Hispanic Leadership Conference, May 1989
- Nebraska Women of Color Conference 1985 and 1992
- New Latin American Cinema II, October 1986
- Displaced Homemakers Leadership Conference, May 1988
- Articulation Conferences: Regents Committee on Educational Relations (RCER), 1987 and 1989
- A Look to the Future, March and April 1988

== Publications and presentations ==
- University of the Philippines, International Studies Center, A Chicana's Perspective: Crossing Boarders for Institutional Transformation, Keynote Panel, July, 2015.
- California State University, Fresno, President’s Commission on Human Relations and Equity: Diversity Forum, Diversity and Inclusion Toward Institutional Transformation, Keynote Speaker February, 2014
- Chicana Latina Studies: The Journal of Mujeres Activas En Letras Y Cambio Social. 2014. “Through A President's Eyes: Reflections on Institutional Violence.”
- Third Biennial Policy Summit on Latino Higher Education. University of New Mexico, October 2014. Panel Presentation: “Assessing the Continued Challenge of Latino/as in Leadership and Faculty Roles, and Overcoming Institutional Barriers that resist Diversity, Equity, Inclusion and Social Justice;”
- Sixth Biennial Keeping Our Faculty of Color Symposium. University of Minnesota, April 15. 2013. Panel presentation: “A Retrospective Discussion on Keeping our Faculty: Lessons Learned and Ongoing Challenges;”
- Chancellor’s Panel at the Women of Color in the Academy National Conference. University of Illinois, Urbana, IL, April 4, 2013. Journeys into Leadership: Lessons to be Learned.

== Awards and distinctions ==
- University of Minnesota : Nancy "Rusty" Barceló Scholarship
- University of Iowa: Nancy "Rusty" Barceló Scholarship
- NACCS (National Association for Chicana and Chicano Studies) 2012 Scholar
- Ohtli award in 2004
