= Luz Maria Frias =

American attorney

- Born: September 6, 1962 (age 63)
- Education: University of Illinois Chicago (BA); University of Iowa (JD)
- Occupation: Attorney

Luz Maria Frias (born September 6, 1962) is an American attorney best known for public service and advocacy for racial equity. She served as Deputy Attorney General for the state of Minnesota and president and CEO of YWCA Minneapolis.

== Early life and education ==
Frias was born on September 9, 1962 and grew up in West Side, Chicago, her parents having immigrated to the United States from Mexico in the 1950s. By age 11, she was helping people around her community by interpreting Spanish for them at the unemployment office. After skipping her junior year of high school, she was encouraged to apply to college by her algebra teacher; her parents originally intended to have Frias work after high school, and she applied without their consent.

Frias earned her BA in criminal justice from the University of Illinois Chicago. She later earned both her master's degree and Juris Doctor from the University of Iowa.

== Career ==
Frias started her career as a public defender. In the early 1990s, she was both the chief legal officer and CEO of Centro Legal, an organization that offered free legal representation in matters of immigration law and family law. She later served as a court magistrate for Minnesota's Second and Fourth Judicial Districts. Frias worked under St. Paul Mayor Chris Coleman as the first director of the Human Rights and Equal Economic Opportunity Department.

In 1991, Frias helped found the Minnesota Hispanic Bar Association. She also served as the vice president for community development at The Minneapolis Foundation, working to overcome institutional barriers within the city.

Frias took over as president and CEO of YWCA Minneapolis in 2016. During her tenure, she focused on early childhood education, public policy, and racial justice, and lectured on topics including implicit bias, structural racism, and immigration policy. In 2020, she was appointed Deputy Attorney General for Minnesota by Keith Ellison. In this role, Frias oversaw multiple divisions, led equity efforts, and reinstated the office mentoring program. She retired in September 2023. Ellison described Frias as "one of a kind" with a "sharp legal mind".

== Awards and honors ==
Frias is the recipient of the Ohtli Award, issued by Mexico's Ministry of Foreign Affairs, which honors individuals for service to communities of Mexican origin.

In 2018, Frias received the Myra Bradwell Award, an award given out to those who exemplify the behaviors of Myra Bradwell on issues of women.

In 2023, she received the Public Lawyer Diversity Award from the Minnesota State Bar Association.
