= Gabriela Teissier =

American journalist

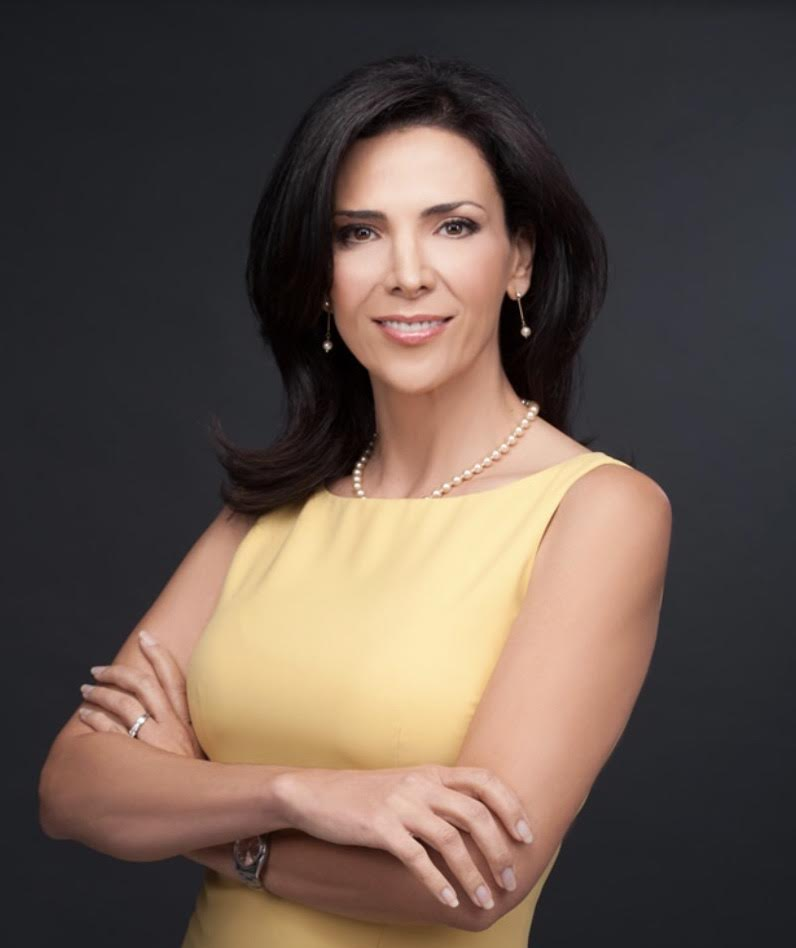
- Born: January 18, 1966 (age 60); Mexico City
- Education: Universidad Iberoamericana
- Occupation: Journalist/news personality
- Employer: Univision
- Notable work: A Primera Hora
- Television: KMEX-DT
- Board member of: ACT Today American Heart Association SAG-AFTRA
- Relatives: Adriana Teissier Zavala

Gabriela Teissier Zavala (born January 18, 1966) is a journalist, news anchor and radio talk show host. Based in Los Angeles, she is the primetime anchor for Noticiero Univision Univision's Los Angeles station KMEX-DT including Univision Sunday morning political news program Al Punto California. Previously, she was the anchor for the early morning news formerly known as A Primera Hora on Univision's Los Angeles station KMEX-DT, and hosted Uforia Audio Network's morning radio show, Tu Voz En Los Angeles. and is known for her environmental issue reports.

== Early life ==
Teissier was born and raised in Mexico City. She attended the German school Colegio Aleman Alexander Von Humboldt in Mexico City and then graduated from the Universidad Iberoamericana in Mexico City.

Growing up she developed a passion and interest in environmental journalism being influenced by her father, Ernesto Julio Teissier, who was a prominent political analyst in Mexico.

Teissier is the sister of Adriana Paulina Teissier Zavala, who is currently the Federal Deputy for the State of Quintana Roo, Mexico.

== Career ==
=== Music ===
As a child, Teissier toured doing background vocals for singers such as Luis Miguel, Cristian Castro, José José and Guadalupe Pineda. She also did vocals as Terk for Phil Collins's single titled "Rompiendo el Campamento" that featured in the Spanish version of the 1999 Tarzan soundtrack.

=== Television ===
In college, she acted in television commercials and played the role of "Terk" in Spanish in the Disney movie Tarzan, Acapulco H.E.A.T. and Cinemamotion.

Her first role in news media was an anchor woman for MVS TV Noticias in Telerey, Mexico She came to the United States in the late 1990s when she was offered a job to anchor Edicion Especial Midday show on Telemundo Network. After Telemundo, worked for Univision as anchor of their midday show Escandalo TV for the launch of Unimas, formerly known as Telefutura network. She returned to California in 2003 and became a co-anchor of the early morning news show, A Primera Hora on Univision's Los Angeles station KMEX-DT, formerly known as Primera Edicion. She currently anchors the primetime for Univision's Los Angeles station KMEX-DT.

=== Radio ===
Teissier was one of the two morning radio show hosts of "Tu Voz En Los Angeles" on Univision's Los Angeles flagship talk radio station, KTNQ 1020 AM.

=== Achievements ===
She received "Best News Anchor" award from the Los Angeles Press Club and has won six local Emmy Awards including Telly awards for her anchoring, reporting, producing and writing.

Teissier received the "Excellence in Broadcast Journalism Impact Award" from the National Hispanic Media Coalition and has been recognized by the California State Senate and the City of Los Angeles for her significant contributions to the community through her stories on environmental, social and education issues.

In 2015, Teissier became an alumna of Metcalf Institute’s "Change and the News Science Seminar: Planning for Rising Seas and Extreme Weather."

In 2016, Teissier was awarded the Ohtli Award administered by the Secretariat of Foreign Affairs.

On April 17, 2023, Teissier hosted a panel with the NAB President and CEO, Curtis LeGeytthe at the NAB Show in Las Vegas.

On January 20, 2025, she represented Univision at the inauguration of Donald Trump as the 47th president of the United States which took place at the United States Capitol rotunda in Washington, D.C.

== Personal life ==
Teissier resides in Los Angeles with her two sons.

== Philanthropy ==
Teissier is currently on the board of directors for ACT Today, a non-profit organization for Autism, and on the board of trustees of the SAG-AFTRA; she previously served as a board member of the American Heart Association.

In 2020, she moderated the KPFK live stream program called "Strength Thru Unity": Black & Brown Lives Sowing the Seed of Change to foster, inspire, and help develop collaborations between Latinos and African Americans for social justice and panelists included Dolores Huerta.

In 2023, Teissier who is a German-speaking anchor spoke to German journalists at the RIAS Berlin Commission event in Los Angeles about her work at KMEX-DT, learning German at school and the thriving Hispanic community in California and the issues they are also facing.

== Awards ==
- The National Hispanic Media Coalition, NHMC 2011 Impact Award for Excellence in Broadcast Journalism
- LA Press Club 2014 Award for Best Anchor
- Telly Award 2015 Presenter "Pasaporte al Mundial Show"
- Los Angeles area Emmy Award winning story "Cambio Climatico 101"- 2017
- Los Angeles area Emmy Award for Best Light News Story (multi-part) "Junipero Serra"- 2016
- Heal The Bay Walk The Talk Award 2018
- SPJ Distinguished Journalist for Television 2019
