= Veronica Serrato =

American immigration lawyer

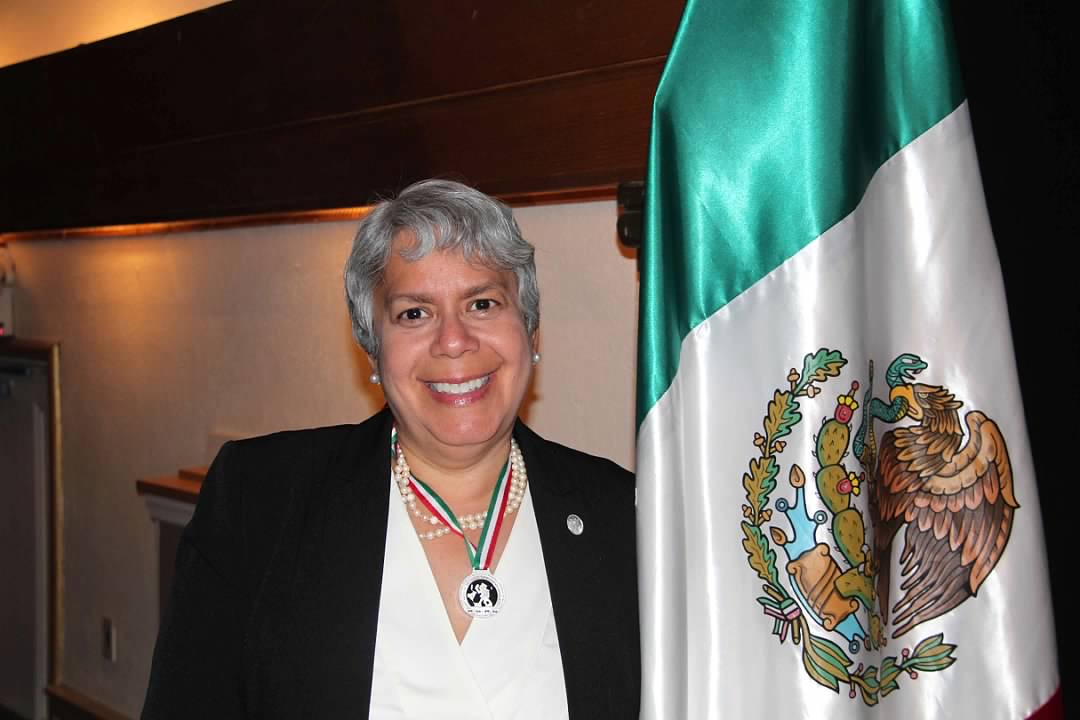
Cinco de mayo award presentation, Veronica Serrato

Veronica Serrato is an American immigration lawyer. She is a recipient of the Ohtli Award, the highest award given by the Mexican government to people serving Mexicans abroad.

== Education and early life ==
Serrato was born in Chicago; her parents immigrated to the US from Moroleon, Guanajuato, Mexico. Serrato attended Harvard University for her undergraduate degree (A.B. in 1984) and Boston University School of Law for her J.D, graduating in 1988. She was the first in her family to attend college.

== Career ==
Serrato was the founding executive director of Project Citizenship, a non-profit focused on helping legal permanent residents (green card holders) become American citizens. Under her leadership, 8,300 immigrants achieved US citizenship. According to Congresswoman Katherine Clark (D-MA), it is the largest citizenship provider in New England. They are "unapologetically pro-immigrant."

In 2019, Project Citizenship and Ropes and Gray sued USCIS for their plan to remove fee waivers for the naturalization process.

Prior to Project Citizenship, Serrato served as a Senior Attorney at Volunteer Lawyers Project. She served as a Clinical Instructor and later, Domestic Violence Specialist, at the Legal Services Center of Harvard Law School, where she handled domestic violence cases.

== Awards and honors ==
- Ohtli Award, Mexican government, 2018
- Silver Shingle Award, Boston University School of Law, 2017
- Guest of Congresswoman Katherine Clark, State of the Union Address, 2017
- Sarah B. Ignatius Award for Excellence in Law, PAIR Project, Boston, June 2020
- Spirit of Boston award, Mayor Martin Walsh, November 2019
- Massachusetts Association of Hispanic Attorneys, 2019 Organization of the Year Award
- Massachusetts Lawyers Weekly Top Women in the Law Award, October 2014
- Boston University School of Law Public Interest Attorney Award, April 13, 2014
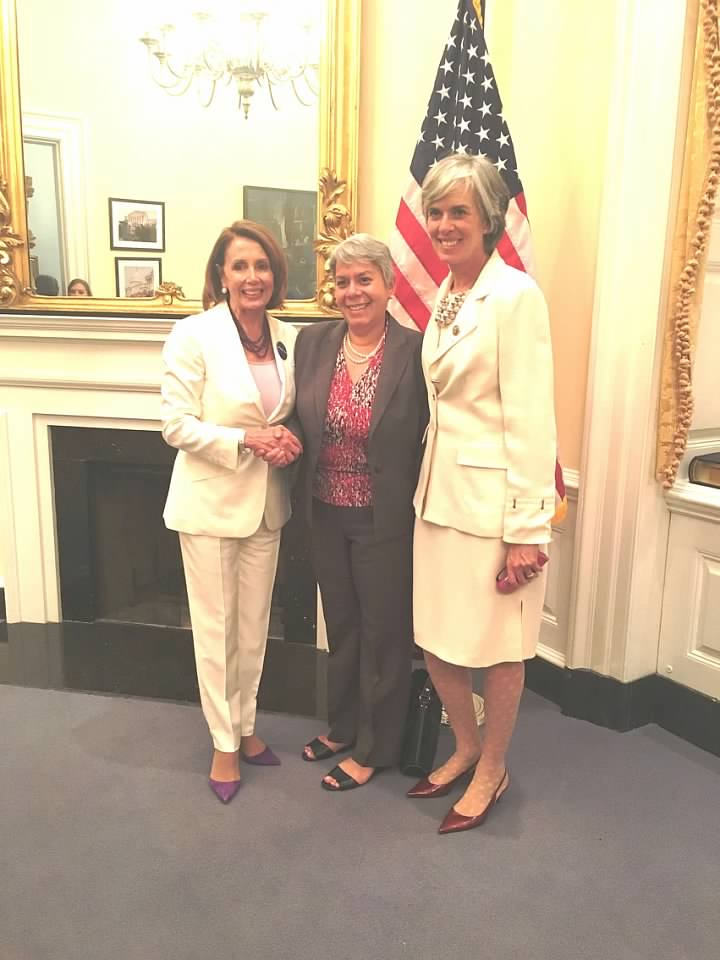
  Speaker of the House Nancy Pelosi, Veronica Serrato, and Congresswoman Katherine Clark
- Victor Garo Public Service Award, Boston University School of Law, 2015
- Community Hero, ABCD
