= Dionicio Morales =

American activist (1918–2008)

Dionicio Morales (1918, Yuma, Arizona – September 24, 2008, Beverly Hospital, Montebello, California) was a Mexican-American civil rights leader and social entrepreneur. Morales was the founder of the Mexican American Opportunity Foundation (MAOF), the largest Mexican American nonprofit in the nation. He spent his life fighting segregation and prejudice in the United States. His abilities to work with corporate and political leaders opened the doors and jobs for thousands of Mexican Americans in the U.S. His relationship with President Lyndon Johnson allowed MOAF to win significant civil rights victories for Mexican Americans. His civil rights activism earned him recognition as “an urban Cesar Chavez” and social entrepreneur. He worked tirelessly inspiring several new generations of Mexican American business and political leaders as he pursued his vision of a U.S.A. where all Latinos have equal educational and workplace opportunities.

== Biography ==
Morales was the first of his parents' 11 children who came of age during the Great Depression era in the then-rural community of Moorpark, California. His parents were Mexican immigrants who had settled in Southern California to work in the agricultural fields. Competition for work during the Great Depression worsened anti-Mexican sentiments and Los Angeles County set up a fund to finance their expulsion. Those who remained suffered numerous hardships including deplorable living conditions and a lack of adequate health care, which contributed to widespread tuberculosis. Morales nearly died of the disease just as seven of his siblings did. In school, Mexican and Mexican American children were separated from Anglo students and prohibited from speaking in Spanish with the threat of corporal punishment. These injustices led him to dedicate his life's work to bettering the plight of Mexican Americans.

Morales studied at Santa Barbara State Teacher's College and became a compliance officer with the Bracero program, which brought Mexican workers to the U.S. to labor in the fields and factories depleted of workers by the war effort. It was here he first met Cesar Chavez. He worked as a probation officer for Mexican American youth and later as a labor organizer in East Los Angeles. His years in East L.A. helped lay the groundwork for forming the Mexican American Opportunity Foundation in 1963. In 1978, Morales became the first Mexican American, through MOAF, to be the recipient of a million-dollar government contract.

Morales was awarded an Ohtli Award in 1997 from the Mexican government for his work in activism and MAOF. In 1998, Morales wrote his autobiography, Dionicio Morales: A Life in Two Cultures, where he described his family's migration from Mexico and their fight against poverty and discrimination in the United States.

Morales died in Beverly Hospital in Montebello, California.

== Mexican American Opportunity Foundation ==
MAOF has become the largest social services provider in the United States, serving more than 100,000 Californians and providing childcare for roughly 8,000 children daily. The first job training contract came when Morales decided to call the president for help with funding. He was able to get through to Vice President Lyndon B. Johnson, who helped him meet the Secretary of Labor who granted MOAF a $37,000 training contract. Mr. Morales developed relationships with corporate giants, including Kraft Foods, Rockwell International, McDonnell Douglas, and Lockheed Martin that would lead to many jobs for Mexican Americans. MAOF still works in job training but 80 percent of its $57 million budget goes to child care programs that enable parents to work. Morales had retired from working with the foundation eight years before his death.
