= Levi Strauss & Co. =

American clothing company

Coordinates: 37°48′10″N 122°24′10″W

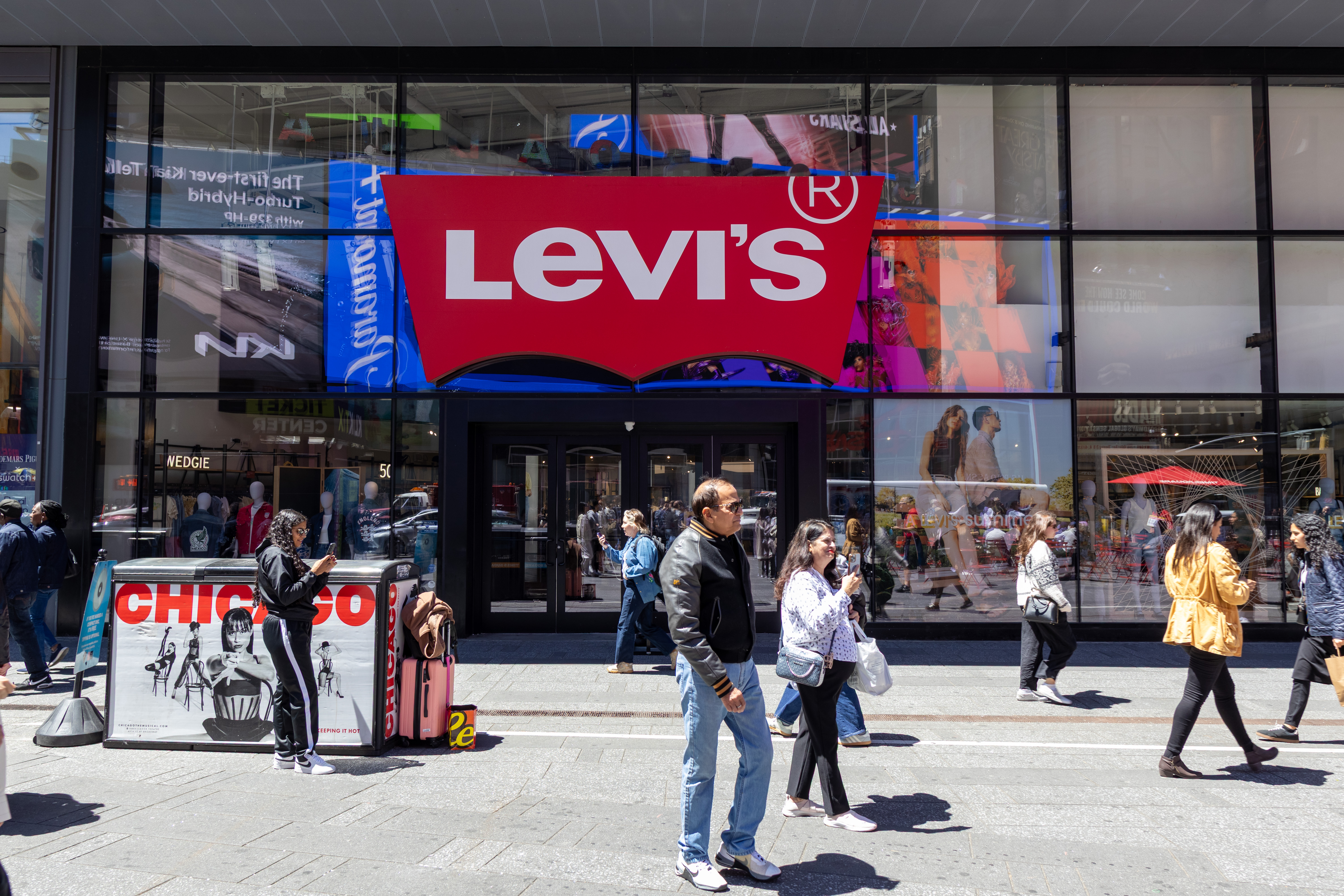
- Levi's flagship store in Times Square
- Type: Public
- Traded as: NYSE: LEVI (Class A)
- ISIN: US52736R1023
- Industry: Textile
- Founded: May 1, 1853; 173 years ago in San Francisco, California, U.S.
- Founder: Levi Strauss
- Headquarters: Levi's Plaza, San Francisco, California, U.S.
- Number of locations: 3,300 company-operated stores (2025)
- Area served: Worldwide
- Key people: Robert Eckert (chairman); Michelle Gass (CEO); John Vandemore (CFO)
- Products: Clothing
- Brands: Levi's; Denizen; Levi Strauss Signature
- Revenue: ▲US$6.28 billion (2025)
- Operating income: ▲US$678 million (2025)
- Net income: ▲US$578 million (2025)
- Total assets: ▲US$6.85 billion (2025)
- Total equity: ▲US$2.28 billion (2025)
- Number of employees: 19,000 (2025)
- Website: levistrauss.com; levi.com

Levi Strauss & Co. (Note: Pronunciation: /ˈliːvaɪ ˈstraʊs/, LEE-vy STROWSS) is an American clothing company known worldwide for its Levi's (Note: Pronunciation: /ˈliːvaɪz/, LEE-vyze) brand of denim jeans. It was founded in May 1853 when German-Jewish immigrant Levi Strauss moved from New York City, New York, to San Francisco, California, to open a West Coast branch of his brothers' New York dry goods business. The corporation is registered in Delaware and its headquarters is located in Levi's Plaza in San Francisco.

== History ==
=== Origin and formation (1853–1890s) ===
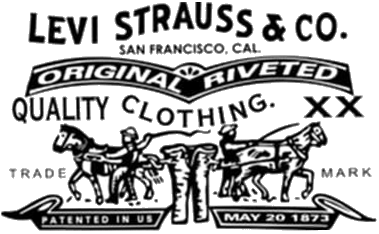
The original Levi Strauss logo, 1892

In 1858, the company was listed as Strauss, Levi (David Stern & Lewis Strauss) importers clothing, etc. 63 & 65 Sacramento St. (today, on the current grounds of the 353 Sacramento Street Lobby) in the San Francisco Directory with Strauss serving as its sales manager and his brother-in-law, David Stern, as its manager.

Jacob Davis, a Latvian-Jewish immigrant, was a Reno, Nevada tailor who frequently purchased bolts of denim cloth from Levi Strauss & Co.'s wholesale house. After one of Davis's customers kept purchasing cloth to reinforce torn pants, he thought of using copper rivets to reinforce points of strain, such as on pocket corners and the base of the button fly. Davis lacked sufficient funds to obtain a patent, so he wrote to Strauss proposing a business partnership. After Strauss accepted Davis's offer, the two men received U.S. patent 139,121 from the United States Patent and Trademark Office on May 20, 1873. The copper rivet was incorporated into the company's jean design and advertisements. In 1890, the rivet patent entered the public domain; the same year, lot numbers were assigned to company products, and "501" was used to designate the famous copper-riveted waist overalls. The company lost its records in the 1906 earthquake and there is no information on why that number was chosen.

=== Growth in popularity (1910s–1960s) ===
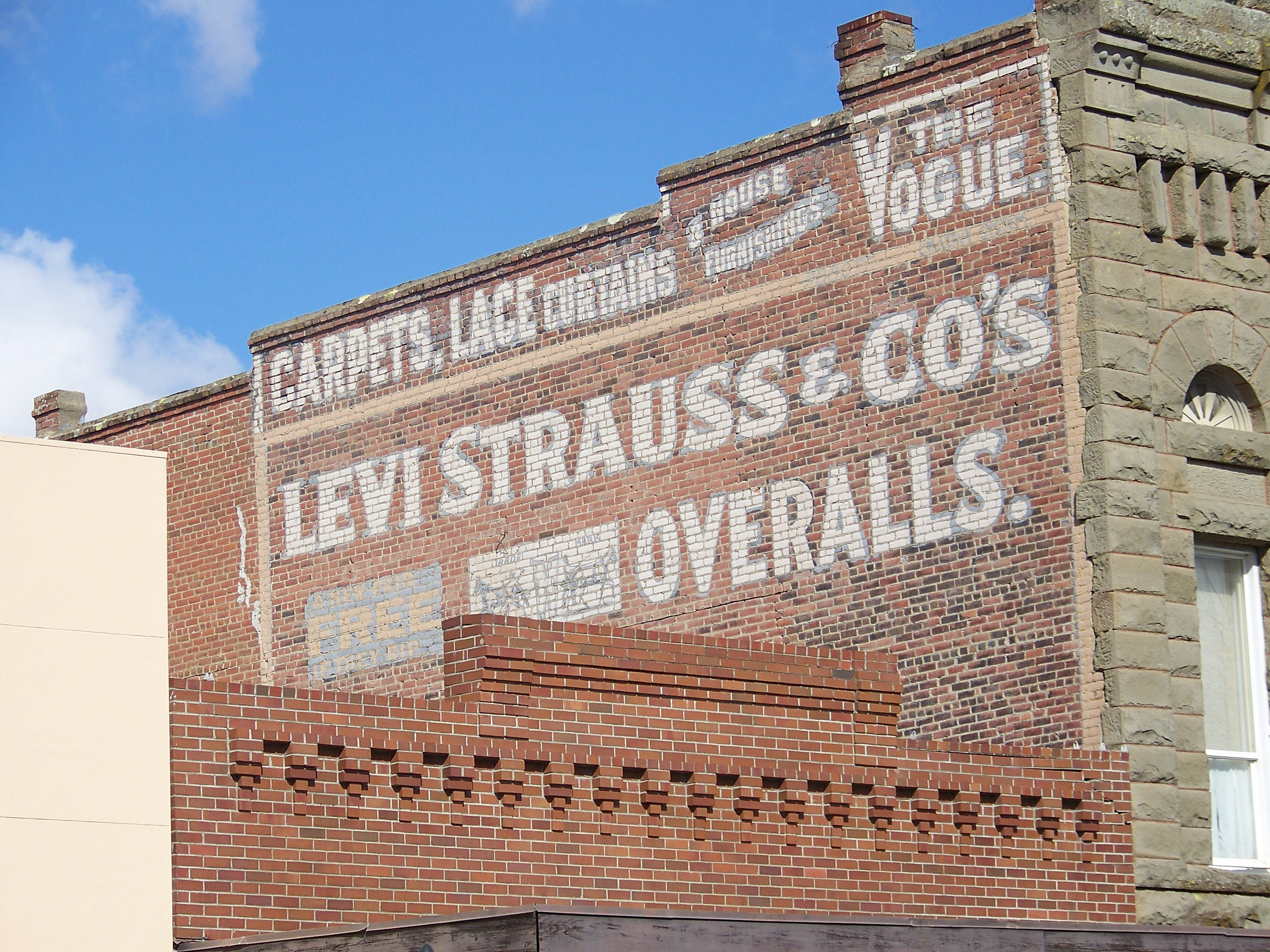
Levi Strauss advertising on a building in Woodland, California

Between the 1950s and 1980s, Levi's jeans became popular among a wide range of youth subcultures, including greasers, mods, rockers, and hippies. Levi's popular shrink-to-fit 501s were sold as labeled, sized as manufactured, and had substantial shrinkage upon laundering. The crotch rivet, watch pocket rivets, and waist cinch were removed during World War II to conform with War Production Board metal conservation rules and only the watch pocket rivets restored after. Additionally, the back pocket rivets, which had been covered in denim since 1937 to prevent scratching furniture, were removed in the 1950s (and replaced by bar tacks) as they eventually wore through and caused the problem anyway.

=== Blue jeans era (1960s–1980s) ===
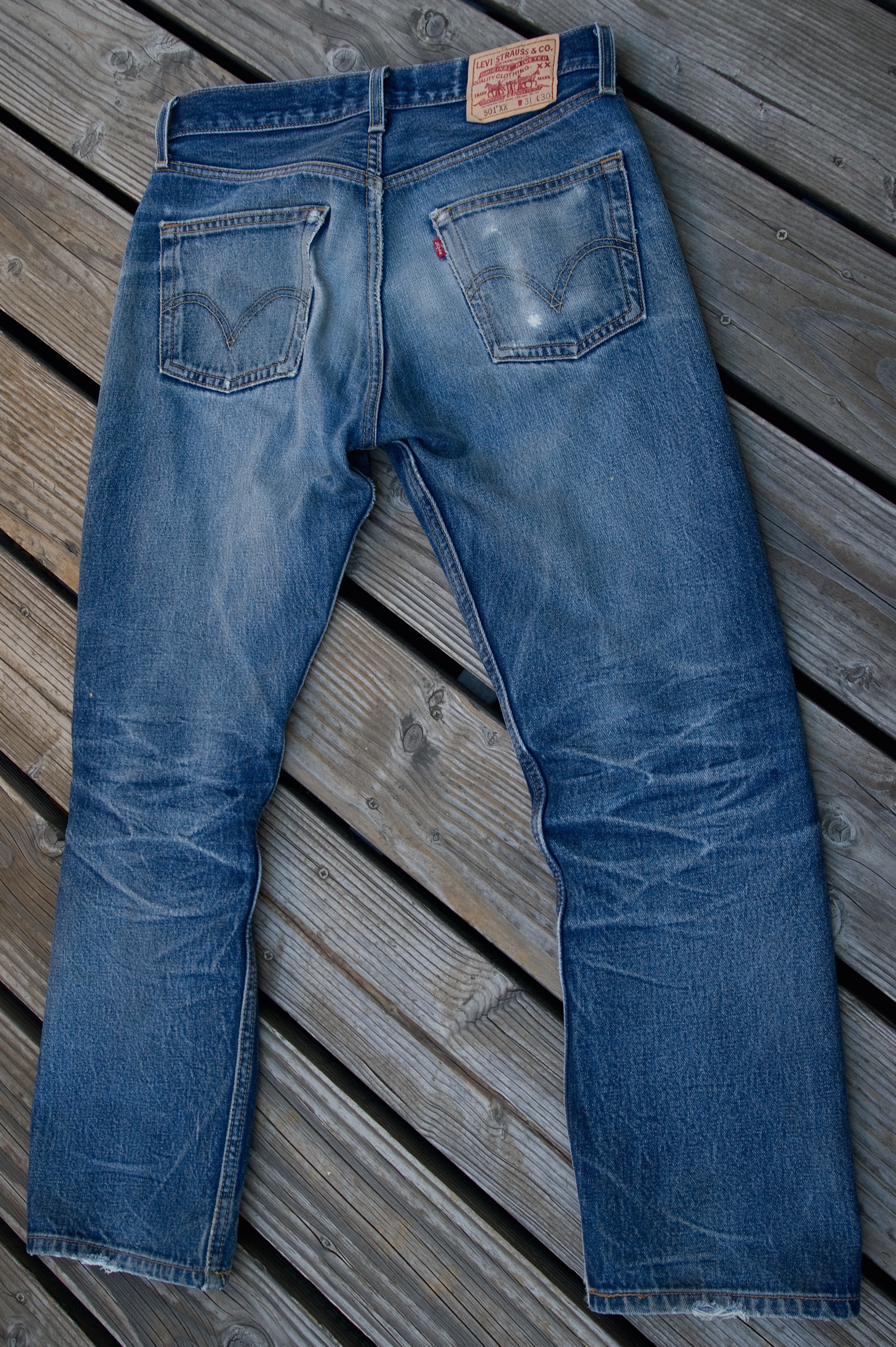
A pair of Levi's 501 jeans

Levi's, under the leadership of Walter Haas, Peter Haas Sr., Paul Glasco, and George P. Simpkins Sr., expanded the firm's clothing line by adding new fashions and models. In 1969, Levi's introduced the "Orange Tab" line, a collection of youth-oriented apparel that offered experimental cuts and fabrics, such as bell-bottoms and poly-blends, that differentiated the line from the traditional Red Tab. Levi's also introduced "stone-washed" jeans through the acquisition of Great Western Garment Co. (GWG), a Canadian clothing manufacturer, a technique still in use by Levi Strauss. Simpkins is credited with the company's record-paced expansion of its manufacturing capacity from 16 plants to more than 63 in the US – and 23 overseas – from 1964 to 1974.

The Dockers brand, launched in 1986 and sold primarily through department store chains, helped the company grow through the mid-1990s, as denim sales began to wane. Dockers were introduced into Europe in 1996 and led by CEO Jorge Bardina. Levi Strauss attempted to sell the Dockers division in 2004 to relieve part of the company's $2.6 billion outstanding debt. In February 2026, the company sold Dockers to brand management firm Authentic Brands Group for $311 million.

=== Brand competition (1990s) ===
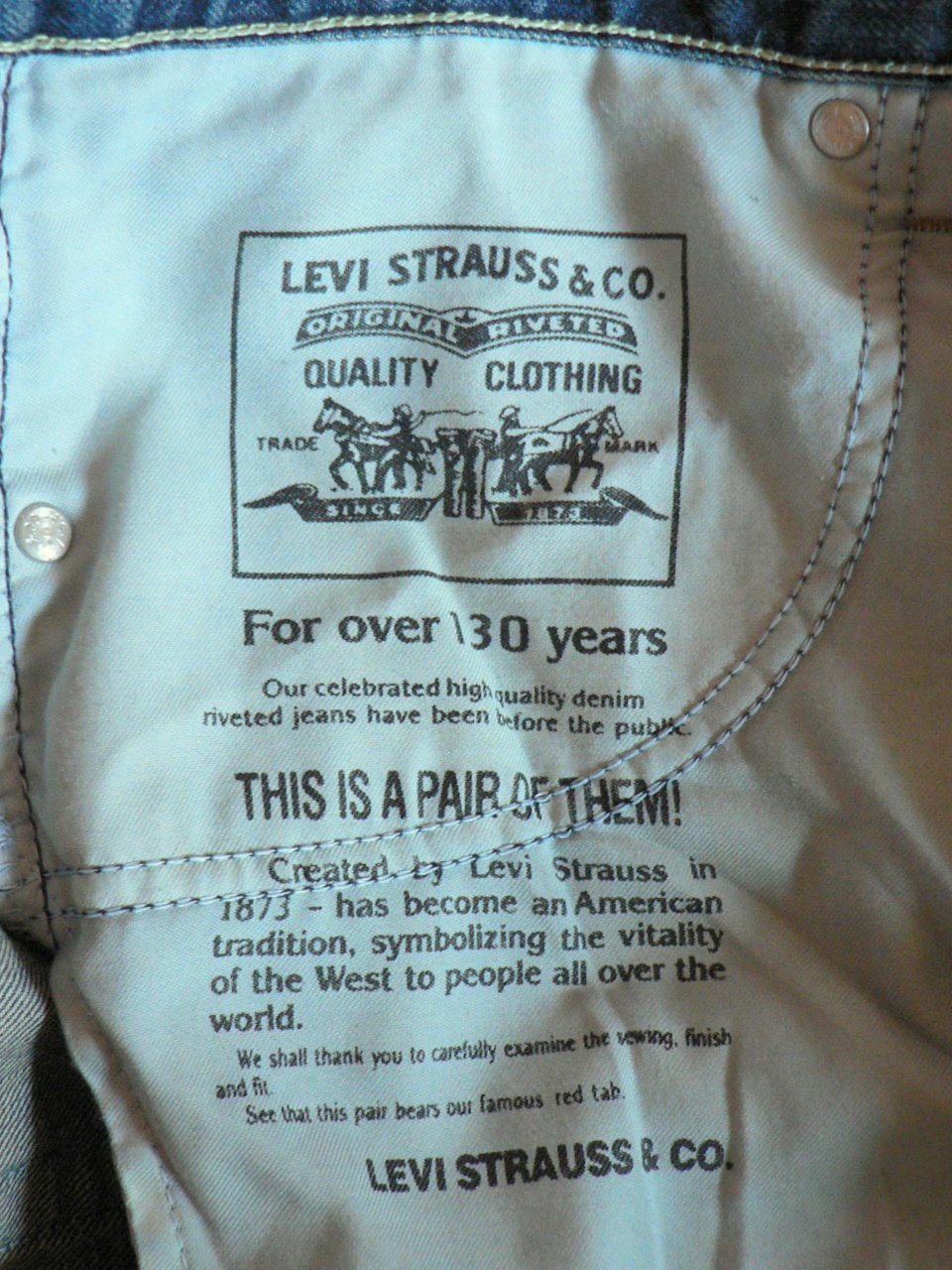
Levi's 506 zip fly jeans

In 1991, Levi Strauss became implicated in a scandal involving pants made in the Northern Mariana Islands: some 3% of Levi's jeans sold annually with the "Made in the USA" label were shown to have been made by Chinese laborers under what the U.S. Department of Labor called slave-like conditions. As of 2016, only a few of the costlier higher-end styles are made domestically.

Cited for sub-minimum wages, seven-day work weeks with 12-hour shifts, poor living conditions, and other workplace abuses, Tan Holdings Corporation, Levi Strauss' Marianas subcontractor, paid what were then the largest fines in US labor history, distributing more than $9 million in restitution to some 1,200 employees. Levi Strauss claimed no knowledge of the offenses, severed ties to the Tan family, and instituted labor reforms and inspection practices in its offshore facilities.

The activist group Fuerza Unida (United Force) formed following the January 1990 closure of a plant in San Antonio, Texas, in which 1,150 seamstresses – some of whom had worked for Levi Strauss for decades – saw their jobs exported to Costa Rica. During the mid- and late 1990s, Fuerza Unida picketed the Levi Strauss headquarters in San Francisco and staged hunger strikes and sit-ins in protest of the company's labor policies.

The company took on multibillion-dollar debt in February 1996 to help finance a series of private leveraged stock buyouts among family members determined to consolidate the company under their ownership. At the time, shares in Levi Strauss stock were not publicly traded. As of 2016, the firm was owned almost entirely by indirect descendants and collateral relatives of Levi Strauss, whose four nephews inherited the San Francisco dry-goods firm after their uncle died in 1902. The corporation's bonds are traded publicly, as are shares of the company's Japanese affiliate, Levi Strauss Japan K.K.

In June 1996, the company offered to pay its workers an unusual dividend of up to $750 million in six years, having halted an employee-stock plan during the internal family buyout. However, the company failed to make cash-flow targets, and no worker dividends were paid.

=== Later developments (2000–present) ===
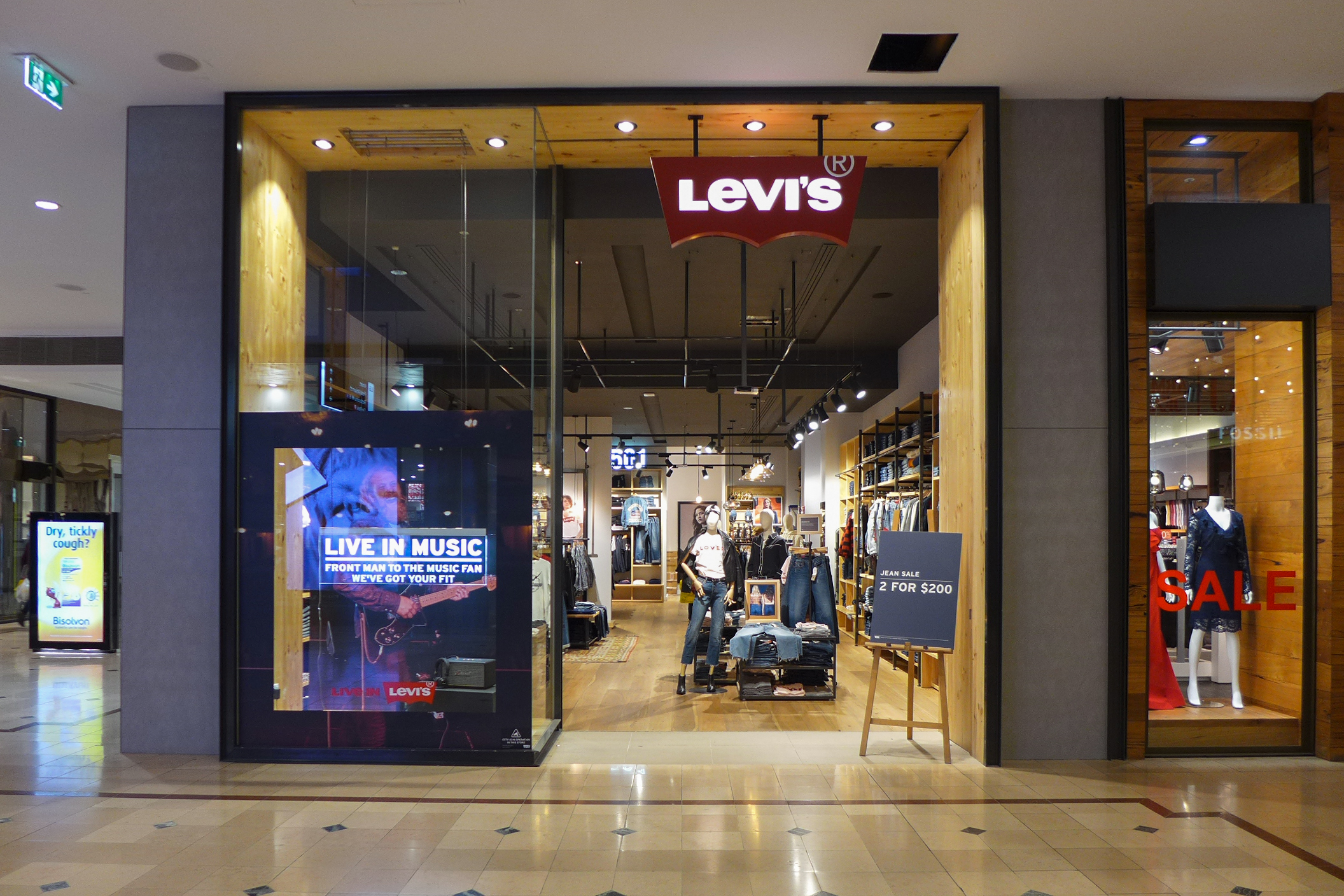
A Levi's store in Chadstone Shopping Centre in Melbourne, Australia

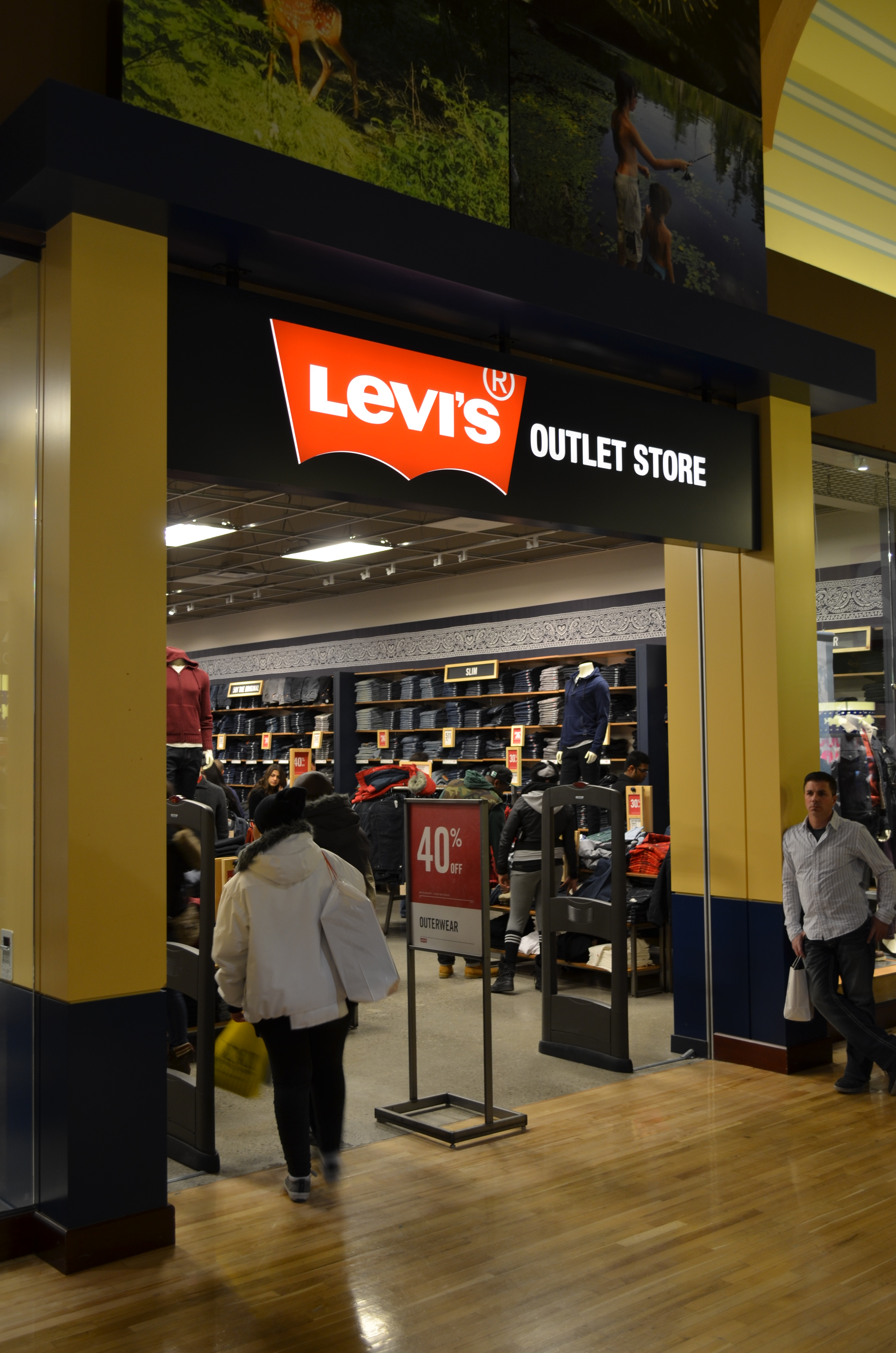
A Levi's outlet store in Vaughan Mills in Vaughan, Ontario

In 2002, Levi Strauss began a close business collaboration with Walmart, producing a line of "Signature" jeans and other clothes for sale only in Walmart stores until 2006.

In 2002, the company closed its San Francisco Valencia Street plant, (built in 1906). By the end of 2003, the closure of Levi's last U.S. factory in San Antonio ended 150 years of jeans made in the United States. Production of a few higher-end, more expensive styles of jeans resumed in the U.S. several years later. Levi Strauss closed several factories worldwide and took control of GWG's operations. Attempts to make the GWG brand profitable again were unsuccessful, and the Edmonton GWG factory, along with all remaining Levi Strauss factories in North America, closed in 2004.

By 2007, Levi Strauss was again profitable after declining sales in nine of the previous ten years. Its total annual sales of just over $4 billion were $3 billion less than during its peak performance in the mid-1990s.

As of 2007, Levi Strauss leads the apparel industry in trademark infringement cases, filing nearly 100 lawsuits against competitors over six years from 2001. Most cases center on the alleged imitation of Levi's back pocket double arc stitching pattern (U.S. trademark No. 1,139,254), which Levi's filed for a trademark in 1978. Levi's has successfully sued Guess, Polo Ralph Lauren, Esprit Holdings, Zegna, Zumiez, and Lucky Brand Jeans, among other companies.

In 2010, the company partnered with Filson, an outdoor goods manufacturer in Seattle, to produce a high-end line of jackets and workwear.

In 2011, the firm hired Chip Bergh as the president and chief executive of the brand. In that same year, it established more than 20 different waterless manufacturing techniques, reducing the exceptionally high amounts of water used to create denim. Levi's is now the world's most sustainable brand of jeans in terms of water usage.

On May 8, 2013, the NFL's San Francisco 49ers announced that Levi Strauss & Co. had purchased the naming rights to its new stadium in Santa Clara, California. The naming rights deal called for Levi's to pay $220.3 million to the city of Santa Clara and the 49ers over 20 years, with an option to extend the agreement for another five years for around $75 million.

On July 13, 2017, Levi Strauss heir Bill Goldman died in a private plane crash near Sonoma, California.

In 2017, Levi Strauss & Co. released a "smart jacket", an apparel it developed in partnership with Google. After two years of collaboration, the result was a denim jacket set at $350.

In March 2019, Levi's debuted on the New York Stock Exchange under the ticker "LEVI". Levi Strauss was valued at $6.6 billion, with its IPO priced above the target. The first hemp jeans from Levi's were manufactured in March 2019.

In September 2019, Levi's won a final judgment on a trademark infringement in Guangzhou, China. The case centered on the "arcuate design on two pockets at the back of jeans", which has been protected in China since its registration there in 2005. The company won damages and costs in addition to a ban on future infringements. The infringer's ignorance of the trademark was no bar to punishment.

In 2019, Levi's became one of only two major clothing companies with commitments in line with the Paris Agreement's goal of limiting global average temperature increase to 1.5 degrees Celsius.

In 2020, Levi Strauss & Co. was expected to have completely replaced chemical usage as well as using lasers to cut, and design ripped parts of jeans. In December 2019, the Engage for Good (formerly Cause Marketing Forum) organization awarded the company the Golden Halo Award for 2020 for its advancements in corporate social impact.

On August 5, 2021, Levi Strauss & Co. announced the acquisition of Beyond Yoga, entering the activewear market. It was announced senior executives are to speak with AI expert Blake Van Leer at the LA eCommerce Summit about its digital strategies and AI in 2023. In January 2023, Levi began accepting old pairs of jeans to recycle into more denim in a campaign to go green. Levi's Autumn/Winter 2023 WellThread capsule aimed to show the brand's engagement to sustainability as it included items made from 100% transitional cotton as well as plant-based natural dyes.

== Cultural impact ==
Levi's have been worn by people of all backgrounds – from miners to actors to Nobel Prize recipients. Marlon Brando and Albert Einstein wore Levi's, and Einstein wore a 1930s-era Levi's leather jacket, which sold at auction house Christie's in July 2016 for £110,500.

Levi's is aggressive in advertising, marketing, and trademark protection. It has used its signature arched stitching on the back pockets of its jeans since 1873. In 1943, the firm trademarked the design in the U.S. and has done so in more than 100 total jurisdictions as of 2019. It has also trademarked various word marks, including "Levi's", "Red Tab", "Orange Tab", "Silvertab", "501", "505", "517", "550", "569", and "Dockers".

During the Cold War, Levi's became a symbol of the west in the Soviet Union. According to historian Kristin Roth-Ey, the association stemmed from the 1957 World Festival of Youth and Students in Moscow: Americans wore Levi's jeans to the event, resulting in widespread interest within the Russian Soviet Federative Socialist Republic that prompted the Soviet government to condemn the brand as a symbol of western decadence. Continued demand for the jeans resulted in both genuine articles and bootlegs becoming commonplace in Soviet black markets, and in 1979, the Soviet government struck deals with Levi's and the VF Corporation to manufacture jeans for consumers in the region; however, this deal fell through due to the 1980 Summer Olympics boycott following the onset of the Soviet–Afghan War.

In 2021, Levi's launched the "Buy Better, Wear Longer" campaign which aimed to target the problem of clothing overconsumption and increasing amount of textile waste in landfills globally.

In 2022, it was reported that a pair of Levi's jeans from the 1880s found in an abandoned mine shaft was sold for $87,400 at an auction in New Mexico. The vintage Levi's bore a label with the inscription "the only kind made by white labor", a detail which helped date the jeans to the period between 1882, which was after the U.S. Congress passed the Chinese Exclusion Act, banning Chinese laborers seeking to immigrate to the U.S., and the 1890s, when the company "reversed [its] policy".

== Corporate structure and staff ==
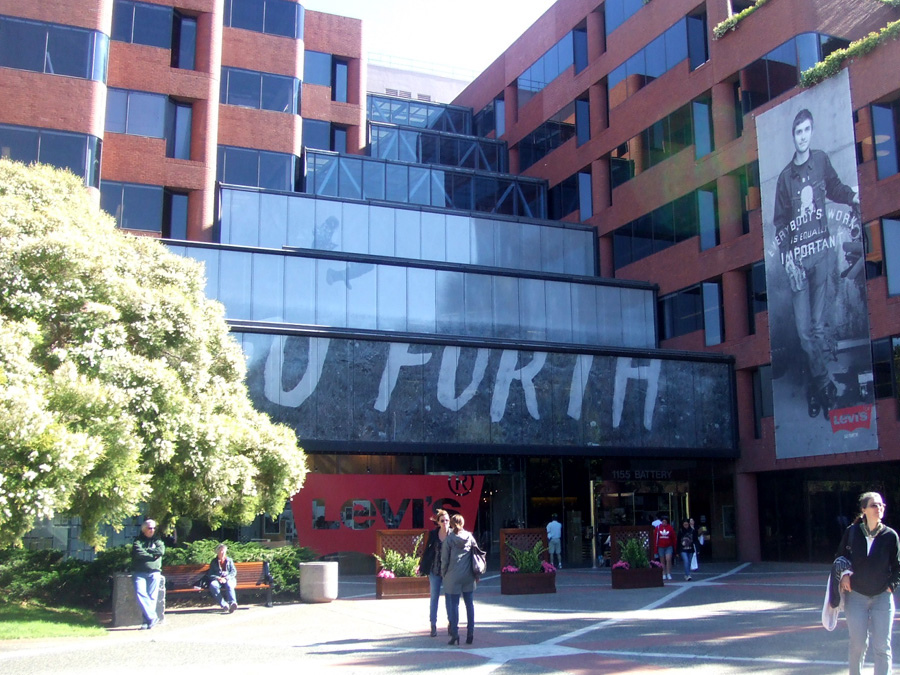
Levi's Plaza in San Francisco, the location of the company's corporate headquarters

Levi Strauss & Co. is a worldwide corporation organized into three geographic divisions: Levi Strauss Americas (LSA), which is headquartered in San Francisco; Levi Strauss Europe (LSE), which is based in Brussels; and Levi Strauss Asia Pacific, Middle East and Africa.

Strauss passed the company to his nephews, Jacob, Sigmund, Louis and Abraham, the four surviving sons of David Stern, upon his death in 1902. Walter A. Haas, who married Elise Stern, the daughter of David's son, Sigmund Stern, became president in 1928, and the company remained under the ownership of the Stern–Haas family until first going public in 1971. However, in 1985, the Haas family recaptured ownership of the company, taking it private once again for the next 34 years. In February 2019, the company filed with the U.S. Securities and Exchange Commission for an initial public offering to be traded on the New York Stock Exchange under the ticker symbol LEVI. It was held on March 21, 2019, selling for $17 per share.

The company is also well known for promoting progressive causes. It was one of the earliest private sector institutions to support LGBTQ causes and, during the 2016 presidential campaign, donated $1 million to support immigration and LGBTQ rights. In 2018, CEO Chip Bergh published an op-ed in Fortune magazine, speaking out against gun violence.

However, the company is alleged to make use of Uyghur forced labor provided by the China-based supplier Beijing Guanghua Textile Group from a report by the Helena Kennedy Center for International Justice, the socialists and democrats in the European Parliament. Levi's has disputed these claims.

In the first few months of the COVID-19 pandemic, due to a $364 million loss, 700 office jobs were pared to reduce expenses by $100 million.

== Current products ==
As of 2019, Levi's are made in many developing countries, including Bangladesh, India, Egypt, Lesotho, Sri Lanka, Vietnam, Indonesia, and Mexico. Some top-end styles in the "Levi's Premium" and "Levi's Vintage Clothing" lines are produced in the United States.

In addition to jeans, Levi's sells a full line of shirts, jackets, sweaters, underwear, socks, eyeglasses, accessories, dresses, skirts, and leather products. All jeans and pants are categorized by fit – skinny, slim, straight, bootcut, taper, relaxed, flare, and "big & tall" – identified by trademarked three-digit numbers. The 501, the company's original modern design, is available in styles for both men and women. The rest of the 500 series is designed for men, and the 300, 400, 700, and 800 series for women.

== FIFA World Cup ==
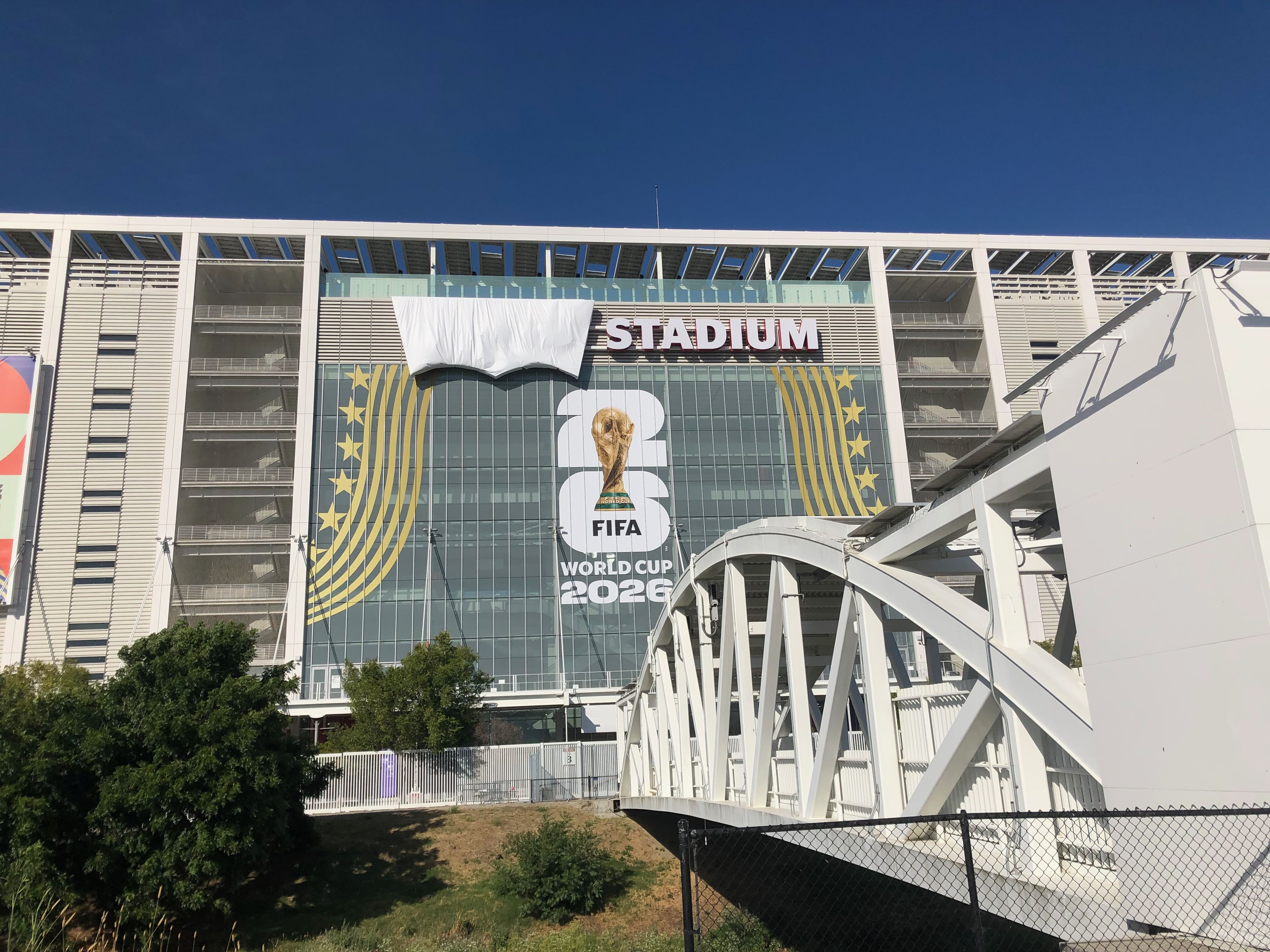
Levi's Stadium temporarily rebranded as "San Francisco Bay Area Stadium" during the 2026 FIFA World Cup in accordance with FIFA sponsorship regulations.

In June 2026, during the 2026 FIFA World Cup, FIFA required non-sponsor corporate branding to be removed from host stadiums. As a result, Levi's Stadium was temporarily renamed "San Francisco Bay Area Stadium" and its Levi's branding was covered. Levi Strauss & Co. responded by incorporating the obscured logo into a social media marketing campaign, using the situation as a branding opportunity.

Following the rebranding of World Cup venues, Levi Strauss & Co. temporarily changed its profile image on social media to resemble the covered logo displayed at Levi's Stadium. The change drew media attention as part of the company's response to FIFA's sponsorship and branding regulations for tournament venues.

== Gallery ==
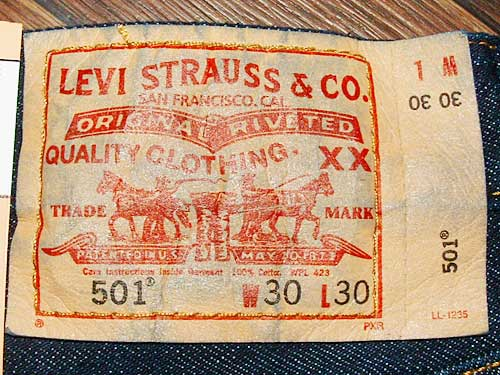
Tag from a pair of Levi 501 button-fly jeans

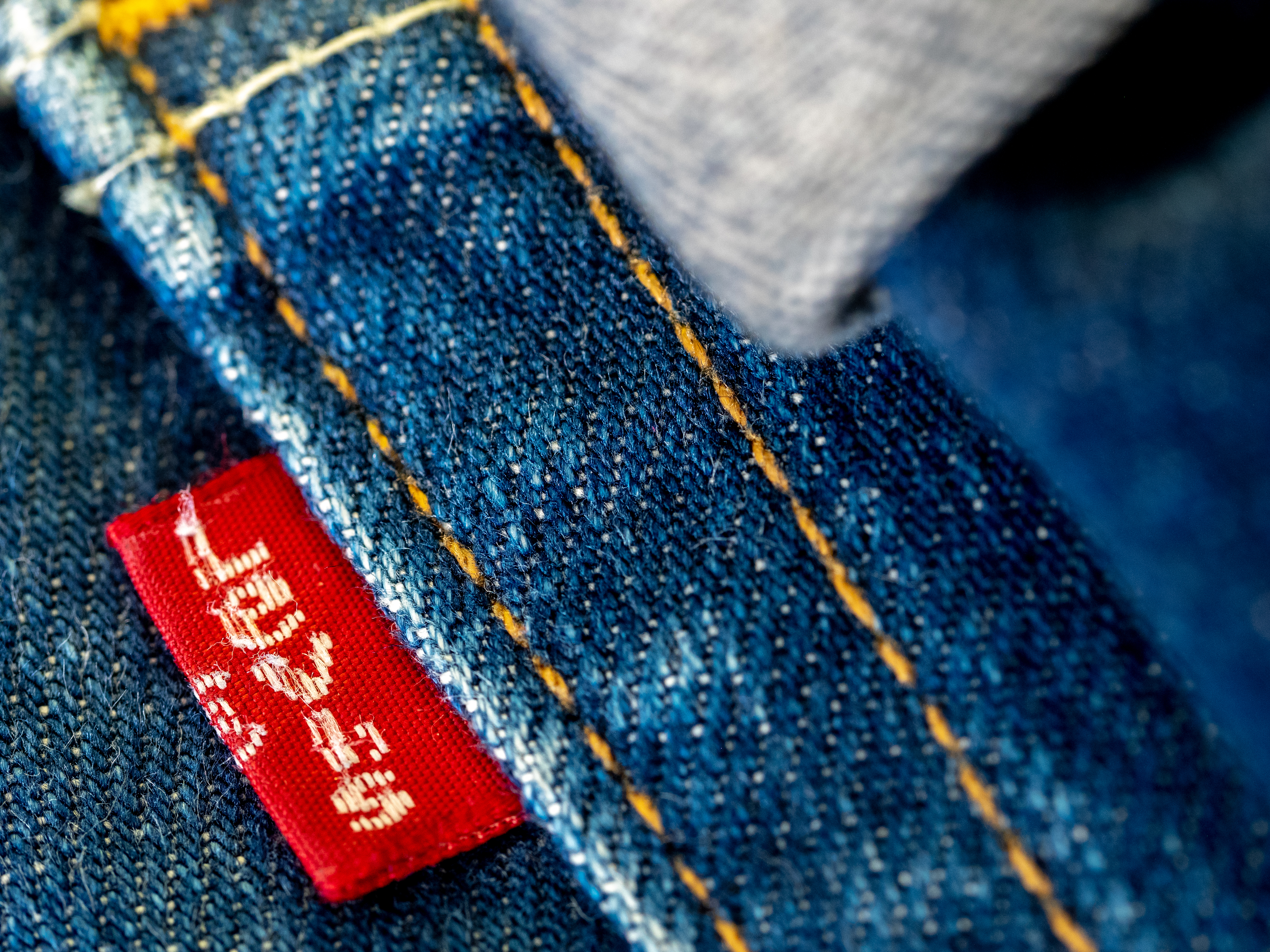
Detail of the back of a pair of Levi jeans

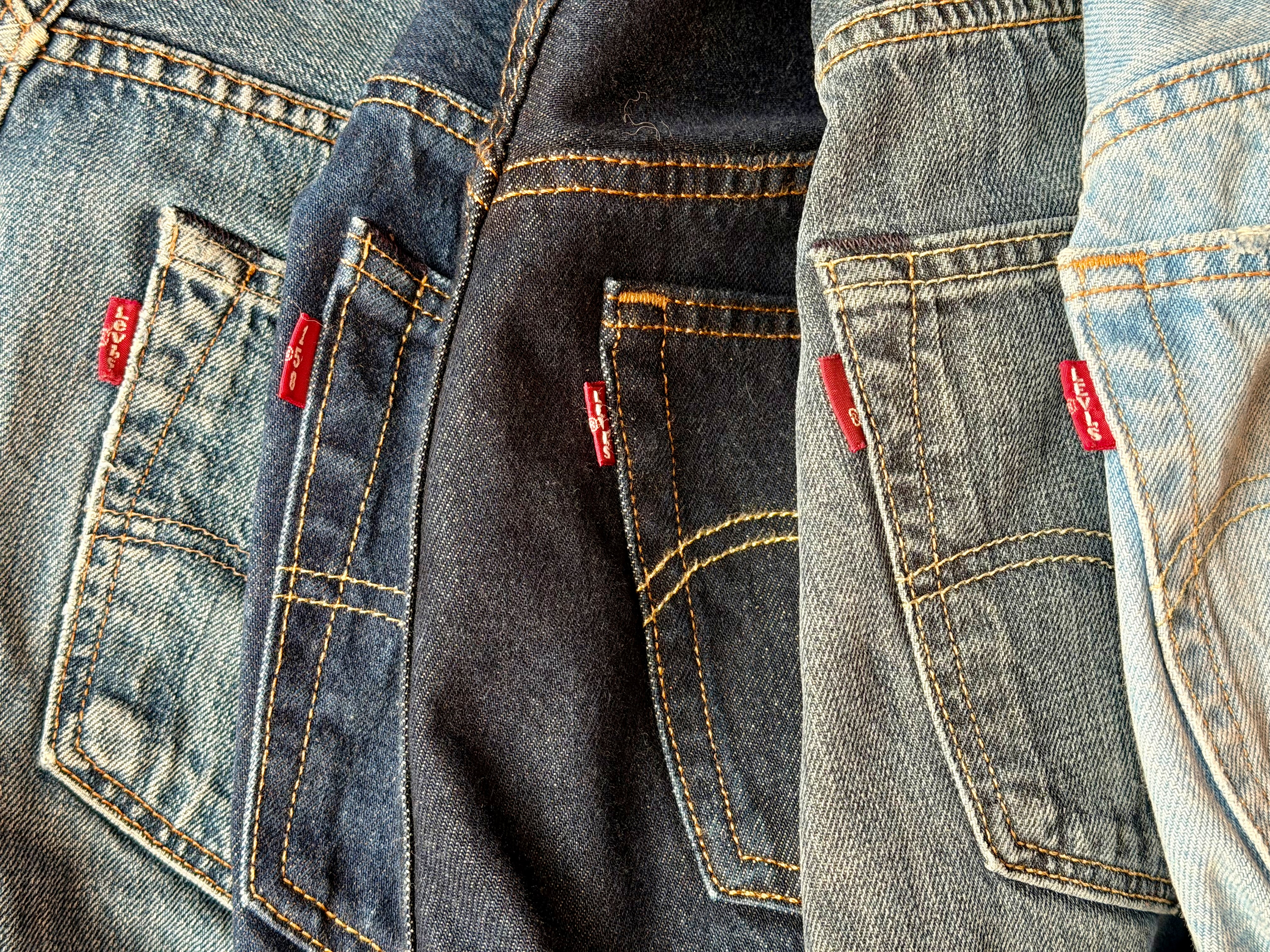
Levi's 501 Red Tab variants

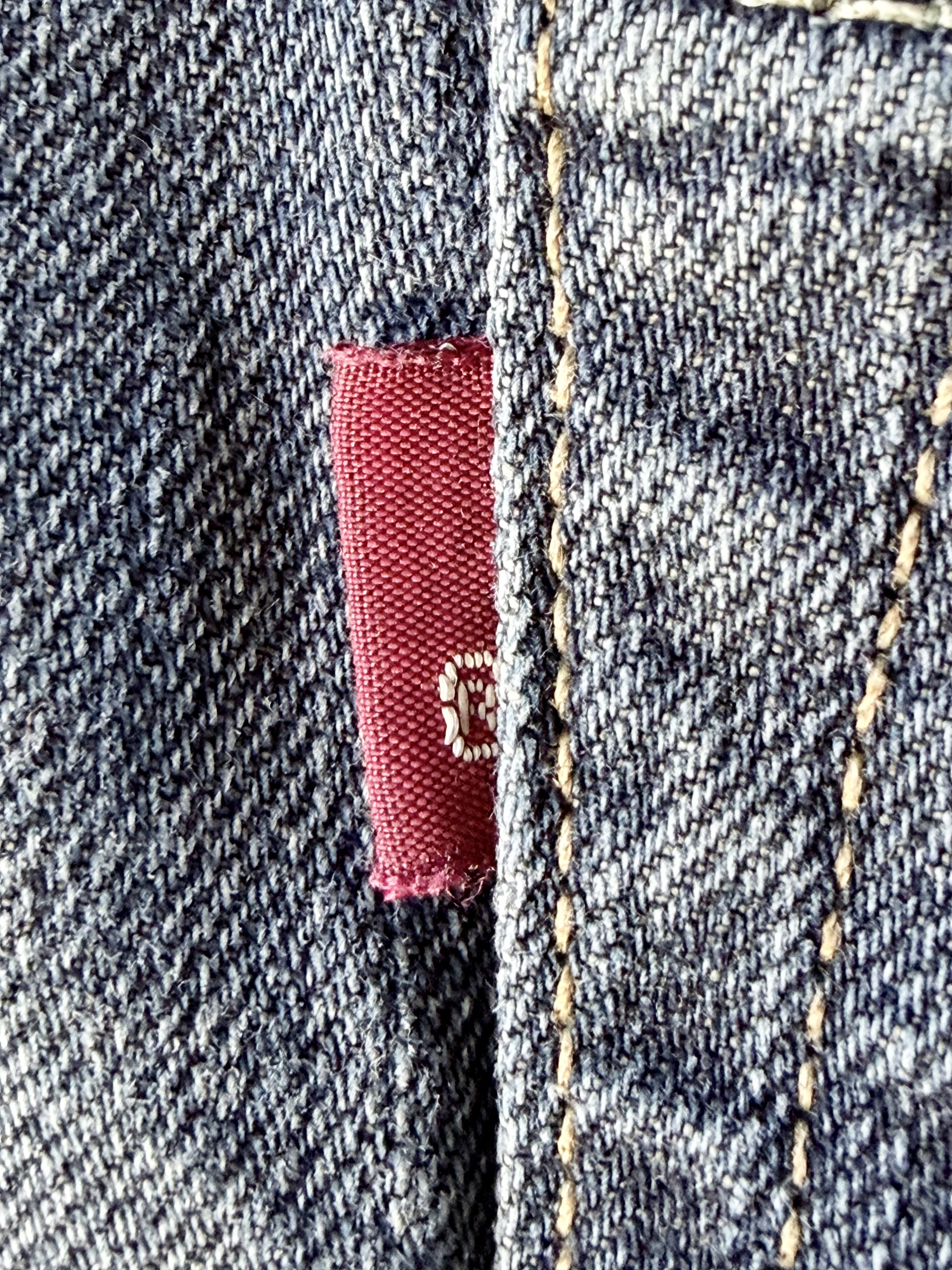
'Blank tab' on a pair of Levi's 501 jeans

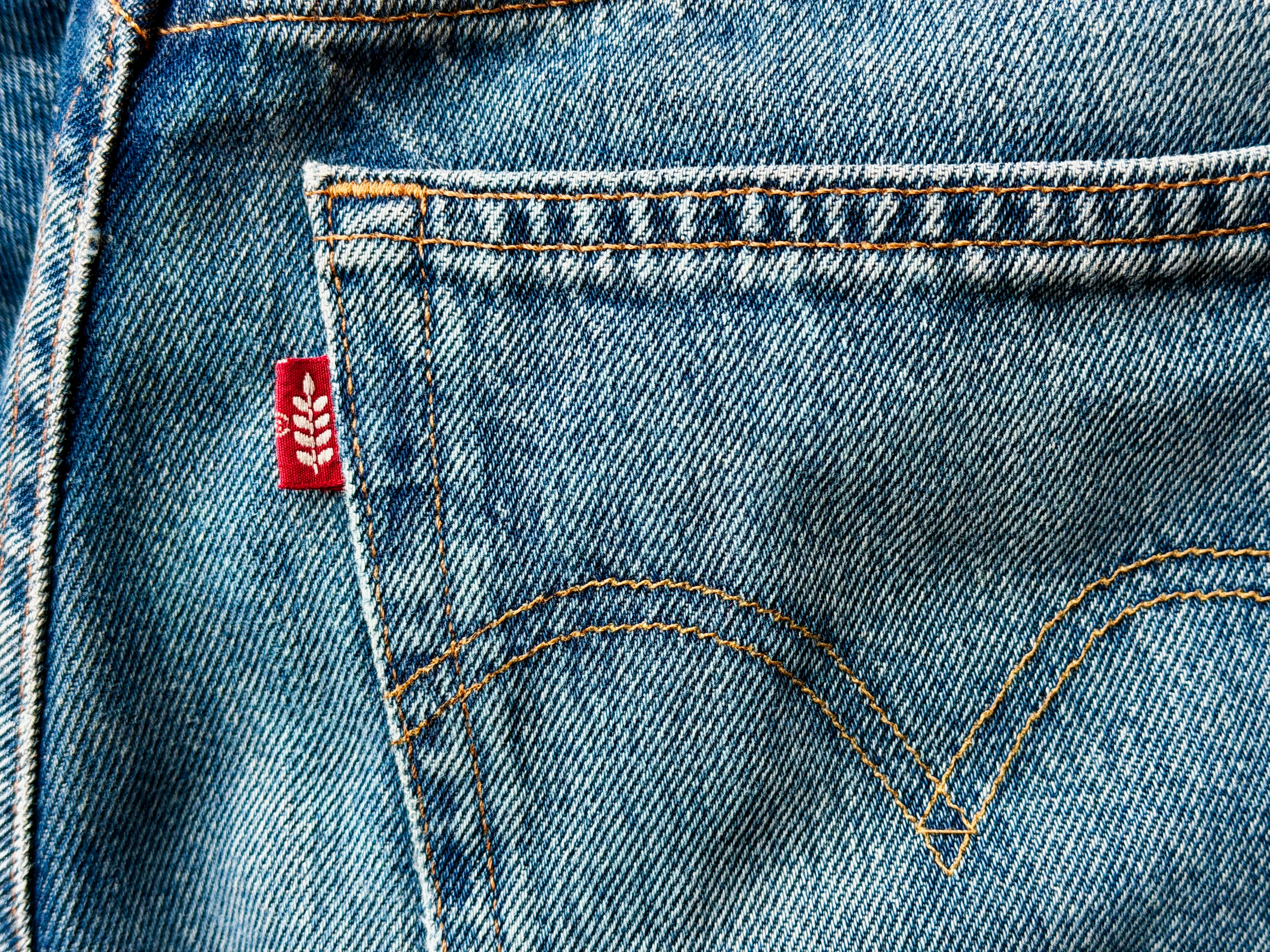
'Plant-Based' Red Tab

== See also ==
- Jean jacket
