= Ohtli Award =

Award granted by the government of Mexico

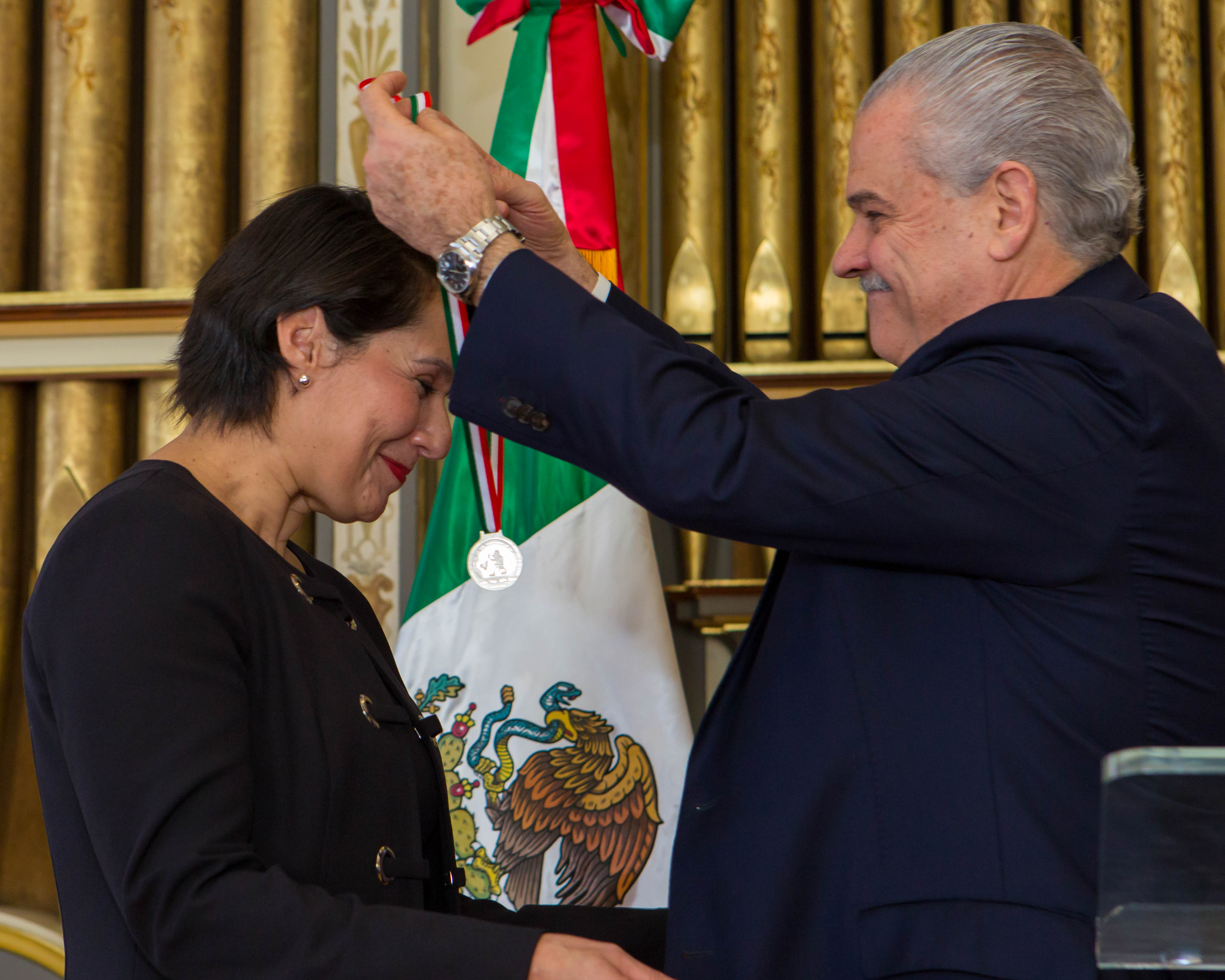
Ana Recio Harvey receives the Ohtli Award in 2015.

The Ohtli Award or Reconocimiento Ohtli is granted by the Institute of Mexicans Living Abroad (IME, by its acronym in Spanish) from the Mexican Ministry of Foreign Affairs, and its purpose is to strengthen relations with the Mexican diaspora.

== About ==
The Ohtli award is administered by the Secretariat of Foreign Affairs. It is given once annually by the embassies and consists of a medallion, silver rosette and a diploma.

The name of the award comes from the Nahuatl word which means "road" or "path." The medal depicts an Aztec god cutting grass with a machete. The symbolism of the name alludes to the idea of opening a path for others.

The first award was given out in 1996. The award is one of the highest honors given to citizens living outside of Mexico. The Ohtli Award recognizes individuals who have aided, empowered or positively affected the lives of Mexican nationals that reside abroad.

Between 1996 and 2016 the award was given to 601 individuals and organizations.

== Notable recipients ==
Notable recipients are:

- Alfredo Arreguín (1995)
- Edward R. Roybal (1996)
- Carlos Truan (1996)
- Hector P. Garcia (1996)
- Gonzalo Barrientos (1996)
- Cruz Reynoso (1997)
- Ella Ochoa (1997)
- Dionicio Morales (1997)
- Mario G. Obledo (1997)
- Jaime Soto (1997)
- Nicolás Leoz (1997)
- Guadalupe Reyes (1998)
- Pete Rodriguez (1998)
- Dolores Huerta (1998)
- Burton E. Grossman (1998)
- Deborah V. Ortiz (1999)
- Filemon Vela Sr. (2000)
- Juliet V. Garcia (2000)
- Kika de la Garza (2000)
- Columba Bush (2000)
- Amanda Aguirre (2000)
- Joan Sebastian (2001)
- Cecilia Muñoz (2001)
- Enrique Moreno (2001)
- Carlos Cortez (2001)
- Raúl Héctor Castro (2001)
- Marco Antonio Firebaugh (2001)
- Richard Joel Noriega (2002)
- Rosa Ramirez Guerrero (2002)
- Blanca Vela (2002)
- Judith Valles (2003)
- Patricia Madrid (2003)
- Marco A. López Jr. (2003)
- Bob Menedez (2004)
- Nancy "Rusty" Barceló (2004)
- Ruben Barrales (2005)
- Blanca Alvarado (2005)
- Marylou Olivarez Mason (2005)
- Jared Polis (2006)
- Ed Pastor (2006)
- Ignacio E. Lozano, Jr. (2006)
- Buddy Garcia (2006)
- Pete Gallego (2006)
- Gerald Richard Barnes (2007)
- José Cisneros (2007)
- Luz Maria Frias (2007)
- Patricia Torres-Ray (2008)
- Monica C. Lozano (2008)
- David Coss (2008)
- Eliseo Medina (2008)
- Pablo A. Martinez (2008)
- Janet Murguía (2009)
- Enrique Morones (2009)
- Gloria Molina (2009)
- Gil Cedillo (2009)
- Esperanza Andrade (2009)
- Jimmie V. Reyna (2009)
- Viola Casares (2009)
- Ben Hueso (2010)
- Rosa Rosales (2010)
- Antonio Villaraigosa (2010)
- Olga Talamante (2010)
- Hilda Solis (2010)
- Polly Baca (2010)
- Joaquin Avila (2011)
- Philip Brunelle (2011)
- Rafael Anchia (2011)
- Juan Carlos Escamilla (2011)
- Bill Richardson (2011)
- Sylvia Acevedo (2011)
- Edward James Olmos (2012)
- Alfredo Quiñones-Hinojosa (2012)
- Richard A. Tapia (2012)
- David J. Schmidly (2012)
- Mel Martínez (2012)
- Paddy Moloney (2012)
- Francisco G. Cigarroa (2012)
- Salud Carbajal (2012)
- Carlos Gutierrez (2012)
- Charlie Gonzalez (2012)
- Alexander Gonzalez (2012)
- José M. Hernández (2013)
- Lincoln Díaz-Balart (2013)
- Jesús "Chuy" García (2013)
- Henry Cisneros (2013)
- Alberto M. Carvalho (2013)
- Iliana de la Vega (a 014)
- Jonathan Rothschild (2014)
- Fernando Valenzuela (2014)
- Alma Flor Ada (2014)
- Denise Moreno Ducheny (2014)
- Hispanic Heritage Foundation (2014)
- Bismarck Lepe (2014)
- Antonio Olmos (2015)
- Spencer MacCallum (2015)
- Melanie Maczka (2015)
- Eva Longoria (2015)
- José Huizar (2015)
- Ana Recio Harvey (2015)
- Raúl Grijalva (2015)
- Maria Elena Durazo (2015)
- Suzy Castor (2015)
- Valentina Alazraki (2015)
- John D. Trasviña (2015)
- Hector Ruiz (2015)
- Gabriela Teissier (2016)
- Josefina Villamil Tinajero (2016)
- Carlos del Rio (2016)
- L. Whitney Clayton (2016)
- Julian Castro (2016)
- Teresa Alonso-Rasgado (2016)
- Marco A. Robles (2017)
- José Miguel Lemus (2018)
- Veronica Serrato (2018)
- Patricio Ibarguengoitia Franzoni (2020)
- Norma Chávez-Peterson (2021)
- Ivan Segura Olmos (2021)
- Judge Emily E. Vasquez (2022)
- Lidia Riveros Chávez (2022)
- Revista Latina (2022)
- Richard Debler (2023)
- Roberto Kugler Osorio (2024)
- Pritam Singh (2024)
- María Eugenia “Tiki” Larios (2024)
- Missionary Clarisses (2024)
- Justin Brooks (2024)
