= Southwest Workers Union =

US grassroots community organizing group

Southwest Workers Union (SWU), previously Southwest Public Workers Union (SPWU), is a grassroots nonprofit community organizing group in the United States with over 3,000 members who have been working for 30 years to combat environmental racism and worker injustice. Their goal is to organize "low-income workers and families, community residents, and youth, united in one organizational struggle for worker rights, environmental justice and community empowerment." SWU does this through educating and strengthening community leaders and emphasizing direct action on issues that impact these communities.

SWU uses community engagement to promote positive change through community education and information transparency in San Antonio, Texas, and the surrounding area. SWU's areas of focus are environmental and social issues to perpetuate "a community-labor strategy that takes on the many faces of injustice that impact working -class and poor families in South Texas." Additionally, SWU participates in international organization events, such as the Border Social Forum, as well as other national social justice work.

== History ==
The SWU was founded in 1988 in Hondo, Texas in the effort to combat environmental racism through community focused activism. The founding members of the union have worked closely with residents, local schools, working class citizens and local politicians to address the disproportionate environmental effects from the nearby air force base as well as other pollutant contributors in the area, such as the Union Pacific Railroad and Port San Antonio. SWU formed the Committee of Environmental Justice Action in 1994 and highlighted the impact of the air force base, which led to the contamination of local water sources, and as a result impaired the health of the residents. Various other grassroots organizations, including the Hondo Empowerment Committee, the Youth Leadership Organization, and Climate Collectiva, have also worked with the SWU to help build leadership with Mexican and Mexican-American working class citizens. For over 30 years, SWU has grown with various projects to ensure a safe space for residents to live, work, and grow, like community urban gardens (Roots of Change Community Garden) and advocating for workers' fair wages through campaigns such as the Living Wage Campaign, which engages with local and national policies to ensure better conditions for low-wage workers.

== Environmental justice ==
=== Kelly Air Force Base ===
Kelly Air Force Base, now known as Kelly Field Annex, was established during World War I and used as an air force training camp and general flying depot. The base is located in San Antonio, Texas, with a predominantly Hispanic population. It is currently used as an aircraft maintenance facility and houses many aircraft, jet engines, and other military machines.

In 1983, the community found that the base had been dumping waste into an open pit for 13 years. This included benzene, chlorobenzene, perchloroethylene, and trichloroethylene, which are all known carcinogens. in 1993, The SWU came to Kelly to assist the North Kelly Garden Committee organize and educate community members on health and safety impacts. The EPA put a red flag on the facility and made it a top priority to clean up. The base initially denied off-site dumping or contamination. The Southwest Workers Union filed a civil complaint alleging racial discrimination against Kelly Air Force Base, Greater Kelly Development Corporation, the City of San Antonio, Texas Natural Resource Conservation Commission, the Agency for Toxic Substances and Disease Registry, and the Region VI of the Environmental Protection Agency on the grounds of:

1) The exclusion of members of the Restoration Advisory Board and the general public from meetings of the Base Closure Team; 2) Plans for rapid industrial redevelopment of the base without adequately considering impacts on surrounding communities; 3) Delays in the release of the Public Health Assessment of KAFB; 4) The decision to not list KAFB as a superfund site; 5) A failure to release public information; 6) Decisions which indicate that only on-site (and no off-site) contamination will be cleaned-up; 7) The failure of the City to inform persons buying federally subsidized affordable homes of the presence of soil and groundwater contamination; and 8) The failure of TNRCC to take any enforcement action against KAFB.

The base was closed in April 2001 and renamed to Kelly Field Annex. As of 1999, the Air Force had spent over $320 million to date in the clean-up of Kelly.

=== Climate resilience ===
In effort to address the disproportionate effects of climate change on immigrants and communities of color, SWU advocates for green energy and career pathways for local residents affected by big energy businesses. Their work coincides with Climate Collectiva through strategic partnerships, along with Our Power, to push for public energy efficiency and transition from conventional fossil fuel energy. SWU led the fight to divert $20 million from nuclear energy towards renewable and efficient energy sources.

In collaboration with University of North Carolina Chapel Hill, SWU have expressed their concerns through a fact sheet report on the current climate crisis. The report emphasizes the vulnerabilities, assets, and opportunities of various environmental justice factors.

=== Eagle Ford region ===
The Eagle Ford Play is a sedimentary rock formation that stretches over much of Texas. Eagle Ford was once one of the most active shale plays in the world, with 200 rigs running in January 2015. Due to this use, third-party groups have expressed concern over the health impacts on locals.

In 2013 SWU, Centro por la Justicia and local residents organized meetings to discuss their concerns over fracking in Eagle Ford Shale. Additionally, SWU, Centro Por La Justicia and the University of North Carolina Chapel Hill released a report in 2015 in which they describe "the consequences of the climate crisis, present current challenges in light of environmental and economic justice, describe current programs related to climate resiliency, and offers insight into future directions". These efforts led to the publication of a study in 2016, which found that hydraulic-fracturing fluids and wastewater from the Eagle Ford Shale contained hundreds of substances with the potential to contaminate drinking water of local residents. The study also demonstrated that these issues disproportionately affect people of color and people living in poverty.

Due to the decline of crude oil prices, the number of active rigs has dropped to 87 as of March 2018.

=== Union Pacific ===
Union Pacific is a train company based in the area of San Antonio, Texas. Between 2004 and 2007 there were 21 major derailments, which resulted in six deaths and multiple hospitalizations. One of these crashes led to the release of chlorine gas and anhydrous ammonia near San Antonio. The released chlorine gas and anhydrous ammonia fanned out to a 10-mile radius which resulted in the hospitalization of over 50 people.

SWU was concerned with these accidents, as well as the railway's proximity to schools and families. SWU believes that residents of San Antonio should not be subjugated to any hazardous materials and operations. To try to prevent future accidents, SWU launched Southtown Organizing Project (STOP). Members of SWU attended hall meetings and congressional hearings on railroad safety in order to ensure STOP was successful and the people around the Union Pacific rails were represented. SWU also organized protests in coalition with the Committee for Environmental Justice Action in which they called for the creation of an emergency evacuation plan for those living near tracks, as well as full disclosure of the cargo of the trains.

=== Keystone XL pipeline ===
The Southwest Workers Union is against the Keystone XL pipeline that was proposed in 2012 by TransCanada. The pipeline participates in the life cycle of greenhouse gas emissions. Large amounts of water and natural gas are required during the mining process, which can contaminate the surrounding water sources for local communities. The EPA suggested they look for alternative or mitigative processes to help combat those emissions. A lot of the land in the region is used to create and hold the pipeline. 95% of the land used is privately owned. There were also visible oil spills in the area.

The Southwest Workers Union does not want any of those potential consequences to affect anyone. The SWU was concerned with the health effects of the new infrastructure. They organized a rally, created a health survey, and presented those results on their website for the public.

The U.S. State Department has the role of approving or disapproving the pipeline, in the nation's best interest. That includes economically and environmentally. Their definition and the SWU definition of "environmentally safe" are different, which is why SWU opposes the pipeline. The U.S. State Department created an environmental assessment that predicted potential risks of the pipeline. The SWU argued that while the State Department stated possible environmental risks, they did not focus on the effect on the people living in the communities near the pipeline and associated roadways and facilities. The SWU argued that communities of color are wrongfully harmed due to their proximity to those places.

== Workers' rights ==
=== Living wage campaign ===
Workers in school districts in San Antonio, Texas, launched a living wage campaign with the aid of Southwest Workers Union. The San Antonio Alliance of Teachers, and support personnel and other community organizers, like SWU, asked the school board to support the campaign and look into raising the minimum wage to $13 per hour for 2017, and to $15 per hour by 2019. The SWU organized the employees at Edgewood and South San Independent School District meetings in February 2016 to ask their districts for a raise in wages as well. This campaign is still in progress.

== Community organizing ==
=== University Sin Fronteras / University Without Borders ===
SWU was one of the founding members of the Universidad Sin Fronteras (UNSIF) between 2010 and 2012. SWU and Project South: Institute for the Elimination of Poverty and Genocide were the two organizations used to anchor this newly formed educational organization because of their years of community organizing experience. UNSIF aims to "share knowledge among individuals who can make liberation a basic goal of their social movement."

SWU maintains one of the satellite campuses in San Antonio. This campus' mission is to work to "decolonize the borderlands" between Texas and Mexico, in an attempt to combat racial and socioeconomic inequalities and injustice. Through the UNSIF campus, SWU attempts to educate and organize community members around the complex issues of political, economic, and border issues in the community.

=== South by Southwest Experiment ===
The South by Southwest Experiment (SxSWE) was an initiative designed and executed by community organizing groups from the Southern and Southwestern United States. These organizations included members from Southern Echo, Southwest Organizing Project, and Southwest Workers Union.

These groups first came together after Hurricane Katrina in an effort to provide aid and assistance to the Indigenous and African American communities impacted by the storm. SWU and the other groups developed the SxSWE which aimed to address issues of the:

"promotion of accountable governance, organizing to ensure complete census counts, enabling communities to engage in redistricting efforts, developing a grassroots living curriculum, and strengthening youth leadership and sharing of intergenerational practice characteristic of each organization."

SWU and the SxSWE have had success in organizing their community members by emphasizing the importance of education through their "intentional process" to overcome obstacles in grassroots movements.

=== San Antonio environmental justice bus ===
In 1996 the Southwest Workers Union, known then as Southwest Public Workers Union, coordinated a bus tour for community members and members of the Environmental Protection Agency, National Environmental Justice Advisory Council (NEJAC) subcommittee. This event was an attempt to activate community engagement and government accountability in Southwest Texas.

The tour traveled around Southern Texas highlighting key polluting facilities. Members of the SWU and community members educated government officials on issues of environmental racism, lack of government regulation enforcement, and the significance of strengthening the environmental justice movement. This tour provided SWU an opportunity to share skills and techniques to respond to and combat environmental injustices.

NEJAC have continued their work with SWU in their role as an independent advisory committee on issues of environmental justice to the EPA.
