= List of journalists and media workers killed in Mexico =

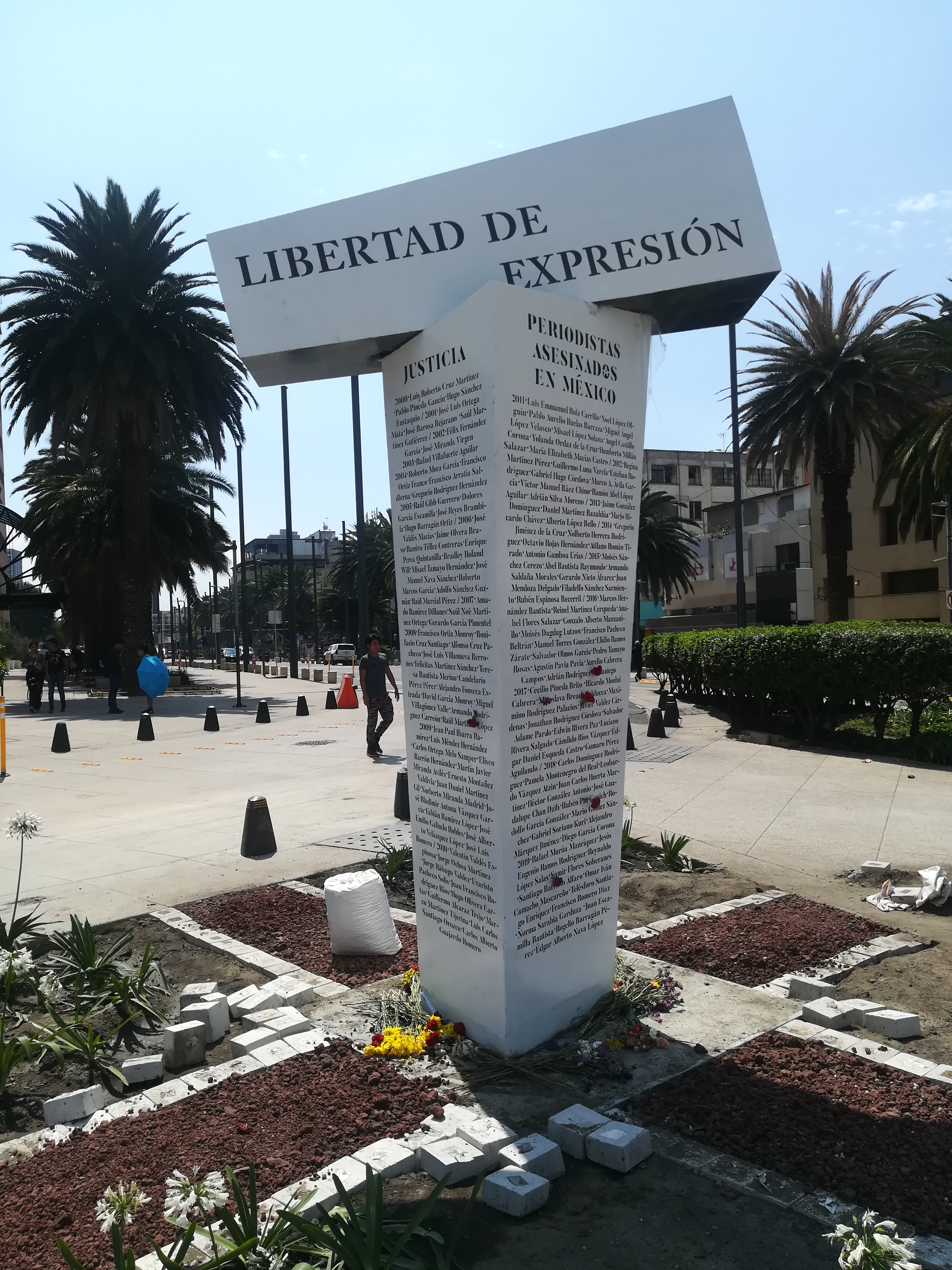
Aquí Nadie Olvida, an anti-monument memorial in Mexico City bearing the names of dozens of journalists killed or disappeared in Mexico

Mexico is one of the most dangerous countries in the world for journalists and among the ones with the highest levels of unsolved crimes against the press. Though the exact figures of those killed are often conflicting, press freedom organizations around the world agree through general consensus that Mexico is among the most dangerous countries on the planet to exercise journalism as a profession. More than 100 media workers have been killed or disappeared since 2000, and most of these crimes remained unsolved, improperly investigated, and with few perpetrators arrested and convicted.

== Historical summary ==
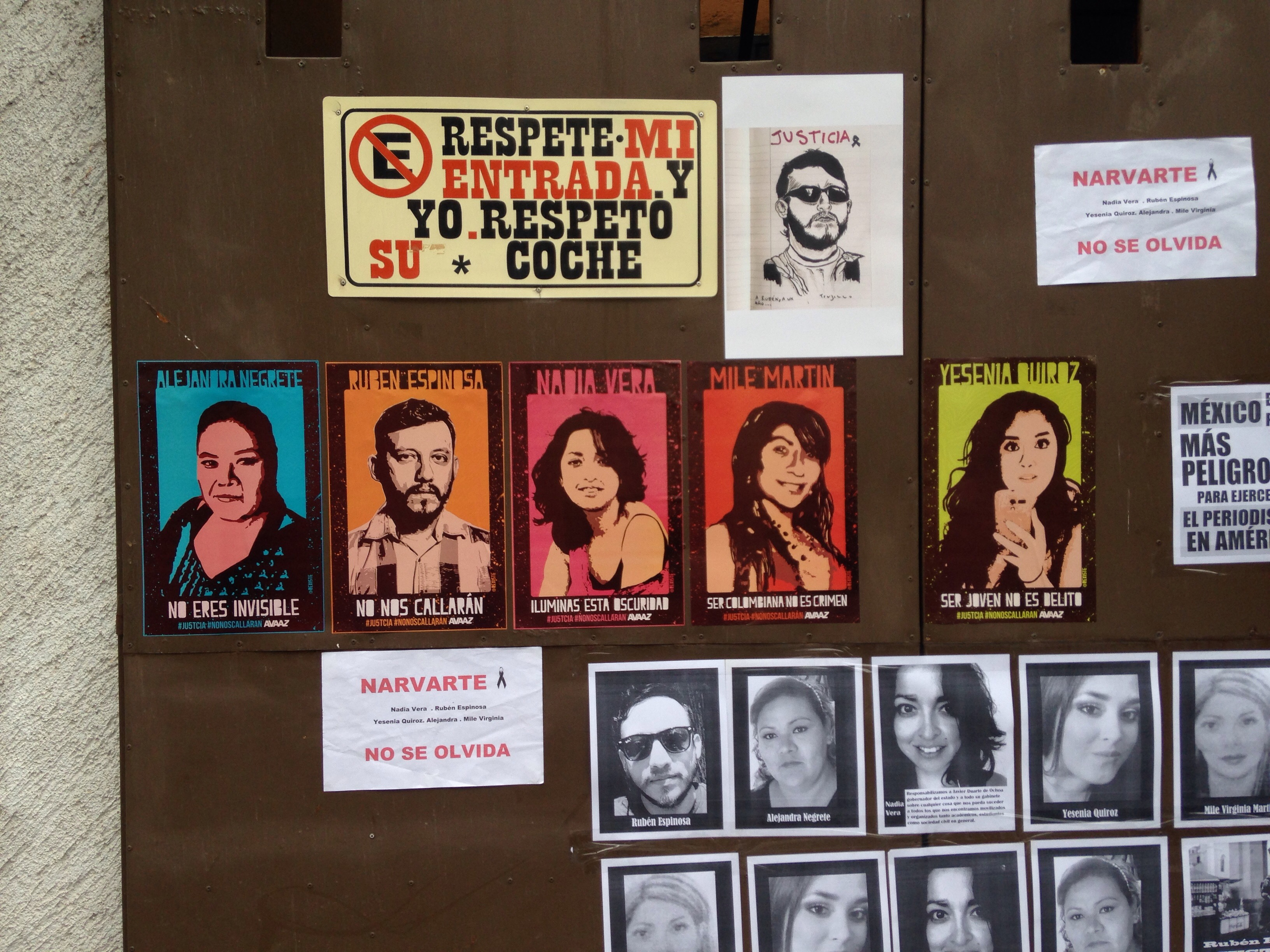
Mexican journalist Rubén Espinosa was murdered, along with four women, in Mexico City after fleeing death threats in Veracruz.

Targeted killings of journalists in Mexico have existed since the reign of Porfirio Díaz and the Mexican Revolution in 1910. When the Institutional Revolutionary Party (PRI) ruled the presidency in the 1930s following the Revolution, the Mexican government practically monopolized the press in Mexico in order to get favorable coverage in the media. Journalists who complied with the modus operandi were paid with government handouts and gifts; those who did not were intimidated and/or killed. Throughout the 1970s and the 1980s, Mexico was the most dangerous country for journalists in all of Latin America. However, most of the attacks against the press were carried out by upset drug traffickers and corrupt law enforcement officials because they were the ones mentioned in the press.

Through the government's use of informal coercion and media blackout, the Mexican press became accustomed to limit their reports to what state officials said. Very few journalists dared to break away from this practice because the government would thereby threaten to withdraw their advertisements and prevent the state-owned paper agency of that time to sell newsprints for their publications.

When the Mexican government began to sell off the media public enterprises in the 1980s, more autonomous and independent newspapers with diversity in their news coverages were born. During this decade, the PRI began to lose several local and state elections, and eventually lost the presidency in 2000 to the National Action Party (PAN), after they had won every presidential election since 1929. With this political transition, Mexican readers began to prefer media outlets that showed a level of integrity and autonomy.

When former President Felipe Calderón of the PAN took office in 2006, he carried out a military-led campaign to tackle Mexico's drug trafficking organizations. Violence across Mexico spread shortly thereafter, as rival organized crime groups fought for territorial control and with the government. This rise in drug-related murders came alongside a spike of attacks against the press, with drug cartels and corrupt officials wanting to take control the flow of information that reached the news. Organized crime groups traditionally attack traditional print newspapers, either by killing, disappearing, or intimidating their reporters.

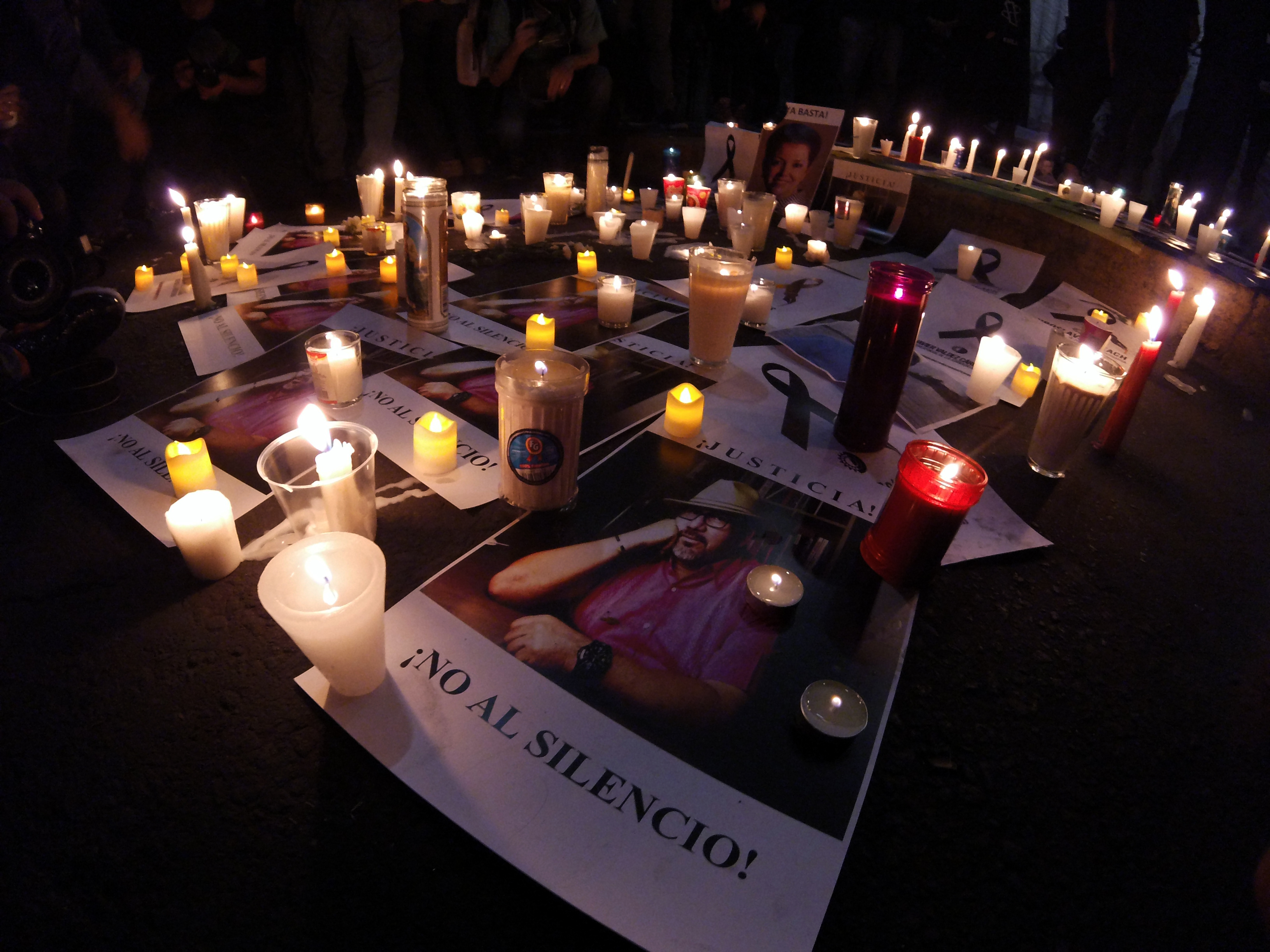
Award-winning Mexican journalist Javier Valdez Cárdenas was murdered on 15 May 2017

With traditional media being too intimidating to reporters, some newspapers in Mexico have self-censored and stopped writing about drug trafficking and organized crime. Others simply limit their coverage to the information found in official government press releases or police reports, while others, however, are forced to write what a drug trafficking organization orders them to publish. Journalists have to be careful when they decide to write about the drug violence in Mexico because little things can incur a reprisal; using simple words like "organized crime" are often just what they need to anger a drug trafficking organization.

Criminal organizations target journalists for various reasons. Among the most common one is to silence the press in the areas they operate in, and especially when the groups are trying to establish their presence in an area. They also kill journalists as retributions for publications that may damage their business. Cartels want the press to be silent because keeping an image that a city is safe can prevent the Mexican government from sending more federal troops to the area. In addition, Mexican media outlets find themselves vulnerable to attacks when they are in an area with two or more organized crime groups. A group might threaten to kill a journalist if there is coverage of them on the media, while another group might do the same if there is not any coverage.

Attacks against the press continued under the administration of President Enrique Peña Nieto. Violence has compromised the news that reaches the rest of the world. Local journalists are largely responsible for reporting what happens day-to-day in Mexico and the international media relies on them.

Violence against journalists and media workers increased by 85% during the presidency of Andrés Manuel López Obrador. López Obrador, who frequently attacks journalists and independent news outlets during his morning briefings, has often downplayed the threats against the press.

There was a surge of killings in early 2022.

== Before the Mexican drug war ==
=== Reform War, Second Empire and Restored Republic ===
Date	Name	Location	Media outlet	Status	Refs
25 December 1860	Vicente Segura Argüelles	Mexico	Diario de Avisos	Killed	
1863	Carlos R. Casarín	Mexico	La Orquesta; Mi Sombrero	Killed	
23 September 1866	Donato Corzo Ruiz	Chiapas	La Tijera	Killed	

=== Porfiriato and Revolution ===
Date	Name	Location	Media outlet	Status	Refs
27 April 1880	Santiago Sierra	State of Mexico	La Libertad	Killed	
17 February 1885	Luis González y González	Morelia, Michoacán	El Acero; El Explorador	Killed	
28 April 1887	Roberto Berea	Mexico	N/A	Killed	
13 May 1892	Pablo Ochoa	Mexico	El Norte de Chihuahua	Killed	
2 April 1894	Emilio Ordóñez	Pachuca, Hidalgo	N/A	Killed	
30 July 1895	Jesús Olmos y Contreras	Puebla	Crisis; La Voz de la Verdad	Killed	
27 January 1897	José Cayetano Valadés Rocha; Pen name: (Asunción Sánchez)	Mazatlán, Sinaloa	La Tarántula	Killed	
April 1901	Eusebio S. Almonte	Mezcala, Guerrero	El Eco del Sur	Killed	
30 August 1902	Vicente Rivero Echegaray	Tampico, Tamaulipas	Bala Rasa	Killed	
1908	Luis Díaz Coudert	Mexico	El Diario de Chihuahua	Killed	
1 June 1911	José Sabás de la Mora	Culiacán, Sinaloa	Voz del Norte	Killed	
11 August 1912	Ignacio Herrerías	Tlaltizapán, Morelos	El Tiempo	Killed	
11 August 1912	Humberto León Strauss	Tlaltizapán, Morelos	El Imparcial	Killed	
11 August 1912	José Luis Rivera	Tlaltizapán, Morelos	N/A	Killed	
12 September 1912	José Gurdiel Fernández	Balancán, Tabasco	El Correo de Tabasco	Killed	
12 September 1912	Renon de la Moral	Balancán, Tabasco	N/A	Killed	
1913	– de la Torre	Mexico	N/A	Killed	(Note: There was a journalist killed in 1913 but only his surname is known.)
9 February 1913	Mariano Duque	Mexico City	El Defensor del Pueblo	Killed	
22 February 1913	José Rumbia	Tlaxcala, Tlaxcala	La Nueva República	Killed	
27 August 1913	Solón Argüello	Mexico City	Nueva Era	Killed	
December 1913	Víctor David Delgado	Chihuahua	N/A	Killed	
August 1914	A.F. Paredes	Cananea, Sonora	La Voz de Cananea	Killed	
August 1914	Donancio Chávez	Cananea, Sonora	La Verdad	Killed	
September 1914	Manuel M. Hugues	Cananea, Sonora	N/A	Killed	
13 December 1914	Paulino Martínez	Mexico	El Chinaco; La Voz de Juárez	Killed	

=== Constitution of 1917 to Presidency of Lázaro Cardenas ===
Date	Name	Location	Media outlet	Status	Refs
9 February 1917	Faustino Díaz	Sinaloa	El Monitor Sinaloense	Disappeared	
1918	Lázaro Gutiérrez de Lara	Saric, Sonora	Revolución	Killed	
1919	Marcos Torres Collado	Cunduacán, Tabasco	El Chisme	Killed	
1920s	Juan Rafael Durán	San Pedro, Coahuila	El Látigo; La Opinión	Killed	
April 1920	Francisco Rangel	Guadalajara, Jalisco	Verbo Libre	Killed	
12 October 1920	Manuel Lezcano	Villahermosa, Tabasco	El Radical	Killed	
19 July 1921	Florencio Ávila y Castillo	Mérida, Yucatán	Asociación de Periodistas de Yucatán	Killed	
24 May 1922	Jesús Z. Moreno	Mexico City	El Heraldo de México	Killed	
1923–1924	Pedro Flores González	Mexico City	N/A	Killed	
23 June 1923	Ángel Pulido	State of Mexico	El Implacable	Killed	
28 July 1924	José Carmen Hernández	Mexico	El Colmillo; El Colmillo Público	Killed	
5 February 1927	Archibaldo Clark	Magdalena, Sonora	El Heraldo	Killed	
April 1927	Anacleto González Flores	Guadalajara, Jalisco	La Palabra	Killed	
4 October 1927	Alonso Capetillo	Huitzilac, Morelos	N/A	Killed	
2 October 1928	Enrique Woolfolk	Magdalena de Kino, Sonora	La Revista	Killed	
31 May 1929	Luis D. Kluver	Agua Prieta, Sonora	La Vanguardia	Killed	
13 September 1930	Arturo García	Tuxtla Gutiérrez, Chiapas	Regeneración; Chiapas Nuevo	Killed	
7 February 1936	Julián S. González	Mexico City	El Tiempo	Killed	
20 April 1939	José Trinidad Mata Mora	Puebla	Avante	Killed	

=== Presidencies of Manuel Ávila Camacho to Luis Echeverría, 1940–1976 ===
Date	Name	Location	Media outlet	Status	Refs
15 October 1942	Eduardo Galdámez	Tapachula, Chiapas	El Sur de México	Killed	
3 April 1944	Ignacio F. Herrerías	Mexico City	Novedades	Killed	
19 April 1944	Salvador Guerrero González	Torreón, Coahuila	La Opinión	Killed	
31 March 1947	Vicente Villasana González	Ciudad Victoria, Tamaulipas	El Mundo	Killed	
11 November 1948	Fernando Sánchez Bretón	Mexico City	La Semana Ilustrada	Killed	
19 November 1949	José María Jiménez Rubio; Pen name: (Nicanor)	Mazatlán, Sinaloa	El Correo de la Tarde	Killed	
24 October 1953	Raúl Parra Molina	Salina Cruz, Oaxaca	La Voz de Sureste	Killed	
July 1956	Manuel Acosta Meza	Tijuana, Baja California	El Imparcial	Killed	
2 September 1956	Fernando Márquez Sánchez	Tijuana, Baja California	Baja California	Killed	
28 May 1957	Manuel Sánchez Hernández	Tepic, Nayarit	La Extra de la Tarde	Killed	
24 April 1959	Jorge Salinas Aragón	Minatitlán, Veracruz	Diario de Sotavento	Killed	
26 November 1961	Carlos Estrada Sastré	Tijuana, Baja California	Noticias	Killed	
5 July 1964	José González Miravalles; Pen name (Pepe Miravalles)	Acapulco, Guerrero	Novedades	Killed	
15 April 1968	Juan Muñoz Flores	Jojutla, Morelos	Alarma; La voz de Morelos	Killed	
1 January 1970	Carlos Denegri	Mexico	Excélsior	Killed	
8 October 1970	Ernesto Espinosa Hernández	Chihuahua, Chihuahua	La Jeringa	Killed	
31 July 1971	Vicente García Medina	El Fuerte, Sinaloa	El Avance	Killed	
1973	José Asunción Méndez	Chihuahua	La Jeringa	Killed	
7 July 1975	Carlos López y López	Miahuatlán, Oaxaca	El Demócrata de Antequerda	Killed	

=== Presidencies of José López Portillo to Ernesto Zedillo, 1976–2000 ===
Date	Name	Location	Media outlet	Status	Refs
31 July 1977	Mario Carlos Rodríguez Falcón	Sinaloa	N/A	Killed	(Note: Other sources identify him as Martín Falcón Rodríguez or as Mario Falcón Rodríguez.)
22 August 1977	José Guadalupe Mendívil	Culiacán, Sinaloa	Diario de Sinaloa	Killed	
16 February 1978	Roberto Martínez Montenegro	Culiacán, Sinaloa	Noreste; Diario de Culiacán	Killed	
13 September 1978	Álvaro Burgoa López	Oaxaca, Oaxaca	Critica; La Prensa	Killed	
28 September 1978	Patricio Pérez Pintado	Loma Bonita, Oaxaca	El Pinero	Killed	
1979	Álvaro Alemán	Oaxaca	El Demócrata de Antequera	Killed	
1979	Guillermo Gallardo Astorga	Chihuahua, Chihuahua	Índice	Killed	
13 December 1979	Alberto Rodríguez Torres	Pachuca, Hidalgo	Solución; Avanzando de Hidalgo	Killed	
1980	Guadalupe Ochoa Villaverde	Los Mochis, Sinaloa	El Gráfico	Killed	
1980	Alberto José Altamirano Ortega	Poza Rica, Veracruz	Diario de Poza Rica	Killed	
1980	Jorge Pliego Rodríguez	Veracruz, Veracruz	El Dictamen	Killed	
7 June 1980	Aarón Flores Heredia	Los Mochis, Sinaloa	El Debate	Killed	
1981	Jorge Pérez Díaz	Mexico City	Informex	Killed	
21 February 1981	Jorge Ortiz Lagunas	Cuernavaca, Morelos	Diario de Morelos	Killed	
16 October 1981	Xicoténcatl Ureña Zepeda	Apatzingán, Michoacán	Tribuna Libre	Killed	
27 June 1982	Cristóbal Sánchez Reyes	Acayucan, Veracruz	Diario de Jalapa	Killed	
1983	Mario Centeno Gómez	Nezahualcóyotl, State of Mexico	N/A	Killed	
1983	Mario Hernández Beltrán	Iztapalapa, Mexico City	N/A	Killed	
27 February 1983	Mario Centeno Yáñez	Naucalpan, State of Mexico	Pregunta	Killed	(Note: It is unclear if Mario Centeno Yáñez was a journalist; other sources state he carried a journalist identity card without being one.)
20 April 1983	Julián Sánchez Beltrán	Tláhuac, Mexico City	Radio Visión Activa	Killed	(Note: It is unclear if Julián Sánchez Beltrán was a journalist; other sources state he carried a journalist identity card without being one.)
17 May 1983	Eliseo Morán Muñoz	Puente de Ixtla, Morelos	La Voz	Killed	
25 December 1983	Salvador Cruz Cervantes	Córdoba, Veracruz	El Mundo de Orizaba	Killed	
1984	Jorge Fernández Garduño	Nezahualcóyotl, State of Mexico	El Mercurio	Killed	(Note: It is unclear if Jorge Fernández Garduño (also known as Jorge Hernández Garduño) was a journalist; other sources state he carried a journalist identity card without being one. Another source says he was killed in Querétaro.)
1984	Julio Hernández Garduño	Ciudad Victoria, Tamaulipas	N/A	Killed	
1984	Francisco Saldívar Reyes	Reynosa, Tamaulipas	N/A	Killed	
30 May 1984	Manuel Buendía Tellezgirón	Mexico City	Excélsior	Killed	
31 May 1984	Javier Juárez Vázquez	Veracruz	Primera Plana	Killed	
30 January 1985	John Clay Walker	Guadalajara, Jalisco	Freelance journalist	Killed	
17 January 1985	José Antonio Godoy Mena	Ayutla de los Libres, Guerrero	El Correo de Iguala	Killed	(Note: It is unclear if José Antonio Godoy Mena (also known as Jesús Godoy Mena) was a journalist; other sources state he was a businessman instead.)
6 March 1985	Emilio Santiago Alvarado	Tehuacán, Puebla	Portavoz	Killed	(Note: It is unclear if Emilio Santiago Alvarado was a journalist; other sources state he was a spokesman for the newspaper.)
25 October 1985	Roberto Ornelas Reyes	Mazatlán, Sinaloa	Noroeste	Killed	
1986	Héctor López López	Sinaloa	N/A	Killed	
1986	Pablo Nájera López	Sinaloa	Gaceta del Aire	Killed	
7 May 1986	José Luis Nava Landa	Chilpancingo, Guerrero	Expresión Popular	Killed	
8 August 1986	Eleuterio Cachú de la Cerda	Tijuana, Baja California	El Heraldo	Killed	
17 June 1986	Jorge Breñas Araya	Reynosa, Tamaulipas	El Río	Killed	
17 July 1986	C. David Cárdenas Rueda	Veracruz, Veracruz	Notiver	Killed	
17 July 1986	Norma Alicia Moreno Figueroa	Matamoros, Tamaulipas	El Popular	Killed	
17 July 1986	Ernesto Flores Torrijos	Matamoros, Tamaulipas	El Popular	Killed	
15 August 1986	Juan Manuel Félix Zueta	Culiacán, Sinaloa	Diario de Sinaloa	Killed	
7 October 1986	Odilón López Urias	Guamúchil, Sinaloa	Onda	Killed	
5 November 1986	Antonio Iván Menéndez Marcín	Mexico City	Le Monde diplomatique	Killed	
10 December 1986	Manuel Rodríguez Rodríguez	Mexico City	El Nacional	Killed	
2 March 1987	Martín Ortiz Moreno	Acapulco, Guerrero	Ovaciones; Nueva Era	Killed	(Note: Another source identifies him as Mario Ortiz Moreno.)
16 October 1987	Jesús Michel Jacobo	Culiacán, Sinaloa	El Sol de Sinaloa	Killed	
19 October 1987	Clementina Herreros Andrade	Mexico City	La Prensa	Killed	(Note: She was also identified as Mafalda Clementina Herros Andrade.)
28 December 1987	Felipe González Hernández	Nezahualcóyotl, State of Mexico	Un Minuto en la Noticia	Killed	(Note: It is unclear if Felipe González Hernández (also known as Felipe González Herrera) was a journalist; other sources state he carried a journalist identity card without being one.)
22 February 1988	Manuel Burgueño Orduño	Mazatlán, Sinaloa	Deslinde; El Sol del Pacífico	Killed	
19 March 1988	Damián Sergio de Luna	Mexico City	Revelación	Killed	(Note: Another source identifies him as Sergio Luis de Luna Daniel.)
20 April 1988	Héctor Félix Miranda	Tijuana, Baja California	Zeta	Killed	
15 July 1988	Ronay González Reyes	Comitán, Chiapas	El Mundo	Killed	(Note: He was also identified as Ronay Jiménez Gómez or as Ramón González Gómez.)
23 July 1988	Linda Bejarano de Gómez	Ciudad Juárez, Chihuahua	XHIJ-TV	Killed	(Note: She was also identified as Herlinda Bejarano de Gómez.)
15 October 1988	Rigoberto Coria Ochoa	Acapulco, Guerrero	El Trópico	Killed	
1989	Joel Herrera Zurita	Mexico	El Dictamen	Killed	
11 January 1989	Ezequiel Huerta Acosta	Saltillo, Coahuila	Avances Políticos	Killed	
19 January 1989	Alberto Ruvalcaba Torres	Jalisco	Novedades de Zapopan	Killed	
11 April 1989	Humberto Gallegos Sobrino	Chiapas	N/A	Killed	
23 April 1989	Armando Sánchez Herrera	Río Verde, San Luis Potosí	Momento	Killed	
May 1989	Francisco Valencia Gómez	Michoacán	N/A	Killed	
29 June 1989	Óscar Treviño	Matamoros, Tamaulipas	N/A	Killed	
30 June 1989	Elías Mario Medina Valenzuela	Durango, Durango	El Norte; El Sol de Durango	Killed	
October 1989	Ismael León León	Nezahualcóyotl, State of Mexico	Informeza	Killed	
23 November 1989	Martín Heredia Sánchez	Huatusco, Veracruz	El Sol del Centro	Disappeared	
19 December 1989	Rodolfo Mendoza Morales	Puebla	El Heraldo de México – Puebla	Killed	
23 December 1989	Elvira Marcelo Esquivel	Mexico City	El Día	Killed	
1990	Raúl Zúñiga	Oaxaca, Oaxaca	N/A	Killed	
19 January 1990	Antonio Díaz Vargas	Matamoros, Tamaulipas	El Diario	Killed	
10 March 1990	Jaime Huitrón Vega	Tula, Hidalgo	Tollan	Killed	
4 May 1990	Roberto Azúa Camacho	Reynosa, Tamaulipas	El Nacional	Killed	
6 June 1990	Alfredo Córdova Solórzano	Tapachula, Chiapas	Unomásdos	Killed	
1991	Lázaro Cárdenas	Michoacán	Radio Azul	Killed	
1 February 1991	Carlos Alberto Medina	Mexico	Excélsior	Killed	
16 March 1991	Primitivo González Becerra	Guadalajara, Jalisco	El Diario	Killed	
6 April 1991	Alejandro Campos Moreno	Cuernavaca, Morelos	Diario de Morelos	Killed	
3 July 1991	Víctor Manuel Oropeza	Ciudad Juárez, Chihuahua	Diario de Juárez	Killed	
7 October 1991	Juvencio Arenas Gálvez	Mexico City	Cuestión	Killed	
14 October 1991	Gabriel Venegas Valencia	Mexico	Televisa	Killed	
3 January 1992	Fernando Preciado Escobar	Tapachula, Chiapas	La Opinión de la Costa	Killed	
7 April 1992	Nicandro López Vásquez	Oaxaca	XEKZ-AM	Killed	
13 November 1992	Ignacio Mendoza Castillo	Mexico City	La Voz del Caribe	Killed	
28 December 1992	Jesús Núñez Sánchez	Tlalnepantla, State of Mexico	Objetivo	Killed	
January 1993	Carlos Aguilar Garza	Nuevo Laredo, Tamaulipas	Y Punto	Killed	
23 January 1993	Maximiano Quirino Escobar	Reynosa, Tamaulipas	Consigna de Reynosa	Killed	
1 February 1993	Roberto Antonio Mancilla Herrera	Tuxtla Gutiérrez, Chiapas	Es! Cuarto Poder	Killed	
5 March 1993	José Herrera Cañas	Mexico City	Servicios Fotográficos Personales	Killed	
15 March 1993	Jessica Elizalde de León	Ciudad Juárez, Chihuahua	FM 106; Radio Centro	Killed	
2 June 1993	Araceli Caballero Hernández	Ecatepec, State of Mexico	El Día	Killed	
30 July 1993	Gregorio Sánchez Mora	Veracruz	La Voz del Pueblo	Killed	
17 March 1994	José Agustín Reyes	La Paz, Baja California	Cadena RASA; El Heraldo de México	Killed	
6 June 1994	Jorge Martín Dorantes	Morelos	El Crucero	Killed	
6 July 1994	Enrique Peralta Torres	Morelos	La Unión de Morelos	Killed	
11 July 1994	José Luis Rojas	Cuernavaca, Morelos	La Unión de Morelos	Killed	
1995	Cuauhtémoc Ornelas Ocampo	Torreón, Coahuila	Alcance	Disappeared	
5 February 1995	Ruperto Armenta Gerardo	Guasave, Sinaloa	El Regional	Killed	
18 June 1995	Dante Espartaco Cortés	Tijuana, Baja California	El Mexicano	Killed	
25 October 1996	Fernando Martínez Ochoa	Chihuahua	Government journalist	Killed	
28 November 1996	Edgar Mason	Huitzilac, Morelos	Economics columnist	Killed	
3 December 1996	Fernando Balderas Sánchez	Mexico City	Crime journalist	Killed	
3 December 1996	Yolanda Figueroa	Mexico City	Crime book writer	Killed	
22 March 1997	Jesús Abel Bueno León	Chilpancingo, Guerrero	7 Días	Killed	
15 July 1997	Benjamín Flores González	San Luis Río Colorado, Sonora	La Prensa	Killed	
26 July 1997	Víctor Hernández Martínez	Mexico City	Cómo	Killed	
16 December 1997	Margarito Morales Ramírez	Cocula, Jalisco	El Nuevo Zitlán	Killed	
12 February 1998	Luis Mario García Rodríguez	Mexico City	La Tarde	Killed	
7 June 1998	Paco Stanley	Mexico City	TV Azteca	Killed	
3 August 1998	Sally-Sue Hulse	Mexico City	TIMES – Mexico City	Killed	
23 October 1998	Claudio Cortés García	Mexico City	Le Monde Diplomatique	Killed	
29 October 1998	Pedro Valle Hernández	Zihuatanejo, Guerrero	XEUQ Radio Variedades	Killed	
15 December 1998	Philip True	Jalisco	San Antonio Express-News	Killed	
15 April 1999	Mario Morales Palacios	Matamoros, Tamaulipas	El Bravo	Killed	
28 April 1999	Ramiro Ramírez Duarte	Zacapu, Michoacán	El Heraldo	Killed	
7 February 2000	Luis Roberto Cruz Martínez	Reynosa, Tamaulipas	Multicosas	Killed	
9 April 2000	Pablo Pineda Gaucín	Matamoros, Tamaulipas	La Opinión	Killed	
19 April 2000	Hugo Sánchez Eustaquio	Atizapan de Zaragoza, State of Mexico	La Verdad	Killed	
28 April 2000	José Ramírez Puente	Ciudad Juárez, Chihuahua	Radio Net	Killed	
22 June 2000	William Uicab Salas	Chetumal, Quintana Roo	Canal 8	Killed	
31 October 2000	Alfredo García Márquez	Hermosillo, Sonora	Encuentro	Killed	

=== Presidency of Vicente Fox, 2000–2006 ===
Date	Name	Location	Media outlet	Status	Refs
9 February 2001	Humberto Méndez Rendón	Gómez Palacio, Durango	Canal 6 de Durango	Killed	
21 February 2001	José Luis Ortega Mata	Ojinaga, Chihuahua	Seminario de Ojinaga	Killed	
9 March 2001	José Barbosa Bejarano	Ciudad Juárez, Chihuahua	Alarma	Killed	
27 March 2001	Saúl Antonio Martínez Gutiérrez	Matamoros, Tamaulipas	El Imparcial	Killed	
12 January 2002	Félix Alfonso Fernández García	Miguel Alemán, Tamaulipas	Nueva Opción	Killed	
1 February 2002	Julio Samuel Morales Ferrón; Pen name: (Severo Mirón)	Tacuba, Mexico City	El Sol de México	Killed	
15 October 2002	José Miranda Virgen	Veracruz	El Sur de Veracruz	Killed	
10 June 2003	Jesús Sandalio Mejía Lechuga	Martínez de la Torre, Veracruz	Primera Hora; MS Noticias	Killed	
15 September 2003	Gregorio Urieta	Acapulco, Guerrero	El Sur	Killed	
13 December 2003	Rafael Villafuerte Aguilar	Ciudad Altamirano, Guerrero	La Razón	Killed	
11 February 2004	Alberto Torres Villegas	Córdoba, Veracruz	El Sol del Centro	Killed	
21 February 2004	Míriam Denise Ramos Delgado	Hermosillo, Sonora	Notimex	Killed	
19 March 2004	Roberto Javier Mora García	Nuevo Laredo, Tamaulipas	El Mañana	Killed	
22 June 2004	Francisco Javier Ortiz Franco	Tijuana, Baja California	Zeta	Killed	
31 August 2004	Francisco Arratia Saldierna	Matamoros, Tamaulipas	El Imparcial; El Regional	Killed	
9 September 2004	Leodegario Aguilera Lucas	Guerrero	Mundo Político	Killed	
28 November 2004	Gregorio Rodríguez Hernández	Escuinapa, Sinaloa	El Debate	Killed	
2 April 2005	Alfredo Jiménez Mota	Hermosillo, Sonora	El Imparcial	Disappeared	
8 April 2005	Raúl Gibb Guerrero	Poza Rica, Veracruz	La Opinión	Killed	
16 April 2005	Dolores Guadalupe García Escamilla	Nuevo Laredo, Tamaulipas	Stereo 91	Killed	
17 September 2005	José Reyes Brambila	Guadalajara, Jalisco	Vallarta Milenio	Killed	
31 October 2005	Hugo Barragán Ortiz	Tierra Blanca, Veracruz	XEJF Radio Max; La Crónica de la Cuenca	Killed	
25 October 2005	Julio César Martínez Pérez	Reynosa, Tamaulipas	Siglo de México	Killed	
6 January 2006	José Valdés	Sabinas, Coahuila	91.9 La Más Buena	Killed	
9 March 2006	Jaime Arturo Olvera Bravo	La Piedad, Michoacán	La Voz de Michoacán	Killed	
10 March 2006	Ramiro Téllez Contreras	Nuevo Laredo, Tamaulipas	Exa 95.7	Killed	
26 March 2006	Rosendo Pardo Ozuna	Tuxtla Gutiérrez, Chiapas	La Voz del Sureste	Killed	
8 July 2006	Rafael Ortiz Martínez	Monclova, Coahuila	Zócalo	Disappeared	
10 August 2006	Enrique Perea Quintanilla	Chihuahua, Chihuahua	Dos Caras, Una Verdad	Killed	
27 October 2006	Bradley Will	Santa Lucía del Camino, Oaxaca	Indymedia	Killed	
10 November 2006	Misael Tamayo Hernández	Zihuatanejo, Guerrero	El Despertar de la Costa	Killed	
17 November 2006	José Manuel Nava Sánchez	Mexico City	Excélsior; El Sol de México	Killed	
20 November 2006	José Antonio García Apac	Tepalcatepec, Michoacán	Ecos de la Cuenca	Disappeared	
21 November 2006	Roberto Marcos García	Veracruz	Alarma; Testimonio	Killed	
30 November 2006	Alfonso Sánchez Guzmán	Orizaba, Veracruz	Enlace Veracruz; Televisa Veracruz	Killed	
8 December 2006	Raúl Marcial Pérez	Oaxaca, Oaxaca	El Gráfico	Killed	

== During the Mexican drug war ==
=== Presidency of Felipe Calderón ===
Date	Name	Location	Media outlet	Status	Refs
17 January 2007	Gerardo Guevara Domínguez	Ocampo, Durango	Siglo XXI	Killed	
20 January 2007	Rodolfo Rincón Taracena	Villahermosa, Tabasco	Tabasco Hoy	Killed	
6 April 2007	Amado Ramírez Dillanes	Acapulco, Guerrero	Radiorama	Killed	
16 April 2007	Saúl Noé Martínez Ortega	Nuevo Casas Grandes, Chihuahua	Interdiario	Killed	
9 May 2007	Gabriel González Rivera	Mexico City	Denuncia ciudadana	Killed	
5 September 2007	Óscar Rivera Inzunza	Culiacán, Sinaloa	Noroeste	Killed	
8 October 2007	Mateo Cortés Martínez	Tehuantepec, Oaxaca	El Imparcial del Istmo	Killed	
8 October 2007	Agustín López Nolasco	Tehuantepec, Oaxaca	El Imparcial del Istmo	Killed	
8 October 2007	Flor Vásquez López	Tehuantepec, Oaxaca	El Imparcial del Istmo	Killed	
3 December 2007	Gastón Alonso Acosta Toscano	Aguas Prieta, Sonora	Noticias de la Frontera	Killed	
8 December 2007	Gerardo Israel García Pimentel	Uruapan, Michoacán	La Opinión de Michoacán	Killed	
8 December 2007	Juan Pablo Solís	Tuxpan, Michoacán	Radio Zitácuaro	Killed	
7 January 2008	Claudia Rodríguez Llera	State of Mexico	Revista Cinemagazine; Radio Mix Ecatepec	Killed	
5 February 2008	Francisco Ortiz Monroy	Camargo, Tamaulipas	Diario de México	Killed	
7 February 2008	Bonifacio Cruz Santiago	Nezahualcóyotl, State of Mexico	El Real	Killed	
7 February 2008	Alfonso Cruz Cruz	Nezahualcóyotl, State of Mexico	El Real	Killed	
12 February 2008	Mauricio Estrada Zamora	Apatzingán, Michoacán	La Opinión de Apatzingán	Disappeared	
7 April 2008	Teresa Bautista Merino	Putla de Guerrero, Oaxaca	Radio Copala	Killed	
7 April 2008	Felicitas Martínez Sánchez	Putla de Guerrero, Oaxaca	Radio Copala	Killed	
25 June 2008	Candelario Pérez Pérez	Ciudad Juárez, Chihuahua	Freelance journalist	Killed	
24 September 2008	Alejandro Zenón Fonseca Estrada	Villahermosa, Tabasco	Exa FM	Killed	
10 October 2008	Francisco Javier Salas	Tijuana, Baja California	El Mexicano	Killed	
10 October 2008	David García Monroy	Chihuahua, Chihuahua	La Jornada; El Diario de Chihuahua	Killed	
10 October 2008	Miguel Angel Villagómez Valle	Lázaro Cárdenas, Michoacán	La Noticia de Michoacán	Killed	
13 November 2008	Armando Rodríguez Carreón	Ciudad Juárez, Chihuahua	El Diario de Juárez	Killed	
14 December 2008	Raúl Martínez López	Poza Rica, Veracruz	Noreste de Poza Rica	Killed	
13 February 2009	Jean Paul Ibarra Ramírez	Iguala, Guerrero	El Correo	Killed	
24 February 2009	Luis Daniel Méndez Hernández	Huayacocotla, Veracruz	La Poderosa	Killed	
27 February 2009	Juan Carlos Hernández Mundo	Taxco, Guerrero	El Quijote; Ultimátum de Taxco	Killed	
3 May 2009	Carlos Ortega Samper	Santa María El Oro, Durango	El Tiempo de Durango	Killed	
26 May 2009	Eliseo Barrón Hernández	Gómez Palacio, Durango	La Opinión – Milenio	Killed	
12 July 2009	Martín Javier Miranda Avilés	Zitácuaro, Michoacán	Quadratín; Panorama	Killed	
14 July 2009	Ernesto Montañez Valdivia	Ciudad Juárez, Chihuahua	Enfoque del Sol de Chihuahua	Killed	
28 July 2009	Juan Daniel Martínez Gil	Acapulco, Guerrero	Radiorama Acapulco	Killed	
21 September 2009	Jaime Omar Gándara Sanmartín	Chihuahua, Chihuahua	Freelance photographer	Killed	
23 September 2009	Norberto Miranda Madrid	Casas Grandes, Chihuahua	Radio Visión	Killed	
10 October 2009	Gerardo Esparza Mata	Durango, Durango	Local government reporter	Killed	
11 October 2009	Fabián Ramírez López	Mazatlán, Sinaloa	La Magia 97.1	Killed	
2 November 2009	José Vladimir Antuna García	Durango, Durango	El Tiempo de Durango	Killed	
11 November 2009	María Esther Aguilar Cansimbe	Zamora, Michoacán	Diario de Zamora; Cambio de Michoacán	Disappeared	
24 November 2009	José Emilio Galindo Robles	Ciudad Guzmán, Jalisco	Radio Universidad de Guadalajara	Killed	
23 December 2009	José Alberto Velázquez López	Tulum, Quintana Roo	Expresiones de Tulum	Killed	
16 January 2010	José Luis Romero	Los Mochis, Sinaloa	Línea Directa	Killed	
8 January 2010	Valentín Valdés Espinosa	Saltillo, Coahuila	Zócalo de Saltillo	Killed	
29 January 2010	Jorge Ochoa Martínez	Ayutla de los Libres, Guerrero	El Sol de la Costa	Killed	
March 2010	Miguel Ángel Domínguez Zamora	Reynosa, Tamaulipas	El Mañana de Reynosa	Disappeared	
March 2010	Pedro Argüello	Reynosa, Tamaulipas	La Tarde; El Mañana de Reynosa	Disappeared	
March 2010	David Silva	Reynosa, Tamaulipas	La Tarde; El Mañana de Reynosa	Disappeared	
2 March 2010	Jorge Rábago Valdez	Reynosa, Tamaulipas	La Prensa	Killed	
12 March 2010	Evaristo Pacheco Solís	Chilpancingo, Guerrero	Visión Informativa	Killed	
6 April 2010	Ramón Ángeles Zalpa	Michoacán	Cambio de Michoacán	Disappeared	
10 April 2010	Enrique Villicaña Palomares	Morelia, Michoacán	La Voz de Michoacán	Killed	
20 April 2010	Evaristo Ortega Zárate	Colipa, Veracruz	Espacio	Disappeared	
17 April 2010	María Isabella Cordero	Chihuahua, Chihuahua	Televisa Chihuahua	Killed	
10 May 2010	Gamaliel López Candanosa	Monterrey, Nuevo León	TV Azteca Monterrey	Disappeared	
10 May 2010	Gerardo Paredes Pérez	Monterrey, Nuevo León	TV Azteca Monterrey	Disappeared	
23 June 2010	Miguel Ángel Bueno Méndez	Huixquilucan, State of Mexico	Diario Nuestro Distrito	Killed	
28 June 2010	Juan Francisco Rodríguez Ríos	Coyuca de Benítez, Guerrero	El Sol de Acapulco	Killed	
28 June 2010	María Elvira Hernández Galeana	Coyuca de Benítez, Guerrero	Nueva Línea	Killed	
6 July 2010	Hugo Alfredo Olivera Cartas	Apatzingán, Michoacán	Quadratín; La Voz de Michoacán	Killed	
10 July 2010	Marco Aurelio Martínez Tijerina	Montemorelos, Nuevo León	XEDD Radio La Tremenda	Killed	
10 July 2010	Guillermo Alcaraz Trejo	Chihuahua, Chihuahua	State government journalist	Killed	
7 September 2010	Marcelo Tenorio Ocampo	Campeche	N/A	Killed	
16 September 2010	Luis Carlos Santiago Orozco	Ciudad Juárez, Chihuahua	El Diario de Juárez	Killed	
27 September 2010	Rafael Armando Muro	Ciudad Juárez, Chihuahua	Chihuahuapost.com	Killed	
30 September 2010	Juan Francisco García Márquez	Ciudad Juárez, Chihuahua	Diario PM	Killed	
4 October 2010	José Juan Núñez Sarabia	Santiago Papasquiaro, Durango	N/A	Killed	
28 October 2010	Selene Hernández León	Toluca, State of Mexico	Nuestro Tiempo	Killed	
5 November 2010	Carlos Alberto Guajardo Romero	Matamoros, Tamaulipas	Expreso Matamoros	Killed	
9 February 2011	Rodolfo Ochoa Moreno	Torreón, Coahuila	Grupo Multimedios Laguna	Killed	
25 March 2011	Luis Emmanuel Ruiz Carrillo	Guadalupe, Nuevo León	La Prensa	Killed	
25 March 2011	José Luis Cerda Meléndez	Guadalupe, Nuevo León	Televisa Monterrey	Killed	
31 May 2011	Noel López Olguín	Chinameca, Veracruz	La Verdad de Jáltipan	Killed	
7 June 2011	Marco Antonio López Ortiz	Acapulco, Guerrero	Novedades Acapulco	Disappeared	
14 June 2011	Pablo Ruelas Barraza	Huatabampo, Sonora	Diario del Yaqui; El Regional de Sonora	Killed	
20 June 2011	Miguel Ángel López Velasco	Veracruz	Notiver	Killed	
20 June 2011	Misael López Solana	Veracruz	Notiver	Killed	
3 July 2011	Ángel Castillo Corona	Ocuilan, State of Mexico	Puntual; Diario de México	Killed	
26 July 2011	Yolanda Ordaz de la Cruz	Veracruz, Veracruz	Notiver	Killed	
1 September 2011	Ana María Marcela Yarce Viveros	Iztapalapa, Mexico City	Contralínea	Killed	
1 September 2011	Rocío González Trápaga	Iztapalapa, Mexico City	Televisa Mexico City	Killed	
20 September 2011	Manuel Gabriel Fonseca Hernández	Acayucán, Veracruz	El Mañanero	Disappeared	
24 September 2011	María Elizabeth Macías Castro	Nuevo Laredo, Tamaulipas	Primera Hora	Killed	
25 August 2011	Humberto Millán Salazar	Culiacán, Sinaloa	A Discusión; Radio Fórmula Culiacán	Killed	
3 December 2011	Hugo César Muruato Flores	Chihuahua, Chihuahua	La Caliente 90.9	Killed	
7 January 2012	Raúl Régulo Quirino Garza	Cadereyta, Nuevo León	La Última Palabra	Killed	
20 April 2012	Héctor Javier Salinas Aguirre	Chihuahua, Chihuahua	920 Radio Noticias	Killed	
20 April 2012	Javier Moya Muñoz	Chihuahua, Chihuahua	920 Radio Noticias	Killed	
28 April 2012	Regina Martínez Pérez	Xalapa, Veracruz	Proceso	Killed	
3 May 2012	Gabriel Huge Córdova	Boca del Río, Veracruz	Notiver	Killed	
3 May 2012	Guillermo Luna Varela	Boca del Río, Veracruz	Veracruznews	Killed	
3 May 2012	Esteban Rodríguez	Boca del Río, Veracruz	Diario AZ	Killed	
3 May 2012	Ana Irasema Becerra Jiménez	Boca del Río, Veracruz	El Dictamen	Killed	
13 May 2012	René Orta Salgado	Cuernavaca, Morelos	El Sol de Cuernavaca	Killed	
18 May 2012	Marco Antonio Ávila García	Empalme, Sonora	Diario Sonora de la Tarde; El Regional de Ciudad Obregón	Killed	
21 May 2012	Zane Plemmons	Nuevo Laredo, Tamaulipas	Freelance journalist	Disappeared	
14 June 2012	Víctor Manuel Báez Chino	Xalapa, Veracruz	Milenio Xalapa	Killed	
23 June 2012	Federico Manuel García Contreras	Tanquián de Escobedo, San Luis Potosí	Punto Crítico; Voces de Mediodía	Disappeared	
30 June 2012	Armando Montaño	Mexico City	The Associated Press	Killed	
25 July 2012	Miguel Morales Estrada	Poza Rica, Veracruz	Diario de Poza Rica	Disappeared	
19 August 2012	Ernesto Araujo Cano	Chihuahua, Chihuahua	El Heraldo de Chihuahua	Killed	
20 August 2012	José Antonio Aguilar Mota	Ecuandureo, Michoacán	Freelance photographer	Killed	
20 August 2012	Arturo Barajas López	Ecuandureo, Michoacán	Diario de Zamora	Killed	
15 October 2012	Ramón Abel López Aguilar	Tijuana, Baja California	Tijuana Informativo	Killed	
26 October 2012	Adela Jazmín Alcaraz López	San Luis Potosí, San Luis Potosí	Canal 12 Ríoverde	Disappeared	
14 November 2012	Adrián Silva Moreno	Tehuacán, Puebla	Freelance journalist	Killed	
27 November 2012	Sergio Landa Rosales	José Cardel, Veracruz	El Diario de Cardel	Disappeared	

=== Presidency of Enrique Peña Nieto ===
Date	Name	Location	Media outlet	Status	Refs
22 December 2012	David Araujo Arévalo	Acapulco, Guerrero	Novedades de Acapulco	Killed	
4 March 2013	Jaime Guadalupe González Domínguez	Ojinaga, Chihuahua	Ojinaganoticias.com.mx	Killed	
11 March 2013	Víctor Javier Campos	Agua Prieta, Sonora	El Diario de Juárez	Killed	
15 March 2013	Juan José García	Jiménez, Chihuahua	Televisa Chihuahua	Killed	
15 April 2013	Alonso de la Colina Sordo	Puebla, Puebla	TV Azteca Puebla	Killed	
24 April 2013	Daniel Alejandro Martínez Bazaldúa	Saltillo, Coahuila	Vanguardia	Killed	
30 April 2013	Gerardo José Padilla Blanquet	Saltillo, Coahuila	Radio Grande de Coahuila	Disappeared	
2 May 2013	Rosa María Ríos Campos	Morelia, Michoacán	Former TV presenter	Killed	
24 June 2013	Mario Ricardo Chávez Jorge	Reynosa, Tamaulipas	El Ciudadano	Killed	
17 July 2013	Alberto López Bello	Oaxaca, Oaxaca	El Imparcial	Killed	
5 November 2013	Alberto Angulo Gerardo	Angostura, Sinaloa	Televisa Hermosillo	Killed	
23 January 2014	Miguel Ángel Guzmán Garduño	Chilpancingo, Guerrero	Vértice	Killed	
5 February 2014	Gregorio Jiménez de la Cruz	Coatzacoalcos, Veracruz	Notisur; Liberal del Sur	Killed	
16 February 2014	Omar Reyes Fabián	Miahuatlán de Porfirio Díaz, Oaxaca	Tiempo	Killed	
28 February 2014	Benjamín Galván Gómez	Tamaulipas	Última Hora; Primera Hora	Killed	
2 June 2014	Jorge Torres Palacios	Acapulco, Guerrero	El Dictamen de Guerrero	Killed	
21 July 2014	Julián Bacasegua Castro	Guasave, Sinaloa	N/A	Disappeared	
30 July 2014	Nolberto Herrera Rodríguez	Guadalupe, Zacatecas	Canal 9	Killed	
12 August 2014	Octavio Rojas Hernández	Cosolapa, Oaxaca	El Buen Tono	Killed	
21 August 2014	Marlén Valdez García	Benito Juárez, Nuevo León	La Última Palabra	Killed	
27 August 2014	Adrián Gaona Belmonte	Reynosa, Tamaulipas	La Comadrita 97.3 FM Radio	Killed	
3 September 2014	Víctor Pérez Pérez	Ciudad Juárez, Chihuahua	Sucesos	Killed	
12 October 2014	Octavio Atilano Román Tirado	Mazatlán, Sinaloa	ABC Radio	Killed	
16 October 2014	María del Rosario Fuentes Rubio	Reynosa, Tamaulipas	Valor por Tamaulipas	Killed	
22 October 2014	Jesús Antonio Gamboa Urías	Los Mochis, Sinaloa	Nueva Prensa	Killed	
3 December 2014	Mario Alberto Crespo Ayón	Mazatlán, Sinaloa	Uno TV	Disappeared	
2 January 2015	Moisés Sánchez Cerezo	Medellín de Bravo, Veracruz	La Unión	Killed	
4 January 2015	Jazmín Martínez Sánchez	Ixtlán del Río, Nayarit	Televisa Tepic	Killed	
5 January 2015	Jesús Tapia Rodríguez	Parras de la Fuente, Coahuila	Parras TV	Killed	
6 April 2015	Jose Gutierrez Zamora Morales	Orizaba, Veracruz	MCLN	Disappeared	
14 April 2015	Abel Manuel Bautista Raymundo	Santiago Juxtlahuaca, Oaxaca	Radio Spacio 96.1 FM	Killed	
4 May 2015	Armando Saldaña Morales	Cosolapa, Oaxaca	Radio Max; Ke Buena	Killed	
18 June 2015	Ismael Díaz López	Teapa, Tabasco	El Criollo; Tabasco Hoy	Killed	
26 June 2015	Gerardo Nieto Álvarez	Comonfort, Guanajuato	El Tábano	Killed	
2 July 2015	Filadelfo Sánchez Sarmiento	Miahuatlán, Oaxaca	La Favorita 103.3 FM	Killed	
2 July 2015	Juan Mendoza Delgado	Medellín de Bravo, Veracruz	El Dictamen; Escribiendo la Verdad	Killed	
9 July 2015	Édgar Hernández García	Santa María Huatulco, Oaxaca	Oaxaca Foro Político	Killed	
31 July 2015	Rubén Espinosa Becerril	Mexico City	Proceso	Killed	
4 August 2015	Adrián Martínez López	Jalpa de Méndez, Tabasco	Glamour Arte Fotográfico	Killed	
6 August 2015	Juan Manuel Calderón García	San Blas, Nayarit	La Caliente 107.3 FM	Killed	
13 August 2015	Juan Heriberto Santos Cabrera	Orizaba, Veracruz	Televisa	Killed	
22 August 2015	Eduardo Herrera Sáenz	Piedras Negras, Coahuila	Televisa	Killed	
22 September 2015	David Alonso Correa Rangel	Ciudad Hidalgo, Michoacán	Freelance photographer	Killed	
23 September 2015	José Joaquín Pérez Morales	Villahermosa, Tabasco	Diario Presente	Killed	
23 September 2015	Aurelio Hernández Herrera	Villahermosa, Tabasco	Diario Presente	Killed	
28 December 2015	América Maribel Alva Larrazolo	Ciudad Juárez, Chihuahua	N/A	Killed	
21 January 2016	Marcos Hernández Bautista	San Andrés Huaxpaltepec, Oaxaca	Imagen de Oaxaca; Diario Noticias Voz	Killed	
22 January 2016	Reynel Martínez Cerqueda	Santiago Laollaga, Oaxaca	Manantial	Killed	
9 February 2016	Anabel Flores Salazar	Tehuacán, Puebla	El Sol de Orizaba	Killed	
20 February 2016	Moisés Félix Dagdug Lützow	Tabasco	Grupo VX	Killed	
25 April 2016	Francisco Pacheco Beltrán	Taxco, Guerrero	El Sol de Acapulco	Killed	
14 May 2016	Manuel Santiago Torres González	Poza Rica, Veracruz	TV Azteca, Radiover.com	Killed	
19 June 2016	Elidio Ramos Zárate	Oaxaca	El Sur	Killed	
20 June 2016	Zamira Esther Bautista	Tamaulipas	El Mercurio and La Verdad	Killed	
26 June 2016	Salvador García Olmos	Huajuapan de León, Oaxaca	Tu Un Ñuu Savi	Killed	
20 July 2016	Pedro Tamayo Rosas	Tierra Blanca, Veracruz	Al Calor Politico and Piñero de la Cuenca	Killed	
12 September 2016	Agustín Pavia	Huajuapan de León, Oaxaca	Tu Un Ñuu Savi	Killed	
14 September 2016	Aurelio Cabrera Campos	Huauchinango, Mexico City	El Gráfico de la Sierra	Killed	
10 December 2016	Jesús Adrián Rodríguez Samaniego	Chihuahua, Chihuahua	N/A	Killed	
22 February 2017	Carlos Alberto García Martínez	Tecomán, Colima	Radiorama Colima	Killed	
2 March 2017	Cecilio Pineda Birto	Ciudad Altamirano, Guerrero	La Voz de Tierra Caliente	Killed	
19 March 2017	Ricardo Monlui Cabrera	Yanga, Veracruz	El Sol de Córdoba	Killed	
24 March 2017	Miroslava Breach Velducea	Chihuahua, Chihuahua	Norte; La Jornada	Killed	
14 April 2017	Maximino Rodríguez Palacios	La Paz, Baja California Sur	Colectivo Pericú	Killed	
17 April 2017	Juan José Roldán	Calpulalpan, Tlaxcala	Síntesis de Tlaxcala	Killed	(Note: Another source stated he left his journalism profession five years before his death.)
1 May 2017	Filiberto Álvarez Landeros	Tlaquiltenango, Morelos	XHART-FM "La Señal"	Killed	
15 May 2017	Javier Valdez Cárdenas	Culiacán, Sinaloa	Ríodoce	Killed	
15 May 2017	Héctor Jonathan Rodríguez Córdoba	Autlán de Navarro, Jalisco	El Costeño	Killed	
18 May 2017	Salvador Adame Pardo	Múgica, Michoacán	Canal 6 TV	Disappeared	
10 July 2017	Edwin Rivera Paz	Acayucan, Veracruz	Hable	Killed	
31 July 2017	Luciano Rivera	Rosarito, Baja California	CNR TV	Killed	
3 August 2017	Rosario Ramos Flores	Centro, Tabasco	Portada	Disappeared	
22 August 2017	Cándido Ríos Vásquez	Hueyapan de Ocampo, Veracruz	El Diario de Acayucan	Killed	
6 October 2017	Édgar Daniel Esqueda Castro	San Luis Potosí, San Luis Potosí	Vox Populi; Metrópoli San Luis	Killed	
19 December 2017	Gumaro Pérez Aguilando	Veracruz	La Voz del Sur	Killed	
13 January 2018	Carlos Domínguez Rodríguez	Nuevo Laredo, Tamaulipas	Noreste Digital Horizonte de Matamoros	Killed	
5 February 2018	Leslie Ann Pamela Montenegro del Real "Nana Pelucas"	Acapulco, Guerrero	El Sillón	Killed	
21 March 2018	Leobardo Vázquez Atzin	Gutiérrez Zamora, Veracruz	Noreste; La Opinión de Poza Rica; Vanguardia; Enlace Gutiérrez Zamora	Killed	
15 May 2018	Juan Carlos Huerta	Villahermosa, Tabasco	Sin Reservas; Notinueve, XHTVL-TDT	Killed	
29 May 2018	Hector Gonzalez Antonio	Ciudad Victoria, Tamaulipas	Excélsior	Killed	
30 June 2018	José Guadalupe Chan Dzib	Felipe Carrillo Puerto, Quintana Roo	N/A	Killed	
21 September 2018	Mario Gómez	Yajalón, Chiapas	El Heraldo de Chiapas	Killed	
24 October 2018	Gabriel Soriano	Acapulco, Guerrero	Radio y Televisión de Guerrero	Killed	

=== Presidency of Andrés Manuel López Obrador ===
Date	Name	Location	Media outlet	Status	Refs
1 December 2018	Jesús Alejandro Márquez Jiménez	Tepic, Nayarit	Crítica	Killed	
6 December 2018	Diego García Corona	Ecatepec de Morelos, State of Mexico	Weekly Morelos	Killed	
20 January 2019	Rafael Murúa Manríquez	Santa Rosalía, Baja California Sur	Radiokashana FM	Killed	
9 February 2019	Jesús Ramos Rodríguez	Emiliano Zapata Municipality, Tabasco	Nuestra Región Hoy, XHEMZ-FM	Killed	
16 February 2019	Reynaldo López	Hermosillo, Sonora	N/A	Killed	
20 February 2019	Samir Flores Soberanes	Huexca, Morelos	Radio Amiltzinko	Killed	
15 March 2019	Santiago Barroso	San Luis Río Colorado, Sonora	San Luis Hoy – Red 653, XHEMW-FM	Killed	
20 March 2019	Omar Iván Camacho	Salvador Alvarado Municipality, Sinaloa	Noticieros Altavoz – Grupo Chávez Radio	Killed	
2 May 2019	Telésforo Santiago Enríquez	El Cafetal, San Agustín Loxicha, Oaxaca	Estéreo Cafetal	Killed	
18 May 2019	Francisco Romero	Playa del Carmen, Quintana Roo	Quintana Roo Hoy	Killed	
12 June 2019	Norma Sarabia Garduza	Huimanguillo, Tabasco	Tabasco Hoy	Killed	
30 July 2019	Rogelio Barragán	Zacatepec de Hidalgo, Morelos	Guerrero al instante	Killed	
2 August 2019	Édgar Alberto Nava López	Zihuatanejo de Azueta, Guerrero	The Truth of Zihuatanejo	Killed	
2 August 2019	Jorge Celestino Ruiz Vázquez	La Bocanita, Actopan, Veracruz	Graphic of Xalapa	Killed	
24 August 2019	Nevith Condés Jaramillo	Tejupilco, State of Mexico	El Observatoorio del Sur	Killed	
9 January 2020	Fidel Ávila Gómez	Huetamo, Michoacán	XHKN-FM	Killed	
20 February 2020	Aracely Alcocer Carmona	Ciudad Juárez, Chihuahua	La Poderosa	Killed	
11 March 2020	Mireya Ulloa Valencia	Poza Rica, Veracruz	La Opinión	Killed	
11 April 2020	Víctor Fernando Álvarez Chávez	Acapulco, Guerrero	Punto x Punto Noticias	Killed	
30 March 2020	María Elena Ferral Hernández	Papantla, Veracruz	Diario de Xalapa	Killed	
17 May 2020	Jorge Armenta Ávalos	Ciudad Obregón, Sonora	El Tiempo	Killed	
11 June 2020	José Luis Castillo Trejo	Ciudad Obregón, Sonora	Máxima prioridad	Killed	
3 August 2020	Pablo Morrugares Parraguirre	Iguala, Guerrero	P.M Noticias Guerrero web site	Killed	
22 August 2020	Juan Nelcio Espinoza Menera	Coahuila	Valedor TV	Killed while in police custody	
9 September 2020	Julio Valdivia	Tezonapa, Veracruz	El Mundo de Veracruz	Killed	
29 October 2020	Arturo Alba Medina	Ciudad Juárez, Chihuahua	Multimedios Ciudad Juárez	Killed	
2 November 2020	Jesús Alfonso Piñuelas Montes	Cajeme, Sonora	Independent camera operator	Killed	
9 November 2020	Israel Vázquez	Salamanca, Guanajuato	El Salmantino (digital platform)	Killed (shot)	
14 November 2020	Carlos Zataráin	Mazatlán, Sinaloa	Noroeste	Kidnapped	
17 June 2021	Gustavo Sánchez	Morro Mazatán, Oaxaca	Noticias Minuto a Minuto	Killed (shot)	
19 July 2021	Abraham Mendoza	Morelia, Michoacn		Killed (shot)	
22 July 2021	Ricardo López Jiménez	Guaymas, Sonora	Infoguaymas	Killed (shot)	
19 August 2021	Jacinto Romero Flores	Ixtaczoquitlán, Veracruz	Ori Stereo	Killed (shot)	
28 October 2021	Fredy López Arévalo	San Cristóbal de las Casas, Chiapas	XERA "Radio Uno"	Killed (shot)	
31 October 2021	Alfredo Cardoso Echeverría	Acapulco, Oaxaca	Las Dos Costas	Killed (shot)	
12 January 2022	José Luis Gamboa	Veracruz	Semanario Zeta	Killed (stabbed)	
17 January 2022	Margarito Martínez Esquivel	Tijuana, Baja California	Inforegio	Killed (shot)	
23 January 2022	Lourdes Maldonado López	Tijuana, Baja California	Primer Sistema de Noticias	Killed (shot)	
31 January 2022	Roberto Toledo	Zitácuaro, Michoacán	Monitor Michoacano	Killed (shot)	
10 February 2022	Heber López Vásquez	Salina Cruz, Oaxaca	Noticias Web	Killed (shot)	
24 February 2022	Jorge Luis Camero Zazueta	Empalme, Sonora	El Informativo	Killed (shot)	
4 March 2022	Juan Carlos Muñiz	Fresnillo, Zacatecas	Testigo Minero	Killed (shot)	
16 March 2022	Armando Linares	Zitácuaro, Michoacán	Monitor Michoacano	Killed (shot)	
5 May 2022	Luis Enrique Ramírez	Culiacán, Sinaloa	El Debate	Killed	
9 May 2022	Sheila Johana García Olivera	Cosoleacaque, Veracruz	El Veraz	Killed (shot)	
9 May 2022	Yessenia Mollinedo Falconi	Cosoleacaque, Veracruz	El Veraz	Killed (shot)	
29 June 2022	Antonio de la Cruz	Ciudad Victoria, Tamaulipas	Expreso	Killed (shot)	
4 August 2022	Ernesto Mendez	San Luis de la Paz, Guanajuato	Tu Voz	Killed (shot)	
2-16 August 2022	Juan Arjón López	San Luis Río Colorado, Sonora	A Qué Le Temes	Killed	(Note: It is unknown when he was killed. His last article was on 2 August, was publicly reported missing on 9 August and his corpse was found on 16 August.)
22 August 2022	Fredid Román	Chilpancingo, Guerrero	La Realidad, Vértice de Chilpancingo	Killed (shot)	
8 July 2023	Luis Martín Sánchez Íñiguez	Tepic, Nayarit	La Jornada	Killed	
15 July 2023	Nelson Matus Peña	Acapulco, Guerrero	Lo Real de Guerrero	Killed	
25 September 2023	Jesús Gutiérrez Vergara	San Luis Río Colorado, Sonora	Notiface	Killed	
26 April 2024	Roberto Carlos Figueroa	Cuernavaca, Mexico State	Acá en el Show	Killed	
28 June 2024	Víctor Alfonso Culebro Morales	Jiquipilas, Chiapas	Realidades	Killed	
4 August 2024	Alejandro Martínez Noguez	Celaya, Guanajuato	El Hijo del Llanero Solitito	Killed	
21 August 2024	Ariel Grajales Rodas	Villaflores, Chiapas	Villaflores.com.mx	Killed (shot)	

=== Presidency of Claudia Sheinbaum ===
Date	Name	Location	Media outlet	Status	Refs
29 October 2024	Mauricio Cruz Solís	Uruapan, Michoacán	Radiorama Michoacán; Minuto x Minuto	Killed	
30 October 2024	Patricia Ramírez González "Paty Bunbury"	Colima, Colima	Hechos	Killed	
17 January 2025	Calletano de Jesús Guerrero	Teoloyucan, Mexico State	Global Mexico	Killed (shot)	
24 January 2025	Alejandro Gallegos León	Cárdenas, Tabasco	La Voz del Pueblo	Killed	
2 March 2025	Kristian Zavala	Silao, Guanajuato	El Silaoense MX	Killed (shot)	
13 April 2025	Miguel Ángel Anaya	Pánuco, Veracruz	Pánuco Online	Disappeared	
14 May 2025	José Carlos González	Acapulco, Guerrero	El Guerrero, Opinión Ciudadana	Killed	
23 June 2025	Salomón Ordóñez Miranda	Cuetzalan, Mexico State	Shalom Cuetzalan Productions	Killed	
31 October 2025	Miguel Ángel Beltrán	Rio Chico, Durango	La Gazetta Dgo	Killed	
8 January 2026	Carlos Castro	Poza Rica, Veracruz	Código Norte Veracruz	Killed	
18 March 2026	Juan David Gámez	García, Nuevo León	Táctica SS	Killed	
2 June 2026	Roxana Berenice Guzmán Rodríguez	Nanchital, Veracruz	Pulso Informativo del Sureste	Killed	
11 June 2026	Luis Ángel López	Poza Rica, Veracruz	Vanguardia	Killed	
20 June 2026	Alex Serna	Zihuatanejo, Guerrero	Independent	Killed	
16 July 2026	Josué Martínez Contreras	San Martín Texmelucan, Puebla	Noticias San Martín Texmelucan	Killed (shot)	
23 July 2026	Francisco Alejandro Leyva	San Pablo Etla, Oaxaca	CorTV	Killed (shot)	
29 August 2026	Ricardo Zúñiga Rosas	Tehuitzingo, Puebla	Pinotepa Comunica	Killed (shot)	
9 October 2026	Hamurabi Huesca	Pinotepa Nacional, Oaxaca	Pinotepa Comunica	Killed (shot)	
14 November 2026	Eduardo Flores	Acapulco, Guerrero	Enfoque Informativo	Killed	

== See also ==
- Political murder
- List of journalists killed in Guatemala
- List of journalists killed in Honduras
- List of journalists killed in Venezuela
- List of politicians killed in the Mexican drug war
- Human rights in Mexico

== Sources ==
=== Bibliography ===
- Article 19 (1989). In the shadow of Buendia: the mass media and censorship in Mexico (2nd ed.). University of Michigan. p. 114. ISBN 978-1870798266.
- CNDH (September 1991). "Informe de la omisión Nacional de los Derechos Humanos sobre el programa de agravios a periodistas" (PDF). Comisión Nacional de los Derechos Humanos: 142. ISSN 0188-610X. Archived from the original (PDF) on 13 May 2012.
- CNDH2 (1990). Biannual Report. Mexico's Human Rights Commission. ISBN 9789688056370.
- Del Palacio, C., ed. (2015). Violencia y periodismo regional en México. Juan Pablos Editor. ISBN 978-607-9361-41-9.
- Edmonds-Poli, Emily; Cordell, Allison (April 2013). The Effects of Drug-War Related Violence on Mexico's Press and Democracy (PDF). Woodrow Wilson International Center for Scholars. p. 43. Archived from the original (PDF) on 23 July 2013.
- García Pérez, Guadalupe (1993). Agresiones a periodistas durante 1993 (PDF) (in Spanish). University of Guadalajara. p. 218. Archived (PDF) from the original on 18 June 2007.
- Holden, Robert H. (22 October 2012). Contemporary Latin America: 1970 to the Present. Wiley-Blackwell. p. 366. ISBN 978-1405139717.
- Hughes, Sallie (2006). Newsrooms in Conflict. Journalism and the Democratization of Mexico. University of Pittsburgh Press. p. 366. ISBN 9780822959281. Archived from the original on 11 May 2015.
- Lauría, Carlos (September 2010). Silence or Death in Mexico's Press (PDF). Committee to Protect Journalists. p. 51. Archived from the original (PDF) on 8 March 2013.
- Lawson, Chappell H. (2002). Building the Fourth Estate: Democratization and the Rise of a Free Press in Mexico. University of California Press. pp. 287. ISBN 978-0520231719. "PRI rule journalists mexico killed."
- Moncada, Carlos (1991). Del México Violento: Periodistas Asesinados (in Spanish). Edamex. p. 233. ISBN 978-9684095762.
- Moncada Ochoa, Carlos (2012). Oficio de muerte: periodistas asesinados en el país de la impunidad (in Spanish) (1 ed.). Penguin Random House. ISBN 978-6073113137.
- Poppa, Terrence E. (1998). Drug lord: the life and death of a Mexican kingpin: a true story (2nd ed.). Demand Publications. ISBN 978-0966443004. "Ezequiel Huerta Acosta."
- Rodelo, Frida V. (2009). "Journalism in violent environments: the case of journalists in Culiacan, Sinaloa". Comunicación y Sociedad (12): 101–118.
- Rodelo, Frida V. (2014). "Violaciones de la libertad de expresión de periodistas y trabajadores de medios en Jalisco, 1995–2013" (PDF). In Paláu C., M. M. (ed.). Medios de comunicación y derecho a la información en Jalisco 2013. Instituto Tecnológico y de Estudios Superiores de Occidente. pp. 95–112. ISBN 978-607-9361-41-9.
- Rojas Alba, Mario (1996). Las Manos Sucias: Violación a Los Derechos Humanos en México, 1988-1995. Grijalbo. p. 525. ISBN 978-9700506395.
- Standish, Peter (2004). Culture and Customs of Mexico. Greenwood Publishing Group. pp. 315. ISBN 978-0313304125. "PRI mexico journalists 1930s."
- UTPBA (1991). Informe regional, América Latina: Más de 500 periodistas asesinados en las últimas dos décadas (PDF) (in Spanish). Unión de Trabajadores de Prensa de Buenos Aires. p. 7. Archived (PDF) from the original on 17 August 2013.
- Warnock, John W. (1995). The other Mexico: the North American triangle completed. Black Rose Books. p. 321. ISBN 978-1551640280.
