= José Manuel Nava Sánchez =

Journalist

- Born: ca. 1954 (Age 52)
- Died: November 16, 2006; Mexico City, Mexico
- Cause of death: Murdered by stabbing
- Occupation: Journalist
- Years active: around 30 years
- Employer: El Sol de Mexico
- Known for: his work and leadership at Excélsior
- Title: Director

José Manuel Nava Sánchez (c. 1954 – 16 November 2006) was a veteran journalist and editor for the Excélsior newspaper, and columnist for the national daily El Sol de México. He was stabbed to death at his home in Mexico City in 2006.

== Career ==
José Manuel Nava Sánchez began his career in journalism at the Mexican news agency Notimex. Beginning in 1976, Nava became a reporter for the Mexico City-based daily Excélsior newspaper. Around 1982, he became Excélsior's Washington correspondent, a position he held for 22 years. He was directing editor of Excélsior from February 21, 2004 until December 2005. In September 2006, Nava began writing the daily column "Nuevo Poder" (Translated: New Power) for El Sol de México with a focus on political and social analysis.

Nava wrote several long-form books, such El Vortex del Mal. His last book was called Excélsior, el Asalto Final (Translated: "Excelsior, The Final Round"), which he published on November 6. It was a long-form work of investigative journalism that was critical of the roles various people and business played in selling the Excélsior newspaper and changing it from a cooperative.

== Death ==
He was killed in the capital of Mexico City.

Ten days following the publication of his book, 16 November 2006, a cleaning lady found the corpse of José Manuel Nava Sánchez in his apartment in Colonia Juárez, Cuauhtémoc, Mexico City. He had been stabbed to death with two wounds to his neck and chest sometime on night before he was found. Police suspected the murder was a robbery as his door showed signs of illegal entry and his personal computer was among the missing items.

== Context ==
In the month of November, three journalists were murdered, bringing the total number of in 2006 to seven. The murder of Roberto Marcos García followed Nava's by five days. According to Reporters Without Borders, this makes Mexico the second most dangerous country for journalists in the world beaten only by Iraq.

== Impact ==
The murders and disappearances of journalists have taken place within a context of impunity where little effort has been made to investigate these crimes and bring the perpetrators to justice, creating an atmosphere of fear that inhibits journalists from carrying out their jobs to the best of their abilities. For these reasons, IAPA has asked Felipe Calderon to bring an end to this impunity and to ensure that all crimes against journalists are thoroughly investigated. Human Rights House:

== Reactions ==
Mexico City authorities conducting an investigation into the murder said that they have not been able to determine a motive and do not have suspects in custody, according to the local press.

Joel Simon, executive director of the Committee to Protect Journalists, said, "We are shocked by the killing of our colleague, the fifth journalist murdered this year in Mexico. We urge Mexican authorities to conduct a thorough investigation into Nava's death." CPJ has confirmed that one of the five journalists killed this year was slain in connection with his reporting. It continues to investigate the killings of the four deaths.

== See also ==
- List of journalists killed in Mexico
