= Armando Saldaña Morales =

Mexican crime journalist and murder victim

- Born: ca. 1962
- Disappeared: May 2, 2015
- Died: May 4, 2015; Acatlan de Perez Figueroa, Oaxaca, Mexico
- Cause of death: Murder by gunfire
- Body discovered: May 4, 2015
- Occupation: Radio journalist
- Employer(s): "La Ke Buena 100.9 FM" and "Radio Max"
- Spouse: Maria Isabel Jasso Aguilar
- Relatives: Delfina Morales Saldaña, Sister

Armando Saldaña Morales (ca. 1962 – 4 May 2015) was a Mexican radio journalist for the radio stations La Ke Buena and Radio Max in Tierra Blanca, Veracruz, Mexico. He was abducted on 2 May 2015 and found dead two days later 350 kilometers southeast of Mexico City near the town of Acatlan de Perez Figueroa, Oaxaca. He had been reporting about organized crime involvement in petroleum from Pemex, the Mexican oil company.

== Personal ==
Armando Saldaña Morales grew up in the community of Laguna Chica, Veracruz, selling coffee. He married Maria Isabel Jasso, a nurse, from Tamaulipas. They lived together in his hometown of Laguna Chica where they raised their three daughters.

== Career ==
As a radio journalist, Saldaña hosted a political program, called "La Grilla Punto y Debate," on La Ke Buena 100.9 FM. and also was a writer for the local newspaper "Cronica de Tierra Blanca." In addition, Saldaña contributed to the media outlets El Mundo de Córdoba, El Sol de Cordoba, and Radio Max. He practiced journalism for 25 years.

== Death ==
Tierra Blanca, Laguna Chica (Veracruz) and Acatlan de Perez Figueroa (Oaxaca) are in Mexico and are shown relative to the capital Mexico City.

On 2 May 2015, Armando Morales Saldaña was kidnapped by a number of suspects after leaving work. He was last seen by his colleague Octavio Bravo Bravo in Veracruz. Although the motive for murder is unclear, he had reported about organized crimes by criminal parties over the course of the few months leading up to his murder. He most recently reported about the activities of a party known as "Chupaductos" that was tapping state-owned Pemex oil pipelines. An anonymous tip led authorities to Acatlan de Perez, Oaxaca, where he was found dead on 4 May 2015 He was found beside an F-150 pickup truck, and he had been shot 4 times and his body also showed signs of torture. His left cheekbone had been broken by stabs; his jugular was cut; his ear was cut off; his feet were burned and broken; and his mandible was shattered.

Police had to be requested to the area because it was remote. The area was also in another state where he was kidnapped. After the initial investigation and funeral, the family protested a number of irregularities in the collection of evidence.

On 22 May 2015, Juan Carlos de la Cruz was placed under arrest by the Agencia Estatal de Investigaciones. The suspect was formally charged on 27 May of participating in the murder. The Procuraduría General de Justicia del Estado de Oaxaca (PGJEO) is working to find the other participants of this murder.

== Context ==
According to Reporters Without Borders, Mexico has been ranked 148th out of 180 countries in regards to press freedom. There have been 82 journalists murdered in Mexico in the last 20 years, and the state of Veracruz in which Morales lived and work is considered to be the most dangerous state for journalists ton live in.

Morales was the third journalist in 2015 to be murdered. Since Governor Javier Duarte took office in 2010, 12 journalists have been murdered; also, in 2014 about 326 journalists were harmed due to their profession.

Crimes related to oil thefts such as those Morales was reporting about are also not uncommon in Mexico with as much revenue as $1.14 billion having been lost to oil theft in 2014. This increase in petroleum theft led to a growth in security of 122% from 2006 to 2013 at an expense of 299 million pesos.

== Impact ==
Morales was one of twelve reporters to have been murdered in Veracruz since the appointment of Governor Javier Duarte has taken office. despite the many deaths that have occurred, the federal prosecutors office that is meant to protect journalists has not been able to convict a single suspect for the murder of any journalists. The death of Morales and the many other Mexican journalists, especially those working in Veracruz, raise concern for the safety of journalists and for the freedom of speech of the people as well.

== Reactions ==
In a response to Morales' death, the National Human Rights Commission (Comisión Nacional de los Derechos Humanos) contacted Morales' family and formally condemned the attack and murder of Morales on 7 May 2015.

Irina Bokova, director-general of UNESCO, said "I condemn the murder of Armando Saldaña Morales and call on the authorities to conduct a thorough investigation into this murder. Crimes against journalists affect the whole of society and limit our ability as citizens to make informed choices. For this reason, it is essential that such crimes do not go unpunished."

Gustavo Mohme, the president of Inter American Press Association (SIP-IAPA), said, "We are facing another murder that could run the risk of being without justice, unpunished like so many other cases in Mexico...."

== See also ==
- List of journalists and media workers killed in Mexico
