= Juan Carlos Muñiz =

Mexican journalist and murder victim

- Born: c. 1984
- Died: 4 March 2022 (aged 37); Fresnillo, Zacatecas, Mexico
- Cause of death: Gunshot wounds
- Occupation: Journalist
- Organization: Testigo Minero

Juan Carlos Muñiz (c. 1984 – 4 March 2022) was a Mexican journalist who covered crimes for the website Testigo Minero. He was the seventh journalist to be murdered in Mexico in 2022.

== Biography ==
Muñiz studied journalism at the Autonomous University of Fresnillo. He was a crime writer and Muñiz was shot and killed while riding home from work in a taxi for reporting on a recent crime in the city of Fresnillo. His death shocked the state of Zacatecas, and mobilized people to protest his death.

The killing of Juan Carlos Muñiz was condemned by the Director-General of the UNESCO Audrey Azoulay in a press-release published on 14 March 2022. According to global monitoring on the safety of journalists by the Observatory of Killed journalist, Muñiz is the 6th media professional killed in Mexico in 2022.

== See also ==
- Mexican drug war
- List of journalists killed in Mexico
