= Alberto López Bello =

Mexican crime journalist

Cristian Alberto López Bello
- Born: ca. 1985
- Died: July 17, 2013 (aged 28); Trinidad de Viguera, a town near the southern city of Oaxaca.
- Cause of death: Beaten and shot to death
- Body discovered: His body was discovered along with the corpse of Arturo Alejandro Franco Rojas, who worked police intelligence.
- Resting place: Panteón General, Oaxaca, Mexico; 17°4′0″N 96°43′13″W
- Occupation: Journalist
- Years active: Six years
- Employer(s): El Imparcial of Oaxaca (newspaper) and "Foro Político" (radio program)
- Known for: crime reporting
- Style: Investigative journalism
- Children: three

Cristián Alberto López Bello (c. 1985 – 17 July 2013) was a crime journalist for the Mexican newspaper El Imparcial and the radio show "Foro Político", in Oaxaca, Mexico. The murder of López was an early case that tested the new powers of federal special prosecutors to investigate crimes against Mexican journalists and freedom of expression. The federal special prosecutor, however, deferred to the Attorney General of Oaxaca, who said three and a half months after the López murder that the motive was a bar fight, announced the arrest of four people, and then resigned the next day. The family publicly disagreed with the official conclusion.

== Personal ==
Alberto López Bello was the son of former newspaper journalist Alberto López Cruz, who worked for Noticias y Extra de Oaxaca. He was 28 years old at the time of his murder and himself a father of three children. He lived with his wife and family in San Martín Mexicapan, Oaxaca, Mexico His funeral mass was conducted at the San Felipe Neri Catholic church. He was laid to rest at Panteón General in Oaxaca.

== Career ==
Alberto López Bello was a journalist for the newspaper El Imparcial out of Oaxaca where he published articles about crime and drug dealing while working on the police beat for six years. He also reported about local crimes for a radio show called “Foro Político" for Radiorama.

== Death ==
Trinidad de Viguera is south of Oaxaca, Mexico. Both cities are shown relative to the capital Mexico City.

In the early morning hours before he was found dead, Alberto López Bello and a man were seen at a bar on Morelos Street in Cielito Lindo, the historic center of Oaxaca, talking to a group of four men, and a fight ensued after they had spoken. This interaction was picked up by surveillance cameras. Using this as evidence, investigators were able to identify the four men later.

The bodies of journalist Alberto López Bello and police intelligence officer Arturo Alejandro Franco Rojas were discovered around 7:00 a.m., Wednesday, 17 July 2013 on Sabino Street in the area of Los Humedales (or La Humedad) in the city of Trinidad de Viguera south of Oaxaca. The officer was later identified as an informant of the Commissioner of Security Public and Municipal Transit. The two men were shot, beaten and stoned to death sometime after López left work 16 July and the next morning. López had written about the drug trade before his murder. The state police reported that it had briefly detained López and a professional colleague May 18 after discovering them taking photographs of a message on a blanket left by a drug cartel but released them after checking their press credentials. According to the Inter American Press Association and Reporters Without Borders, López had been threat before. Many press freedom organizations suspected that López's murder was related to drug cartel violence, however, experts on drug violence were said that the cartels typically leave their sign or message near the bodies and that was not the case in this double murder. Early in the investigations authorities said they did not know of any connection between the policeman and the journalist.

== Investigation ==
Governor Gabino Cue Monteagudo requested that the investigation be sent to the Special Bureau of Attention to Journalists as a "high impact" case under the new laws. Oaxacan city officials swiftly handed the case over to the federal level in hopes of implementing the new laws of allowing more authority to prosecutors in cases against journalist.

The Oaxaca office of the Attorney General released its report 6 November 2013. The report concluded López and the police officer had been killed over a bar room fight and the motive was not related to journalism. The Attorney General announced the arrest of Julián Ramírez Benítez, Gerardo García Flores, Rafael Martínez González and Aldo José Luis Tenorio Benítez and two others connected to organized crime. The special prosecutor's office deferred to the state's report. The Oaxacan prosecutor Manuel de Jesús López then resigned 7 November 2013 after having left the case open. Alberto López Bello's family disputed the Attorney General's conclusion, pointed to faults in the investigation, and charged the government was protecting López's murderers.

== Context ==
Alberto López Bello was not the first El Imparcial journalist to be killed as three others from the newspaper were killed in 2007. Journalists were killed with impunity in the last five cases of journalist murders in the state of Oaxaca and yet the levels of violence have been lower in Oaxaca than elsewhere. Two others Mexican journalists were killed in 2013 before Alberto López Bello. Over the past decade, press freedom and human rights organizations had monitored the killing or forced disappearance of between 88 and 84 Mexican journalists at the time of López's murder, while the Committee to Protect Journalists had confirmed 57 and four of those during President Enrique Peña Nieto's term. While the number of journalist deaths in Mexico have decreased in comparison to 2012, Article 19 reported that violence against the nation's media has increased 46 percent in 2013.

== Impact ==
A new law was passed in Mexico May 2012 that gave more authority to special federal prosecutors to investigate and prosecute acts of violence against journalists. López was the second journalist to be murdered since the new law has been enacted. The first journalist covered by the law was Mario Chávez Jorge who disappeared 24 May 2012 and whose body was discovered 10 June 2012.

== Reactions ==
After the murder of Alberto López Bello, the United Nations, international and regional press freedom NGOs and his newspaper demanded an investigation that would lead to prosecution. El Imparcial released the following statement, "We urge the authorities to investigate as soon as possible this crime, which demonstrates the vulnerability journalists face daily in their work to provide accurate and timely information to citizens."

The Observatory of Public Communication Processes of Violence demanded an immediate, full and effective investigation into López's murder that would answer whether his murder was connected to his professional duties. The Inter American Press Association organization requested a full investigation with the broad federal powers available to be used in the investigation. The committee to Protect Journalists said, "Crime reporters in Mexico work at enormous risk, constantly facing threats, intimidation, and attacks that are virtually never punished," Carlos Lauría, CPJ's senior program coordinator for the Americas, said from New York. "The cycle of impunity in anti-press crimes has had a devastating effect on the public's right to information, especially on matters of crime and corruption. The government can begin to break this terrible cycle by fully investigating this crime." Reporters Without Borders said, "We pay tribute to López, whose death is another reminder of the dangers to which reporters and news media are exposed when they try to cover sensitive subjects such as drug trafficking. We also salute the courage of the management of López’s newspaper, who have said they are determined to continue providing news and information, despite the acts of intimidation and the tragedies they frequently encounter."

Irina Bokova, director-general of UNESCO, said, "This killing must be investigated thoroughly as part of the endeavour to stem violence against the media in Mexico. I trust that no effort will be spared to improve the safety of journalists seeking to carry out their professional obligation to keep the public informed."

== See also ==
- Mexican drug war
- List of journalists killed in Mexico
