= Adrián Gaona =

Mexican journalist and radio announcer

Adrián Gaona Belmonte (5 August 1975 – c. 16 August 2014) was a Mexican journalist and radio announcer who was murdered in 2014.

He was the sixth journalist to be killed in Mexico in 2014.

== Early life and education ==
Gaona was born on August 5, 1975, and was graduated from Universidad Mexicoamericana del Norte (UMAN).

== Career ==
In 1998 he started working as a journalist at Multimedios Estrellas de Oro. He also worked for a group of Tamaulipas radio stations called Producciones González, and broadcast regularly on La Caliente 93.1 FM, based in Reynosa.

== Disappearance and death ==
Gaona disappeared on August 13. His family assumed he had been kidnapped but instead of going to the authorities decided to wait to hear from the kidnappers. But they never did.

On August 16, members of the Navy found two murdered bodies in a vacant lot, in a place called Ejido Las Anacuas, on the outskirts of Reynosa, Tamaulipas, near the city dump. Both bodies were taken to the morgue at the General Hospital in Reynosa and remained unidentified for several days. Gaona's family filed a missing-persons report on August 25, and shortly thereafter identified one of the bodies found on August 16 as that of Gaona, and the other as that of a friend of Gaona's, Javier Barraza Vázquez, age 48, who was a taxi driver.

According to one source, Gaona was kidnapped and murdered by local gangsters. The Gulf Cartel, a criminal organization with operations in Reynosa, denied responsibility for the killings.

It was reported on 1 September that the National Human Rights Commission (CNDH) had launched an investigation into Gaona's death. Dora Maria Morales stated in an article that Gaona's murder had caused "a strong sense of indignation" among journalists in Tamaulipas.

== See also ==
- List of journalists killed in Mexico
