= Jesús Adrián Rodríguez Samaniego =

- Born: June 3, 1975; Chihuahua City, Chihuahua, Mexico
- Died: December 10, 2016 (aged 41); Chihuahua City, Chihuahua, Mexico
- Cause of death: Gun shot
- Burial place: Chihuahua City, Mexico
- Occupations: Print and radio journalist
- Years active: 15 years
- Employer(s): Antena 102.5 FM & El Heraldo de Chihuahua
- Known for: Crime reporting

Jesús Adrián Rodríguez Samaniego (June 3, 1975 – December 10, 2016) was a Mexican radio journalist for the Antena 102.5 FM and a former crime reporter for the Organización Editorial Mexicana newspaper El Heraldo de Chihuahua, was murdered on December 10, 2016, in Chihuahua City, Chihuahua, Mexico. Reporters stated a possible motive for the murder may have been Rodríguez's investigation into the 2013 jailing of two brothers from the northern Mexican state of Sinaloa. This case was the 11th murder in Mexico of a journalist in 2016, the year with the highest number recorded.

== Personal ==
Samaniego was born in 1975 in Chihuahua, Mexico. Samaniego lived with his girlfriend and his two daughters in the Chihuahua City's Santa Rosa neighborhood.

== Career ==
Samaniego was a radio journalist for the Antena 102.5 FM, a local radio station owned by the GRD Multimedia, and former crime reporter for the newspaper El Heraldo de Chihuahua in Chihuahua City, Chihuahua, Mexico. For more than 15 years he collaborated with various local media, such as being a reporter for the police section of the newspaper El Heraldo de Chihuahua. Every Saturday he participated in the Reporters' Desk program at the station where he worked.

== Death ==
Mentioned locations within Mexico relative to the capital Mexico City.

Jesus Adrian Rodriguez Samaniego was killed at point-blank range outside his home located in the Santa Rosa neighborhood of Chihuahua City at around 7:30 a.m. Samaniego was getting into his Tsuru model car to head to an event called, "Mesa de Reporteros," a weekly Saturday radio talk show. Two unknown men drove by and shot him at least 8 times with .45 caliber rounds. Samaniego was killed instantly on the scene. For some days he had been investigating a delicate case of two people arrested on charges allegedly obtained under torture, inflicted by agents of the public prosecutor's office. No reports were found with any possible suspects.

== Context ==
Samaniego's murder is still being investigated, but reports stated that there was not any particular threats before the events occurred. El Heraldo de Chihuahua reported that one possible motive for the murder may have been Rodríguez's investigation into the 2013 jailing of two brothers from the northern Mexican state of Sinaloa. As of December 2016, the men were held as suspects in a July 2009 attack on a government convoy that killed two policemen and an official of the federal Social Development Secretariat. Reporters Without Borders ranks Mexico as the deadliest country for journalists in the Western Hemisphere. In addition, since 2000, ARTICLE 19 has documented 100 homicides of journalists, of which 12 were registered in Chihuahua.

== Impact ==
Jesús Adrián Rodríguez Samaniego was only one of several journalists who have been murdered in reaction to their job. Since there has already been 12 murders registered in Chihuahua since 2000, the ARTICLE 19 directs the Attorney General of the State of Chihuahua to carry out an impartial, diligent investigation and with strict adherence to legality taking into account as its main line of investigation its journalistic exercise. It also requires the Protection Mechanism for Human Rights Defenders and the state government of Chihuahua to implement all necessary measures to safeguard the life, liberty and integrity of the journalist's family and ensure the effectiveness of the early warning implemented by both Prevent attacks on journalists in the entity.

== Reactions ==
Irina Bokova, director-general of UNESCO, said, "I condemn the murder of Jesús Adrián Rodríguez Samaniego, I call on the authorities to investigate this crime and bring its perpetrators to justice. Society as a whole must take responsibility for the safety of journalists on whom everyone depends to sustain informed public debate. Violence cannot be allowed to curb the fundamental human right of freedom of expression and freedom of information."

A representative of the Office in Mexico of the United Nations High Commissioner for Human Rights issued the following statement: "This attack must be properly investigated, exhausting all lines of investigation, including those related to the journalistic activity of Mr. Rodriguez Samaniego. Not only those directly responsible for his homicide should be brought to justice, but also the intellectual authors, if any. No attack on the media or journalists should go unpunished."

"Reporters Without Borders expresses its shock at this new crime and offers its full support to the family of Adrián Rodríguez as well as his fellow journalists," says Emmanuel Colombié, head of RSF's Latin America Office. "Mexico has just experienced a dramatic year in terms of journalistic union security, it is time to establish reliable protection mechanisms in the most violent states of the country, where the press is systematically targeted when it is interested in corruption and organized crime."

== See also ==
- List of journalists and media workers killed in Mexico
