= Elidio Ramos Zárate =

Mexican crime reporter

- Born: c. 1971/72; Tamaulipas, Mexico
- Died: June 19, 2016; Juchitán, Oaxaca, Mexico
- Cause of death: Gunshot
- Other name: Guillermo Parie
- Occupation: Crime reporter
- Years active: 10 years
- Employer: El Sur
- Known for: Reporting crimes

Elidio Ramos Zárate, also known by his pen name Guillermo Parie, (c. 1971/72 – June 19, 2016), a Mexican crime reporter for the daily newspaper El Sur in Istmo de Tehuantepec, a region within the state of Oaxaca, Mexico, was shot and killed alongside another innocent bystander in the midst of a teachers protest organized by the Coordinadora Nacional de Trabajadores de la Educación in Juchitán de Zaragoza.

== Personal ==
Elidio Ramos Zárate was born in Mexico around 1971 or 1972. Police noted that Ramos was a relative of a known figure inside the underworld known as "El Fayo."

== Career ==
Elidio Ramos Zárate worked for El Sur for 10 years as a crime journalist before he was killed. Ramos worked in a popular genre of sensationalist, tabloid style of crime journalism known in Mexico as nota roja. He was assigned to cover the protest by the CNTE, who were protesting the government. Although he was a known crime reporter in the region, Ramos was not, according to his editor, threatened before he covered the CNTE protests. His editor said, "As a journalist, in this area and in these situations, you are extra exposed. We're not safe from anyone. Sometimes it's the protesters, other times the police, other times criminals, like now."

== Death ==
Mentioned locations within Mexico relative to the capital Mexico City.

The teachers' union CNTE organized protests across Oaxaca to protest against charges against union leaders and education policy changes involving the evaluations of teachers. A day before Ramos was killed, masked men at the protest threatened him, as well as other journalists taking photos of vandals in Juchitán, Oaxaca, Mexico.

The next day, on June 19, 2016, violence between the police and protesters erupted, and, as a result, eight protesters were killed, a bus was burned, more than 100 police and protesters were injured, and over 20 people were arrested. Ramos was photographed multiple times posing in front of a burning bus.

The fatal attack on Ramos occurred several hours after he had finished reporting on the main protest site at Asunción Nochixtlán, on a major road that connected Oaxaca to Mexico City, and the burning bus that had been set on fire by the protesters. During the protests, looting and vandalism around the city occurred, and Ramos happened to observe and photograph one of the four OXXO convenience stores looted that day as it was being looted. Elidio Ramos Zárate was shot in the neck by two unknown men on foot or on motorcycles outside of the OXXO with 9 mm caliber firearm and killed around 4 p.m. His body was found on a park bench across the street from the OXXO about a quarter of a mile from the protest.

The killers also shot and wounded two people around Ramos. Raúl Cano López, who was the brother of an owner of another regional newspaper Punto Crítico, was also shot in the attack but died in the ambulance en route to the hospital. Cano happened to be on the bench at the bus stop at the time. The other person, who was unidentified in reports, was also at the bus stop and wounded in the attack. The wounded were taken to the Macedonio Benitez Fuentes special hospital.

No suspects have been charged with the murder but the investigation is ongoing.

== Context ==
President Enrique Peña Nieto's government had recently charged two union leaders with embezzlement and was attempting to change the evaluation of teachers, while at the state level in Oaxaca over 4,000 teachers were on lay off. The protest was organized by the CNTE teachers union in response. The battle over education reform in this southern state in Mexico has been ongoing for almost 10 years in Oaxaca and previous demonstrations had also led to violence.

== Reactions ==
Aurelio Nuño, Mexico's Secretary of Education, held a meeting after the shooting. He said future meetings will resolve around peace and nothing else.

Irina Bokova, director-general of UNESCO said, "I condemn the killing of Elidio Ramos Zárate. Serving as the eyes and ears of society, journalists must be able to carry out their important work without fearing for their lives. It is therefore important that those responsible for this crime be brought to justice."

A spokesperson from Reporters Without Borders said, "We urge the authorities to conduct exhaustive investigations into these fatal shootings and under no circumstances to rule out the possibility that they were linked to the victims' work as a journalists."

Ivonne Flores, a reporter for El Sur, complained about the working conditions in the state of Oaxaca and stated that reporters are unable to do their work and cover material as it should be covered because of the dangers that come with their career.

== See also ==
- List of journalists and media workers killed in Mexico
- 2006 Oaxaca protests
