= Valentín Valdés Espinosa =

Mexican crime journalist and murder victim

- Died: 8 January 2010; Saltillo, Mexico
- Occupation: Print Reporter

Valentín Valdés Espinosa (1981? – 8 January 2010), a Mexican journalist for the newspaper Zócalo in Saltillo, Mexico. He was 29 years old when he was murdered and was the third journalist killed in the Mexican drug war in less than three weeks in the northern states of Mexico

His murder was reported by major news organizations who said his death could be seen as part of a sustained strategy by drug cartels, in this case the Zetas, to intimidate the press into silence.

== Death ==
Valentín Valdés Espinosa was leaving work on 7 January 2010 around midnight with two colleagues. They were cut off by several men in SUVs. Valdès and another colleague were kidnapped while one other journalist was left behind. The next day Valdés' body was found in front of a local Motel Marbella bound and shot five times. There was a handwritten note found with his body, which is a sign that drug gangs were involved, saying: "This is going to happen to those who don't understand. The message is for everyone." The other kidnapped journalist was released. His co-workers say he was most likely killed because of a story he did prior to his death on 29 December 2009. The story was about the Zetas drug cartel leader being arrested at Motel Marbella along with a police officer who was being paid off by the group.

=== Context ===
Saltillo is the capital of Coahuila, a state in Mexico and it is 869 km from Mexico City. Saltillo has a large well-known drug cartel group called the Zetas. The Zetas cartel is one of the most powerful and violent cartels in Mexico. They control shipments of cocaine, marijuana, and other drugs into the United States In the last four years, around 35,000 drug associated killings have taken place in Mexico, and of those 659 have happened in the state of Coahulia, while 3 percent of those have happened in Saltillo.

On a Sunday, 29 May 2011, the offices of the Vanguardia of Satillo were attacked with a grenade by drug cartels. It was the 7th attack on a press building and the 22 incident against the media, which includes the murder of Valentín Valdés Espinosa.

This type of violence against journalists and media outlets had been a motive for the most major news outlets to develop and sign a set of industry guidelines about how to report in the drug war. The major points included not publishing the types of messages that drug gangs leave on the bodies of their victims and to treat it as propaganda and the glorification of violence.

=== Reactions ===
Zócalo de Saltillo editor Sergio Cisneros declined to pursue the death of his reporter further as he said nothing would come out of it, which illustrates the problem of impunity that journalists face in Mexico.

== Career ==
He had worked for Zócalo de Saltillo for a year and a half.

== See also ==
- Mexican drug war
- List of journalists killed in Mexico
