= René Orta Salgado =

Mexican lawyer, journalist and activist

- Born: ca. 1969
- Disappeared: Cuernavaca, Morelos, Mexico
- Died: May 13, 2012 (Age 43); Cuernavaca, Morelos (state), Mexico
- Cause of death: Asphyxia and strangulation
- Occupations: Journalist and political activist
- Years active: around 20 years
- Employer: El Sol de Cuernavaca
- Organization: Emprendedores por la Nación (Translated: Entrepreneurs for the Nation)
- Political party: Institutional Revolutionary Party (PRI)

René Orta Salgado (c. 1969 – May 13, 2012) was former Mexican journalist, lawyer, and political activist for the Institutional Revolutionary Party (PRI). He was killed in Cuernavaca, Morelos, Mexico, during an election season in 2012, but the murder could have been linked to his past in journalism and the Mexican drug war.

== Personal ==
Renee Orta Salgado, 43, killed on May 13, 2012. He had two children with his first wife and a girlfriend.

== Career ==
René Orta Salgado was a former reporter with around 20 years of experience in journalism who had first worked for Periódico Opción and then for the El Sol de Cuernavaca, a Mario Vazquez Rana owned-newspaper. While working as a reporter, he was able to earn his law degree. After leaving his journalism job December 2011 for law, he became the Morelos state coordinator for the political group Emprendedores Por la Nacion (Translated: Entrepreneurs for the Nation), which is affiliated with the national association and a group that supported Enrique Peña Nieto of the PRI for an upcoming presidential election.

== Death ==
Mentioned locations within Mexico relative to the capital Mexico City.

René Orta Salgado was last seen talking to people at a local bar late Friday and early Saturday morning. Orta's family first reported him missing Saturday, May 12, 2012, and the search began after noon. The next day, Orta's corpse was found at 4 p.m. stuffed in his gray Nissan Murano car trunk on Del Hueso street, in the Buena Vista neighborhood of Cuernavaca. His corpse showed signs from beatings, stab wounds, as well as signs being choked to death, but no gunshot wounds. The vehicle in which his body was found also showed no signs of bullet wounds or struggle. No message was found near the killing, which is a typical sign of a drug-related crime. The official cause of death was from stabbing, asphyxia, and strangulation.

== Context ==
Around the time Orta was appointed state coordinator for the Emprendedores Por la Nacion, the PRI party had won an important election in the state of Mexico around Mexico City. Orta was killed a month and a half before the July 1 general election of 2012 between PRI candidate Enrique Peno Nieto and President Felipe Calderón's successor. It was an election seen as a test of Calderon's drug war policies. The PRI party in Congress had thwarted Calderon's effort to recreate the police force after police corruption was exposed.

== Impact ==
There were two other attacks around the same time as Orta's murder and four other murders the previous month. Mexico's National Human Rights Commission says attacks on journalists "are systematic in Mexico" and the issue gets little attention, with inadequate justice in cases involving attacks or abuses of power against journalists. A group of four experts from the United Nations and the Inter-American Commission on Human Rights, asked the government on May 14, 2012, to stop impunity on murders of journalists. The panel asked that Mexico go ahead with implementing the Law for the Protection of Human Rights Defenders and Journalists, a bill that would strengthen prosecution for attacks on media workers. The panel does not expect the bill to solve the issue, but does believe it to be a step in the right direction.

== Reactions ==
René Orta Salgado was killed a day before a UN meeting about impunity. Margaret Sekaggya, the UN Special Rapporteur, said, "Human rights defenders in Mexico desperately need the State's effective protection now. They continue to suffer killings, attacks, harassment, threats, stigmatization and other serious human rights violations." PEN also joined in the UN's statement and called upon Mexican states to ratify the new law. Mexican journalists met for a moment of silence to remember him and other journalists whose cases have ended in impunity.

Journalists from around the country signed a petition that his murder be investigated. Five days after his murder, the National Commission on Human Rights began its investigation of his murder.

Orta was also killed during an election process and the coalition for PRI released a statement, "We demand that authorities thoroughly investigate this crime until it is solved, so that this crime does not go unpunished and the person or persons responsible will be punished to the full extent of the law."

== See also ==
- Mexican drug war
- List of journalists killed in Mexico
