= Pablo Pineda Gaucín =

Mexican crime journalist and photographer and murder victim

- Born: c. 1961
- Disappeared: Matamoros, Tamaulipas, Mexico
- Died: 9 April 2000 (aged 39)
- Cause of death: Gunshot wound
- Body discovered: Los Indios, Texas, U.S.

Pablo Pineda Gaucín (c. 1961 – 9 April 2000) was a Mexican crime reporter and photographer for La Opinión, a newspaper in the border city of Matamoros, Tamaulipas, Mexico.

Known for his direct reporting, Pineda Gaucín was subject to several attacks from alleged drug traffickers. In the last attack, unidentified suspects took him by force on 9 April 2000, brutally tortured him, and shot him execution-style, leaving his body on the bank of the Rio Grande. The crime, however, remains unsolved.

== Early life and career ==
Pineda Gaucín was born in Torreón, Coahuila, earned a Bachelor's degree in Accounting, and worked in the local government of Matamoros before becoming a journalist. He turned to journalism and worked as a reporter and photographer for La Opinión, an editorial from the Mexican city of Matamoros, Tamaulipas. He usually covered incidents involving car accidents, suicide, rape, drug trafficking, and political corruption. Pineda Gaucín was locally recognized for his direct style in reporting.

During Pineda Gaucín's tenure as a journalist, Hugo Baldomero Medina Garza was the top drug baron of the Gulf Cartel in Matamoros, along with Juan Nepomuceno Guerra. For his coverage on drug trafficking and political corruption, Pineda Gaucín was subject to intimidation from crooked authorities and drug traffickers.

=== Organized crime accusations ===
Although his criminal record was clean, Pineda Gaucín was suspected by other journalists of having links with organized crime. One reporter from a local newspaper in Matamoros said that the way Pineda Gaucín was killed was unusual, and concluded that he was killed "...like drug traffickers kill each other." Others allege that he received large sums of money from politicians to avoid writing about certain people.

However, the Committee to Protect Journalists and the authorities in Mexico and the United States maintain that they have no criminal records of Pineda Gaucín, and that the accusations are false, probably created by drug traffickers to discredit him.

== Attacks ==
=== Assassination attempts ===
In 1996, Pineda Gaucín was attacked by several unidentified men with sticks outside the Lozano funeral parlor in Matamoros. He also repeatedly received threats on the phone. His wife Rosi Solís recalls that "Whenever [they] went out on the street, people would tell him, 'Watch out, Pineda!' ..."

On 21 October 1999, Pineda Gaucín survived an attack at his home in the Valle Alto neighborhood of Matamoros, Tamaulipas. According to police reports, armed men opened fire at him nine times but only one bullet scraped his arm, while the others hit the wall of his house and automobile. Pineda Gaucín claimed that he knew who the shooter was, and said he was convinced that the drug lord Roberto Torres Torres, known as "El Muertero", had ordered the failed assassination attempt, in retaliation for Pineda's extensive coverage of the drug lord's arrest in one of his newspaper columns. Torres Torres had been arrested days earlier but was taken to a hospital after suffering from embolism. When he was being transported from the prison to the hospital, Pineda Gaucín manage to take several pictures of him and published them. This supposedly incurred Torres Torres's wrath and prompted the assassination attempt.

After the attack, a colleague of Pineda Gaucín recalled that he went to the hospital where Torres Torres was being treated and threatened him. Two days later, Héctor Fernando Torres de la Garza, the man who allegedly carried out the assassination attempt against Pineda Gaucín, was found dead outside a shopping center in Matamoros. Rumors spread that Pineda Gaucín had ordered the death of the assailant. However, he was never interrogated and three other men were arrested for the crime. After the attack, his wife recalled that he had changed a lot, would no longer get in fights with her, and even made funeral arrangements.

=== Assassination ===
One of the last persons to see Pineda Gaucín alive was Martín Castillo, another crime reporter who said his colleague had left work after receiving a phone call the night of 8 April 2000. Pineda Gaucín said to Castillo that he would return soon because he had to finish editing some photographs for his newspaper column, and departed in his Grand Marquis 92. Someone else saw him that same night covering a police disarmament in the rural community of Estación Ramírez. On his way back to the city, the authorities believe he was ambushed and forcibly taken by suspected drug traffickers.

At around 2:45 a.m. on 9 April 2000, in the town of Los Indios, Texas just across the US–Mexico border, US Border Patrol officers found Pineda Gaucín's corpse. His body was found with his hands wrapped behind his back and with a plastic bag on the head. He also bore a bullet wound from a 9mm pistol and showed signs of being tortured before he was executed. The agents said that they saw two automobiles parked near the Rio Grande at 2:30 a.m. and noticed three people carrying something over their shoulders. They decided to wait and not intervene immediately because they thought the men were carrying narcotics across the border. The bag containing Pineda Gaucín's body was dumped at the river bank and was later recovered by the authorities.

The motives behind Pineda Gaucín assassination are still unclear and the case is still open, but "the killing bore all the hallmarks of the drug traffickers."

==== Funeral ====
After the body of Pineda Gaucín was discovered on the riverbank of the Rio Grande in Texas, his remains was repatriated to Mexico on 10 April 2000. His family held a wake at the Lozano funeral home and later buried him in the Jardín cemetery in the city of Matamoros.

==== Investigation ====
Since the U.S. authorities confirmed that Pineda Gaucín was killed in Mexico before his body made it to the shore bordering Texas, they concluded that the Mexican authorities were responsible for carrying out the investigation. When Pineda Gaucín was abducted, there were no eyewitnesses, and the authorities in Mexico only managed to recover the Grand Marquis he was driving. On the other hand, his family did not file a formal complaint for his death; under Mexican law, investigating a homicide does not require a formal complaint, but the Matamoros police claimed that the investigation had "gone as far as it [could]." Prior to his death, Pineda Gaucín told his wife that if he were to be killed in the future, she should not consult the police or file a report, stating:

"If anything happens to me, don't go to the police, because they'll never pay any attention to you ... I have upset a lot of people. Just rely on God and divine justice and don't do anything at the prosecutor’s office."

— Pineda Gaucín

== See also ==
- Mexican drug war
- List of journalists killed in Mexico
