= Norberto Miranda Madrid =

Mexican editor and radio show host (1965–2009)

- Born: ca. 1965; Nuevo Casas Grandes, Chihuahua, Mexico
- Died: 23 September 2009 (Age 44); Nuevo Casas Grandes, Chihuahua, Mexico
- Cause of death: Gunshot wounds
- Other name: El Gallito
- Occupations: Editor and columnist
- Years active: 20
- Employer: Radio Visión
- Known for: his column "Cotorreando con El Gallito" (which translates as "Chatting with the Tough Guy")
- Political party: Party of the Democratic Revolution
- Website: www.radiovisioncasasgrandes.com

Norberto Miranda Madrid, (c. 1965 – 23 September 2009), also known as "El Gallito" (Translated: "Little Rooster" or "Tough Guy"), was a Mexican editor, radio show host and online columnist for Radio Visión in Nuevo Casas Grandes, Chihuahua state, northern Mexico. He was targeted in the workplace by the Juárez Cartel in an attack at the radio because of his reporting on an affiliated group's campaign of violence in the area.

According to Reporters Without Borders, Miranda was an outspoken, unwavering journalist who was targeted for his reports on the drug war at a time when the Sinaloa and Juárez cartels were battling for control over the northwestern states of Mexico, including Chihuahua, and the federal government was waging a war on those same cartels, which aggravated cartel violence against civilians and journalists. The international press freedom organization noted Miranda was one of 55 journalists killed in the Mexican drug war between 2000 and 2009.

== Personal ==
Miranda Madrid had been a congressional candidate for the Party of the Democratic Revolution (PRD) in the 2007 election. Miranda's brother, José, was a Radio Visión staffer and while present at Radio Visión during the shooting, he was unharmed.

== Career ==
Miranda Madrid was a veteran journalist with over 20 years of experience. Before working at Radio Visión, Miranda Madrid was a radio announcer for La Ranchera de Paquimé AM and La Sabrosita. He was also a reporter for the newspaper El Heraldo de Chihuahua.

Miranda Madrid cultivated a reputation while at Radio Visión of being a fearless radio journalist who was never afraid to report the facts, and he used his radio program to report on the atrocities committed by the drug cartels. He wrote a regular column called "Cotorreando con El Gallito". Mexico's large circulation newspaper El Universal published an excerpt of his reporting on 22 September 2009 where he talked about the culture of fear and about the public's need to know the objective facts of a drug war where the cycle of murder was escalating.

== Death ==
Mentioned locations within Mexico relative to the capital Mexico City.

On 23 September 2009, five masked gunmen entered the Radio Visión facility and directed gun fire at Miranda. Miranda was hit multiple times in the back of the neck and he was shot until he was dead. The attackers then escaped. The attack occurred around 10:20 p.m. in Nuevo Casas Grandes, Mexico.

Prior to his death, Miranda had received several death threats in response of his coverage of the capture early in September of members of La Línea, a commando group affiliated with the Juárez drug cartel (which was battling the Sinaloa Cartel for control of Chihuahua state). One of the captured members of the group included Jose Rodolfo Escajeda, who was responsible for the kidnap and murder of Mormon anti-crime activist Benjamin LeBaron and Luis Carlos Whitman on 7 July 2009.

== Context ==
In the year leading up to Miranda Madrid's murder, around 1,600 people were killed in Ciudad Juarez, which is considered to be the most violent city in Mexico. Prosecutor Patricia Gonzalez blamed the attacks, which she called a “war of extermination”, on two warring cartels, which were identified as the Sinaloa and Juárez cartels.

Photographer Omar Gándara was murdered two days before Miranda Madrid in the state capital city of Chihuahua.

Miranda Madrid's final column detailed what he said was a string of 25 execution-style murders in the area that he attributed to the violence of the Juárez Cartel.

Two days after Miranda Madrid's murder, five gunmen were caught by the Mexican Secretariat of National Defense (Mexico) and its spokesperson said the group which belonged to the Sinaloa Cartel and this group was responsible for around 28 deaths in two attacks on centers for drug addicts in Ciudad Juarez, which is to the north of Nuevo Casas Grandes, and at least forty-five executions.

== Impact ==
According to an analysis by Terra México, after the state of Veracruz, which has seen 18 journalists killed, the state of Chihuahua is one of deadliest states for journalists along with Guerrero and Tamaulipas with 12 murdered journalists each in the Mexican drug war.

== Reactions ==
According to Reporters Without Borders, "Norberto Miranda Madrid clearly paid with his life for not conforming to the prevailing self-censorship in his coverage of this reality".

Gregorio Salazar, a spokesperson for the International Federation of Journalists in Latin America, said, "We condemn this latest appalling crime against Mexican journalists and demand that authorities offer full guarantee to our colleagues who need to exercise their professional tasks in safety. This murder, committed at work place, has shown there is no safe place for journalists in Mexico. Our colleagues in Mexico are denied fundamental rights by criminal gangs and drug traffickers."

== See also ==
- List of journalists killed in the Mexican Drug War
- Timeline of the Mexican drug war
