= Adrián Silva Moreno =

Mexican crime journalist and murder victim

- Born: 26 August 1978; Orizaba, Veracruz, Mexico
- Died: 14 November 2012 (aged 34); Tehuacán, Puebla, Mexico
- Cause of death: Gunshot wounds
- Known for: Investigative journalism

Adrián Silva Moreno (26 August 1978 – 14 November 2012) was a Mexican freelance journalist and collaborative crime reporter for several media outlets in the state of Puebla in central Mexico.

In his last report, Silva Moreno covered an oil theft investigation and a gunfight where organized crime was involved, but was later killed by gunfire when unidentified gunmen tracked him down and shot him from two moving vehicles. The assassins managed to escape, and the crime has not been solved. The motives behind his killing are unknown.

== Early life and career ==
Silva Moreno was born in Orizaba, Veracruz on 26 August 1978. He was a journalist collaborated for the outlets Glob@l México, Puntual Puebla, Radio Global, Diario Puntual, El Mundo de Tehuacán, where he covered their crime and police sections. Initially, Silva Moreno was hired in 2010 by the daily Diario Puntual to cover the local elections in the state of Puebla, and later continued his collaborative work by sending his police reports to the daily. Silva Moreno also worked for the Puebla government under the governorship of Mario Plutarco Marín Torres. Global México, one of the outlets that Moreno Silva worked for, however, stated that the reporter did not work for the government.

== Assassination ==
In the afternoon of 14 November 2012, Silva Moreno and his friend Misrael López González were covering a crime scene where the Mexican military discovered a warehouse that stashed several stolen oil products reportedly owned by an organized crime group. After concluding the oil theft investigation, both of them witnessed a gunfight between Mexican soldiers and alleged drug traffickers in Tehuacán, Puebla. While driving back six minutes later, two trucks cut them off the road and opened fire at their vehicle. Silva Moreno was killed instantly, while López González tried to escape by running away but was caught up and shot dead by gunmen about a block away from the scene in front of several onlookers. According to eyewitnesses, the gunmen were traveling in a stolen red Ford Lobo and a Suburban SUV; the latter was abandoned a few blocks away from the crime scene after one of the tires went flat.

The motives behind his assassination are still unclear, but the journalists close to Silva Moreno alleged that he was probably killed for reporting on the oil theft activities of a Mexican organized crime group or because he may have identified the drug traffickers involved in the shootout.

Nearly 100 journalists, bloggers and writers have been kidnapped or killed in Mexico since 2000, making the country one of the most dangerous places on the planet in which to exercise journalism and press freedom. Most of these crimes, too, have remained unsolved, and only a few perpetrators have been brought to justice.

=== Funeral ===
Family and friends held a wake in memory of Silva Moreno on 16 November 2012 in Tehuacán, the city where he was killed. The funeral home urged for an intensive surveillance operation and for law enforcement presence after rumors that the family had received death threats from organized crime.

=== Background ===
Silva Moreno was killed after reporting on an oil theft investigation. The Mexican drug trafficking organizations have been reported to steal fuel from the government-owned Pemex industry to later supply them to local vendors in exchange for cash. Most of these vendors are threatened and forced by drug lords to sell the stolen fuels to other users within the country or to refineries in the United States.

For most of its history, Pemex has been subject to robberies, sometimes stemmed from internal distributors or from low-level gangs who look into selling the stolen fuel at a price lower than the one available in market. But when President Felipe Calderón came into office in 2006, the theft dynamics within Pemex changed; instead of being small-scale gangs, transnational criminal organizations – like Los Zetas and the Sinaloa Cartel – stood up to take over the illegal activities. By doing so, they managed to extend their oil theft operatives outside Mexico and began stealing crude oil in growing numbers. Los Zetas, unlike other traditional criminal gangs in Mexico, tends to favor other illegal activities besides drug trafficking; the Sinaloa Cartel, on the other hand, tends to focus solely on drug trafficking and reportedly avoids carrying out kidnappings and extortions. If the Sinaloa Cartel oil theft allegations are true, it can be suspected that the modus operandi of the organization can change, and that the advantages of stealing from Pemex sums up as an "attractive business" for both groups.

Although the criminal gangs are much to blame, some members within the Pemex administration are allegedly corrupt and are "directly involved" in the illegal business. To illustrate this point, the Mexican Armed Forces seized more than 4 tons of cannabis inside a Pemex installation at Reynosa, Tamaulipas in February 2010 after security personnel notified them of several trucks carrying large sums of marijuana inside the facility, with armed men guarding them.

== See also ==
- Mexican drug war
- List of journalists killed in Mexico
