= Marco Antonio Ávila García =

Mexican crime journalist and murder victim

Marco Antonio Ávila
- Born: 15 January 1973
- Disappeared: 17 May 2012; Ciudad Obregón, Sonora, Mexico
- Died: May 18, 2012 (aged 39)
- Cause of death: Drug cartel violence, torture and strangulation
- Body discovered: in Guaymas, Mexico and near Empalme, Sonora, Mexico
- Occupation: Print newspaper journalist
- Years active: 15
- Employer(s): Diario Sonora de la Tarde and El Regional de Sonora
- Spouse: Karina Judith
- Children: Three
- Website: www.diariodesonora.com.mx www.elregionaldesonora.com.mx

Marco Antonio Ávila Garcia (15 January 1973 – 17/18 May 2012), a Mexican crime reporter for Diario Sonora de la Tarde in Ciudad Obregón and El Regional de Sonora newspapers in Sonora state, Mexico. He was abducted in Ciudad Obregón and tortured to death by a drug cartel and left on the side of the road near Empalme, which is also in Sonora. Garcia was the fifth journalist killed in 2012 in Mexico, which has become one of the most dangerous countries for journalists, and his murder preceded the 1 July 2012 Mexican elections, in which drug violence had become a major issue.

== Personal ==
Marco Antonio Ávila's mother is Josefina García. Ávila was thirty-nine-years old at the time of his murder. He was married to wife Karina Judith and the couple had two young children. He was buried at Panteón Jardín Mission in Ciudad Obregón.

== Career ==
Ávila had been a reporter for 15 years at the time of his murder and the most experienced on the staff of the sister newspapers for which he worked. He often wrote about organized crime throughout the country. Eduardo Flores, his director at both newspapers, said Ávila was never allowed to write information that would be considered overly aggressive and was not allowed to mention names associated with drug trafficking either, and he added that Ávila had not been threatened.

== Death ==
Mentioned locations within Mexico relative to the capital Mexico City.

Marco Antonio Ávila Garcia was abducted in Ciudad Obregón 17 May 2012 around 4:30 p.m. While waiting at a car wash, Ávila was asked if he was a journalist and then he was taken by three armed and masked men. The net that authorities created around the area after the journalist's disappearance failed to capture the criminals as his body was found 120 kilometers (almost 75 miles) from the scene of the abduction. The cause of death was strangulation. His corpse was found the next day wrapped in a large, black plastic bag on the side of the road around Guaymas and near Empalme in the state of Sonora, Mexico. Police say his body showed signs of torture and one ear had been cut off. A note written by a drug cartel was found near his body. The attorney general's office would not reveal which of the two warring cartels—the Gulf Cartel or the H. Cartel—in Ciudad Obregón wrote the note.

== Context ==
Mexico has become one of the most dangerous places for journalists in the world, but observers have noticed a sharp rise in the violence against journalists heading into the 2012 presidential elections. In the month before Ávila's murder, six other journalists have been killed in drug-related violence. Two weeks before Garcia's murder, the bodies of three other reporters were found in large trash bags similar to that in which Garcia was found but submerged in water. A reporter who had disappeared in January was found dead one week before Ávila's death.

== Impact ==
Ávila's death shows how dangerous the country is getting as criminals kill with impunity. Depending on the source, He was the 81st or 92nd journalist killed between 2000 and 2012 and 14 to 15 others had also disappeared in the same period. According to the Foreign Policy Research Institute, violence by the drug cartels was expected to increase in the period before the election and would be the major issue of the Mexican general election.

== Reactions ==
Irina Bokova, director-general of UNESCO, said, "The number of murders in the ranks of the Mexican media has reached such alarming proportions that it seriously undermines freedom of expression and democracy in the country. Impunity cannot be allowed to prevail and I urge the authorities to take every necessary step to bring his assassins to trial."

Bethel McKenzie, executive director of the International Press Institute, said: "It is no secret that Mexico is facing a major public safety crisis. But it should be no less obvious that journalists play an extremely critical role in Mexico by bringing the activities of drug cartels and of the corrupt politicians who support them to the public light. This valuable work is the reason that journalists are being silenced, and it is also the reason that - despite the difficulties involved - the federal government must step up and bring those responsible for crimes against the media to justice."

Raul Plascencia Villanueva, commission president of the National Human Rights Commission, called for an investigation and urged a policy of zero tolerance against the murder of journalists.

Josefina García, who is Ávila's mother, said, "I am a mother devastated by pain. I do not want this to be so. I do not want impunity. Like many others, this murder needs to be investigated with results because if we don't, then after a while those who murder will continue their attacks against other journalists."

== See also ==
- Mexican drug war
- List of journalists killed in Mexico
