= Miguel Angel Villagómez Valle =

Mexican crime journalist and murder victim

- Born: ca. 1979; Guerrero, Mexico
- Died: October 10, 2008 (aged 29); La Unión, Guerrero, Mexico
- Cause of death: Shooting
- Occupations: Journalist, editor and publisher
- Organization: La Noticia de Michoacán
- Known for: Founding a newspaper
- Successor: Francisco Rivera Cruz
- Spouse: Irania Iveth Leyva Faustino

Miguel Angel Villagómez Valle (ca. 1979 – 10 October 2008) was a Mexican journalist, editor and publisher who founded and operated the newspaper La Noticia de Michoacán in 2004 until his murder in La Unión, Guerrero, Mexico.

== Personal ==
Miguel Angel Villagómez Valle was a native of the Mexican State of Guerrero. He moved to the coastal city Lázaro Cárdenas, Michoacán in 1998. At the time of his death he lived in the city of Zihuatanejo with wife, Irania Iveth Leyva Faustino and their three children. His funeral mass was held at the Church of St. Joseph the Worker followed by a funeral procession that went through the offices of La Noticia de Michoacán.

== Career ==
Miguel Angel Villagómez Valle worked as a journalist in Lázaro Cárdenas, Michoacán since 1998. He founded and published his own newspaper, La Noticia de Michoacán, in 2004. The news outlet started out with only simple machines and three computers. The La Noticia de Michoacán, which operates as a small regional tabloid, often has stories on organized crime, corruption and drug-trafficking. Villagómez worked as the editor and publisher of La Noticia de Michoacán He headed the newspaper until his death at which time he was succeeded by his friend Francisco Rivera Cruz.La Noticia de Michoacán has the largest circulation in the west port with 2,500 copies sold daily. The tabloid puts out a new issue everyday but Saturday.

== Death ==
Mentioned locations within Mexico relative to the capital Mexico City.

In the weeks leading up to his death, Miguel Angel Villagómez Valle received a threatening call from a man who claimed to be a part of the Los Zetas, a militant group of former soldiers who works for the cartel. He warned his family of the threats and asked them to be alert. On the night of October 9, 2008, Miguel Angel Villagómez Valle was kidnapped on his way home from work after he took two colleagues home. The state attorney said that minutes later, he was intercepted by at least two cars with armed individuals who abducted him. On the following day, police found his body at around 10 a.m. at the side of the road near a dump about a kilometer away from the exit to the town of La Unión. His body was covered in bruises and had six gunshot wounds to the back and one to the head. His body also had the coup de grâce. His body was taken to Zihuatanejo where the investigation continued. His murder may have been linked to his work. He was the seventh journalist killed in 2008. The motive was unknown at the time of the murder.

== Context ==
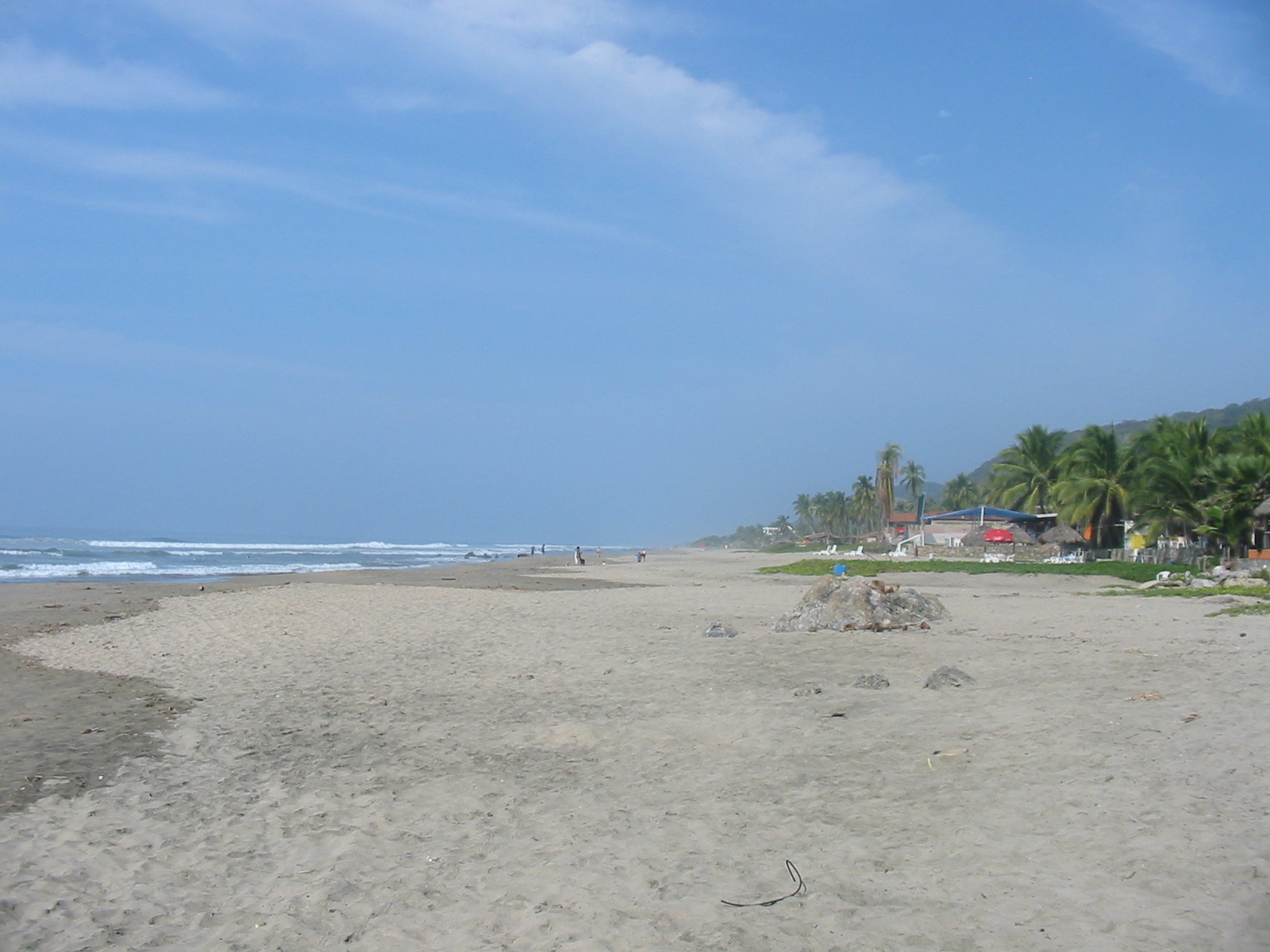
Playa Troncones (beach) located in the municipality of La Unión de Isidoro Montes de Oca, Guerrero

Michoacán is one of the most violent states in Mexico with confrontation between the cartels, the Los Zetas and La Familia. It is not uncommon for journalists to disappear, be abducted or murdered. Miguel Angel Villagómez Valle was the seventh journalist killed in Mexico in 2008. In many of these cases there is a lack of searching to find the killers.

== Reactions ==
The murder of Miguel Angel Villagómez Valle was condemned by the IAPA (Inter American Press Association) on 10 October 2008. The organization urged authorities to find who planned and carried out the crime. Soon after his death Mexico's Human Rights Commission appealed for the murders of journalists to be thoroughly investigated and called for an end to the impunity. His name was added to the Newseum modern wall in Washington, D.C.

== See also ==
- List of journalists and media workers killed in Mexico
- List of kidnappings
- List of unsolved murders (2000–present)
