= Gerardo García Pimentel =

Mexican crime journalist

Gerardo Israel García Pimentel
- Born: 1983; Mexico
- Died: December 8, 2007 (aged 23–24); Uruapan, Michoacán, Mexico
- Occupation: Journalist

Gerardo Israel García Pimentel (1983 – December 8, 2007) was a Mexican journalist and crime reporter.

He was shot dead outside his home in Uruapan, Michoacán, after a high-speed car chase.

García Pimentel worked as a reporter for the newspaper La Opinión de Michoacán. He covered mainly agriculture, but occasionally also police affairs. In 2006 nine journalists were killed in Mexico for reporting on violence and drug traffic, according to Press freedom group Reporters Without Borders. The last 30 years more than 50 journalists were murdered in Mexico, many of the killings carried out to silence journalists reporting on organized crime such as drug trafficking. This makes Mexico one of the world's most dangerous areas for reporters – only Iraq is considered more dangerous.

The killing was covered by newspapers worldwide.

== Reaction ==
- Reporters Without Borders - "The motive for this terrible murder is still unknown but the way García was apparently pursued before he was killed suggests he was personally targeted. Michoacán is one of the states that have been hit worst by violence against the press, above all because of its powerful drug cartels. We extend our condolences to García's family and we urge the authorities to take the case seriously and to explore the possibility that he was killed in connection with his work."

== See also ==
- Mexican drug war
- List of journalists killed in Mexico
