= Marco Aurelio Martínez Tijerina =

Mexican crime journalist and murder victim

Marco Aurelio Martínez Tijerina (1964/65 – July 11, 2010) was a Mexican journalist, who was abducted and murdered in the northern city of Montemorelos.

Martínez, who worked as a journalist for decades, had previously served as a correspondent for TV Azteca and W Radio. At the time of his death in 2010, Martinez was a reporter for XEDD La Tremenda, a radio station in Montemorelos, Nuevo Leon. He reported on local politics, but not crime.

Marco Aurelio Martínez Tijerina was abducted by gunmen on July 11, 2010, while driving his car through the city of Montemorelos. He was found beaten and shot the next day in Montemorelos. He was 45 years old.

== See also ==
- Mexican drug war
- List of journalists killed in Mexico
