= 2012 Michoacán murder of photographers =

Kidnapping and murder in Mexico

- Date: 16 August 2012
- Weapon: Guns
- Deaths: 2
- Victims: Arturo Barajas López & José Antonio Aguilar Mota
- Perpetrator: Knights Templar Cartel

The 2012 Michoacán murder of photographers concerns two Mexican freelance photographers, Arturo Barajas López (1966? - 19 August 2012) and José Antonio Aguilar Mota (1986? - 19 August 2012), who were kidnapped on 16 August 2012 and found murdered in Ecuandureo, Michoacán, Mexico. The two photojournalists worked in an area known for narcotics trafficking and could have been targeted because of their employment as freelance journalists who sometimes photographed accident scenes for the local newspaper.

== Career ==
Barajas, 46, and Lopez, 26, were both freelance photographers, often seen offering their services in the plaza in the town of Zamora and also to the Zamora Valley Press Association. Barajas had also photographed accident scenes and drug-related crimes for the Diaro de Zamora newspaper. They were not, however, members of the press organization.

== Deaths ==
Mentioned locations within Mexico relative to the capital Mexico City.

The two photographers were last seen on 16 August 2012 while on their way to photograph a social event. Their families said they had left home around 21:00 to work. Their bodies were found in the trunk of an abandoned car on Sunday, 19 August 2012, in the rural area of Tinaja de Vargas, outside the city of Ecuandureo. This city is about 90 miles from Morelia, the capital of Michoacán. Their bodies showed signs of torture, and they were killed by gunshot wounds to the head.

== Related crimes ==
The murders are believed to have been carried out by members of the Knights Templar Cartel (Los Caballeros Templarios Cartel), which since 2011 has controlled drug trafficking in the state of Michoacán. Fifteen other people died in drug-related violence during the same weekend in Michoacán. No progress has been made in the investigation.

== Impact ==
According to the National Institute of Statistics and Geography, there have been 27,199 homicides recorded in Mexico during 2011, making it the deadliest year since President Felipe Calderon was elected in 2006. During Calderon's presidency, Article 19 said there had been 72 journalists murdered, 13 journalists reported missing, and 40 assaults on journalists.

== Reactions ==
The Mexican federal government sent 1,000 additional troops to Michoacán to give extra support to local police forces in their fight against the drug cartels operating in that area.

== See also ==
- Mexican drug war
- List of journalists killed in Mexico
