= Rodolfo Rincón Taracena =

Mexican journalist and crime reporter

- Born: 5 July 1957; Chiapas, Mexico
- Disappeared: Villahermosa, Tabasco, Mexico
- Died: 20 January 2007 (aged 49)
- Occupation: Journalist
- Organization: Tabasco Hoy
- Known for: Investigative journalism

Rodolfo Rincón Taracena (5 July 1957 - 20 January 2007) was a Mexican journalist and crime reporter for Tabasco Hoy, a newspaper based in Villahermosa, Tabasco in southeastern Mexico. He was known for his direct reporting style, and wrote extensively about local drug trafficking and the growing presence of organized crime in his home state.

After receiving several death threats, five alleged members of Los Zetas reportedly kidnapped, tortured, mutilated, and burned Rincón Taracena's corpse on 20 January 2007. The investigation was closed on 1 March 2010 after his alleged assassins were arrested and confessed to have killed him. But several journalists have complained on the irregularities of the probe and urge that the case should remain open until the authorities confirm that the human remains found at a crime scene where those of Rincón Taracena.

== Early life and career ==
Rodolfo Rincón Taracena was a seasoned journalist and investigative crime reporter for Tabasco Hoy, a newspaper based in the southeastern Mexican city of Villahermosa, Tabasco. Known for his direct reporting, Rincón Taracena was used to receiving death threats from suspected drug traffickers. He wrote extensively about the local drug trade, organized crime, and the growing drug cartel criminal activities in the state of Tabasco. In May 2007, a severed head of a local public worker was tossed outside the offices of Tabasco Hoy in an attempt to intimidate the newspaper from covering topics regarding organized crime. Since 2005, the city had experienced a sharp increase in drug-related activities, particularly from the militarily-trained assassins of Los Zetas.

According to the International Press Institute, Rincón Taracena was regarded as "one of the best crime reporters in Tabasco state".

=== Assassination ===
On the morning of 20 January 2007, Rincón Taracena (aged 54) called his wife from work and told her that he would arrive home late in the afternoon, but he never made it back. The day he disappeared, Rincón Taracena was working on an article about a group of bank thieves in the area and gangsters extorting cash-machine users in Villahermosa, Tabasco, and was seen for the last time by his colleagues at around 8 p.m. leaving the Tabasco Hoy offices. He had recently published a report about the local drug trade with specific selling sites, and had identified several drug dealers by their alleged names.

More than three years later on 1 March 2010, the Tabasco state authorities informed through a press conference that Rincón Taracena had been kidnapped and killed by five alleged members of Los Zetas, a criminal organization that worked for the Mexican drug cartel known as the Gulf Cartel, for reporting on their drug retail sites. In response for this confirmation, Tabasco Hoy published an article titled: "Zetas killed Rincón", where they detailed the journalist's abduction and death. The kidnapping suspects confessed to the Tabasco authorities that Rincón Taracena was reportedly tortured, shot, beheaded, mutilated, and then burned inside a metal barrel with diesel fuel along with at least four other unidentified victims at a ranch in the municipality of Centro, Tabasco. His death was based solely on the confession of the criminals, because his remains were not able to be preserved and DNA tests were unsuccessful.

The Tabasco Attorney’s Office (PGJE) decided to close the investigation on grounds that Rincón Taracena was reportedly assassinated by Los Zetas. But several journalists from Tabasco Hoy, including the free press organization of Reporters Without Borders and the Committee to Protect Journalists, have urged the Mexican authorities to keep the investigation open until they prove that the human remains found were those of the journalist.

=== Background ===
Mexico is one of the most dangerous countries in the world for journalists, particularly those that cover reports on organized crime and drug trafficking. Since the year 2000, nearly 100 journalists, writers, and bloggers have been slain or abducted, and most of the crimes remain unsolved. The journalists who are believed to be "disappeared" are usually never found, but they are sometimes presumed dead or kidnapped.

=== Legacy ===
On 30 January 2007, several reporters of Tabasco Hoy and family members of Rincón Taracena protested in front of the offices of the Attorney General of Tabasco and demanded the authorities to solve the disappearance of the journalist. Former governor Andrés Granier Melo witnessed the protest too.

== See also ==
- Mexican drug war
- List of journalists killed in Mexico

== Sources ==
=== Bibliography ===
- The Disappeared in Mexico — Committee to Protect Journalists
- Grayson, George W.; Samuel Logan (14 August 2012). The Executioner's Men: Los Zetas, Rogue Soldiers, Criminal Entrepreneurs, and the Shadow State They Created. Transaction Publishers. pp. 136–137. ISBN 978-1412846646.
