= Carlos Denegri =

Mexican journalist

Carlos Denegri (1910–1970) was a Mexican journalist. He has been described as "one of Latin America's best known journalists", Mexico's "most prominent journalist from the 1940s to the 1960s", and Associated Press has referred to him as "one of the ten most influential reporters in the world".

For most of his life, he worked for the Mexican Excélsior newspaper. He was shot dead in his home on January 2, 1970.
