= XHJF-FM =

Radio station in Tierra Blanca, Veracruz

- Tierra Blanca, Veracruz; Mexico
- Frequency: 105.1 FM
- Branding: Radio Max

Programming
- Format: Regional mexican music and news/talk
- Affiliations: Imagen Radio

Ownership
- Owner: Gilberto Roldán Hazz

History
- First air date: December 6, 1964 (concession)

Technical information
- ERP: 6 kW
- Transmitter coordinates: 18°27′30″N 96°20′48″W

XHJF-FM is a radio station on 105.1 FM in Tierra Blanca, Veracruz, known as Radio Max.

== History ==
XEJF-AM 1350 received its concession on December 6, 1964. It was a 500-watt station owned by Carmen Romero de Bravo. Roldán acquired it in 1979 and it moved to 1050 with 5,000 watts in the early 2000s.

XEJF moved to FM in 2010.
