= XHQD-FM =

Radio station in Chihuahua, Chihuahua, Mexico

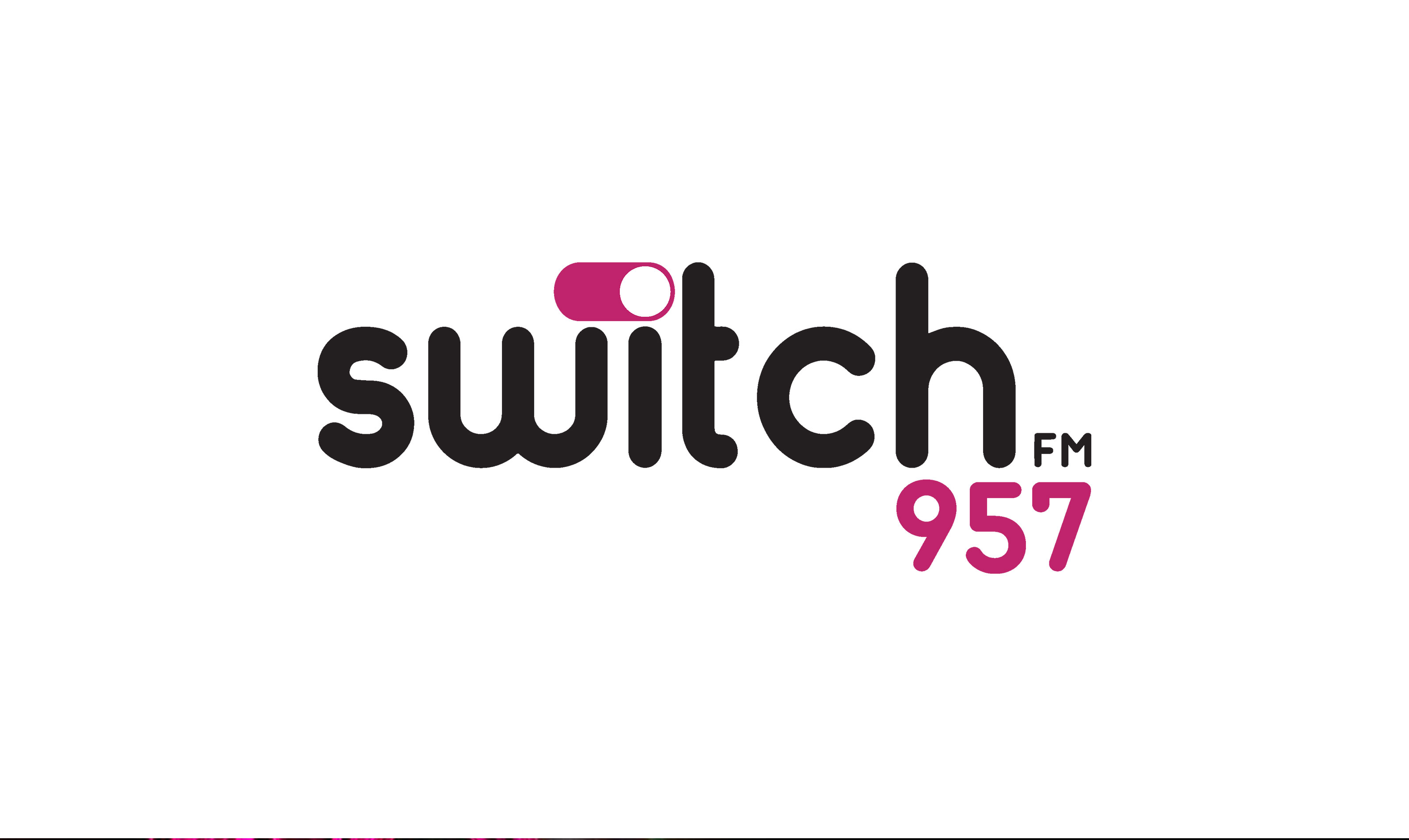
- Chihuahua City, Chihuahua; Mexico
- Frequency: 95.7 FM
- Branding: Switch FM

Programming
- Format: Pop

Ownership
- Owner: MegaRadio; (Radio XEQD, S.A. de C.V.)

History
- First air date: May 20, 1963 (concession)

Technical information
- Licensing authority: CRT
- Class: B1
- ERP: 25,000 watts
- HAAT: 102.61 m (336.6 ft)
- Transmitter coordinates: 28°36′07″N 106°08′19″W

Links
- Webcast: Listen live
- Website: switch957.com.mx

XHQD-FM is a radio station located in the city of Chihuahua City, Chihuahua, Mexico, known as Switch FM.

== History ==
XEQD-AM 920 received its concession on May 20, 1963. It was owned by Radio 920 de Chihuahua, S.A. and broadcast with 1,000 watts during the day, and soon after it signed on, 100 at night (changed to 250 in the 1990s).

XEQD was transferred to its current concessionaire in 2009 and approved to migrate to FM in 2011.

The station changed formats from romantic "Romance 95.7" to pop "Switch FM" in October 2019.
