= Roberto Marcos García =

Mexican crime journalist and murder victim

- Born: 1956
- Died: 21 November 2006 (aged 50); Alvarado, Veracruz, Mexico
- Cause of death: Gunshot wounds
- Occupation: Journalist
- Organization(s): Alarma; Testimonio
- Known for: Investigative journalism

Roberto Marcos García (1956 – 21 November 2006) was a Mexican journalist, crime reporter, and deputy editor for Testimonio, a crime-beat magazine based in the port city of Veracruz, Veracruz. He was also a local correspondent in Veracruz for the Mexico City weekly publication Alarma for over a decade.

Dedicated to reporting on the local drug trade and drug-related murders, Marcos García received death threats from organized crime. While traveling on his motorcycle in November 2006, two men ran over him and shot him on his head and chest, killing him instantly. The motives behind his assassination, however, remain unknown.

== Early life and career ==
Roberto Marcos García worked as a deputy editor for Testimonio for at least 13 years, and wrote about politics, drug-related killings, police reports, and the narcotics trade in the state of Veracruz. He also worked as a local correspondent for Alarma, a weekly publication based in Mexico City, for more than 10 years. Reporters close to him allege that Marcos García received several phone call death threats during his journalistic career. In addition, a week before his assassination, Marcos García publicized an article about gangsters stealing merchandise coming in by ships to the port city of Veracruz, Veracruz.

=== Assassination ===
On 21 November 2006, Marcos García (aged 50) was traveling from the state capital to Alvarado, Veracruz when a stolen vehicle with license plates from Mexico City ran him down around noon. Once the journalist was on the ground, two unidentified suspects shot him at close range more than ten times, twice on his head and four times on his chest. The authorities found 12 bullet casings at the scene; the suspects' vehicle was abandoned about 400 meters away.

The Mexican police arrested a suspect, José Cortés Terrones (alias El Loro), on 1 December 2006. According to the local press, Cortés Terrones reportedly threatened the journalist and warned him that two men wanted to abduct him for writing about their criminal activities two weeks before his killing. Although Cortés Terrones admitted that he knew Marcos García in person, he said that he had nothing to do with his assassination. With his arrest, the Veracruz police managed to capture another man, Sergio Muñoz López, (alias El Drácula), and charged both of them with the murder. Local media outlets stated that Muñoz López beat up Marcos García in 2003 with another group of men as a reprisal for his crime publications.

Nonetheless, the Attorney General Office of the State (PGJE) released Cortés Terrones and Muñoz López in December 2007 from prison due to "lack of evidence" against them. Family members of the journalist, however, stated that both men allegedly went to Marcos García's home a few days before his death to threaten him. The crime is yet to be solved, and Mexican authorities have not confirmed the motive behind the murder.

== See also ==
- Mexican drug war
- List of journalists killed in Mexico

== Sources ==
=== Bibliography ===
- Copperwaite, Paul (23 November 2010). The Mammoth Book of Drug Barons. Running Press. p. 435. ISBN 978-0762439935.
