= List of imprisoned, detained and missing journalists =

This list encompasses imprisoned, detained and missing journalists around the world.

== Imprisoned ==
List of journalists who were imprisoned:

- Reubin Clein (1905–1989) – American journalist imprisoned in Florida in 1950
- M. A. Farber – American journalist imprisoned in New York City in 1978
- Evan Gershkovich (born 1991) – American journalist imprisoned in 2023 in Russia
- Brian Karem (born 1961) – American journalist imprisoned in Texas in 1990
- Alsu Kurmasheva (born 1976), Russian-American journalist imprisoned in Russia in 2023
- Vanessa Leggett (born 1968) – American journalist detained by U.S. federal judge for failing to disclose sources
- Judith Miller (born 1948) – American journalist imprisoned in Washington, D.C., for refusing to testify against sources
- Jason Rezaian (born 1976) – Iranian-American journalist imprisoned in Iran from 2014 to 2016
- Ahmed Shihab-Eldin (born 1984) – American-Kuwaiti journalist briefly imprisoned in Kuwait in 2026
- Steven Sotloff (1983–2014) – American-Israeli journalist imprisoned in Iran in 2013 and killed in 2014 by ISIS
- Jim Taricani (1949–2019) – American politician imprisoned in Rhode Island in 2004
- Marie Torre (1924–1997) – American journalist imprisoned in New York in 1958
- Ali Ünal (born 1955) – Turkish journalist who was imprisoned in 2018
- Lance Williams and Mark Fainaru-Wada – American journalists imprisoned in California
- Josh Wolf (born 1982) – American journalist imprisoned in California

== Detained ==
List of journalists who were detained:

- Maziar Bahari (born 1967) – Iranian journalist who was detained in 2009
- Amy Goodman (born 1957) – American journalist detained following protest
- Austin Tice (born 1981) – American journalist detained without trial in Syria in 2012

== Missing ==
List of journalists whose current whereabouts are unknown, or whose deaths are unsubstantiated:

- Tokbergen Abiyev – Kazakh journalist who staged his own abduction
- Kazem Akhavan – Iranian photojournalist who went missing in 1982
- Isam al-Shumari – German journalist who went missing in 2004
- Muhammad al-Maqaleh Aleshteraki – Yemeni journalist who went missing in 2009
- Ali Astamirov – Chechen journalist who went missing in 2003
- Jaime Ayala – Peruvian journalist who went missing in 1986
- Adama Bayala – Burkinabé journalist who went missing in 2024
- Andrei Bazvluk – Ukrainian journalist who went missing in 1996
- Ambrose Bierce (born 1842) – American journalist who went missing in 1913
- Jean Bigirimana – Burundian journalist who went missing in 2016
- Gamaliel López Candanosa – Mexican journalist who went missing in 2007
- María Esther Aguilar Cansimbe – Mexican journalist who went missing in 2009
- Causeway Bay Books disappearances, five staff members from Hong Kong bookstore went missing in 2015
- Moisés Sánchez Cerezo – Mexican journalist who went missing in 2015
- Ming Chan – South China Morning Post journalist who went missing in 2023
- Pirouz Davani (born 1961) – Iranian journalist who went missing in 1998
- Prageeth Eknaligoda – Sri Lankan journalist
- Joey Estriber – Filipino journalist
- Jesús Medina Ezaine – Venezuelan photojournalist who went missing in 2017
- Bashar Fahmi – Jordanian national journalist who went missing in 2012
- Irma Flaquer (born 1938) – Guatemalan journalist who went missing in 1980
- Sean Flynn (born 1941) – American photojournalist declared missing in Cambodia in 1970
- José Antonio García – Mexican journalist who went missing in 2006
- Azory Gwanda – Tanzanian journalist who went missing in 2017
- Mohamed Hassaïne (born 1945) – Algerian journalist who went missing in 1994
- Reda Helal – Egyptian journalist who went missing in 2003
- Jodi Huisentruit (born 1968) – American journalist who went missing in 1995 and was declared dead in 2001
- Sergei Ivanov – Russian journalist who went missing in 1995
- Lukin Johnston (1887–1933) – Canadian journalist who went missing following an interview with Adolf Hitler in 1933
- Jamshid Karimov (born 1967) – Uzbekistani journalist who went missing in 2006
- Guy-André Kieffer (born 1949) – French-Canadian journalist who wet missing in 2004
- Acquitté Kisembo – French journalist who went missing in 2003
- John Lake (born 1930) – American journalist who went missing in 1967
- Frank Lenz (born 1867) – American bicyclist and photojournalist went missing near the Ottoman Empire in 1894
- Pirí Lugones (1925–1978) – Argentine journalist who went missing in 1977
- Ebrima Manneh (born 1978) – Gambian journalist who was held secretly in custody in 2006
- Rafael Ortiz Martínez – Mexican journalist who went missing in 2006
- Primitivo Mijares (born 1931) – Filipino journalist who went missing in 1977
- Belmonde Magloire Missinhoun – Congolese journalist who went missing in 1998
- Alfredo Jiménez Mota (born 1980) – Mexican journalist who went missing in 2005
- Manasse Mugabo – Rwandan journalist who went missing in 1995
- Emmanuel Munyemanzi – Rwandan journalist who went missing in 1998
- Milan Nepali – Nepalese journalist
- Frédéric Nérac (born 1960) – French journalist who went missing in 2003
- Juanita Nielsen (born 1937) – Australian journalist
- Vadivel Nimalarajah – Sri Lankan journalist
- Oralgaisha Omarshanova (born 1968) – Kazakh journalist who went missing in 2007
- Serge Oulon – Burkinabé journalist who went missing in 2024
- Madan Paudel – Nepalese journalist
- Oleksandr Panych – Ukrainian journalist who went missing in 2002
- Gerardo Paredes Pérez – Mexican journalist who went missing in 2007
- Yelena Petrova – Ukrainian journalist who went missing in 1996
- Zane Plemmons (born 1982) – Mexican-American journalist who went missing in 2012
- Subramaniam Ramachandran, Sri Lankan journalist
- Ahmed Rilwan (1986–2014) – Maldivian journalist
- Sergio Landa Rosado – Mexican journalist who went missing in 2013
- Victoria Roshchyna (1996–2024) – Ukrainian journalist declared missing in 2023 and confirmed dead in 2024
- Maksim Shabalin – Russian journalist who went missing in 1995
- Zeenat Shahzadi – Pakistani journalist
- Vitaly Shevchenko – Ukrainian journalist who went missing in 1996
- Chitra Narayan Shrestha – Nepalese journalist
- Andrew Shumack – American journalist who went missing in 1995
- Djuro Slavuj – Kosovan journalist who went missing in 1998
- Feliks Titov – Russian journalist who went missing in 1995
- Kalifara Séré – Burkinabé journalist who went missing in 2024
- Jonathan Spollen (born 1983) – Irish journalist who went missing in 2012
- Dana Stone (born 1939) – American photojournalist declared missing in Cambodia in 1970
- Rodolfo Rincón Taracena – Mexican journalist who went missing in 2007
- Elyuddin Telaumbanua – Indonesian journalist who went missing in 2005
- Prakash Singh Thakuri – Nepalese journalist
- Moataz Wadnan – Egyptian journalist who went missing in 2021
- Susan Walsh (born 1960) – American journalist who disappeared from New York in 1996
- Mauricio Estrada Zamora – Mexican journalist who went missing in 2008
- Evaristo Ortega Zárate – Mexican journalist who went missing in 2010
- Dzmitry Zavadski (born 1972) – Belarusian journalist who went missing in 2000
- Jarosław Ziętara (born 1968) – Polish journalist who went missing in 1992

== See also ==
- List of Americans wrongfully imprisoned or detained abroad
