= Tropical Storm Jose (2005) =

Atlantic tropical storm in 2005

- Tropical Storm Jose shortly after landfall on Veracruz early on August 23

Meteorological history
- Formed: August 22, 2005
- Dissipated: August 23, 2005

Tropical storm
- 1-minute sustained (SSHWS/NWS)
- Highest winds: 60 mph (95 km/h)
- Lowest pressure: 998 mbar (hPa); 29.47 inHg

Overall effects
- Fatalities: 16 total
- Damage: $45 million (2005 USD)
- Areas affected: Eastern Mexico
- IBTrACS
- Part of the 2005 Atlantic hurricane season

Tropical Storm Jose was a short-lived tropical storm which made landfall in central Mexico during August 2005. Jose was the tenth named storm of the 2005 Atlantic hurricane season, and the fourth of six systems (three hurricanes and three tropical storms) to make landfall in Mexico in that year.

Tropical Storm Jose formed in the Bay of Campeche on August 22 and made landfall in the Mexican state of Veracruz the next day. It retained tropical characteristics for less than one day before dissipating, but still brought heavy rainfall to the region. Jose killed 16 people in Mexico, and caused $45 million (2005 USD) in damage.

== Meteorological history ==
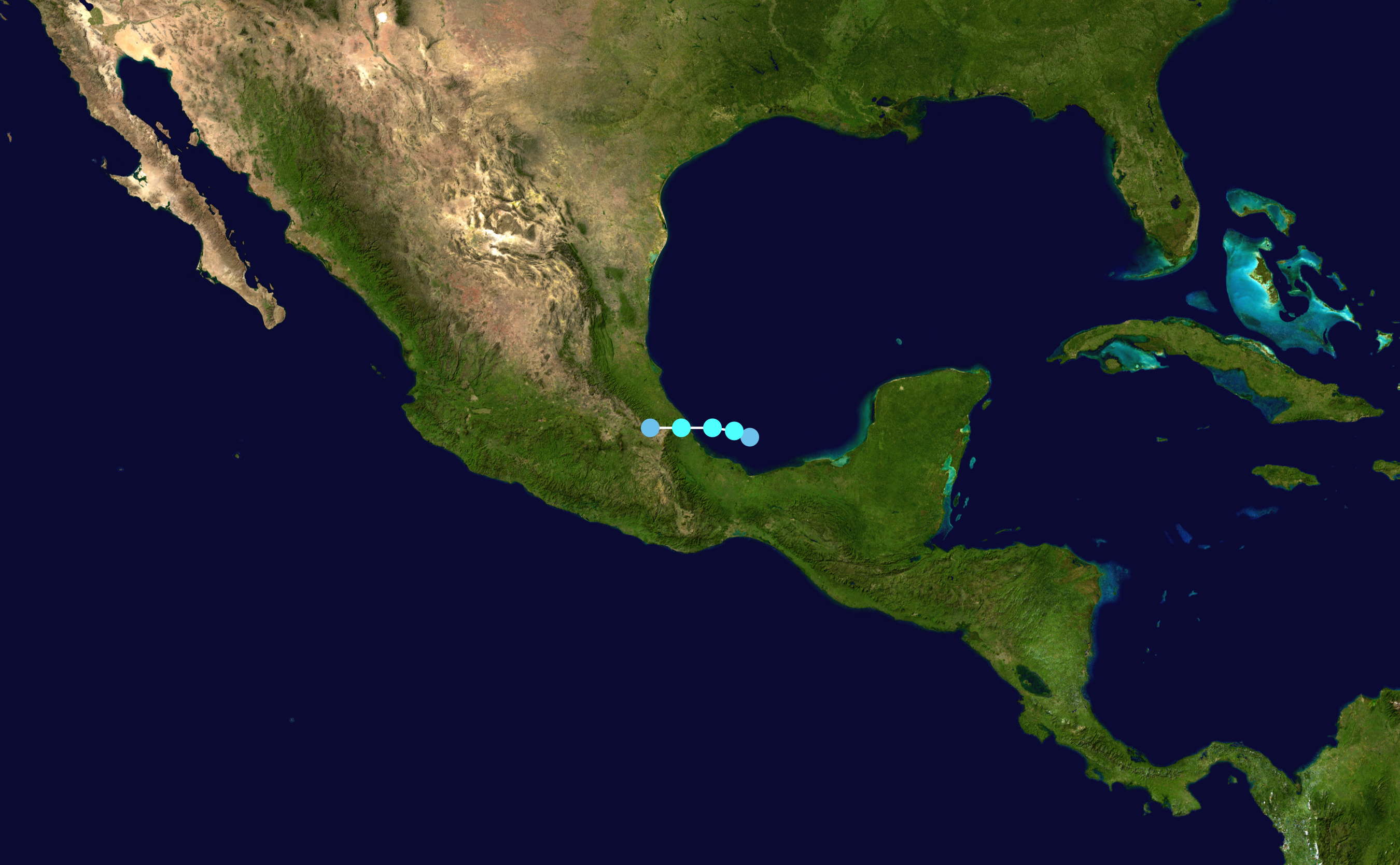
Map plotting the storm's track and intensity, according to the Saffir–Simpson scale Map key Saffir–Simpson scale Tropical depression (≤38 mph, ≤62 km/h) Tropical storm (39–73 mph, 63–118 km/h) Category 1 (74–95 mph, 119–153 km/h) Category 2 (96–110 mph, 154–177 km/h) Category 3 (111–129 mph, 178–208 km/h) Category 4 (130–156 mph, 209–251 km/h) Category 5 (≥157 mph, ≥252 km/h) Unknown Storm type Tropical cyclone Subtropical cyclone Extratropical cyclone, remnant low, tropical disturbance, or monsoon depression

Tropical Storm Jose was first identified as a tropical wave that moved off the western coast of Africa on August 8, 2005. On August 13, the system spawned Tropical Depression Ten over the central Atlantic; the wave itself continued westward, entering the Caribbean on August 17. Slight development took place as the system moved over the Yucatán Peninsula; however, by the time it entered the Bay of Campeche on August 21, little convection was associated with the system. The following morning, convection exploded under highly favorable divergence from an upper-level anticyclonic flow. According to readings from the QuikSCAT satellite, a well-defined low pressure center developed by 1200 UTC, prompting the National Hurricane Center to classify the system as Tropical Depression Eleven. At this time, the depression was situated roughly 110 mi (175 km) east of Veracruz, Mexico.

Situated over very warm waters and within an area of low wind shear, the depression was able to quickly organize; however, due to its proximity to land, the NHC noted, "the system does not have very long...to take advantage of these favorable conditions." Located to the south of a mid-level ridge, the depression tracked just north of due west and kept this motion through the remainder of its existence. The depression rapidly intensified as it moved to the west, becoming Tropical Storm Jose just six hours later. The global model guidance initially failed to resolve the storm's track well, with some models indicating that it would stall offshore. Jose continued to strengthen as it moved towards the coast and made landfall north of Veracruz city early on August 23 with winds reaching a peak of 60 mph (95 km/h). As Jose made its landfall an eye was beginning to form, although the storm was still well short of hurricane intensity. Tropical Storm Jose quickly weakened after landfall and dissipated that afternoon in the mountains of central Mexico only 24 hours after forming.

== Preparations and impact ==
Total Rains from Jose
Municipality	Rainfall
Misantla	10.04 in (25.50 cm)
El Raudel	8.73 in (22.17 cm)
Cuetzalan	6.14 in (15.60 cm)
Libertad	6.00 in (15.24 cm)
Martínez de la Torre	5.74 in (14.58 cm)
Altotonga	5.65 in (14.35 cm)
Rancho Nuevo	4.88 in (12.40 cm)
El Naranjillo	4.84 in (12.29 cm)

As Tropical Storm Jose formed so close to shore there was a lead time of less than 9 hours on the tropical storm warning for the Veracruz coastline. The area covered by the warning issued on August 22 was extended southwards as Jose intensified, before being canceled soon after landfall on August 23. The advisories issued by the National Hurricane Center emphasized that rainfall from Jose was the primary threat.

Across Mexico, Jose killed 16 people – five were in Veracruz's capital Xalapa, six were in elsewhere in Veracruz due a landslide, and five were in Oaxaca due to mudslides. Tropical Storm Jose was responsible for damaging crops, highways and homes; flooding districts in several cities in the state of Veracruz, and the evacuation of 80,000 people to shelters. The government of that state estimated the damages caused by the storm to be approximately $45 million (2005 USD). Approximately 120 municipalities were affected by the torrential rain, but the majority of the damage was concentrated to eight of them: Martínez de la Torre, Misantla, Nautla, San Rafael, Vega de la Torre, Actopan, Cardel and Úrsulo Galván. Damage to the highway infrastructure was estimated at $33 million (2005 USD).

It was also reported that the storm damaged at least 16,000 homes and about 250 square kilometers (60 thousand acres) of land used for cattle. In addition over 420 square kilometers (103 thousand acres) of various crops, including sugarcane, corn and bananas, were flooded. Many boats were also lost as a result of Jose. 90 active medical brigades were sent to the region to reduce the risk of infections amongst the affected population.

== See also ==
- Other tropical cyclones named Jose
- Tropical Storm Bret (2005)
- Tropical Storm Gert (2005)
- Tropical Storm Fernand (2013)
