= Jaime Ayala =

Jaime Ayala may refer to:

- Jaime Zobel de Ayala (born 1934), Filipino businessman
- Jaime Augusto Zobel de Ayala (born 1959), Filipino businessman
- Jaime Ayala (footballer) (born 1990), Mexican footballer
- Jaime Ayala (journalist), Peruvian journalist
