= Nautla Region =

- Region
- Nautla labeled #4
- Country: Mexico
- Capital: Veracruz
- Largest city: Martínez de la Torre

Population (2020)
  - Total: 382,892
- Time zone: UTC−6 (CST)

Nautla Region is one of the regions of Veracruz, Mexico.

== Municipalities ==
Municipality code	Name	Population		Land Area			Population density	
Municipality code	Name	2020	Rank	km^{2}	sq mi	Rank	2020	Rank
023	Atzalán	49,180	4	521.9	201.5	2	94/km^{2} (244/sq mi)	6
042	Colipa	5,743	10	130.4	50.3	9	44/km^{2} (114/sq mi)	10
095	Juchique de Ferrer	15,059	7	187.8	72.5	7	80/km^{2} (208/sq mi)	7
102	Martínez de la Torre	108,842	1	398.7	153.9	3	273/km^{2} (707/sq mi)	2
109	Misantla	65,761	2	523.4	202.1	1	126/km^{2} (325/sq mi)	3
114	Nautla	10,130	9	355.6	137.3	5	28/km^{2} (74/sq mi)	11
211	San Rafael	30,351	5	291.9	112.7	6	104/km^{2} (269/sq mi)	4
163	Tenochtitlán	5,040	11	86.8	33.5	11	58/km^{2} (58/km^{2})	8
183	Tlapacoyan	61,377	3	168	65	8	365/km^{2} (946/sq mi)	1
192	Vega de Alatorre	20,204	6	388.6	150.0	4	52/km^{2} (135/sq mi)	9
197	Yecuatla	11,205	8	112.5	43.4	10	100/km^{2} (258/sq mi)	5
	Nautla Region	382,892	—	3,166	1,222.40	—	121/km^{2} (313/sq mi)	—
Source: INEGI

=== Largest cities ===
Largest cities or towns in Nautla Region Source:
Rank		Municipality	Pop.
1	Martínez de la Torre	Martínez de la Torre	64,692
2	Tlapacoyan	Tlapacoyan	35,893
3	Misantla	Misantla	30,232
4	Independencia	Martínez de la Torre	16,190
5	Vega de Alatorre	Vega de Alatorre	7,578
6	San Rafael	San Rafael	6,838
7	Emilio Carranza	Vega de Alatorre	5,926
8	La Palmilla	Tlapacoyan	5,030
9	Puntilla Aldama	San Rafael	4,949
10	Felipe Carrillo Puerto	Martínez de la Torre	4,234
