= Yecuatla =

- Municipality and town
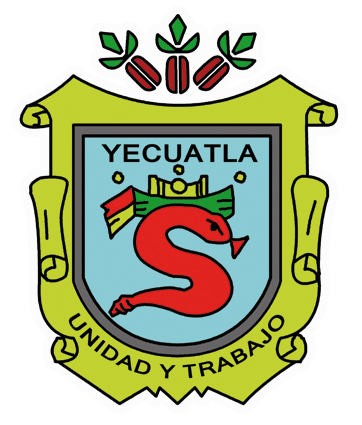
- Coat of arms

- Location in Mexico
- Coordinates: 19°52′N 96°47′W
- Country: Mexico
- State: Veracruz

Area
  - Total: 135.72 km^{2} (52.40 sq mi)

Population (2005)
  - Total: 11,446
- Time zone: UTC-6 (Central Standard Time)

Yecuatla is a municipality located in the north zone in the Mexican state of Veracruz, about 40 km from the state capital Xalapa. It has a surface of 135.72 km^{2}. It is located at 19°52′N 96°47′W.

== Name ==
The name comes from the language Náhuatl, Yec-uauh-tlan; that means "Place of three snakes".

== Geography ==
The municipality of Yecuatla is bordered to the north-east by Colipa, to the south by Chiconquiaco, to the west by Misantla and to the north-west by Colipa.

The climate in Yecuatla is warm-regular with an average temperature of 22.5°C, with rains in summer and autumn.

== Agriculture ==
It produces principally maize, bean, green chile, orange fruit and coffee.

== Celebrations ==
Every Augusts, a festival is held to celebrate Virgen de la Asunción, patron of the town and in December there is a festival held in honor of the Virgin of Guadalupe.
