= List of municipal presidents of Misantla =

Following is a list of municipal presidents of Misantla, in the Mexican state of Veracruz:

Municipal president	Term	Political party	Notes
Francisco Cánovas y Pasquel	1900–1911		
Eugenio Martínez	1911–1912		
Abel Serratos	1912–1913		
Trinidad Velásquez	1913–1915		
Josafat Martínez	1915–1916		
Ismael Rodríguez	1916–1917		
Isauro Luna	1917–1918		
Daniel Riviello	1918–1919		
Carlos Vazquez	1919–1920		
Isauro Luna	1920–1921		Second time
Víctor Meza Domínguez	1921–1922		
Isauro Jiménez	1922–1923		
Víctor Meza Domínguez	1923–1924		Second time
Mauricio Jiménez	1925–1926		
José del Carmen	1926–1927		
Severo Cárdenas	1928–1929		
Anastasio Vázquez	1930–1931		
Paulino Cubas	1931–1932		Was replaced by Francisco F. Pérez
Manuel Delgado	1932–1933		Was replaced by Leonardo Ramírez
Feliciano López Santiago	1934–1935		
Luis Orozco	1936–1938		
Feliciano López Santiago	1938–1939		Second time
Mauricio Jiménez	1940–1941		Was replaced by Abel Fernández Mora
Pedro Fernández Mora	1942–1943		
Pedro Martiniano	1944–1945		Was replaced by Félix Muñoz
Gonzalo Rabelo	1945–1946		Was replaced by Armando Vodals
Rufino Zacarías	1947–1949		
Gustavo de la Hoz	1950–1952		Was replaced by Salvador Valencia
Alberto Rodríguez Lagunas	1952–1955		
Romualdo Hernández Chimal	1955–1958		
Juan Pablo Prom Lavoignet	1958–1961		
José Uribe Rivera	1961–1964	PRI	
Cornelio Recio	1964–1967		Was replaced by José Beltrán and Francisco Reyes R. (Municipal Council)
David Arroyo Castellanos	1967–1970		
Marco Antonio Ramírez Luzuriaga	1970–1973		
Nicodemus Santos Luck	1973–1976		
Camilo Mujica Meza	1976–1979	PRI	
Roberto Castellanos García	1979–1982		
Celestino Hernández Mora	1982–1985		
León Arroyo Castellanos	1985–1988		
Idelfonso Fernández Ruiz	1988–1991	PRI	
Julio Armando Espinoza Barrios	1991–1994	PRI	
Carlos Carballal Valero	1995–1997	PRI	
Gustavo Moreno Ramos	1998–2000	PRI	
Cirino Boo Ríos	2000–2004	PRI	
Víctor Domínguez Hernández	2005–2007	PAN	
Álvaro Mota y Limón	2008–2010	PRI; PVEM; Panal	Coalition "Fidelity Alliance for Veracruz" [Coalición "Alianza Fidelidad por Veracruz"] (CAFV)
Javier Hernández Candanedo	2011–2013	PAN; Panal	Coalition "Long Live Veracruz"
Efrén Meza Ruiz	2014–2018	Alternativa Veracruzana	
Othón Hernández Candanedo	2018–2022	PAN; PRD	
Javier Hernández Candanedo	2022–	PVEM; PT; Morena	
