= Kidnapping and murder of Moisés Sánchez Cerezo =

Mexican crime journalist who was murdered

Moisés Sánchez Cerezo
- Born: José Moisés Sánchez Cerezo; Medellín de Bravo, Veracruz, Mexico
- Disappeared: Medellín de Bravo, Veracruz, Mexico
- Died: January 2, 2015 (aged 49)

On January 2, 2015, Mexican social activist and journalist Moisés Sánchez Cerezo was kidnapped from his home in Medellín de Bravo, Veracruz, Mexico, and killed. According to eyewitness reports, armed men dressed in civilian clothing broke into his house and forced him into a vehicle. The kidnappers also took Sánchez's computer, camera, and cellphones. Sánchez was the founder and director of the weekly newspaper La Unión ("The Union"), where he covered a variety of topics, including political corruption, government mismanagement, and organized crime. He was also active on social media as a reporter, and in his community as a taxi driver, small business owner, and neighborhood organizer. His family initially suspected that the mayor of Medellín de Bravo, Omar Cruz Reyes, was responsible for masterminding the kidnapping because Sánchez was a harsh critic of his administration. The mayor, however, pledged his innocence and stated that Sánchez and he maintained a close friendship. On January 24, his corpse was discovered inside a plastic bag in Manlio Fabio Altamirano, Veracruz. Post-mortem examinations confirmed that his kidnappers cut his throat open and severed his head while he was still alive before mutilating his body into several pieces. Investigators believe that municipal policemen, acting on orders of the mayor, participated in the murder. Sánchez was the first journalist kidnapped and killed in Mexico in 2015.

== Background ==
Sánchez began his career in journalism in the late 1980s and early 1990s. He was a house newspaper distributor for Notiver, one of the most-read newspapers in Veracruz. Sánchez became interested in journalism by socializing with reporters early in the morning before his daily distribution. Sánchez did not have a college degree nor any background in journalism. Years later he began participating in several civil society projects in Medellín de Bravo and founded the neighborhood Gutiérrez Rosas, where he lived. In 2005, Sánchez founded La Unión ("The Union"), a weekly newspaper based in Medellín de Bravo. Originally, the outlet had a print version that catered to readers in the municipality of Medellín de Bravo, including those in the regions of Puente Moreno, Paso del Toro, El Tejar, and Medellín, the county seat. He and other citizens interested in informing their community distributed the newspaper themselves. However, lack of funds forced Sánchez to switch from his free print edition to an online-only edition.

Under his management, La Unión covered a variety of topics, though it was characterized for its critical and direct reporting style. Sánchez was known for publishing articles about organized crime violence stemming from drug trafficking, local political corruption, traffic accidents, community concerns, and government mismanagement. He was also active on his personal Facebook page, where he made posted about public works left incomplete by the local government, like street potholes and water leaks. Sánchez also worked as a photographer and reporter for media outlets in the Veracruz–Boca del Río metropolitan area. He did not receive money for his work as a media worker, however. Sánchez provided for his family by being a taxi driver and owning a small grocery store. He was a taxi driver for two reasons: Sánchez wanted to earn enough money to make a living for his family. But he was also wanted that job because it allowed him to talk with people from his hometown on a daily basis. This provided a venue for him to collect information about citizens' pleas for his publications. His colleagues described Sánchez as a dedicated news gatherer, despite the fact that he was self-taught and had no professional training in journalism. Because Medellín de Bravo is semi-rural and located outside of the Veracruz metropolitan area, many media outlets do not report what occurs in the region. Official journalists relied on his information to report what occurred in Medellín de Bravo. According to his son, Sánchez was kidnapped for his journalism, given that he reported on violence in Medellín de Bravo and had received death threats. He believed this because the kidnappers did not take any money or valuable belongings from the house, and went specifically for Sánchez and his belongings related to his profession as a reporter. Weeks prior to his kidnapping, Sánchez had written about the public security problems in Medellín de Bravo.

On December 13, 2014, he published a report on social media that a vegetable merchant from El Tejar had been assaulted and killed. This incident happened in his neighborhood. That night, the neighbors organized and armed themselves with sticks, machetes, and other sharp objects. They carried out night patrols to prevent any repeat of that incident, and planned to protest against the local government for the lack of public safety. Sánchez also reported on a shootout that left a father and son injured. Sánchez and his neighbors criticized National Action Party (PAN) politician Omar Cruz Reyes, the mayor of Medellín de Bravo, along with the local police, for their alleged apathy. Sánchez also commented on Cruz Reyes's supposed special unit of the Mexican Navy that protected him. Sánchez got together with his neighbors on December 17 and formed the self-defense group Comité de Autodefensas de la Colonia Gutiérrez Rosas as a reaction to the security problems in the municipality. Sánchez was a neighborhood committee leader responsible for organizing people. On December 27, a day after Cruz Reyes's annual press conference, Sánchez reported on his Facebook page of the discovery of two human corpses in Medellín de Bravo.

Mexico is one of the most dangerous countries in the world for journalists. More than 100 media workers have been kidnapped and/or killed since 2000, and most of the crimes against the press remain unsolved and with few perpetrators arrested. The state of Veracruz, in addition, is the most dangerous state in Mexico for journalists. At least fifteen journalists have been killed and four more remain disappeared since 2000 (at least ten of them were killed between 2010 and 2014). Many of the journalists killed in Veracruz wrote about organized crime and corruption. The most recent incident in Veracruz prior to Sánchez's abduction was the kidnapping and murder of Gregorio Jiménez de la Cruz in February 2014. Sánchez was the first journalist kidnapped and killed in Mexico in 2015. On January 4, 2015, two days after his abduction, former Televisa reporter Jazmín Martínez Sánchez was killed in the State of Nayarit. A day later, another media worker was killed. Jesús Tapia Rodríguez, anchorman of Parras TV, was stabbed to death inside his home in Coahuila.

== Kidnapping ==
At around 7:30 p.m. (CST) on January 2, 2015, three vehicles arrived at the home of José Moisés Sánchez Cerezo, located in the Gutiérrez Rosas neighborhood of Medellín de Bravo, Veracruz, Mexico. According to his neighbors, at least nine armed men wearing ski-masks descended from the vehicles and stormed the house asking for him. Sánchez was sleeping in his bedroom upstairs, while his wife was watching television with her grandchildren. They broke several doors inside the house and trashed some rooms before taking Sánchez's computer, camera, and cellphones. The gunmen then forced him into one of the vehicles. While this was happening, he asked his abductors to not hurt his family. The kidnappers then fled the scene to an unknown location. His son Jorge Sánchez Ordónez claimed that the neighbors contacted the local police soon after the abduction took place, but that their calls were not answered. They then called the federal military agency, the Secretariat of National Defense (SEDENA), which deployed agents throughout Medellín de Bravo. Sánchez's family claims that law enforcement authorities took several hours to arrive at the crime scene. Before midnight, Sánchez's family members went to offices of the Attorney General of Veracruz to formally issue a complaint for his disappearance. State authorities then carried out an investigative operation overnight in an attempt to locate him.

== Reactions and protests ==
The press freedom organization Article 19 condemned the attack and asked for the office of the Procuraduría General de la República (PGR), Mexico's Attorney General Office, to take over the case. They also asked the Mexican government to provide protection for Sánchez's family and to guarantee the journalist's own life and safety. The New York-based press freedom group Committee to Protect Journalists (CPJ) also condemned the attack and asked for authorities to increase their efforts to locate Sánchez and arrest the kidnappers. CPJ researchers said in the report that Veracruz state authorities have, in past incidents, tried to dismiss the connection between journalists' profession and their murders. "Veracruz authorities have a history of denigrating the activities of local journalists and a miserable record of impunity in cases of crimes against journalists," said Carlos Lauría, CPJ's representative for Latin America. The Inter American Press Association also expressed its concern over Sánchez's disappearance. It stated that it was concerned that attacks against the press in Mexico would continue in 2015. PEN International published a report asking for Mexican authorities to investigate Sánchez's kidnapping case along with Mario Alberto Crespo Ayón's, a TV reporter and former print journalist who was reported missing in Sinaloa in December 2014.

Protests were also carried out a few days after the abduction, in both the state of Veracruz and as well as nationwide, by journalists and others who demanded to know Sánchez's whereabouts. In Chilpancingo, Guerrero, journalists and photographers protested on Mexican Federal Highway 95 (also known as the "Autopista del Sol"). They started at 11 a.m. on January 4, 2015, and stayed there for about an hour. Some of the protesters held placards, while others handed out several fliers to drivers returning from Acapulco with information about Sánchez's kidnapping and about the risks of being a journalist in Mexico. After handing out all their fliers, the protesters left the highway. Protests were also carried out in three Guerrero cities, Acapulco, Chilpancingo, and Zihuatanejo. In Acapulco, reporters, media correspondents, and photographers from several media outlets met at La Diana roundabout. The protesters demanded Sánchez's safe return and criticized the government of Veracruz for failing to protect journalists. They also sent a message to Guerrero authorities for its own shortcomings in responding to local attacks on the press. In Tecoanapa, reporters from Chilpancingo, Acapulco, Tlapa, and the Costa Chica region gathered in protest as well.

On January 5, outside Medellín de Bravo City Hall a group of journalists gathered to demand authorities for Sánchez's safe return. In a sign of protest, the attendees placed their cameras and placards on floor of city hall. One of Sánchez's brothers challenged Cruz Reyes to walk out of city hall and speak to the protesters. Journalists also asked for the removal of the mayor's political immunity in order to facilitate the investigations pending against him. In Xalapa, the state capital, protesters met outside the government building of Javier Duarte de Ochoa, the Governor of Veracruz, demanding Sánchez's return. "Duarte, bring him back before [President Enrique Peña Nieto] arrives", read one of the posters held by a journalist, in reference to the President's scheduled trip to Veracruz that week. The protesters also criticized Duarte for the violence and impunity that prevails among Veracruz's media. After a protester read a communiqué directed at President Peña Nieto, Secretary of Interior Miguel Ángel Osorio Chong, and Attorney General Jesús Murillo Karam, among others, the protest made its way to the historic downtown area. There they protested for the safe return of three other Veracruz journalists that remain disappeared: Evaristo Ortega Zárate (2010), Manuel Gabriel Fonseca Hernández (2011), and Sergio Landa Rosales (2012). On their placards, the journalists paid homage to murdered Veracruz journalists: Regina Martínez Pérez (2011), Víctor Manuel Báez Chino (2012), and Gregorio Jiménez de la Cruz (2014). That same day, similar protests were carried out in other cities in the State of Veracruz: Veracruz, Boca del Río, Acayucan, and Coatzacoalcos. In Coatzacoalcos, where journalist Jiménez de la Cruz was killed in 2014, more than 20 journalists protested at city hall demanding Sánchez's safe return. In Acayucan, several journalists marched in the downtown area with the same demands. They read a document signed by over 100 journalists from Veracruz in which they asked for the intervention by the federal government and international organizations in locating Sánchez.

On January 6, journalists in Puebla, Puebla protested and asked authorities to return Sánchez alive. In Puebla's main square, the journalists gathered with placards criticizing Veracruz authorities for their alleged negligence and apathy. They read a manifesto asking for the PGR to intervene and transfer the case to the Special Prosecutor for Crimes against Freedom of Expression (Fiscal Especializada de Atención a Delitos contra la Libertad de Expresión [Feadle]), an organ within the PGR that specializes in attacks against the press. With placards, they spoke out against the murders of Veracruz journalists, which have increased since 2000. The next day, other protesters gathered outside a Veracruz state government office in Mexico City. They asked authorities to seek justice for Sánchez and other victims of violence in Mexico. Sánchez's family also protested outside the World Trade Center in Boca del Río, Veracruz prior to a ceremony conducted by President Peña Nieto. Sánchez's brother Juan Carlos Sánchez Cerezo protested and asked for President Peña Nieto to bring the case under federal jurisdiction, because he alleges state officials were not searching for his brother. On January 8, reporters from several media outlets protested outside Teatro Degollado in Guadalajara, Jalisco. They carried placards asking for Sánchez's return, and had a list of the more than one hundred journalists disappeared and/or killed in Mexico.

== Investigation and aftermath ==
On January 3, 2015, Governor Duarte told reporters at a press conference that all lines of investigation were being considered in the case. However, reporters stated that Duarte had simply referred to Sánchez as a "taxi driver and neighborhood activist" instead of mentioning his profession as a media worker. "Our priority is to be able to locate him to return him to his family", Duarte said. When questioned about the mayor's involvement, Duarte said that it was being considered. Investigators alleged that Sánchez's reports at La Unión and in his Facebook page reportedly angered Cruz Reyes. This line of investigation holds that three days before his kidnapping, Sánchez learned through a trusted source that the mayor had plans to silence him to "teach him a lesson". The family suspects that Cruz Reyes masterminded the kidnapping because he was angry at Sánchez for his critical remarks against the local government. In an interview that day, the mayor, however, denied his involvement in Sánchez's kidnapping, said he was worried and saddened about the incident, and agreed to cooperate in the investigation. He said that he had not met with Sánchez's family members in order to not obstruct the investigation. Cruz Reyes said that his collaborators have been working closely with the family, however. The Mayor also said that he had a clear conscience and that Sánchez was a close friend of his. "[Sánchez] was with our team during our political campaign ... we were very close to him," Cruz Reyes stated. People close to Sánchez claimed that the mayor and Sánchez were friends until December 2012, and that they were often seen together at political campaigns when Cruz Reyes was running for office. However, when Cruz Reyes did not appoint Sánchez as head of the Director of Social Communication in Medellín de Bravo, a post he wanted, problems began to surface. Instead of entrusting Sánchez to that position, they said, the mayor appointed a female reporter from Veracruz, and this ended up creating animosity between the two. After this incident, Sánchez began to take critical stances against Cruz Reyes in his reports.

Veracruz Attorney General Luis Ángel Bravo Contreras, who is working personally on the case, met with Sánchez's family at their home on January 4 and assured them that authorities were searching for him. Though he said that the agency working on the case could not provide more details of the investigation, Bravo promised to get back to them as the investigation advanced. He clarified that the case was not given any special priority because Sánchez was a reporter. "The important thing about this case is that he is a human and a native of Veracruz who has disappeared," Bravo said. Bravo told the family that the investigation was going well and that authorities were working on several leads. However, he highlighted the importance of keeping the details and evidences of the investigation secret in order to not jeopardize Sánchez's safety and to be able to bring him back safely to his family.

On January 5, Veracruz state authorities detained the municipal police force of Medellín de Bravo. In a communiqué, they informed that the 48-hour legal detention of the police officers was done to investigate the possible involvement of the agents in Sánchez's forced disappearance. The entire police force, composed of thirty-six members, were called in for questioning. On January 7, a state judge ordered an extension of the legal detention of 13 policemen to thirty days. Bravo confirmed that the extension was made in order to continue investigating them. The policemen were kept together because authorities believe that they were responsible by omission or for actively participating in Sánchez's kidnapping. "There is evidence that the policemen did not do what they were supposed to do. Had they done their task, they could have prevented [Sánchez] from being seized from his home", Bravo said. He added at a press conference that DNA, dental, and anthropometric investigations were made on the cadavers found in the central region of Veracruz to see if they matched Sánchez's profile. Bravo said that one of the corpses, located on January 5 in the municipality of Soledad de Doblado, was possibly Sánchez's, but that it was physically unrecognizable because it bore signs of torture. When it was discovered, the body had been decomposing for 36 to 48 hours. Bravo said authorities would not discard or confirm Sánchez's status until the investigations issued results. The forensic specialists who worked on identifying the bodies also worked on the bodies found in the case of the mass disappearance of 43 students in Guerrero in late 2014. On January 10, however, Sánchez's son confirmed that none of the corpses found corresponded to his father's.

On January 12, Cruz Reyes went to the Attorney General's Office of Veracruz in Xalapa for questioning and to issue his declaration on the case. He went with the PAN's State President José de Jesús Mancha Alarcón, congressman Domingo Bahena Corbalá, and his lawyer, Sergio Rodolfo Vaca-Betancourt Archer. The mayor's attendance was invitational and voluntary; however, because he had political impunity under the Constitution of Mexico. Bravo clarified that the PGR and the federal government can strip the mayor from political immunity without any restrictions. Municipal officials claimed that the mayor was seen sporadically at work for least three days because he had attended several meetings related to the case. In the declaration, Cruz Reyes stated that he was not involved in organized crime and that he had nothing to do with Sánchez's disappearance. He said that he had no differences with him, citing that the relationship between them was good and cordial. In addition, Cruz Reyes lamented that the case was politicized. That next day at a press conference, the mayor stated that authorities were using him as a scapegoat. He asked authorities to be impartial and consider other lines of investigations too, like his publications on social media that reported about self-defense groups in Medellín de Bravo.

== Confirmation of death ==
On January 24, 2015, the corpse of Sánchez was found by Mexican authorities inside a plastic bag in Manlio Fabio Altamirano, Veracruz. Sánchez's throat was cut open by his kidnappers and was decapitated while still being alive. Then his body was mutilated into pieces, placed inside a plastic bag, and abandoned at the location it was found. Authorities had arrested Clemente Noé Rodríguez Martínez, a former municipal police officer and alleged drug trafficker, along with five other people the day before. They confessed to have participated in the kidnapping and murder of Sánchez, and directed authorities to the victim's location. The corpse was identified after investigators hydrated the fingers and matched the prints with the ones they had on file. The corpse was unrecognizable, but his son stated that the visible characteristics did not match his father's. He expressed doubts that the corpse belonged to Sánchez and asked authorities to provide DNA results.

During the police interrogation, Rodríguez Martínez stated that the deputy police chief of Medellín de Bravo, Martín López Meneses, who was also the mayor's chauffeur and personal bodyguard, ordered the abduction and murder of Sánchez. The attack, he said, was masterminded by the mayor Cruz Reyes. He also made reference to other policemen who participated in the murder, but name most of them by their aliases: "El Harry", "El Chelo", "El Moy", "El Piolín", and José Luis Olmos (alias "El Olmos"). Veracruz Attorney General Bravo confirmed at a press conference the following day that the kidnappers took Sánchez with the sole intention of killing him for reporting about violence in Medellín de Bravo. By killing him, the murderers were granted protection by López Meneses to operate in their drug dealing ring. The ring's activities had been interrupted a month before when Sánchez asked federal authorities to patrol the areas where they operated. Investigators concluded that he was killed the same day he was kidnapped.

On January 27, state authorities conducted DNA analyses and confirmed that the body was Sánchez's. His son stated that he wanted federal authorities to carry out analyses too because his family did not trust Veracruz authorities. On January 20, Sánchez's three brothers, Juan Carlos, Arturo, and Elías, told the media that after taking a look at the corpse with state authorities, they did believe it was his brother's. They said they were convinced after state authorities analyzed Sánchez's teeth, hands, feet, ears, and used a dental plaque to confirm his identity. The PGR confirmed through DNA analysis that the body corresponded to Sánchez on February 5. The results were issued to his family and to Article 19. The next day, authorities transported the body to Medellín de Bravo to hand it over to the family. That evening Sánchez's family held a wake at their home with their friends, neighbors, and members of the neighborhood's self-defense group. They built an altar for "Moy" (short for "Moisés"), as Sánchez was affectionately known by those close to him, lit candles, cooked tamales for those present, and led group prayers. In a short speech, his son thanked those present for attending and supporting Sánchez throughout the case.

== Legal proceedings against alleged perpetrators ==
A few days after Sánchez's body was located, state authorities stated that they wanted to strip the mayor of Medellín de Bravo, Cruz Reyes, from his constitutional political immunity in order to be legally processed like a regular citizen. The alleged killers of Sánchez accused him of masterminding the attack. The legal procedures against the mayor, however, would take up to a minimum of 25 days and require at least 34 votes in Veracruz's Congress, a supermajority. Once Cruz Reyes is officially notified of the charges against him, he will have to make an appearance in court and present his defense. The plaintiff will have up to ten days to review the defendant's side before ruling a decision and sending it to the State Congress. In a press conference on January 26, 2015, Cruz Reyes stated that Congress's insistence to strip him from his political immunity was not rooted in political or partisan interests. On Facebook, several people bashed Cruz Reyes on his page and called him a murderer. The mayor responded by saying that he did not kill Sánchez and did not mastermind the attack.

On January 29, one of the confessed killers, Clemente Noé Rodríguez Martínez, was formally charged by a Veracruz state court for murder. Given that it he was charged for murder, Rodríguez was held without bond. Two Medellín de Bravo police officers, José Francisco García Rodríguez and Luigui Heriberto Bonilla Zavaleta, along with López Meneses, transferred by state authorities to Veracruz for a hearing. All three of them denied their participation in the kidnapping and murder of Sánchez, but they decided not issue a legal declaration or answer any questions and exercise their right to remain silent as expressed in Article 20 of the Constitution of Mexico. According to a document read by the court secretary, Cruz Reyes and López Meneses were at a nightclub known as La Berrinchuda the day Sánchez was killed. The mayor was with his family and friends enjoying a concert by the banda group Calibre 50, while López Meneses and other policemen were outside guarding the premises. While at the concert, he mayor and the police were notified by the press secretary of the municipal government that Sánchez had been forcibly taken from his home, and that the journalist's family required police protection at their home.

García Rodríguez and Bonilla Zavaleta were at Tulipanes street in Gutiérrez Rosas neighborhood (where Sánchez lived) the moment the kidnapping occurred. They reportedly did not notice anything unusual and were eating hotdogs when the abduction took place. In fact, one of them sent a text message to her wife that he would pay one in advance for her. After that, both of them left to El Tejar and then to a park. As they patrolled the area, they were notified through radio that someone had been kidnapped in Gutiérrez Rosas and made their way back to the neighborhood. They interviewed a woman who said she was angry because she had called local authorities and no one had arrived, and that she had to call the Navy. García Rodríguez and Bonilla Zavaleta said they had seen Sánchez in person before and knew who he was, but that they had nothing to do with his abduction and murder. Both of them were charged with homicide and failure to fulfill a legal duty. García Rodríguez said that the government was using them as scapegoats. López Meneses, on the other hand, said he knew that Sánchez was a reporter who criticized the mayor and wrote about violence in Medellín de Bravo, but he also said he was innocent. He also told authorities that was not a deputy police chief in Medellín de Bravo. He said that a man known as Darío Vela was the one in charge of that position. On February 3, López Menses, García Rodríguez, and Bonilla Zavaleta, were officially charged by a Veracruz state court after authorities concluded that there were enough evidences to inculpate them. Because they were charged with homicide and failure to fulfill a legal duty, crimes considered grave under Mexican law, there were held without bond and imprisoned.

On February 11, Cruz Reyes asked for a 59-day leave of absence to the municipal government. The mayor asked for the absentia in order to "attend his legal issues and not disrupt his municipal duties". The petition was granted and Betsabé Solís Neri, a municipal administrator, became the interim mayor.

=== Case against Omar Cruz Reyes ===
With 35 votes in favor and 13 against, the Congress of Veracruz stripped the political immunity of Omar Cruz Reyes, the mayor of Medellín de Bravo, on March 26, 2015. With this legal action, authorities were legally able to investigate him and issue an arrest warrant. The congressmen concluded that there were enough evidences to prosecute Cruz Reyes, but he was still considered innocent until proven guilty. Cruz Reyes's defense, however, stated that they had plans to request a writ of amparo (effectively equivalent to an injunction) for congress's decision in the next fifteen days. They stated that there were several inconsistencies before giving the verdict. His lawyer stated that Cruz Reyes was in hiding somewhere in the state, but not in Medellín de Bravo. In accordance to law, Cruz Reyes can only return to office if he is found not guilty of the charges against him. Luis Gerardo Pérez Pérez, the mayor pro tempore, was expected to take his seat once Cruz Reyes's 59-day leave of absentia concluded.

On March 29, Pérez Pérez accepted the municipal duties and will start his post on April 11. Several people in Medellín de Bravo, however, protested against Pérez Pérez taking power. They claimed that when Cruz Reyes asked for a leave of absence, he did not take his place immediately. The protesters claimed that Pérez Pérez decided to re-accept the position for personal interests. Betsabé Solís Neri, who took Cruz Reyes's place during the absentia, was the municipal authority that the protesters requested to take power. Though she attended the protest and explained to some of them that she cannot legally keep functioning as an interim mayor, the protesters pledged to take over the city hall to prevent Pérez Pérez from carrying out his municipal duties.

== See also ==
- List of journalists killed in Mexico
- Lists of solved missing person cases
- Mexican drug war
