= San Rafael, Veracruz =

San Rafael Municipality
- City and municipality
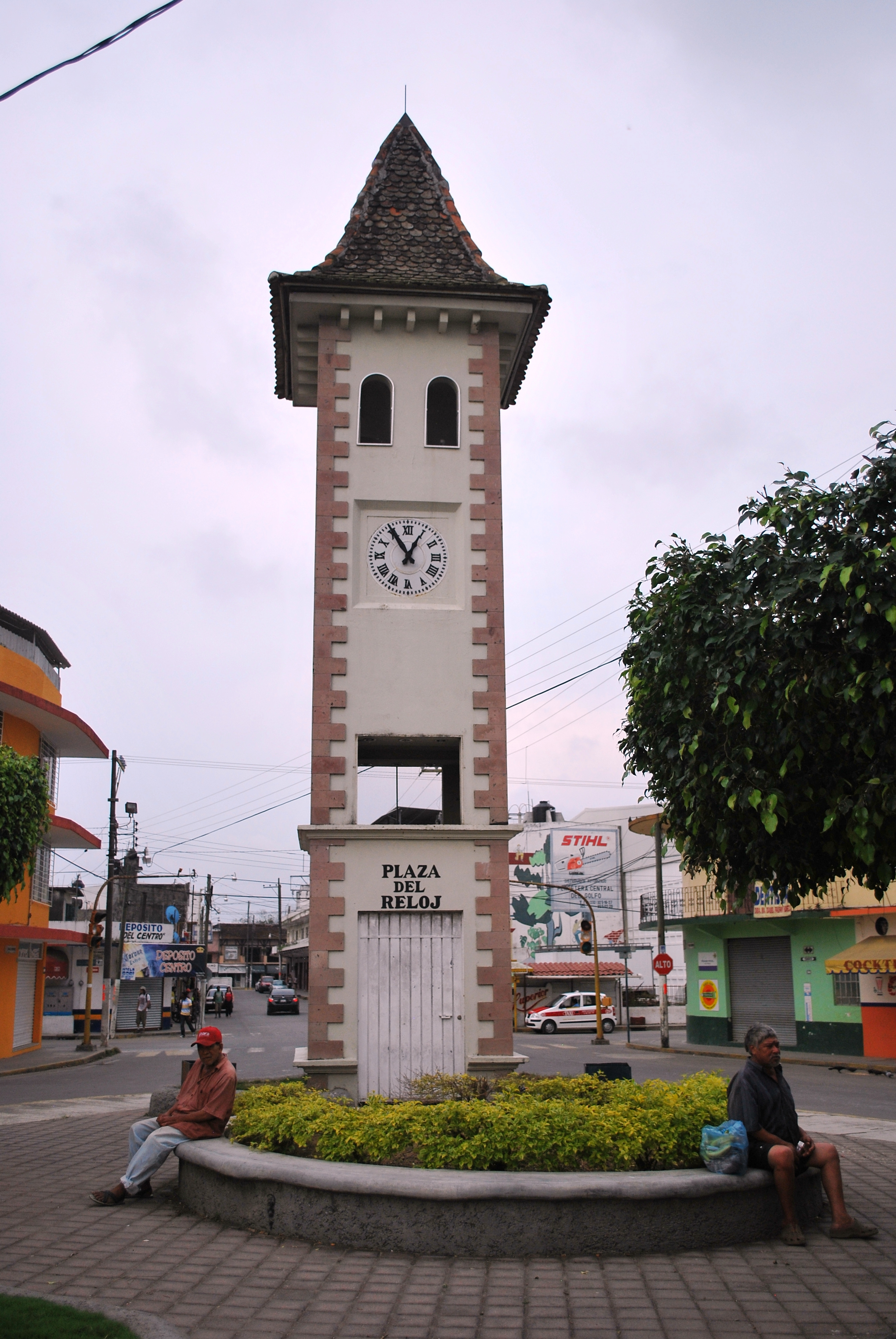
- French style clock tower at entrance of municipal seat

- Location in Mexico
- Coordinates: 20°11′20″N 96°51′57″W
- Country: Mexico
- State: Veracruz
- Region: Nautla Region
- Founded: 19th century
- Municipal Status: 2004

Government
  - Municipal President: Rogelio Martin Capitaine Dominguez

Area
  - Municipality: 106.11 km^{2} (40.97 sq mi)

Population (2020)
  - Municipality: 30,351
  - Seat: 6,838
- Time zone: UTC-6 (Central (US Central))
- Postal code (of seat): 93620
- Website: Web site

San Rafael Municipality is a municipality located in the Mexican state of Veracruz. The municipal seat is San Rafael, Veracruz.

The economy of the municipality is primarily based on the primary sector. It produces bananas, lime, vanilla and other agricultural products. There is also a small tourism sector based on the area's immigrant culture. In the 19th century there was a wave of settlers from eastern France. As a result of this, a type of vernacular architecture emerged in the region, sometimes called the casas de las riberas del río Nautla (riverside houses of the Nautla River).

== The town ==
The town of San Rafael was founded as part of a colonization effort by French immigrants in the first half of the 19th century. These French originally settled in Jicaltepec on the other side of the Bobos River, but local landowner Rafael Martínez de la Torre also offered them land on this side. Another indicator is French style names on some of the businesses, as well as a European style local bread sold in stores called "pan de agua." The entrance to the town from the highway is marked by the Plaza del Reloj (Clock Square). The monumental clock is relatively new but it was built in French style.

The San Rafael Museum is in front of the Plaza del Reloj and is dedicated to San Rafael's French history. It contains a collection of tools, utensils, photographs and more related to the immigrants as well as a room with pre Hispanic artifacts from the region.

The municipality celebrates the founding of the French colony on July 14. Two other local festivals include a summer carnival and a banana festival which occurs during Holy Week.

On the road to Poza Rica just outside town there is a statue of Don Quixote, marking the old Camino Real road, which still has a number of houses with their original roof tiles. More old houses of this type are found on another road called "Mentidero". In many of these houses live the descendants of the original immigrants. One of these houses is the Casa Stivalet, where the family of this name makes a living with fruit orchards, manufacturing fruit liquors and preserves. The descendants of these immigrants still make cheese and a type of bread locally known as "pan de agua." Much of the food served here is French influenced.

== Maison Couturier ==
Also just outside the town proper is the Maison Couturier hotel/resort, which calls itself a "pension agrícola" or "agriculture lodging." It was designed and opened by Carlos Couturier who had designed other hotels in the Colonia Condesa area in Mexico City. It originally was a citrus plantation owned by the Couturier family from Haute-Savoie in the 19th century. The main building keeps its French style but with modern updates. The food at the restaurants is French and most signs are also in the language. The hotel in the main building has a total of nine rooms all with private terraces and antique furnishing details. The property is still a working lime plantation. It has its own Cessna 206 aircraft that can transport visitors from Mexico City or Puebla to its own private airstrip. Other amenities include massages, private chapel, pool, in-house French movies, event hall for 120 people, and tours to a local archeological site and Jicaltepec.

== The municipality ==
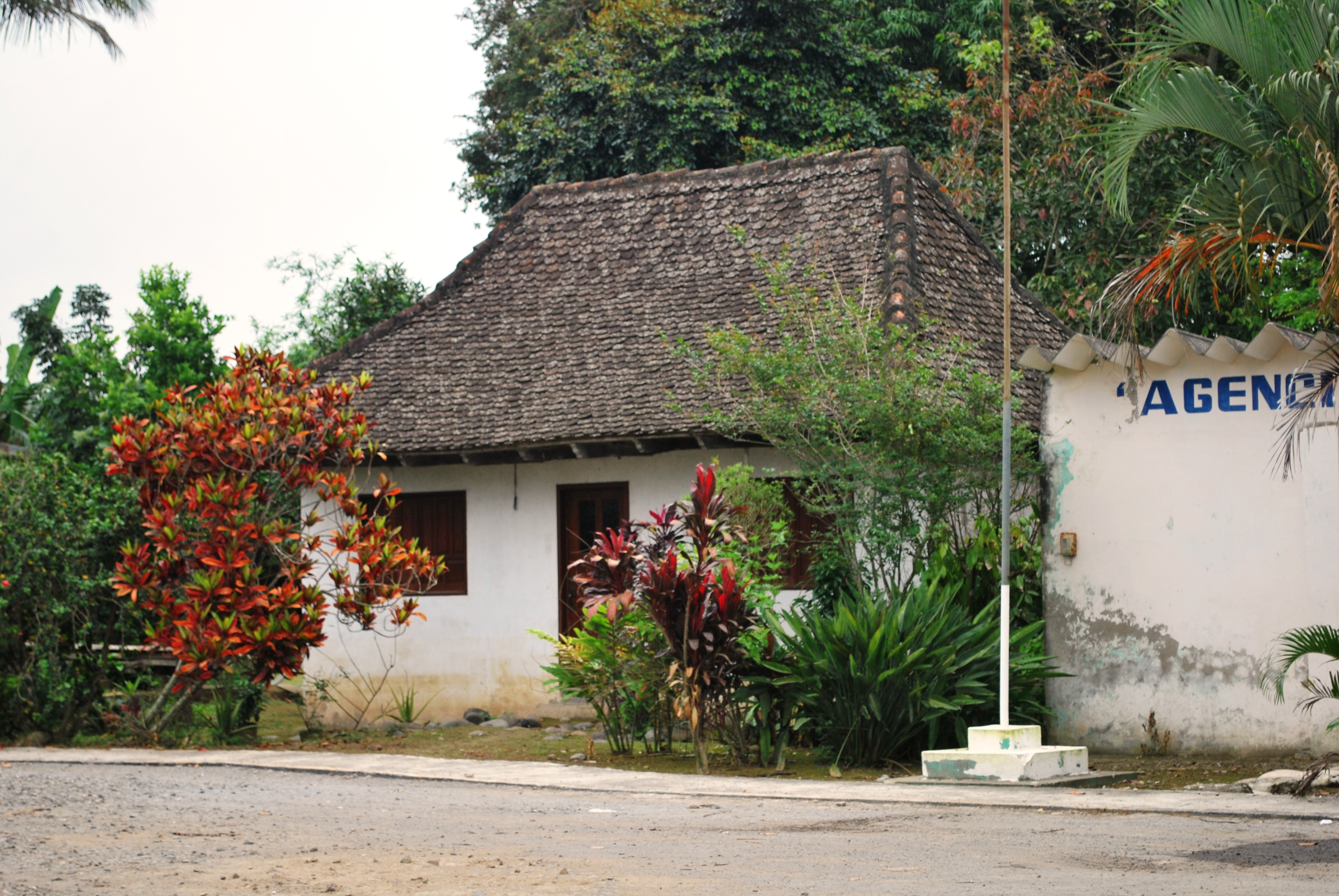
French style house in Paso de Telaya

As municipal seat, the town of San Rafael is the local governing authorities for various other communities, which cover a territory of 291.14 km^{2} (112.41 sq mi). This municipality is in the northern part of the Nautla region and borders the municipalities of Tecolutla, Martinez de la Torre, Misantla and Nautla. The municipal government consists of a municipal president, an officer called a síndico, one representative and various commissions such as for taxes, police and agricultural development.

French influence is found in most of these communities. Traditional dishes have French influence with homemade cheeses an important ingredient. Another element is the making of wine from various fruits including oranges, peaches, passion fruit and anona .

The most important community outside of San Rafael proper is Jicaltepec just across the Bobos River from the municipal seat. Jicaltepec was an old Totonac village, but it had been emptied by the Spanish who moved the Totonacs to other places. Today the community contains some of the most representative examples of the area's French architecture. As the first settlement site for the French, almost a third of its residents by the end of the 19th century were French. The main church is called the Purísima Asunción, which faces the town square without an atrium. There is also a community cemetery where many of the town's original immigrants are buried.

The Capitaine Drouaillet Family Museum is located on the Nautla-Jicaltepec road in a community called La Peña. It is the former home of the family now occupied by a descendant named Lourdes Drouaillet. The museum contains family belongings and others related to agriculture and cheese making in the 19th century along with documents relating the sister city relationship between Champlitte and San Rafael.

Paso de Telaya is a small community of under 500 people surrounded by banana fields. The center of this community has the Virgen del Carmen church built by French immigrants. Unlike Mexican churches, the stained glass windows do not have images of human figures because of French religious beliefs.

Other important municipal communities include Ampliación Manuel Avíla Camacho, Ampliación de Pavón, El Arenal, La Aurora, Bella Esperanza, Buenos Aires, El Cabellal, Calle Chica, Calle Grande, Cementeras, El Pital, El Cocal, La Chancha, Ejido Vega de San Marcos, Emiliano Zapata, El Faisán, Guadalupe Victoria, El Guayabal, Héctor Barrientos, Ignacio Zaragoza, La Isla, La Alguna, Mata de Plátano, El Ojilote, Oro Verde, La Pajarera, Las Palmas, El Paraíso and Tepetates.

== History ==
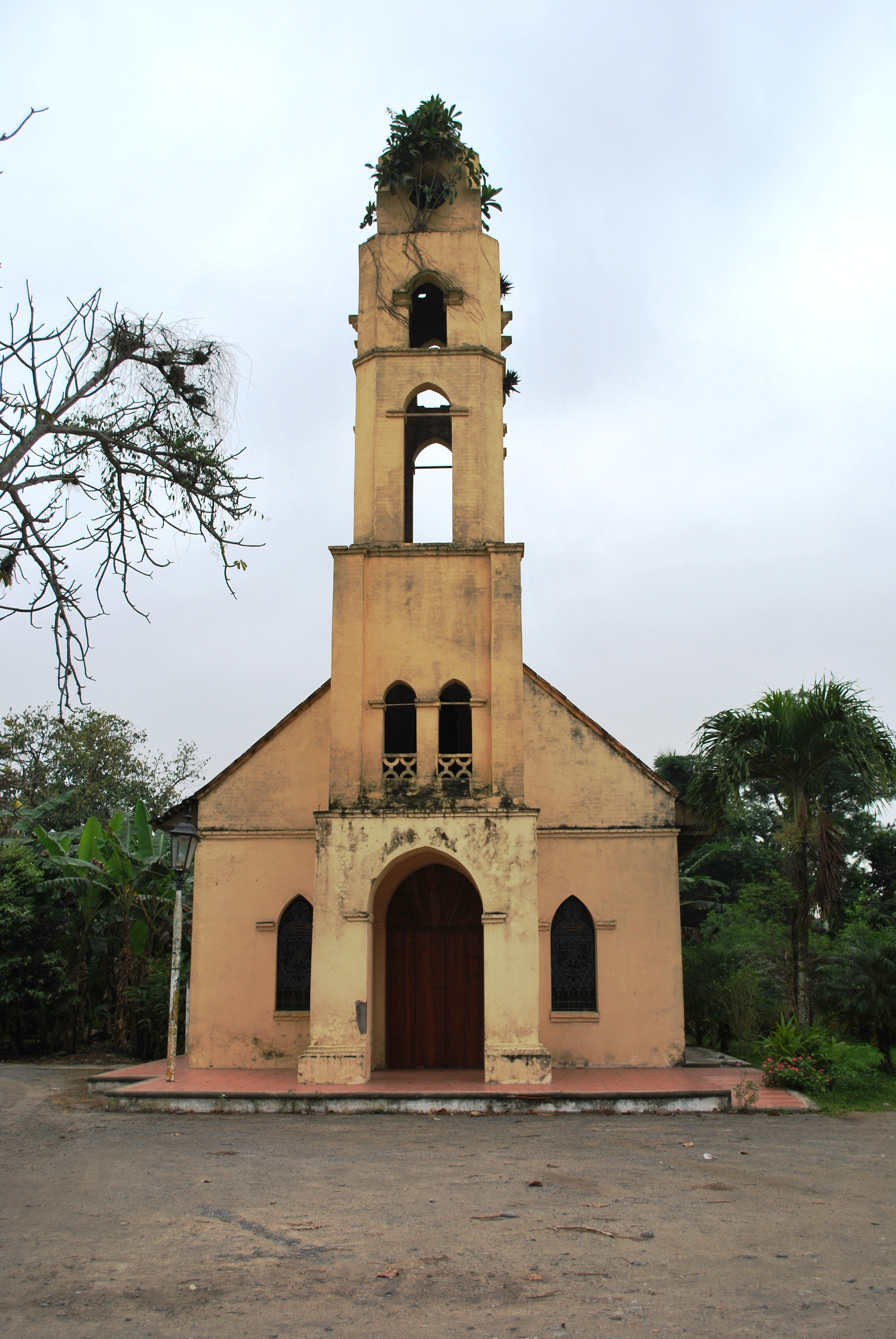
Virgen del Carmen church in Paso de Telaya

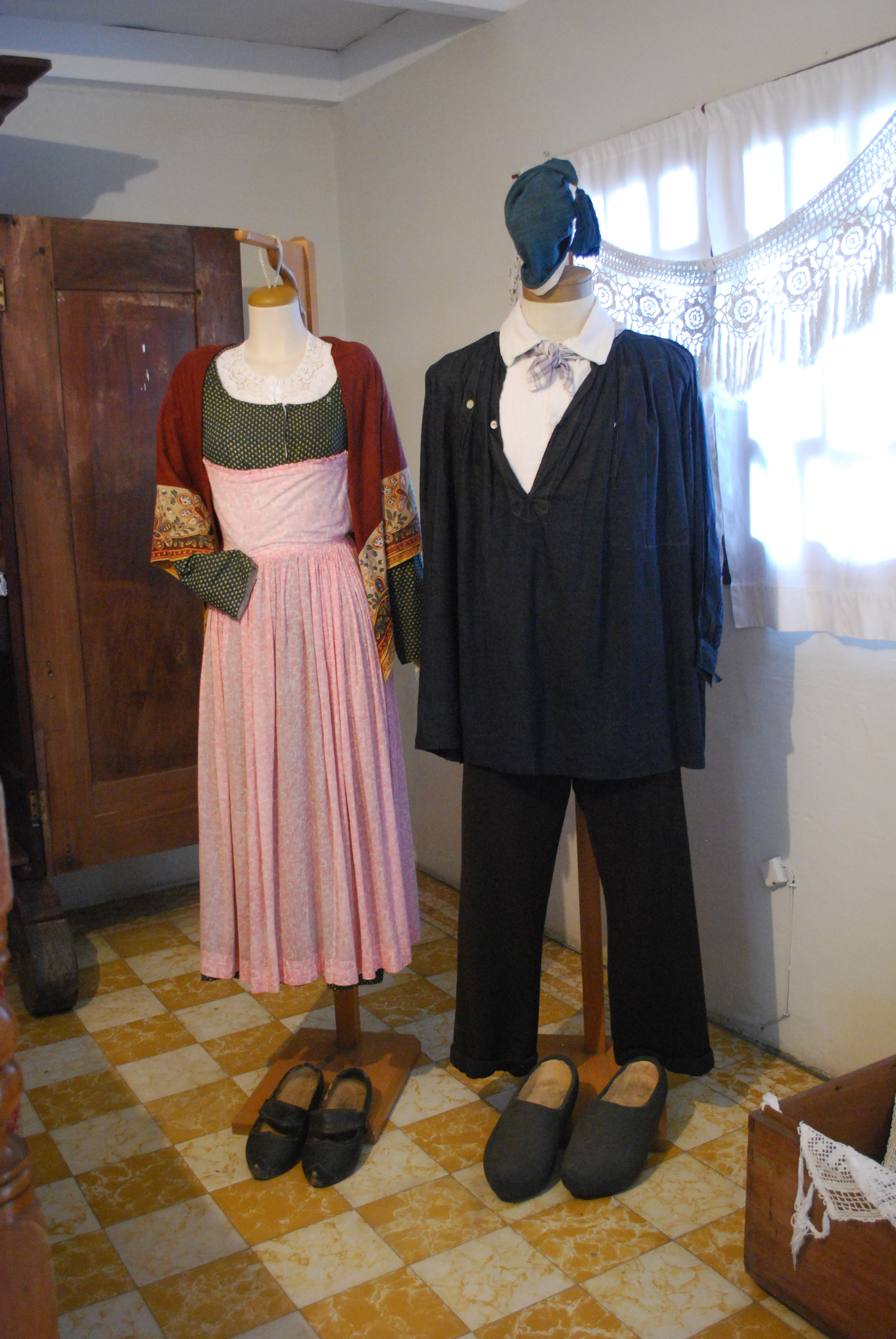
Exhibit of French colonists' dress at the San Rafael Museum

The city has its origins with French immigrants who came in the early 19th century. The immigrants principally came from Champlitte with others from Haute-Saône, Burgundy, Alsace, Savoy and the Pyrenees. They came in the first decades of the 19th century, drawn by false promises of a "paradise." They landed at the ports of Nautla and Jicaltepec and eventually populated the communities of Paso Largo, El Pital, Paso de Telaya, Paso de Novillos along with the main communities at Jicaltepec and San Rafael. The first group of French arrived in 1833 due to one of Mexico's first efforts to attract European immigration to Veracruz. These French also left because of political tensions in the region. The French were particularly courted by Mexico because of the high prestige the country had among Mexico's elite. This prestige held despite the Pastry War and the later French Intervention in Mexico during the 19th century. The colony was founded by the efforts of Stéphane Guénot, a former paymaster in the French army. While visiting Mexico he met another Frenchmen, Dr. Chabert, who convinced him to buy a large plot of land in Jicaltepec. He then went back to France and in 1833 convinced the first group of about 80 peasants and small farmers to head to the area. These came from the Burgundy and Franche-comté region, especially the village of Champlitte, in the Department of Haute-Saône. These immigrants came as entire families, with intentions of permanently staying, unlike a number of other immigrants to Mexico in the 19th century. Guénot's project was a collective farm but by 1835, this had failed and Guénot fled. Many others left too, but enough stayed on and decided to divide the land into private ranches to survive, but they remained a more-or-less isolated community in the Nautla region. For the next thirty years, the goal was survival, but from the mid 19th century the colony began to grow as they learned to exploit native crops such as corn and vanilla, with the latter exported to France. This brought in some later French immigrants to the colony, not all of which were from the original area in France. The colony grew as the French acquired more land and by the 1890s possessed about 23,000 hectares, with about one quarter cultivated and the rest pasture.

Rafael Martínez de la Torre, a Mexican landowner, offered land on the other side of the Bobos River to the French colonists, who then founded San Rafael, named after their benefactor.

There were three main waves of French to the area in the 19th century. By the late 19th century, the French colonists has economic and political clout, but the assimilation process was beginning as men began to drop French for Spanish for most business use and marriage with Mexicans began to be accepted. Bilingual French-Spanish education in San Rafael remained until the Mexican Revolution. The Revolution changed the community as foreign presence and especially land ownership was seen as a threat to Mexico, rather as something to help it develop, meaning that "being French" no longer had advantages. While they still held economic power and still were innovating, for example introducing banana production during this time, they needed to integrate more with the local mestizo elite in order to preserve their lands and businesses. Legal and family ties to Europe faded. By the mid 20th century, the use of the French language mostly disappeared despite some efforts to maintain it.

The area was part of the Martín de la Torre region from 1882 until 1930, when San Rafael became head of a municipality called Santiago de la Hoz, with the town's name changed to Manuela Acuña. However, within a year, the territory was reintegrated into Martínez de la Torre. It remained so until the current municipality of San Rafael was created in 2003.

These French introduced modern methods of pollinating vanilla to Mexico which they then exported to France for many years.

== Geography ==
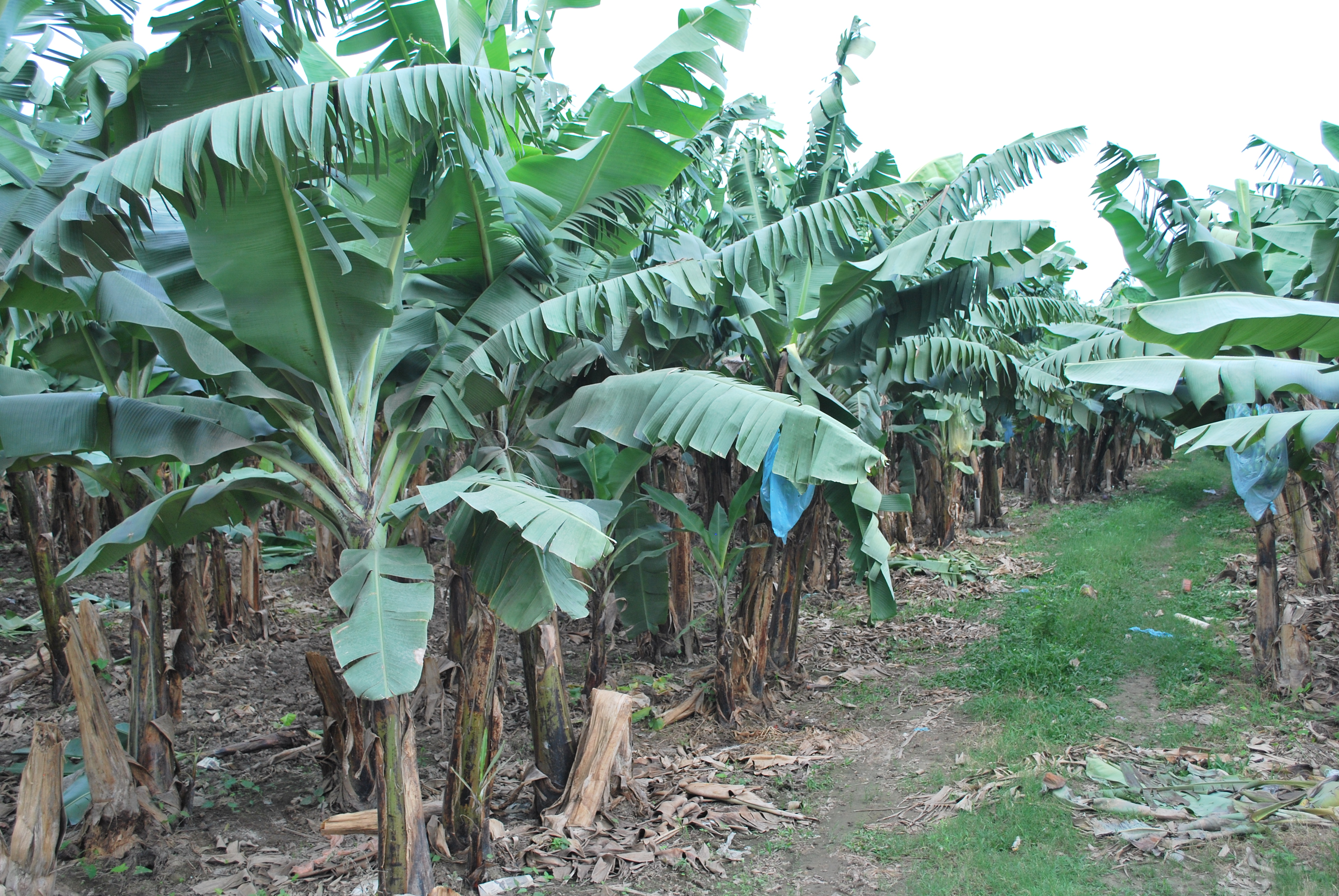
Banana trees at the Rancho La Duena

It is 285 km from Xalapa and 120 from Poza Rica near the Costa Esmeralda. The area is filled with hills, mountains, cattle pastures and banana fields. Most of the lands is under use for cultivation and pasture.

=== Hydrography ===
Its main surface water is the Bobos River. With heavy rain, the area is subject to flooding Major flooding occurred in 1999 with much of the population in shelters and food scarce. It also damaged citrus crops. Other significant flooding occurred in 2005 and 2009.

Water pollution is the main cause of environmental degradation in the municipality. This includes Poto Lake and the Bobos River. The municipality has partnered with the Universidad Autónoma Metropolitana to study and remedy environmental problems in the area.

=== Climate ===
The climate is hot and humid with an average temperature of 35C in the summer and 18C in the winter. Humidity is between 80 and 90% year round. There is rain year round, but it is especially heavy in September and October which can cause the Bobos to flood. From late summer to early fall, hurricanes are also possible. Average annual precipitation is between 106 and 153 cm. In winter, cold fronts called "nortes" can lower temperatures to near freezing.

== Economy ==
All the communities have at least some level of socioeconomic marginalization with 16 having a medium level and 27 having a high or very high level. The overall ranking for the municipality is medium. The area's main economic activities are agriculture and livestock. Most people in the municipality work in the primary sector growing citrus and bananas with some fishing.
