= Evaristo Ortega Zárate =

Mexican crime journalist who has been declared "missing" since 19 April 2010

- Disappeared: 19 April 2010; Xalapa, Veracruz, Mexico
- Status: Disappeared
- Known for: Investigative journalism

Evaristo Ortega Zárate (disappeared 19 April 2010) was a Mexican journalist who founded the Espacio and Diario Misantla, two local weekly newspapers based in the Mexican state of Veracruz. Though involved in journalism, he planned to run as mayor of Colipa, Veracruz in 2010 under the National Action Party (PAN).

He was known for his direct reporting style, and particularly for writing articles about organized crime, drug trafficking, political corruption, and government inaction. On 19 April 2010, Evaristo sent a text message to his sister saying that he had been forced into a police car in Colipa. He has been missing ever since.

== Career ==
Evaristo Ortega Zárate was born in the municipality of Colipa, Veracruz, Mexico in a small community of roughly 300 people known as Cerro del Tigre. He studied at the Universidad Pedagógica Veracruzana. In 2004, he and his friend Ángel Cruz started a newspaper, Espacio, in Misantla, Veracruz. About a year and a half later, Cruz died of stomach cancer but Evaristo continued to work in the newspaper they had created. By 2009, Espacio's popularity grew at a regional level and began to circulate in the capital city of Xalapa. His newspaper experienced various ups and downs because the printing costs for the publications were carried out at the Diario AZ newspaper and were paid straight from Evaristo's pocket. However, his investigative journalism, like his reports on corruption, politics, and societal issues, made Espacio popular among local readers and journalists. He also published articles about drug trafficking and organized crime, and criticized and investigated local politicians for their inactions. His direct reporting angered politicians and public functionaries because they were often the main subject of Evaristo's reports. He then tried to get his newspaper to circulate at a state level, but his project ultimately failed and he decided to concentrate in the area of Misantla. In Misantla, he also worked for the newspaper Diario Misantla, which he founded in 2007.

Though involved in journalism, he also expressed a desire to run as mayor of Colipa under the National Action Party (PAN) in 2010. He worked for the PAN in the campaigns of Irma Chedraui and Alba Leonila Méndez, who were running for Mexico's Chamber of Deputies.

== Disappearance ==
Evaristo was last seen by his colleagues at the headquarters of the PAN and having breakfast at the Crowne Plaza hotel in Colipa on 19 April 2010. Around noon that day, his sister Margarita received a text message from him saying that he had been taken into custody in a police car. "Alert everyone ... They've arrested us ... They have made us get into a police car," the text read. On 22 April 2010, the Veracruz state authorities ruled out the possibility that Evaristo was kidnapped by policeman under the rationale that he was not a well known journalist or public figure. They alleged that such an act of repression would only be reasonable if Evaristo was a "very important figure," and the authorities think that was not the case. However, press freedom organization Reporters Without Borders questions this decision and believes that Evaristo's disappearance may be linked to his political career, his profession as a journalist, or both.

== See also ==
- Mexican drug war
- List of journalists killed in Mexico
- José Antonio García (journalist)
- María Esther Aguilar Cansimbe
- Disappearance of Zane Plemmons
- Disappearance and displacement of Mario Segura
