= Disappearance and displacement of Mario Segura =

Abducted and displaced Mexican journalist

Mario Segura
- Born: August 23, 1961 (age 65); Mexico
- Disappeared: August 13, 2012 (aged 50); Tampico, Tamaulipas
- Status: Released
- Education: Universidad Autonoma de Tamaulipas
- Occupations: Former journalist, editor Clown
- Years active: ca. 1987–2012 (25 years)
- Employer: El Sol del Sur Tampico
- Known for: "Timely Alert" (Alerta Opurtuna) blog
- Title: Internet portal director

On 13 August 2012, Mario Segura (born August 23, 1961), a Mexican journalist who served as an editor for El Sol del Sur Tampico, a regional newspaper in Tampico, Tamaulipas, was abducted by a drug cartel. He was released a week later and was forced to relocate with his family to Mexico City, where he became a clown as he could no longer get a job as a journalist. Mario Segura is one of at least 30 Mexican journalists who have had to relocate because of threats and violence.

== Personal ==
Mario Segura lived in Tampico, Mexico. After his abduction, he moved with his family to Mexico City. While he eventually secured a dwelling for his family through a social housing program, this took eight months in Mexico City.

== Career ==
Mario Segura was a veteran journalist with around 25 years of experience.

At the time of his abduction, Segura was the Internet portal director for "El Sol del Sur Tampico", and he maintained the "Timely Alert" (Alerta Opurtuna) blog, which tracked drug-related violence and crime in the newspaper's coverage in the municipalities of Altamira, Madero, Ciudad Mante, Nuevo Laredo, and Reynosa. The blog allowed social networking comments from readers on its posts. By 2011, drug cartel violence against mass media had forced news outlets to hold back on how they reported about crime, corruption and drugs, and social media were filling in the vacuum. Segura said this blog was why he had been abducted and threatened.

After fleeing from Tampico, Segura could not get another job in journalism, and so he turned to being a clown for his income. Segura said he had already worked as a clown, calling himself "Papa Mayito", while living in Tampico as a supplement to his journalist's salary.

== Missing ==
Mentioned locations within Mexico relative to the capital Mexico City.

Mario Segura was abducted outside of his home in Tampico, Mexico, at 8 a.m. on 13 August 2012. Around 20 masked men came for him and then illegally confined and tortured him for about a week. Although Segura never named the cartel that was responsible for his abduction, Los Zetas, Gulf Cartel and Sinaloa Cartel all operate in the area. As a result, Segura closed his blog and fled with his family to Mexico City.

== Context ==
According to Article 19, an international press freedom NGO, the Mexican drug cartels are waging a "campaign against journalists" to intimidate them from reporting independently and around 30 journalists have been forced like Mario Segura to relocate. By the time Segura had been abducted, Mexico had already witnessed around 67 murdered journalists and about 14 disappearances since 2006, according to a special prosecutor for crimes against freedom and expression. Six journalists had already been killed in 2012. At that time, 50,000 people had been killed in almost six years of the Mexican drug war.

== Reactions ==
Jesus Robles Maloof, a human rights activist, is credited with publicizing the disappearance of Mario Segura by distributing a flyer with Segura's image over his Twitter account after 5 days. The Inter-American Press Association followed with a statement urging authorities to investigate the abduction. At the time, dual American and Mexican citizen Zane Plemmons was still missing.

== Awards ==
- Defender of Liberty and Promoter of Progress Award (2011)

For his directorship at El Sol del Sur Tampico, Segura was granted the following awards and recognitions:

- Jewel of Liberty Award (2011)
- Recognition from the Universidad del Norte de Tamaulipas (2012)

== See also ==
- Disappearance of Zane Plemmons
- Evaristo Ortega Zárate
- José Antonio García (journalist)
- List of people who disappeared
- María Esther Aguilar Cansimbe
- Mexican drug war
