= Tlapacoyan =

City and municipality in Veracruz, Mexico

- City and municipal seat
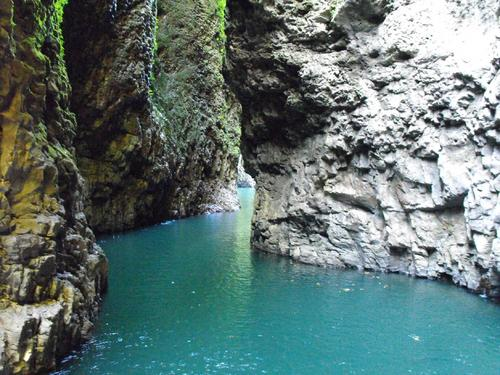

- Coat of arms

- Location in Mexico Tlapacoyan (Mexico)
- Coordinates: 19°57′42″N 97°12′39″W
- Country: Mexico
- State: Veracruz
- Region: Nautla Region

Area
  - Total: 168 km^{2} (65 sq mi)

Population (2020)
  - Total: 85,915
  - City seat: 35,893

Tlapacoyan is a city and municipality in the Mexican state of Veracruz. It is located about three hours by automobile away from the state capital Xalapa.

In 2020 Tlapacoyan registered 61,377 inhabitants.

== Tourism ==
=== Places to visit ===
Filobobos is a nearby natural reserve area for exploring nature. The river and rapids lead through a series of caves and beautiful interior waterfalls, and locals at the river entrances arrange short or longer guided rafting adventures through the caves.

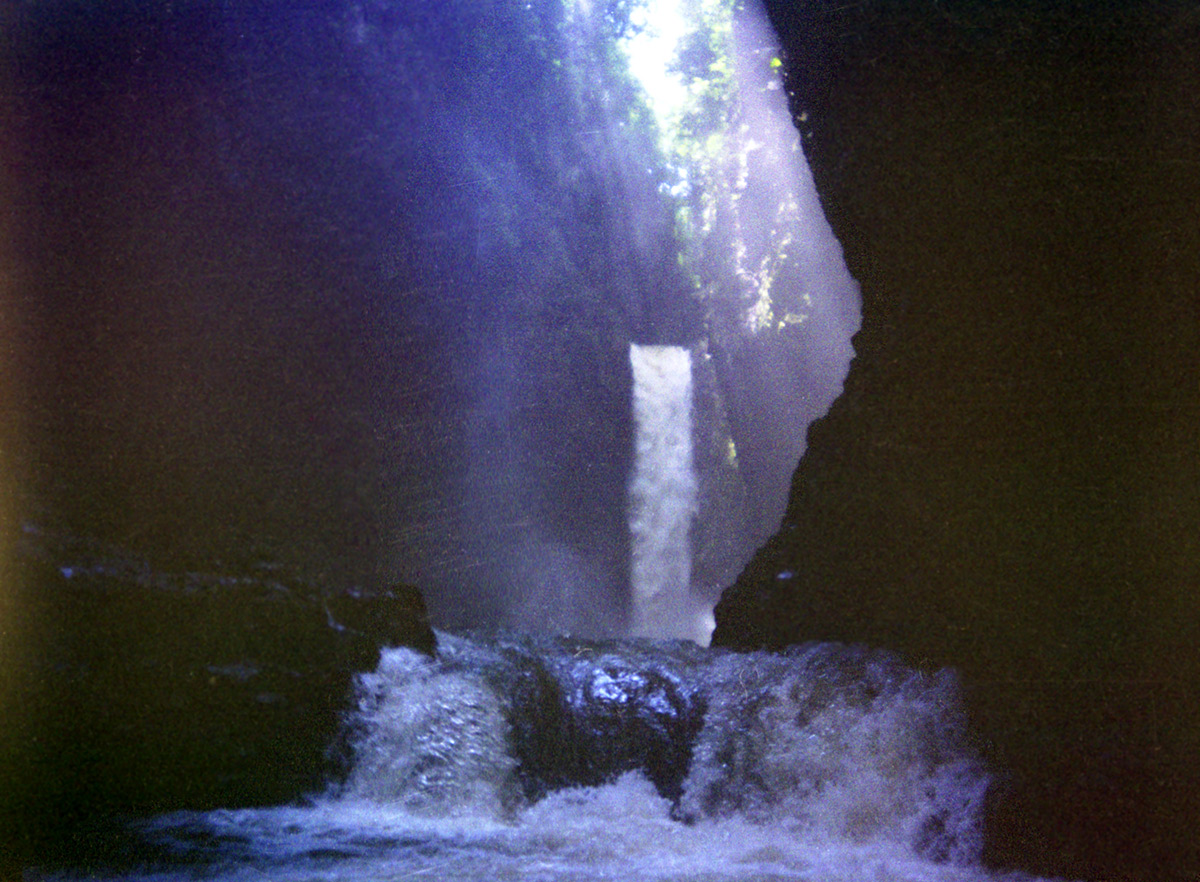
Filobobos waterfall cave
