= List of storms named Jose =

The name Jose has been used for eight tropical cyclones worldwide: six in the Atlantic Ocean, one in the West Pacific Ocean, and one in the South-West Indian Ocean.

In the Atlantic:

- Tropical Storm Jose (1981) – short-lived and weak storm that did not impact land
- Hurricane Jose (1999) – Category 2 hurricane that caused moderate damage in the Lesser Antilles
- Tropical Storm Jose (2005) – formed very close to Mexico, made landfall hours later as a weak tropical storm
- Tropical Storm Jose (2011) – formed south-southwest of Bermuda, dissipating two days later
- Hurricane Jose (2017) – long-lived hurricane that brushed the Lesser Antilles as a strong Category 4 hurricane and later brought heavy rain and rough surf to the East Coast of the United States as a tropical storm
- Tropical Storm Jose (2023) – strong but small storm that was absorbed by Post-Tropical Cyclone Franklin

In the West Pacific:

- Typhoon Halong (2014) (T1411, 11W, Jose) – a Category 5 super typhoon that enhanced monsoonal rains in the Philippines but remained off-shore and later made landfall on Shikoku, Japan, as a minimal typhoon.

The name was retired by PAGASA from future use in the region after that one use, and replaced with Josie for the 2018 Pacific typhoon season.

In the South-West Indian:

- Tropical Storm Jose (1964) – a weak tropical storm that had minor effects on land.
