= Hurricane Jose (2017) =

Category 4 Atlantic hurricane

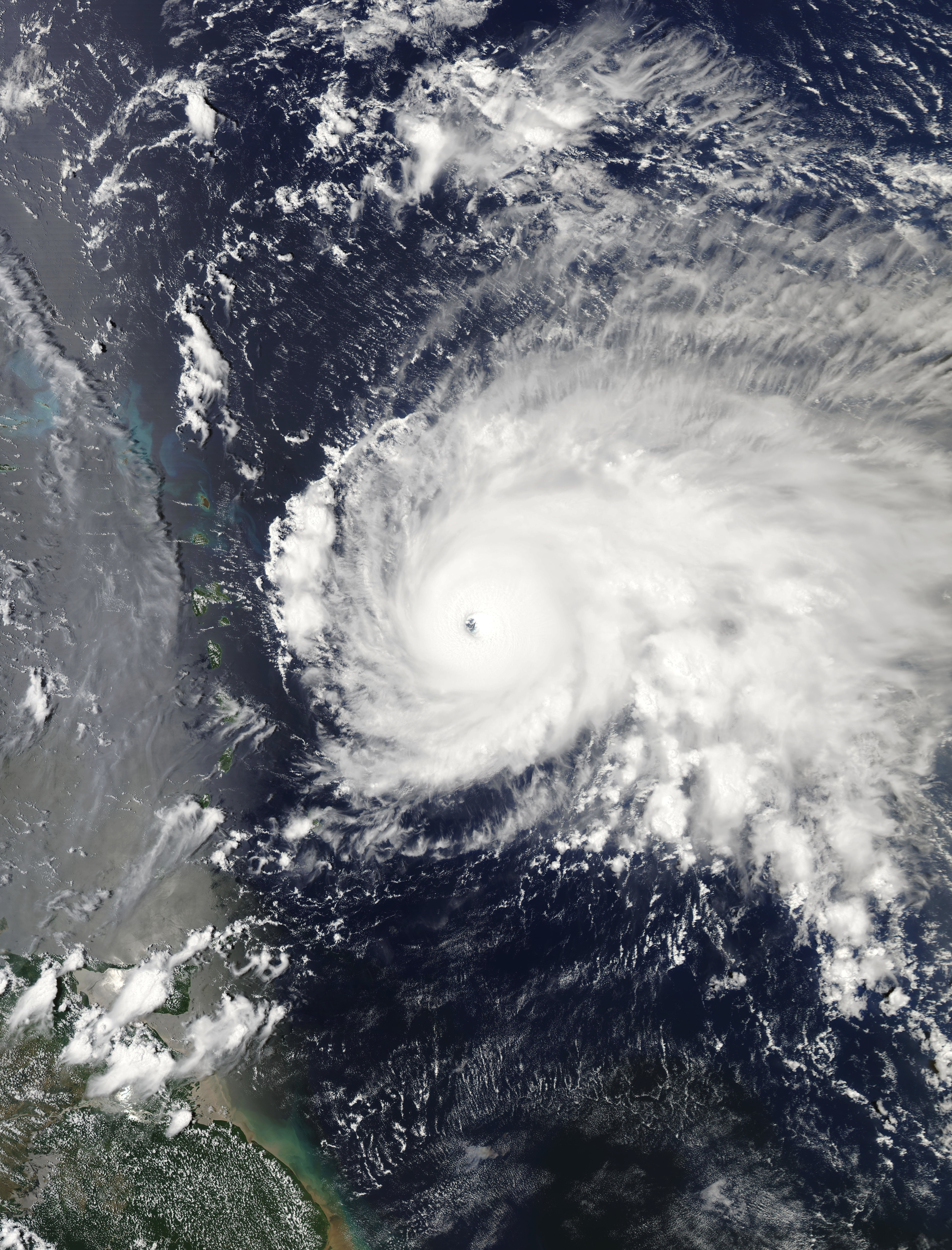
- Hurricane Jose at peak intensity nearing the Leeward Islands on September 8

Meteorological history
- Formed: September 5, 2017
- Extratropical: September 22, 2017
- Dissipated: September 25, 2017

Category 4 major hurricane
- 1-minute sustained (SSHWS/NWS)
- Highest winds: 155 mph (250 km/h)
- Lowest pressure: 938 mbar (hPa); 27.70 inHg

Overall effects
- Fatalities: 1 total
- Damage: $2.84 million (2017 USD)
- Areas affected: Leeward Islands, Bahamas, Bermuda, United States East Coast, Nova Scotia
- IBTrACS
- Part of the 2017 Atlantic hurricane season

Hurricane Jose was a powerful, erratic, and long-lived tropical cyclone, the longest-lived since Hurricane Nadine in 2012. Jose was the tenth named storm, fifth hurricane, and third major hurricane of the 2017 Atlantic hurricane season. It originated from a tropical wave that left the west coast of Africa, and developed into a tropical cyclone on September 5, first as a tropical depression and quickly strengthening into a tropical storm. A period of rapid intensification ensued on September 6, when Jose reached hurricane intensity. On September 8, it reached its peak intensity as a high-end Category 4 with 1-minute sustained winds of 155 mph. However, due to wind shear, it weakened over the next few days as it completed an anti-cyclonic loop north of Hispaniola. Despite weakening to a tropical storm on September 14, Jose managed to regain hurricane intensity the next day as it began to curve northward. Never strengthening above Category 1 status for the remainder of its lifespan, Jose degraded to a tropical storm once again on September 20. Two days later, Jose degenerated into a post-tropical cyclone as it drifted northeastwards off the coast of New England. By September 26, Jose's remnants had dissipated off the East Coast of the United States.

Initially projected to impact the Antilles already affected by Hurricane Irma, Jose triggered evacuations in catastrophically damaged Barbuda, as well as in Saint Martin. Eventually, as Jose changed its path, its inner core and thus the strongest winds stayed offshore. Nonetheless, Jose still brought tropical storm-force winds to those islands. Later on, Jose brought heavy rain, swells, and rough surf to the East Coast of the United States, causing beach erosion and some flooding. A woman died after she was caught in a rip current in Asbury Park, New Jersey.

== Meteorological history ==
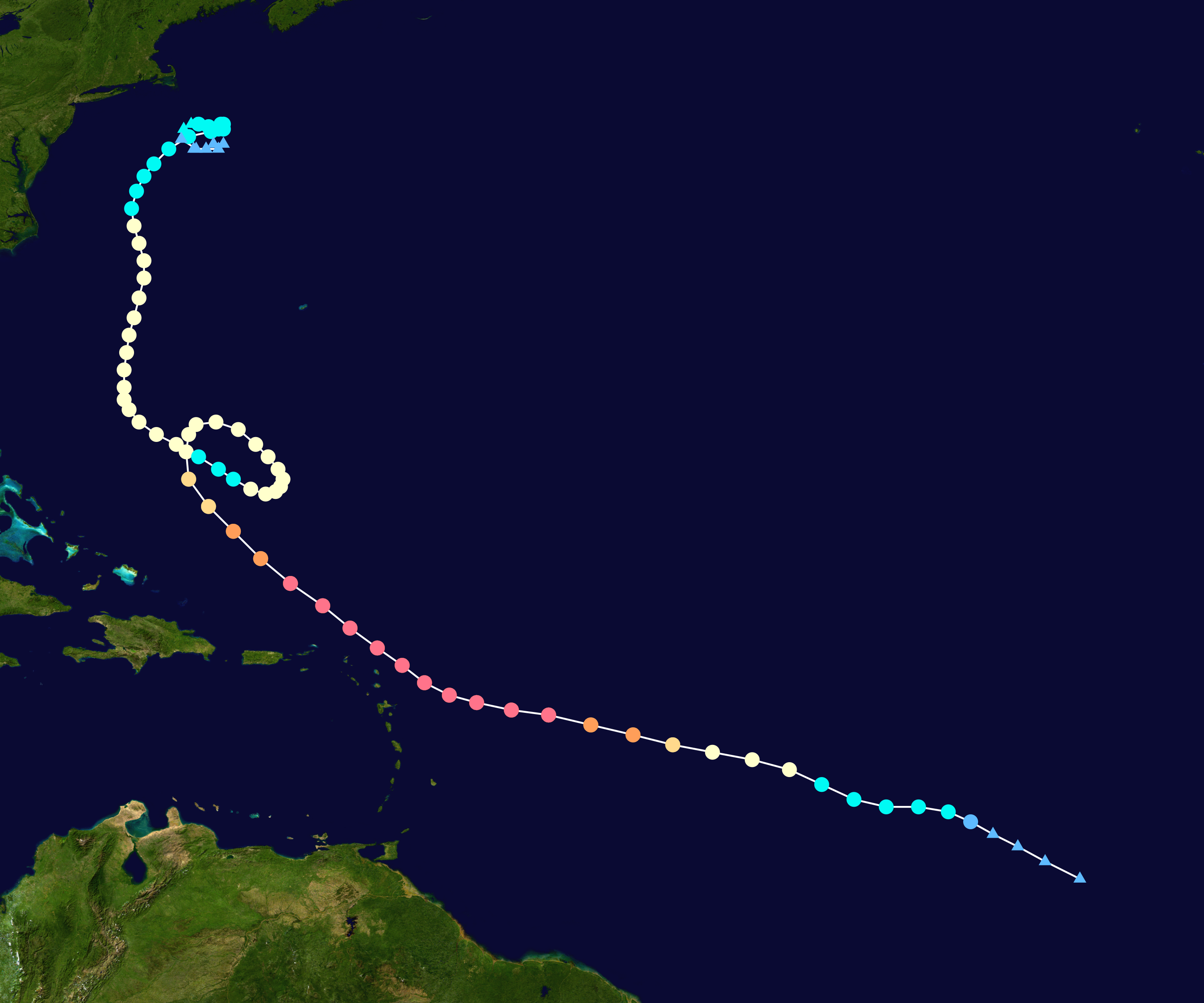
Map plotting the storm's track and intensity, according to the Saffir–Simpson scale Map key Saffir–Simpson scale Tropical depression (≤38 mph, ≤62 km/h) Tropical storm (39–73 mph, 63–118 km/h) Category 1 (74–95 mph, 119–153 km/h) Category 2 (96–110 mph, 154–177 km/h) Category 3 (111–129 mph, 178–208 km/h) Category 4 (130–156 mph, 209–251 km/h) Category 5 (≥157 mph, ≥252 km/h) Unknown Storm type Tropical cyclone Subtropical cyclone Extratropical cyclone, remnant low, tropical disturbance, or monsoon depression

On August 31, a westward-moving tropical wave exited the west coast of Africa. The wave passed south of Cape Verde on September 2, with a large area of disorganized thunderstorms. However, environmental conditions favored gradual development, which prompted the National Hurricane Center (NHC) to start tracking the system. Early on September 4, a surface low formed within the wave while located around 615 mi (990 km) west-southwest of the Cape Verde islands. Continued organization occurred, and it is estimated a tropical depression formed by 06:00 UTC on September 5, with intensification to tropical storm status occurring six hours later; as such, it was named Jose. Operationally, the NHC did not initiate advisories until 15:00 UTC that day as a tropical storm, nine hours after it had actually formed.

Once Jose became a tropical storm, gradual intensification ensued within the favorable environment of warm sea surface temperatures, low wind shear, and abundant moisture. The storm developed an eye-like feature and symmetric, radial convection as it tracked west-northwest under the influence of a subtropical ridge. Early on September 6, a period of rapid intensification ensued, due to the favorable conditions, with Jose attaining hurricane intensity by 18:00 UTC that day. Meanwhile, Jose, along with hurricanes Irma and Katia, marked the first time that three hurricanes were simultaneously present in the Atlantic since 2010. Despite being close to the outflow from the much larger Hurricane Irma to its west, Jose continued to quickly intensify over the next two days, which eventually culminated with it attaining peak winds of 155 mph (250 km/h) and a minimum pressure of 938 mbar (27.7 inHg) at 18:00 UTC on September 8, while located to the east of the Leeward Islands.

Jose slowly weakened as the eye became cloud-filled and wind shear began affecting the storm, dropping below Category 4 intensity by 18:00 UTC on September 10. The storm weakened below major hurricane status 06:00 UTC the following day, and below Category 2 status by 18:00 UTC September 11 as higher wind shear began to erode the core. As the storm was entering an anti-cyclonic loop, Jose was downgraded to a tropical storm at 00:00 UTC on September 15 based on Dvorak estimates which put its wind speed below hurricane strength. At this time the NHC noted that northerly wind shear had kept all significant banding to the southeastern quadrant and the center was to the northwest of most convection. However, as the storm was completing the anti-cyclonic loop later on that day, a reconnaissance plane recorded surface winds above hurricane threshold. Accordingly, the NHC re-upgraded Jose to a hurricane. Rounding the western periphery of the subtropical ridge, Jose moved northward, beginning on September 16. Despite an asymmetric appearance on satellite imagery, the hurricane intensified slightly, reaching a secondary peak intensity of 90 mph (150 km/h) at 12:00 UTC on September 17.

The wind field expanded as Jose continued northward, and a large convective band developed along the northern periphery as the central area of thunderstorms diminished. An area of convection and an eye feature reformed on September 19 while the storm was east of North Carolina. A Hurricane Hunters flight on September 20 indicated that Jose weakened to tropical storm status, by which time the storm turned to the northeast. Thereafter, the central convection diminished as the storm passed north of the Gulf Stream over cooler water temperatures. Early on September 22, the NHC redesignated Jose as a post-tropical cyclone, after convection had diminished for over 12 hours, and since the storm had acquired a frontal system. The northern convective band moved over New England while the center drifted southeast of Cape Cod. The remnants of Jose meandered around for another three days, before dissipating on September 25.

== Preparations and impact ==
=== Leeward Islands and Bahamas ===
Jose (right) strengthening while threatening the Leeward Islands during the first occurrence of three active Atlantic hurricanes since 2010. Hurricanes Irma and Katia can be seen to the left of Jose.

Hurricane Jose threatened the Lesser Antilles within days of catastrophic damage by Hurricane Irma, especially in Barbuda, which was 95% destroyed by Irma. The government of Antigua and Barbuda began efforts on September 8 to evacuate the entire island prior to Jose's anticipated arrival. Nine shelters housing 17,000 persons were opened on Barbuda. Women and children of Saint Martin attempted to flee the island, although men stayed. However, the inner core remained far offshore of the Lesser Antilles, sparing Antigua and Barbuda. Moist southerly flow across the United States Virgin Islands resulted in thunderstorm activity; some flooding occurred on Saint Croix, inflicting $500,000 in damage.

The government of the Bahamas shut down the Nassau International Airport and ordered evacuation from vulnerable Bahamian islands. On September 18 and 19, while passing far to the northwest of Bermuda as a Category 1 hurricane, Jose's outer bands produced wind gusts as high as 46 mph (74 km/h) and nearly 2.5 in (64 mm) of rain on the islands.

=== United States ===
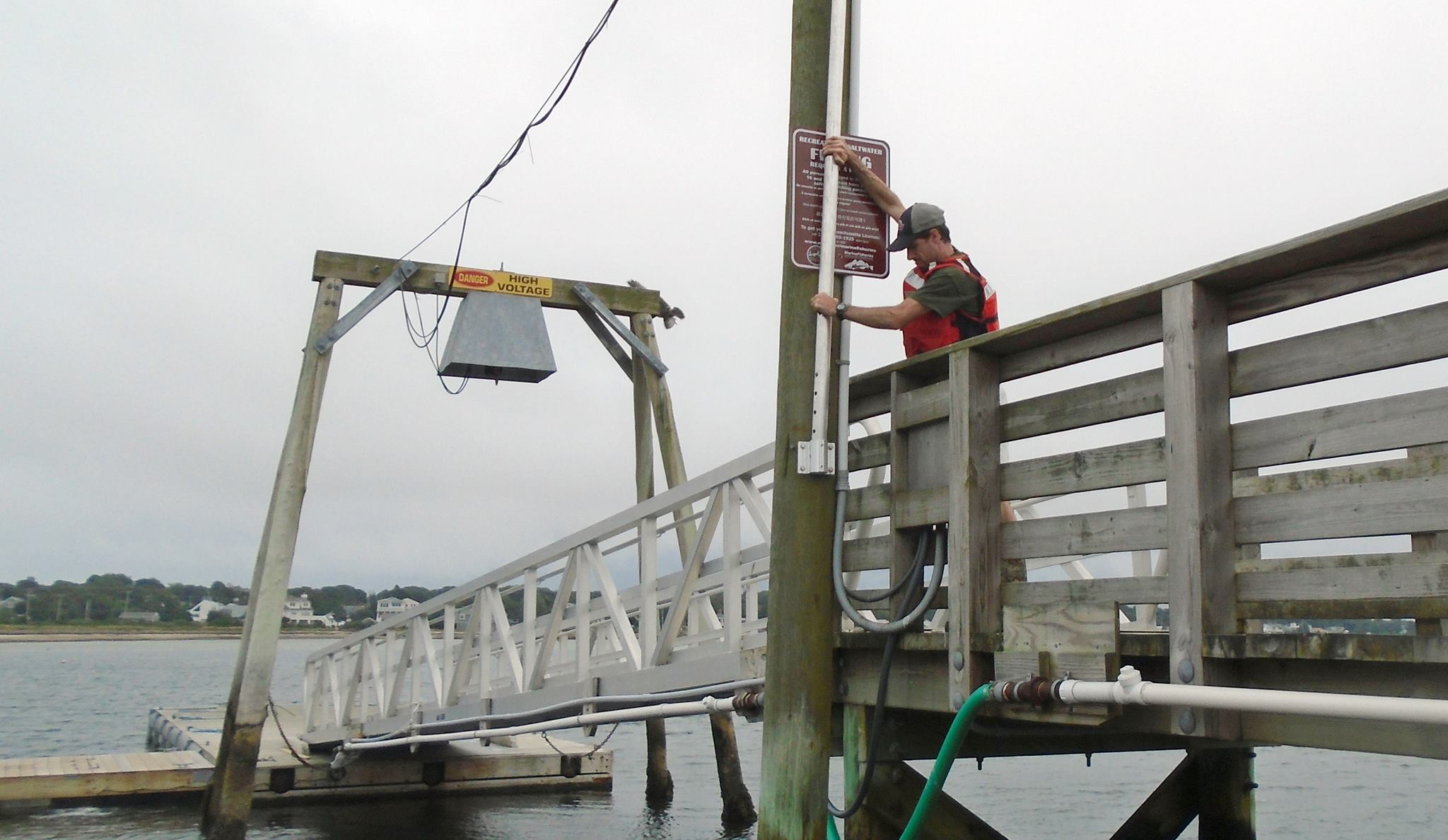
U.S. Geological Survey specialists installed 17 storm-tide sensors in Connecticut, Massachusetts, and Rhode Island.

In advance of the storm, U.S. Geological Survey specialists across three states installed 17 storm-tide sensors – seven in Connecticut, seven in Massachusetts and three in Rhode Island – along shorelines likely to receive some large waves and storm surge from the storm to collect information about the storm's effects. The NHC issued a tropical storm warning for portions of the Atlantic coastline, including the Outer Banks in North Carolina, through Delmarva and the Jersey Shore. Tropical storm warnings were also issued for Long Island, and the coastline of Connecticut, Rhode Island, and Massachusetts. Storm surge warnings were also posted for Nantucket, Massachusetts and parts of the Outer Banks.

On September 19, rough surf and swells from Jose flooded portions of the Outer Banks of North Carolina, causing road closures along sections of NC 12. Jose produced a storm surge along the Atlantic coast, with the highest rise recorded at 3.14 ft (0.96 m) in Wachapreague, Virginia. The storm brought heavy winds and rain to Ocean City, Maryland on September 19, with large waves and strong currents flooding a parking lot at the Ocean City Inlet. Sand erosion at Assateague Island National Seashore forced the closure of two parking lots, but had otherwise negligible effects. On September 19, waves from Jose breached a dune and flooded a portion of Delaware Route 1 in Sussex County, Delaware, forcing the road to be closed and traffic detoured. Large waves from Jose caused beach erosion along the Jersey Shore. In North Wildwood, waves from the storm went over a seawall and high tide caused street flooding along the bay. Damage in North Wildwood reached an estimated $2 million. Flooding from Jose shut down Ocean Drive between Avalon and Sea Isle City. One person was found unconscious after being caught in a rip current in Asbury Park; she died in the hospital the following day. Rough waters in the Long Island Sound and Block Island Sound forced many Cross Sound Ferry trips on September 20 to be cancelled.

While the storm meandered offshore, tropical storm conditions affected parts of coastal Massachusetts. On Nantucket, wind gusted to 62 mph (100 km/h), and rainfall at the airport reached 6.48 in (165 mm). Rough seas prompted suspension of ferry service to and from the island. Similar winds affected southern Martha's Vineyard. These conditions downed trees and power lines, disrupting travel and leaving more than 43,000 people without electricity. One tree fell on a car in Plymouth, and another struck a home and nearby shed in Norton. Overall damage was relatively light, amounting to $337,000.

== See also ==
- Weather of 2017
- Tropical cyclones in 2017
- Other storms named Jose
- List of Category 4 Atlantic hurricanes
- Hurricane Felix (1995)
- Hurricane Edouard (1996)
- Hurricane Earl (2010)
