= Digna Ochoa =

Mexican lawyer (1964–2001)

- Born: Digna Ochoa y Plácido; May 15, 1964; Misantla, Veracruz, Mexico
- Died: October 19, 2001 (aged 37); Colonia Roma, Mexico City, Mexico
- Cause of death: Assassination by gunshots
- Education: Universidad Veracruzana

Digna Ochoa (born Digna Ochoa y Plácido; May 15, 1964 – October 19, 2001) was a human rights lawyer in Mexico. During her career, Ochoa had represented some of Mexico's poorest constituents against government interests. On October 19, 2001, she was assassinated by unknown assailants inside of her office in Mexico City. Mexican state authorities initially declared her death a suicide, however amongst objections from human rights activists the investigation into her death was reopened in 2005. In 2021, Mexico admitted wrongdoing in the investigation of Ochoa's assassination.

== Biography ==
Digna Ochoa y Plácido was born in Misantla, in the state of Veracruz. Ochoa was a nun before she became a human rights lawyer.

Ochoa went to law school in the state capital, Xalapa, Veracruz, in 1984 and began working part-time for the Veracruz Attorney General's Offices in 1986. On August 16, 1988, while politically active with opposition groups, and after advising her family that she had found a "black list" of union and political activists at the office of her employer, she was abducted in Jalapa, Veracruz. Ochoa claimed that her abductors were state police officers and that she was raped. There was no investigation of her allegations. In 1991 she entered the Dominican convent of the Incarnate Word where she studied until 1999. She left without taking her vows.

In August 1999, Digna Ochoa was kidnapped and held in a car in Mexico City before being freed. In October 1999, Ochoa was kidnapped again in Mexico City and interrogated overnight. She was left next to an open cylinder of gas. Mexico City police investigated and the Inter-American Human Rights Court recommended protection for her.

In August 2000, she went into exile in Washington, DC, USA. While in exile, she was presented with Amnesty International's "Enduring Spirit" Award in Los Angeles by actor Martin Sheen.

In March 2001, she returned to Mexico City and in August 2001 court-ordered protection for her was lifted. She began work in law offices at 31-A Zacatecas Street in Mexico City on October 16, 2001. Her career involved representation of various dissidents and in some cases raised allegations of human rights abuses including torture by government authorities, particularly the army.

== Assassination and legacy ==
Ochoa was gunned down on October 19, 2001, at her office in the Roma district of Mexico City. At the time of her death, she was involved in the defence of peasant ecologists in Guerrero. Her body was found in the law office where she worked. A note was found by her body, warning the members of the human rights law centre where she had recently worked that the same thing could happen to them.

Several investigations followed her death. Although Mexico City officials initially ruled her death homicide, in March 2002 they ruled that it was suicide, a claim that was disputed by several senators. The autopsy report indicated that her body had two .22 caliber bullet wounds. Her death was caused by a gunshot to the head. The entry wound was on the left side. According to the coroner's report, the bullet passed through the skull from left to right on a slight angle from up to down and from back to front. The bullet remained embedded in her right temporal bone. Ochoa was right-handed. The other bullet entered Digna's thigh from front to back.

In 2002, Digna posthumously received the International Human Rights Award by Global Exchange, an international NGO based in San Francisco.

In 2003, Digna Ochoa posthumously received The Ludovic-Trarieux International Human Rights Prize awarded by European Bars.

== See also ==
- Human rights in Mexico
- List of kidnappings
- List of journalists killed in Mexico
- List of unsolved murders (2000–present)
