= Tokbergen Abiyev =

Kazakh journalist

- Born: Kazakh SSR
- Occupation: Journalist
- Known for: Staged abduction

Tokbergen Abiyev (Kazakh: Тоқберген Әбиев, Toqbergen Ábıev) is a Kazakh journalist. An editor of the paper Zakon i Pravosudiye, an Astana-based newspaper which specializes in documenting government corruption, he went missing on 20 December 2012, just hours after he announced to the Kazakh media that he had a sensational news report about to be published. Abiyev reappeared on 4 January 2013.

== Incarceration ==
Abiyev spent July 2008 to May 2011 in jail, after being convicted of bribing a representative of the Agency of the Republic of Kazakhstan for Fighting Economic and Corruption Crimes (Financial Police), with the intent of obtaining information on judicial law enforcement agents. He claimed his arrest was linked to his editorial position at Zakon i Pravosudie.

== Disappearance ==
On 20 December 2012, Abiyev sent an email to fellow journalists stating:

Dear Colleagues, Tomorrow, 21 December (…) an exclusive news conference will be held [with the title of] ‘A corrupt person must go to prison.’ You will not be disappointed. Your presence is expected.

He went on to explain the news conference, titled "The corrupt must be jailed" would expose despotism and corruption in Astana. At approximately 10 p.m., Abiyev told co-worker Andrey Taranov that he was leaving to collect information for the next day's event, and that he would soon return, but did not.

Reporters Without Borders stated that there was "little doubt" that Abiyev's disappearance was connected with the planned press release, and that they were "very worried" about the situation. The case was compared to that of his former colleague, Oralgaisha Omarshanova, who remains missing since 2007. She disappeared while investigating links between the murder of a fallen former manager of Kazakhmys and what the government claims was an unrelated mob attack on the family of his assailant.

== Reappearance ==
On 4 January 2013, Abiyev reappeared, stating that "he had staged his abduction in order to draw the attention of both the public and government to his fight against corruption."

== See also ==
- Human rights in Kazakhstan
- List of solved missing person cases (post-2000)
