= Zakon i Pravosudiye =

Zakon i Pravosudiye (Russian: Закон и правосудие, "Law and Justice") is a Russian-language Kazakhstani newspaper based in Almaty. It specializes in law and politics of Kazakhstan and investigating and publicizing government corruption. Several of its journalists have disappeared in mysterious circumstances; among them are Oralgaisha Omarshanova (disappeared March 30, 2007) and Tokbergen Abiyev (disappeared on December 20, 2012).

== See also ==
- Media of Kazakhstan
