= María Esther Aguilar Cansimbe =

Mexican crime journalist

- Born: ca. 1977
- Disappeared: November 11, 2009 (Age 32); Zamora, Michoacán
- Status: Missing
- Occupation: Journalist
- Employer(s): Notiver, "Cambio de Michoacán", and "Diario de Zamora" (newspapers)
- Known for: Coverage of drug-related violence in Mexico

The disappearance of María Esther Aguilar Cansimbe happened 11 November 2009 when the female newspaper journalist who worked for El Diario de Zamora and El Cambio de Michoacán in Michoacán, Mexico vanished. Her disappearance may or may not be linked to her coverage of the Mexican drug war but both Article 19 and Reporters Without Borders, two international press freedom organizations, have classified her disappearance as an act of enforced disappearance. She is one of four journalists and the only woman to have disappeared between 2006 and 2010 in the state of Michoacán where the drug war began.

== Personal life ==
María Esther Aguilar Cansimbe resided in Zamora, Michoacán, Mexico. She married police chief David Silva, a former public security director in Jacona, and had two daughters, ages eleven and thirteen.

== Career ==
María Esther Aguilar Cansimbe wrote for two Michoacán newspapers as a police reporter for El Diario de Zamora, which is an Organizacion Editorial Mexicana owned newspaper, and for the Morelia-based El Cambio de Michoacán' as its local correspondent.

Aguilar was a journalist for 10 years and as a police reporter for 4 years and often dealt with the criminal underworld and corruption in local government. In the months before her disappearance, she had reported on corrupt military and police officers working in conjunction with local criminal groups and the imprisonment of members of a Mexican drug cartel, which is known as La Familia Michoacana.

== Disappearance ==
Mentioned locations within Mexico relative to the capital Mexico City.

Aguilar disappeared on 11 November 2009. She left her home in Zamora after receiving a phone call from an unknown source. All phone calls made to Aguilar's phone later failed to connect. Days before her disappearance, she had published a story about the arrest of a local drug trafficker. After 72 hours, her family reported her as missing to the authorities. Prior to her disappearance, many of her colleagues were believed to have been bribed and intimidated by officials and drug traffickers to cease their investigative reporting. Aguilar, however, had continued to write her articles despite this.

== Context ==
The state Michoacán had become well known for its high levels of crime and government misconduct.

== Impact ==
She is one of thirty-two writers who have been murdered or declared missing after covering Mexican drug-traffickers. Aguilar's disappearance is one of many that has caused outcry from the several press freedom organizations. Her case has been classified as enforced disappearance. This is covered under the International Convention for the Protection of All Persons from Enforced Disappearance enacted by the United Nations General Assembly. The convention that has been ratified by 26 of 91 nations. She is one of at least 4 journalists from Michoacán alone that have been killed or reported missing in that state. Before Aguilar's disappearance, José Antonio García Apac went missing on 20 November 2006 and Mauricio Estrada Zamora disappeared on 12 February 2008. Five months after Aguilar's disappearance, Ramón Ángeles Zalpa, who also worked for the Cambio de Michoacán disappeared.

== Reactions ==
Within a week of her disappearance, the Committee to Protect Journalists had contacted authorities asking for their aid in safely locating Aguilar. Some journalists who had worked with her stated that her disappearance was directly related to her work. Jesús Montejano Ramírez, the local state prosecutor, told the Milenio newspaper that an investigation was being underwent but that he could not reveal the names of any potential suspects. The Office of the Special Prosecutor for Crimes against Journalists dependent on the Federal Attorney's Office was put in charge of this investigation.

== See also ==
- Mexican drug war
- List of journalists killed in Mexico
- José Antonio García (journalist)
- Evaristo Ortega Zárate
- Disappearance of Zane Plemmons
- Disappearance and displacement of Mario Segura
