= Disappearance of Zane Plemmons =

Mexican-American photojournalist who disappeared on 21 May 2012

Zane Plemmons
- Zane Alejandro Plemmons Rosales
- Born: born 29 March 1982; Mazatlán, Sinaloa, Mexico
- Disappeared: 21 May 2012 (age 30); Nuevo Laredo, Tamaulipas, Mexico
- Status: Missing for 14 years, 4 months and 3 days
- Citizenship: United States and Mexican
- Education: San Antonio College; University of Texas at San Antonio
- Occupation: Freelance photojournalist
- Employer: El Debate (Sinaloa)

Disappearance of Zane Plemmons, a Mexican-American photojournalist who does freelance work for the Sinaloa newspaper El Debate, occurred on 21 May 2012 in Nuevo Laredo, Tamaulipas, Mexico after covering a shootout.

Plemmons was last seen leaving from a hotel to photograph a shootout between rival drug cartels. He did not return from the scene and has been missing ever since.

The investigation into his disappearance is ongoing and the US Consulate there is tracking its progress.

== Early life ==
Zane Alejandro Plemmons Rosales was born in Mazatlán, Sinaloa, Mexico, and grew up traveling through the border that divides Mexico and California and Texas. His father was a former U.S. Marine, while his mother owns a hair salon near the city of San Antonio, Texas. Plemmons attended Medina Valley High School in Castroville, Texas, which is on the outskirts of San Antonio. From there, he went on to San Antonio College and the University of Texas at San Antonio.

Plemmons is a dual citizen of the United States and Mexico, and has epilepsy.

In 2009, Plemmons returned to his hometown to work in several jobs after living in San Antonio for several years. The following year, he began to work as a freelance journalist for several local newspapers, covering crime beats and writing articles on the poor living conditions of people who lived in the area. His work as a crime reporter, however, brought him some trouble; in 2010, alleged drug traffickers attacked the newspaper offices in Mazatlán, and gunmen left blood outside Plemmons' house. He moved back to San Antonio and lived with his family, after they had asked him to return. He made plans to revisit Mazatlán and see his family there then head to Costa Rica to visit more family and work on his blog before starting a new book project that he had signed up for.

== Career ==
While in Mexico, Plemmons worked as a freelance journalist and photographer, specializing in crime photography. He began his career writing for the English-language newspaper in Mexico called Mazatlan Pacific Pearl. Since then he had covered the Mexican drug war, particularly the doings of the Sinaloa Cartel in the criminal underworld, and worked for the Sinaloa newspaper El Debate prior to his disappearance.

== Disappearance ==
Plemmons was last seen at the Hotel Alamada in the city center of Nuevo Laredo. He had temporarily left the hotel to go cover a nearby shooting where Los Zetas were active. Hotel employees told San Antonio television station KABB-TV that a couple of anonymous, masked men came to gather all of Plemmons' belongings. Plemmons' family says that he had plans to visit relatives in Mexico after he left the shooting but never arrived by bus. El Debate has not heard from him since the shootout. According to Freedom House, Plemmons' case is the third instance of a journalist having disappeared in Mexico that year.

Mentioned locations within Mexico relative to the capital Mexico City.

== Context ==
News organizations across Mexico, including Nuevo Laredo, have muted their reporting of the Mexican drug war as a result of intimidation from violence, kidnapping, and murder of working journalists by warring drug cartels. For example, El Mañana has stopped its coverage of the drug war.

In Nuevo Laredo, Los Zetas struggle for control with the Gulf Cartel.

In addition, a travel warning issued by the US Department of State, Bureau of Consular Affairs, said, "(People) should defer non-essential travel to the state of Sinaloa except the city of Mazatlan where (they) should exercise caution particularly late at night and in the early morning."

Prior to Plemmons' disappearance, US journalist Mariano Castillo of the San Antonio Express-News was moved out of Mexico because of credible threats on his life.

== Impact ==
Plemmons was doing freelance criminal photography in the city of Nuevo Laredo when he went missing. Due to the escalating crime rate, Nuevo Laredo newspapers have temporarily ceased reporting on stories concerning organized crime.

== Reactions ==
Zane Plemmons' disappearance was reported widely in traditional and social media around Texas.

Plemmons' family, still uncertain of his location, believes his disappearance may be associated with the drug cartel. On 7 July 2012, his family held a candlelight vigil for Plemmons in a parking lot at Westover Hills Assembly of God. The vigil drew 80 people who came to share stories about Plemmons and be with his family.

On 22 May 2013, his family met one year after his disappearance. Plemmons' father said, "We haven't lost him. We've just misplaced him."

== See also ==
- Mexican drug war
- List of journalists killed in Mexico
- José Antonio García (journalist)
- María Esther Aguilar Cansimbe
- Evaristo Ortega Zárate
- Disappearance and displacement of Mario Segura
- List of people who disappeared
