= Jonathan Spollen =

Irish journalist

- Born: Leonard Jonathan Spollen; 1983; Ireland
- Disappeared: 3 February 2012 (age 28); Lakshman Jhula, Rishikesh
- Status: Missing for 14 years, 6 months and 29 days
- Height: 6 ft (1.8 m)

Leonard Jonathan Spollen (born 1983) disappeared on 3 February 2012 while working as a journalist for the International Herald Tribune newspaper; he was formerly Assistant Foreign Editor of The National in Abu Dhabi. He went missing from the northern Indian tourist attraction of Rishikesh, sparking an international campaign to locate him, which included his local TD, Eoghan Murphy, raising the issue in the Irish Parliament. It is believed by several analysts that he may have joined a cloistered and extreme Hindu religious cult. Others speculate that Spollen died in 2012, either as a result of drowning in the River Ganges, or after having been attacked by a wild animal.

== Biography ==
Spollen has worked on stories including the Iranian nuclear programme, the Hijab controversy in Ireland and the 2009 Iranian Elections. He read Philosophy and Politics at University College Dublin, before commencing postgraduate studies in 2004 focusing on the Near and Middle East at London's School of Oriental and African Studies.

== Disappearance and aftermath ==
Some commentators have speculated that Spollen may have fallen prey to a supposed condition increasingly described as the India syndrome, which shares similarities with the alleged form of spiritual hysteria known as the Jerusalem syndrome. Scott Carney, for example, states that Spollen: "fits the profile of the fervent young enthusiast of yoga, meditation, and Eastern thought who becomes lost—or worse—on a journey of spiritual self-discovery." However, this claim has yet to be substantiated.

Placing this within the history of negative perceptions of non-Western cultures said to be characteristic of much Western analysis as contended by Edward Said, Hammmerbeck further states:

"This point of view parallels Said and other critics’ rather orthodox Orientalism, a clear thesis/antithesis between home and foreign cultures with no possible synthesis. The foreign other, in this case the guru as embodiment of Hindu mysticism, functions as a negative of Western values, consistent with the approach that Said and others propose as being the historical epistemology of Orientalism."

On the fifth anniversary of his disappearance, the BBC News website published a major feature on Spollen, written by his former colleague and now BBC journalist Roland Hughes.

Spollen is still considered a missing person. Indian police and Irish authorities are calling for any information as to his whereabouts, with the former also reportedly investigating Spollen for breaching Indian visa regulations, in the event that he has remained in the country. Overstaying a visa carries a maximum penalty under The Foreigners Act, 1946 of five years imprisonment with a fine and subsequent deportation from India.

== See also ==
- List of people who disappeared mysteriously: post-1970
