= Oralgaisha Omarshanova =

Kazakhstani journalist

- Born: 1968
- Disappeared: 30 March 2007 (aged 39); Almaty Province, Kazatkom
- Status: Body discovered in 2021

Oralgaisha Omarshanova (Kazakh: Оралғайша Омаршанова, Oralğaişa Omarşanova) (1968 – went missing 30 March 2007) was a Kazakh journalist. She worked for the paper Zakon i Pravosudiye ("Law And Justice"), based in Astana. On 30 March she had secured a trip to Almaty Region to cover the clashes between Kazakhs and ethnic Chechens in the villages of Malovodnoye and Kazatkom, but never arrived. She had told a colleague previously that she had received threats by phone. She was last seen getting into a jeep in Almaty.

== Background ==
On 28 February and 7 March 2007, Omarshanova wrote two articles outlining her theories on whether the murder of Sagit Shokputov, an influential Jezkazgan-based businessman and manager of Kazakhmys, had any connection with his vilification by the state-controlled media shortly before his death.

According to the Kazakh government, on 17 March 2007, a mob of hundreds of Kazakhs in Malovodnoye and Kazatkom surrounded the Chechen Makmakhanov family at their home, demanding explanation for a quarrel the previous night in which one of the brothers shot a Kazakh in the leg. The brothers shot back from their windows, wounding nine Kazakhs and killing two. The mob then attacked and set fire to the structure, killing three members of the family. Most media coverage focused on the ethnic nature of the conflict.

As she had been covering the Shokputov story, Omarshanova was interested in the event as one of the Makmakhanov brothers—Vitta—had been charged for a businessman's murder, and was officially being held in Jezkazgan. Instead he was at home at the time, and not a victim of the killings, unlike his three brothers. She was also interested in the lack of a police response, as the event took hours to transpire.

== Events before disappearance ==
Omarshanova planned to investigate whether there was a connection. She claimed that Vitta was not the real murderer, and reported that another brother, Amir, had ties with Kazakhmys. The eldest brother, Khadzhimurat, was on the Kazakhstan Board of Judges; Shamil was in the oil business; and Nadhzmitdin worked for the Almaty Prosecutor's Office.

In April 2009, Kazakhstan's Ministry of Internal Affairs detained Serik Zhamanaev, whom they claimed to be a known criminal, for her murder.

== Death ==
Serik Zhamanaev confessed his killing of Omarzhanova in 2021. He pinpointed the exact location of her burial, and her remains have been found there.

== See also ==
- List of solved missing person cases (2000s)
