= Kazatkom =

Kazatkom Қазатком
- Village
- Location in Kazakhstan
- Coordinates: 43°34′50″N 77°43′39″E
- Country: Kazakhstan
- Region: Almaty Region
- District: Enbekshikazakh District

Population (2009)
  - Total: 634
- Time zone: UTC+6 (Omsk Time)

Kazatkom (Kazakh: Қазатком, Qazatkom) is a village in Almaty Region, in south-eastern Kazakhstan. Numerous clashes between Kazakhs and ethnic Chechens have broken out in the village, notably in March–April 2007.
