= Misantla =

City in Veracruz

- City
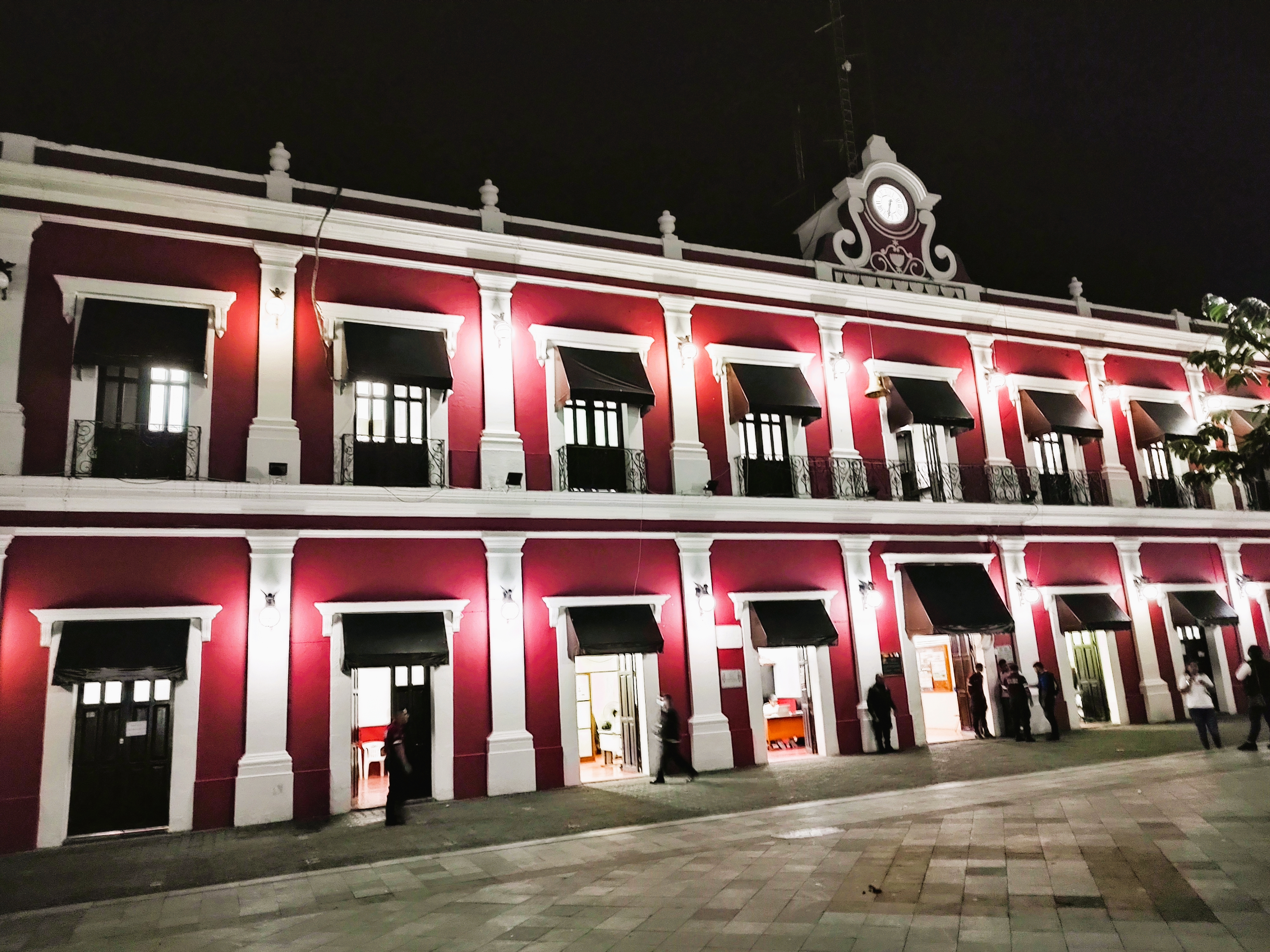
- Municipal palace at night

- Coat of arms

- Location in Veracruz Misantla (Mexico)
- Coordinates: 19°55′48″N 96°51′07″W
- Country: Mexico
- State: Veracruz
- Region: Nautla Region
- Municipality: Misantla
- Established: 1564

Population (2020)
  - Total: 30,232
  - Municipality: 65,761
- Time zone: UTC-6 (Zona Centro)
- Website: misantla.gob.mx

Misantla is a city in the Mexican state of Veracruz, the administrative seat of the municipality (municipio) of the same name. The municipality is bordered by Martínez de la Torre, Colipa and Papantla.

Misantla is located in the valley of the Misantla River in the Sierra de Chiconquiaco.

Travelwise, Misantla is about 35 km (22 mi) from the beaches of the Gulf of Mexico; however, the roads to the coast are not reliable. Misantla is located two hours north of Xalapa (the capital of the state) on Veracruz State Highway 65, a most scenic mountain route, well-paved. Federal Highways 180 and 129 are on either side of it. There are Mesoamerican pyramids located northwest of town.

It is the municipal seat of several different communities such as Morelos, Guerrero, el Pozón, Buenos Aires, Arroyo Hondo, etc. In the local Native American Totonac language it means "place of the deer", although there are no longer deer in the wild. Misantla is over 450 years old, it was founded by the Spanish conquistadors and the Native population. Weather in Misantla is very hot and humid. The main crops are coffee beans, oranges and corn. Misantla is not only an agricultural community but also people raise cattle for a living. In the city, vendors invaded the pretty streets with street commerce, thus street commerce is another very common activity.

Misantla is also known as La Tierra del Cachichin ("land of Cachichin"). Cachichin is a very sour, unpleasant nut which used to be abundant; nowadays, however, the nut is steadily disappearing.

== History ==
The region was originally populated by people of the Totonac culture, but in the late 1100s it was invaded by Chichimecs led by Mizantecuhtli/Mazatzintecuhtli, ruler of Huejotla. This was presumably the reason why there was a Nahua minority in the area in the sixteenth century. In 1486 it was conquered by Axayacatl and/or Nezahualpilli, and became the center of a strategic province of the Aztec Empire. Misantla paid tribute in liquidambar, which the people of Misantla carried to Tenochtitlan. The ruler of Misantla in 1519 was named Macuilcuauhhuitzli.

The people of sixteenth-century Misantla cultivated maize, beans, squash, beans, fruit, and cotton. Fish and fowl were also significant. There was evidently a large market here. Wild animals were bought and sold, including parrots, jaguars, monkeys, deer and turkeys.

The Chiconquiaco Codex that records in 1542 the settlement was founded to concentrate and evangelize the natives. On August 25, 1544, the tax that Misantla had to pay in the town of Xalapa was fixed. On January 20, 1564, the day of San Sebastián, the population of San Juan Misantla moved, by decision of the Franciscans who evangelized the region, from the old place to the new one, at the junction of the Palchán and Misantla rivers. Two of the first Catholic evangelists in the region were Toribio de Benavente Motolinia and Fray Buenaventura de Fuenlabrada, who lived in the town of Chapultepec. The new foundation was called Santa María de la Asunción Misantla, although the first church built was dedicated to San Sebastián, being destroyed by a fire in 1565. The population of the region declined significantly in the early colonial period.

Totonacs in the Misantla area as leading growers of high-quality vanilla pods dates from the eighteenth century.

The body of Baruch Pérez León, commander of the municipal police department, was found near the Martínez de la Torre garbage dump on January 29, 2021. Pérez León had been reported missing the night before, and there were indications he had been tortured before he was shot. Police commanders in San Juan Evangelista and Huatusco had been assassinated in February 2019 and May 2020, respectively.

== Notable people ==
- Digna Ochoa (1964–2001), human rights lawyer
