= Jaime Ayala (journalist) =

Peruvian journalist

Jaime Boris Ayala Sulca was a Peruvian journalist who disappeared in 1984, during the internal conflict in Peru. He was the Huanta correspondent for La República and hosted a program on a local radio station. He was last seen entering the Navy barracks in Huanta's football stadium, where he had gone to complain about mistreatment of family members by Navy troops. Ayala was 22 years old at the time.

Captain Álvaro Artaza was to be prosecuted for Ayala's disappearance, but he himself disappeared in 1986, shortly before his trial was set to begin. The navy told the court that Artaza had been kidnapped. Ayala's family believes that Artaza left Peru with the cooperation of the navy and is living abroad. A declassified US State Department cable from the time supports the idea that the navy was involved in Artaza's disappearance, stating "We believe that the navy probably carried out Artaza’s disappearance in order to avoid a civilian (and public) trial that would discredit that institution, and would establish a dangerous precedent."

Ayala's disappearance was discussed in the final report of the Peruvian Truth and Reconciliation Commission.

In 2022 Caretas reported that two other Navy officials would be charged in connection with Ayala's disappearance: Alberto Rivera Valdeavellano, Chief of Military Political Command of Huanta and La Mar; and Augusto Gabilondo García del Barco, leader of the Huanta counter-insurgency base.
