= Colipa, Veracruz =

Town in Veracruz, Mexico

- City
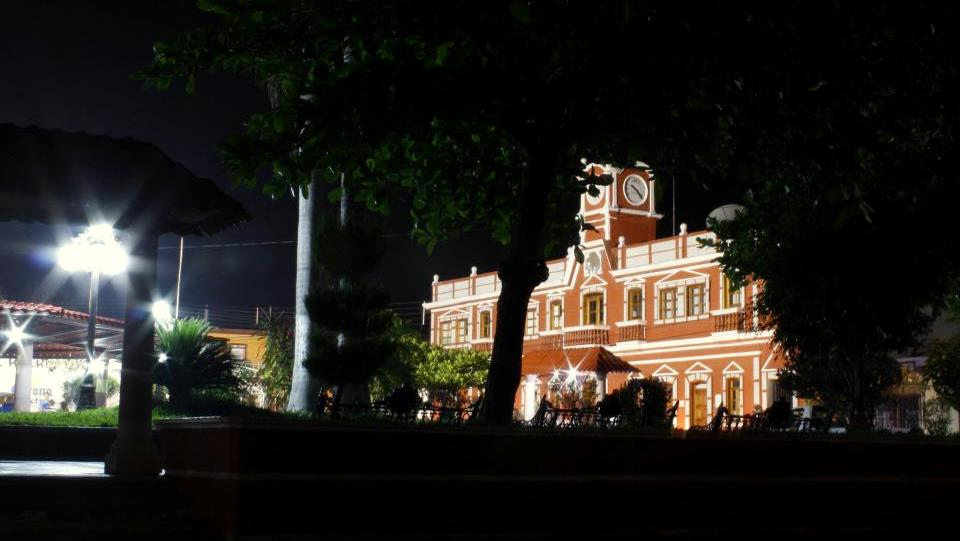
- Palacio municipal de noche

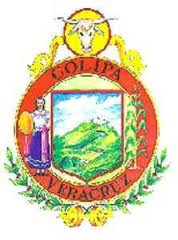
- Coat of arms

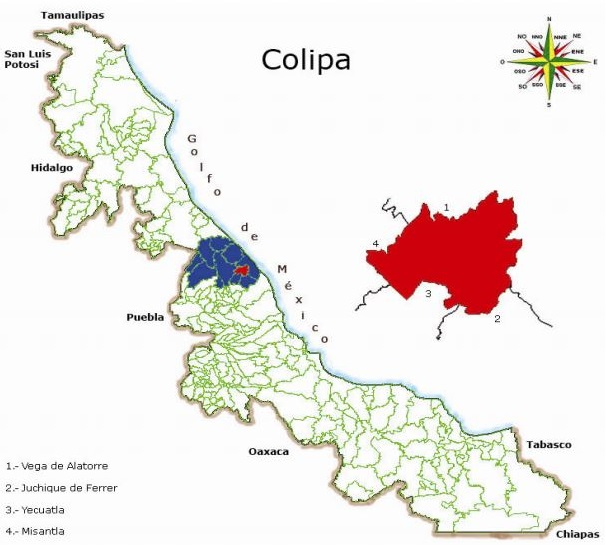
- Colipa municipality in the Nautla Region

- Location in Veracruz Colipa, Veracruz (Mexico)
- Coordinates: 19°55′26″N 96°43′37″W
- Country: Mexico
- State: Veracruz
- Region: Nautla Region
- Municipality: Colipa
- Elevation: 190 m (620 ft)

Population (2020)
  - Total: 2,482
  - Municipality: 5,743
- Time zone: UTC-6 (Zona Centro)

Colipa is a small town in the Mexican state of Veracruz. It has a population of about 3,000. The weather is generally hot and the rainy season runs from October through December.

It is located at 19°55' N, 96°42' W, less than 20 km from the Gulf Coast.
