= Martínez de la Torre =

- City and municipality
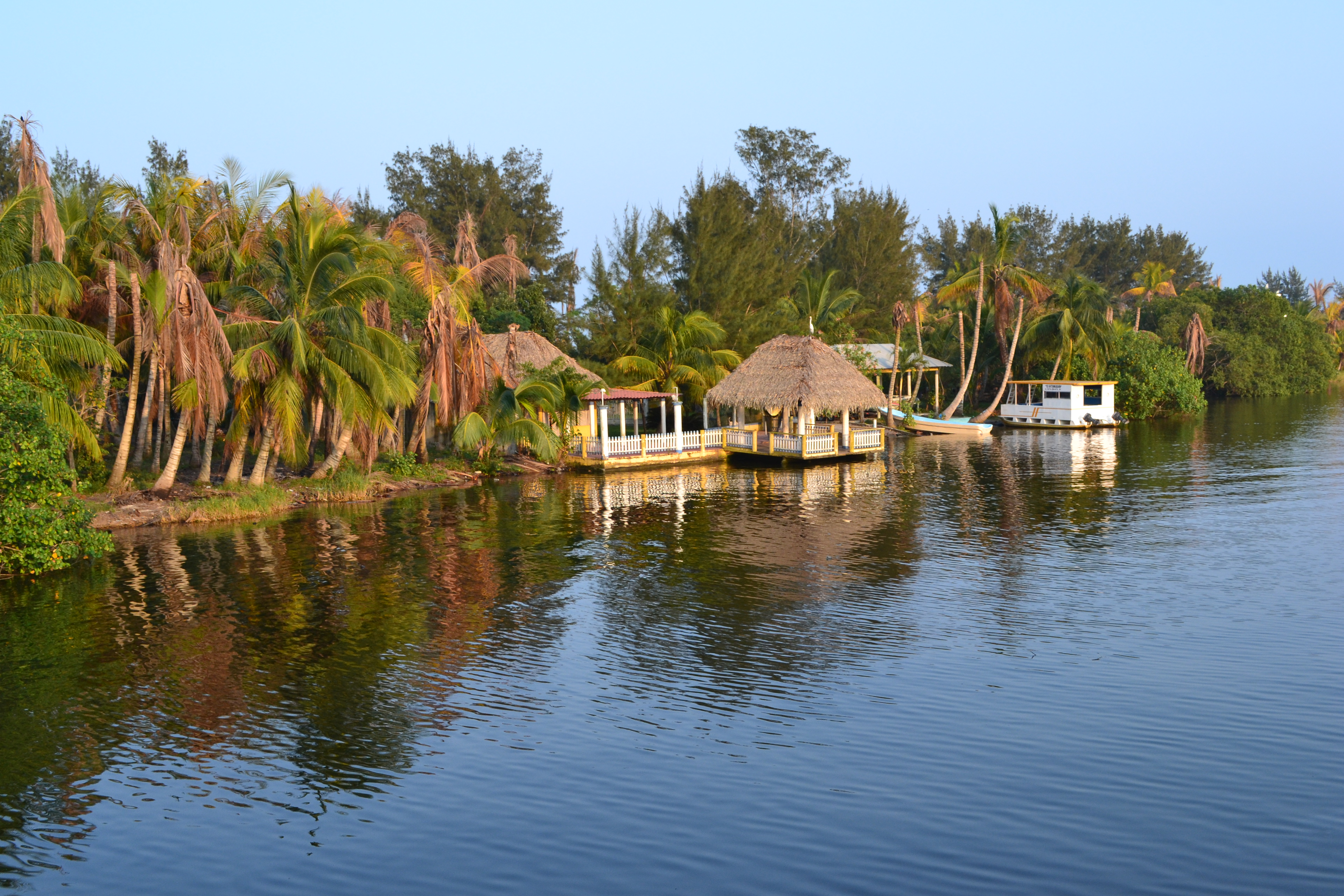

- Coat of arms

- Location within Veracruz Location within Mexico
- Coordinates: 20.060556°N 97.054167°W
- Country: Mexico
- State: Veracruz
- Region: Nautla Region
- Founded: 1882
- Elevation: 81 m (266 ft)

Population (2020)
  - Municipality: 108,842
  - Seat: 64,692
- Time zone: UTC-6 (Central (US Central))
- Postal code (of seat): 93600

Martínez de la Torre is a city and its surrounding municipality of the same name located in the central part of the Mexican state of Veracruz. The city had a 2020 census population of 64,692, while the municipality had a population of 108,842. There is a total area of 815.13 km^{2} (314.72 sq mi) in the municipality. The largest other community in the municipality is the town of Independencia.

Martínez de la Torre is on the Nautla River, also known as the Filobobos.
