= 2012 in Mexico =

- Decades: 1990s; 2000s; 2010s; 2020s
- See also: History of Mexico; List of years in Mexico; Timeline of Mexican history

This is a list of events that happened in 2012 in Mexico. The article also lists the most important political leaders during the year at both federal and state levels.

== Incumbents ==
=== Federal government ===
==== President ====
- President
  - Felipe Calderon PAN, until November 30
  - Enrique Peña Nieto PRI, starting December 1

==== Cabinet ====
- Interior Secretary (SEGOB)
  - Alejandro Poiré Romero, until November 30
  - Miguel Ángel Osorio Chong, starting December 1
- Secretary of Foreign Affairs (SRE)
  - Patricia Espinosa, until November 30
  - José Antonio Meade, starting December 1
- Secretariat of Agriculture and Rural Development (SEGARPA)
  - Francisco Javier Mayorga Castañeda, until November 30
  - Enrique Martínez y Martínez, starting December 1
- Secretary of Agricultural, Territorial and Urban Development (SEDATU)
  - Jorge Carlos Ramírez Marín(starting December 1)
- Communications Secretary (SCT)
  - Dionisio Pérez-Jácome Friscione, until November 30
  - Gerardo Ruiz Esparza, starting December 1
- Education Secretary (SEP)
  - Alonso Lujambio, until March 16
  - José Ángel Córdova, March 16-November 30
  - Emilio Chuayffet Chemor, starting December 1
- Secretary of Defense (SEDENA)
  - Guillermo Galván Galván, until November 30
  - Salvador Cienfuegos Cepeda, starting December 1
- Secretary of Navy (SEMAR)
  - Mariano Francisco Saynez Mendoza, until November 30
  - Vidal Francisco Soberón Sanz, starting December 1
- Secretary of Labor and Social Welfare (STPS)
  - Rosalinda Vélez Juárez, until November 30
  - Alfonso Navarrete Prida (starting December 1)
- Secretary of Welfare (SEDESOL)
  - Heriberto Félix Guerra, until November 30
  - Rosario Robles, starting December 1
- Tourism Secretary (SECTUR)
  - Gloria Guevara, until November 30
  - Claudia Ruiz Massieu, starting December 1
- Secretary of the Environment (SEMARNAT)
  - Juan Rafael Elvira Quesada, until November 30
  - Juan José Guerra Abud, starting December 1
- Secretary of Health (SALUD)
  - Salomón Chertorivski Woldenberg, November 30
  - Mercedes Juan López, starting December 1
- Secretary of Finance and Public Credit (SHCP)
  - José Antonio Meade, until November 30
  - Luis Videgaray Caso, starting December 1
- Secretary of Economy (SE)
  - Bruno Ferrari García de Alba, until November 30
  - Idelfonso Guajardo, starting December 1
- Secretary of Energy (SENER)
  - Jordy Herrera Flores, until November 30
  - Pedro Joaquín Coldwell, starting December 1
  - Comisión Federal de Electricidad (CFE)
    - Francisco Rojas Gutiérrez, starting December 1
  - Pemex
    - Emilio Lozoya, starting December 1
- Attorney General (PRG)
  - Marisela Morales, until December 4)
  - Jesús Murillo Karam, starting December 4
- Chief of Staff: Aurelio Nuño Mayer, starting December 4
- Coordinación de Comunicación Social de Presidencia (Coordination of Social Communication of the Presidency): David López Gutiérrez (starting December 1)
- Estado Mayor Presidencial (Presidential Security Staff): Rodolfo Miranda Moreno, (starting December 1)

=== Governors ===
- Aguascalientes: Carlos Lozano de la Torre PRI
- Baja California: José Guadalupe Osuna Millán PAN
- Baja California Sur: Marcos Covarrubias Villaseñor, PAN
- Campeche: Fernando Ortega Bernés PRI
- Chiapas
  - Juan Sabines Guerrero, Coalition for the Good of All, until December 7
  - Manuel Velasco Coello PVEM, starting December 8
- Chihuahua: César Duarte Jáquez PRI
- Coahuila: Rubén Moreira Valdez PRI
- Colima: Mario Anguiano Moreno PRI
- Durango: Jorge Herrera Caldera PRI
- Guanajuato: Miguel Márquez Márquez PAN
- Guerrero: Ángel Aguirre Rivero PRD
- Hidalgo: Francisco Olvera Ruiz PRI
- Jalisco: Emilio González Márquez PAN
- State of Mexico: Eruviel Ávila Villegas PRI
- Michoacán: Fausto Vallejo PRI
- Morelos
  - Marco Antonio Adame PAN, until October 1.
  - Graco Ramírez PRD, starting October 1.
- Nayarit: Roberto Sandoval Castañeda PRI
- Nuevo León: Rodrigo Medina de la Cruz PRI
- Oaxaca: Gabino Cué Monteagudo MC
- Puebla: Rafael Moreno Valle Rosas PAN
- Querétaro: José Eduardo Calzada Rovirosa PRI
- Quintana Roo: Roberto Borge Angulo PRI
- San Luis Potosí: Fernando Toranzo Fernández PRI
- Sinaloa: Mario López Valdez PAN
- Sonora: Guillermo Padrés Elías PAN
- Tabasco: Andrés Granier Melo PRI, until December 31, 2012
- Tamaulipas: Egidio Torre Cantú PRI
- Tlaxcala: Mariano González Zarur PRI
- Veracruz: Javier Duarte de Ochoa PRI
- Yucatán
  - Ivonne Ortega Pacheco PRI, until September 30
  - Rolando Zapata Bello PRI, starting October 1
- Zacatecas: Miguel Alonso Reyes PRI
- Head of Government of the Federal District
  - Marcelo Ebrard PRD, until December 4
  - Miguel Ángel Mancera PRD, starting December 5

== Events ==
- January 4 – Altamira prison brawl: Thirty-one killed and 13 injured in a Tamaulipas prison.
- February 7 – The Estela de Luz to commemorate the bicentennial of the Independence of Mexico is inaugurated in Mexico City.
- February 19 – Apodaca prison riot: Forty-four killed in a Nuevo León prison.
- March 20 - A magnitude 7.4 earthquake kills two and leaves 30,000 homeless in Oaxaca and Guerrero.
- March – Pope Benedict XVI visits Guanajuato.
- April 15 - Reports of superheated rock fragments being hurled into the air by the Popocateptl volcano. Ash and water vapor plumes were reported 15 times over 24 hours.
- April 20 – Álamo bus accident: Forty-three killed and 17 injured in an accident in Veracruz.
- April and May – 2012 Nuevo Laredo massacres, April 17, April 24 and May 4.
- May 3 – 2012 Veracruz murder of journalists: The bodies of two journalists were recovered in Veracruz on World Press Freedom Day.
- May 13 – Cadereyta Jiménez massacre: At least 49 people are killed in the Mexican drug war.
- June 9 – Miss Latin America 2012 won by Georgina Méndez Pimentel, 24, in the Riveria Maya.
- June 18 and 19 – 2012 G-20 Los Cabos summit
- August 12 – Edgar Morales Perez, PRI mayor-elect of Matehuala, San Luis Potosí, and his campaign manager were assassinated by unknown attackers.
- August 19: 2012 Michoacán murder of photographers
- December 9: 2012 Mexico Learjet 25 crash

== Elections ==
- 2012 Mexican general election
- 2012 Federal District of Mexico head of government election
- 2012 Chiapas gubernatorial election
- 2012 Guanajuato gubernatorial election
- 2012 Jalisco gubernatorial election
- 2012 Morelos gubernatorial election
- 2012 Tabasco gubernatorial election
- 2012 Yucatán gubernatorial election

== Awards ==
- Belisario Domínguez Medal of Honor – Ernesto de la Peña (post mortem)
- Order of the Aztec Eagle – Bono
- National Prize for Arts and Sciences
  - Linguistics and literature – Francisco Hernández Pérez
  - Physics, Mathematics, and Natural Sciences – Ruben Gerardo Barrera, Carlos Artemio Coello Coello, Susana Lizano
  - Technology and Design – Sergio Antonio Estrada Parra
  - Popular Arts and Traditions - Antonio Camilo Bautista Jariz, Cofradía de San Juan Bautista group, Traditional music community formed by the Vega-Utrera family
  - Fine arts – Arón Claudio Bitrán Goren, Helene Joy Laville Perren, Fernando González Gortázar
  - History, Social Sciences, and Philosophy – Carlos Marichal, Carlos Muñoz Izquierdo
- National Public Administration Prize
- Ohtli Award
  - Alexander Gonzalez
  - Charlie Gonzalez
  - Carlos Gutierrez
  - Salud Carbajal
  - Francisco G. Cigarroa
  - Paddy Moloney
  - Mel Martínez
  - David J. Schmidly
  - Richard A. Tapia
  - Alfredo Quiñones-Hinojosa
  - Edward James Olmos

== Film ==
- List of Mexican films of 2012

== Music ==
- List of number-one albums of 2012 (Mexico)

== Sport ==
=== Soccer/Football ===
- 2011–12 Mexican Primera División season
- Apertura 2012 Copa MX
- 2012 Copa de México de Naciones
- 2012 CONCACAF Champions League Finals
- 2012 Homeless World Cup
- Mexico wins the 2012 Olympic Football tournament

=== Racing ===
- 2012 LATAM Challenge Series season
- 2012 Rally México
- 2012 Super Copa Telcel

=== Wrestling ===
- Homenaje a Dos Leyendas (2012)
- Héroes Inmortales (2012)
- Rebelión de los Juniors (2012)
- Rey del Ring (2012)
- IWRG Ruleta de la Muerte (2012)
- Arena Naucalpan 35th Anniversary Show
- Caravan de Campeones (May 2012)
- Caravan de Campeones (August 2012)
- El Castillo del Terror (2012)
- Prison Fatal (2012)
- Legado Final (2012)
- Gran Cruzada (2012)
- Festival de las Máscaras (2012)
- CMLL Torneo Nacional de Parejas Increibles (2012)
- Guerra de Empresas (2012)
- Guerra del Golfo (2012)

=== Misc ===
- 2012 Vuelta a Mexico
- Men's Abierto Mexicano de Raquetas 2012
- 2012 NACAC Under-23 Championships in Athletics
- 2012 Women's Pan-American Volleyball Cup
- 2012 Boys' Youth NORCECA Volleyball Championship
- 2012 Girls' Youth NORCECA Volleyball Championship
- Mexico at the 2012 Summer Olympics
- Mexico at the 2012 Summer Paralympics
- Mexico at the 2012 Winter Youth Olympics

== Notable deaths ==
- January 7 – Raúl Régulo Quirino Garza, journalist (La Última Palabra) in Cadereyta, Nuevo León; killed.
- April 1 – Miguel de la Madrid, 52nd President of Mexico (PRI), 1982-1988 (born 1934)
- April 20
  - Mario Arturo Acosta Chaparro, military leader (born 1942)
  - Héctor Javier Salinas Aguirre, journalist (920 Radio Noticias), in Chihuahua, Chihuahua; killed.
  - Javier Moya Muñoz, journalist (920 Radio Noticias), in Chihuahua, Chihuahua; killed.
- April 28 – Regina Martínez Pérez, journalist (Proceso) in Xalapa, Veracruz; killed.
- May 3 – 2012 Veracruz murder of journalists:
  - Gabriel Huge Córdova, journalist (Notiver) in Boca del Río, Veracruz; killed.
  - Guillermo Luna Varela, journalist (Veracruznews).
  - Esteban Rodríguez, journalist (Diario AZ).
  - Ana Irasema Becerra Jiménez, journalist (El Dictamen).
- May 13 – René Orta Salgado, journalist (El Sol de Cuernavaca) and PRI politician, in Cuernavaca, Morelos; assassinated (b. ca. 1969).
- May 15 – Carlos Fuentes, Mexico-born author (La muerte de Artemio Cruz, Aura, Terra Nostra, Gringo Viejo), (born 1928)
- May 18 – Marco Antonio Ávila García, journalist (Sonora Diario Sonora de la Tarde & El Regional de Ciudad Obregón) in Empalme, Sonora; killed.
- June 14 – Víctor Manuel Báez Chinojournalist (Milenio Xalapa) in Xalapa, Veracruz; killed.
- June 30 – Armando Montaño, journalist (The Associated Press) in Mexico City; killed.
- August 5 – Chavela Vargas – Costa Rican singer who lived in Cuernavaca.
- August 12 – Edgar Morales Perez, mayor-elect of Matehuala, San Luis Potosi
- August 19 – Ernesto Araujo Cano, journalist (El Heraldo de Chihuahua) in Chihuahua, Chihuahua; killed.
- August 20 – 2012 Michoacán murder of photographers in Ecuandureo, Michoacán:
  - José Antonio Aguilar Mota, freelance photographer; killed.
  - Arturo Barajas López, photographer (Diario de Zamora); killed.
- September 25 – Alonso Lujambio, 50, Senator and former Secretary of Public Education; cancer
- October 7 – Heriberto Lazcano Lazcano, gang leader (Los Zetas); killed by the navy
- October 15 – Ramón Abel López Aguilar, journalist (Tijuana Informativo) in Tijuana, Baja California; killed.
- November 14 – Adrián Silva Moreno, freelance journalist in Tehuacán, Puebla; killed.
- November 15 – María Santos Gorrostieta Salazar, 36, politician PRD, former mayor of Tiquicheo, Michoacan; beaten to death (body found on this date).
- December 4 – Miguel Calero, soccer player (C.F. Pachuca)
- December 9 – Jenni Rivera, banda singer and coach of La Voz... México
- December 22 – David Araujo Arévalo, journalist (Novedades de Acapulco) in Acapulco, Guerrero; murdered.
