= Rubén Espinosa =

Mexican journalist and photographer (1983-2015)

- Born: Rubén Manuel Espinosa Becerril; November 29, 1983; Mexico City, Mexico
- Died: July 31, 2015 (aged 31); Mexico City, Mexico
- Cause of death: Murdered by gunfire
- Resting place: Panteón De Dolores, Mexico
- Occupation: Photojournalist
- Employer(s): AVC News agency, Proceso and Cuartoscuro magazines
- Known for: Social Movements

Rubén Manuel Espinosa Becerril (29 November 1983 – 31 July 2015) was a Mexican self-taught photographer and journalist. He worked for AVC News agency and Proceso and Cuartoscuro magazines. He covered daily news and social protests. He documented several protests where individuals were assaulted. Espinosa was killed in Narvarte, Mexico City, Mexico along with four women.

== Personal ==
Espinosa was born in Mexico City, Mexico.

== Career ==
For the majority of his career, Espinosa concentrated on social movements and protests. As a self-taught photographer and journalist, he began his career with Eclipse Photo in Mexico City, Mexico. While with Eclipse Photo, his primary job was photography. In 2009, he was hired by Javier Duarte during his campaign as governor. Espinosa also worked in Xalapa, Mexico for seven years. Xalapa is considered one of the most dangerous places to practice journalism. Espinosa's interest in social movements led him to find employment elsewhere. In Veracruz, Espinosa became a correspondent for Proceso and Cuartoscuro magazines. During his employment with the magazine, Espinosa voiced his opinion regarding the treatment of journalists in Mexico.

== Death ==
Before his death, Espinosa had received death threats. Espinosa began to receive threats towards him after the release of a photo of Duarte. During a social protest Espinosa was grabbed and told to quit taking photos or else he would end up like other dead journalists. Espinosa had also previously reported men standing outside his house and giving him intimidating glares and gestures. In June 2015, Espinosa decided to leave Veracruz and return to Mexico City. He reported experiencing symptoms of PTSD. Espinosa left his friends and even his dog Cosmos in Veracruz to find safety in Mexico City, which was a known refuge for journalists.

Espinosa was found dead on 31 July 2015 with four female victims. All five were found beaten and shot execution style. The victims also had various signs of torture on their bodies. The women who were found had all been sexually assaulted by the culprits. The names of the women were not released at the time until days later. The authorities believe that deaths occurred between 9 a.m. and 3 p.m. A final text message was placed by Espinosa at 2:13 p.m.

=== Investigation ===
Video surveillance caught three suspects walking out of the apartment. One of the suspects took the car of a victim and drove off with it. The car was later found abandoned on the outskirts of Mexico City. The case was viewed as a burglary due to the various objects taken from the residence. In August 2015, an unnamed serial rapist was arrested for the deaths of the victims. His fingerprints matched up to the evidence found in the apartment. There is still an ongoing investigation for the other two suspects caught on the surveillance video. The police department in charge of the investigation do have fifteen statements as well as evidence and photographs.

=== Context ===
Espinosa had reported threats being made towards him before his death. Espinosa had previously had several run ins with the law while covering several social movements. In 2012, Espinosa covered a student protest against Governor Javier Duarte during the anniversary of the revolution. During the protest Espinosa was grabbed and the man stated "Stop taking pictures if you don't want to end up like Regina". Regina Martinez Perez, was also a correspondent for Proceso and Cuartoscuro magazines. She had recently been killed after reporting on state official. Espinosa released a photograph of Governor Javier Duarte. The photograph showed Governor Duarte wearing a police cap and his stomach hanging over and below his belt. Espinosa received multiple threats after the release of the photograph. The governor was outraged by the photograph and article. He sent people to find and buy out all the prints released in various locations. Espinosa decided to flee Veracruz and find refugee in Mexico City, Mexico. His decision was made after seeing men standing outside of his house three separate times. He had reported that the men were giving him intimidating glances and gestures. On 31 July 2015 Espinosa was found alongside four other women. The women were identified as Nadia Vera, Yesenia Quiroz, Mile Virginia Martin, and Alejandra Negrete. His and the bodies of the women were all found killed execution style. Mile Virginia Marin was the last of the victims to be identified due to having a Colombian origin. Espinosa was the seventh journalist to killed in Mexico in 2015. Since 2011, under Javier Duarte's governorship of Veracruz, 15 journalist have been killed. Regina Martinez Pérez, Miguel Angel Lopez Velasco, Yolanda Ordaz de la Cruz, and the other journalist who have been murdered all have one similar thing. All their murders have had no responsible culprit punished. Regina Martinez Pérez worked alongside Espinosa in the past and was murdered on 28 April 2012. According to Reporters without Borders, In 2014 Mexico was the named the 6th country in the world with high rates of journalist being killed. After the death of Espinosa protesters gathered holding cameras and signs that stated "not one more" and "How many more Javier Duarte?". During his funeral journalists covered his grave with cameras. State and Legislative committees deal with the complaints made by reporters who has been attacked, harassed, or abused. However, nothing is ever resolved through the offices.

=== Impact ===
According to Article 19, Espinosa is the 88th journalist that has been killed in Mexico. Espinosa decided to flee to Mexico City in seek of refuge. Until his death Mexico City was seen as a refuge for journalists who were being threatened. Citizens have become angry and disheartened at the lack of safety and protection Governor Duarte has provided for journalists. As a self-taught journalist and photographer, Espinosa was motivated and felt strongly about journalist rights in Mexico. However, after reporting and photographing several brutal attacks and protests Espinosa began to be a target of threats. After his death Mexico City was no longer a place safe for journalist seeking refugee. Hundreds of journalist and photographers from around the world published a letter in PEN America asking for a clear notice of what occurred that day and who was responsible. They urged for a further investigation into his death.

=== Reactions ===
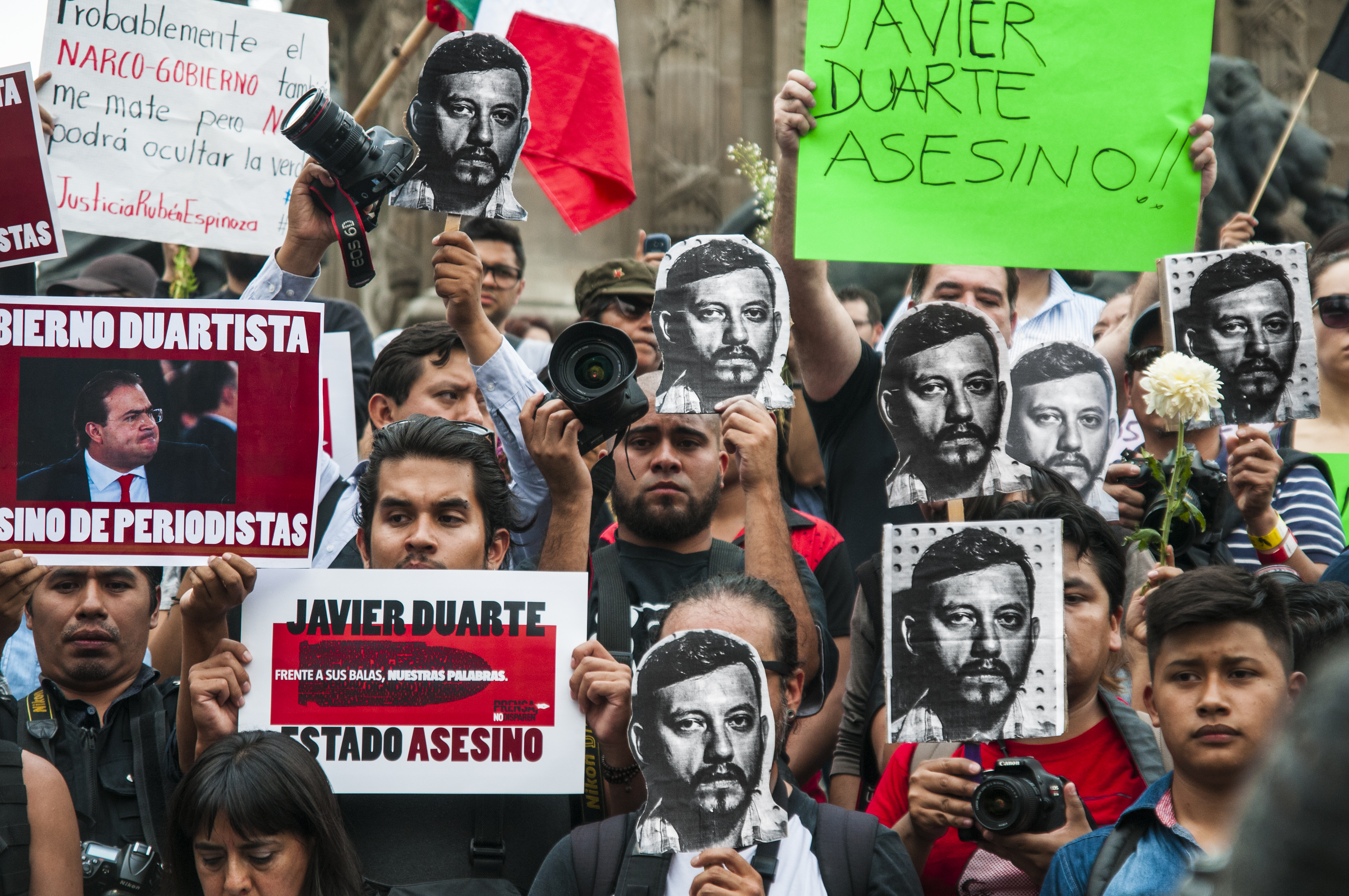
A march held after the death of Rubén Espinosa.

After the death of Espinosa, several protesters have gathered in several different locations in his honor. A colleague of his stated "He was both a photographer and activist...But most of all he was a great friend". The Office of the High Commissioner For Human Rights (OHCHR) stated after the death of Espinosa: "If the investigations confirm that this aberrant multiple homicide is related to Espinosa's work as a journalist, then we are in the presence of a grave act against freedom of expression".

== See also ==
- List of journalists and media workers killed in Mexico
- List of unsolved murders (2000–present)
- Mexican drug war
