= Rabindranath Salazar Solorio =

Mexican politician

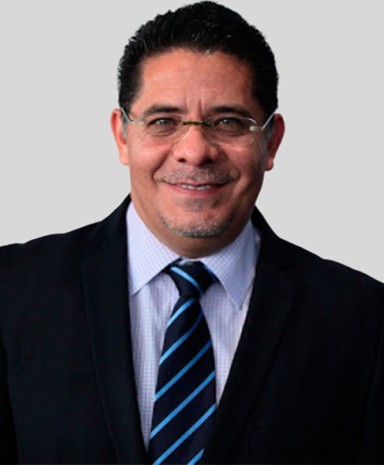
- Rabindranath Salazar Solorio
- Born: 2 June 1968 (age 58); Jiutepec, Morelos, Mexico
- Occupation: Politician
- Political party: Morena (since 2014)
- Other political affiliations: PRD (1997–2014)

Rabindranath Salazar Solorio (Note: In this Mexican name, the surname is Salazar and the second or maternal family name is Solorio.) (born 2 June 1968) is a Mexican politician from the state of Morelos. Previously affiliated with the Party of the Democratic Revolution (PRD), he aligned himself with the National Regeneration Movement (Morena) in 2014.

Salazar Solorio was born in Jiutepec, Morelos, in 1968. He has a degree in accountancy from the Autonomous University of Morelos (UAEM).

In 2006 he was elected to a three-year term as municipal president of Jiutepec and, from 2009 to 2012, he sat in the Congress of Morelos. In 2012, he unsuccessfully sought the PRD's nomination for the Morelos gubernatorial election of 1 July 2012.

In the 2012 general election he was elected to the Senate for Morelos on the PRD ticket. In October 2014, he resigned his membership in the party and joined the National Regeneration Movement.

He again unsuccessfully sought his party's nomination to contend the 2018 gubernatorial election but placed behind Cuauhtémoc Blanco in the pre-election surveys.

In June 2020, President Andrés Manuel López Obrador appointed him to serve as the undersecretary for democratic development, social participation and religious affairs at the Secretariat of the Interior.
