= Víctor Manuel Báez =

Mexican crime journalist and murder victim

- Víctor Manuel Báez Chino
- Born: Mexico
- Disappeared: 13 June 2012; Xalapa, Veracruz, Mexico
- Died: 14 June 2012; Xalapa, Veracruz, Mexico
- Cause of death: Murdered by the Zetas drug cartel
- Body discovered: 14 June 2012
- Occupations: Journalist and editor
- Employer: Milenio (Xalapa) newspaper
- Known for: Crime reporting in Veracruz, Mexico
- Website: milenio.com reporterospoliciacos.mx

Víctor Manuel Báez Chino (died 14 June 2012) was a Mexican crime journalist and editor for the digital edition of the Milenio newspaper in Xalapa and an editor for the crime-oriented website Reporteros Policiacos. Báez was abducted 13 June 2012 and found murdered the next day in the main city square of Xalapa, Veracruz, Mexico.

While he was the fifth journalist killed in the state of Veracruz in a two-month period in 2012, he was the ninth journalists killed in Veracruz since March 2011 as a result of the Mexican drug war. At the time of his murder, six journalists had been killed in Mexico in 2012.

== Career ==
Báez was the editor of the crime section for the state digital edition of the national newspaper Milenio and an editor of the website Reporteros Policiacos.

He was a colleague of Regina Martínez Pérez, a Proceso crime reporter who was also killed in 2012.

== Death ==
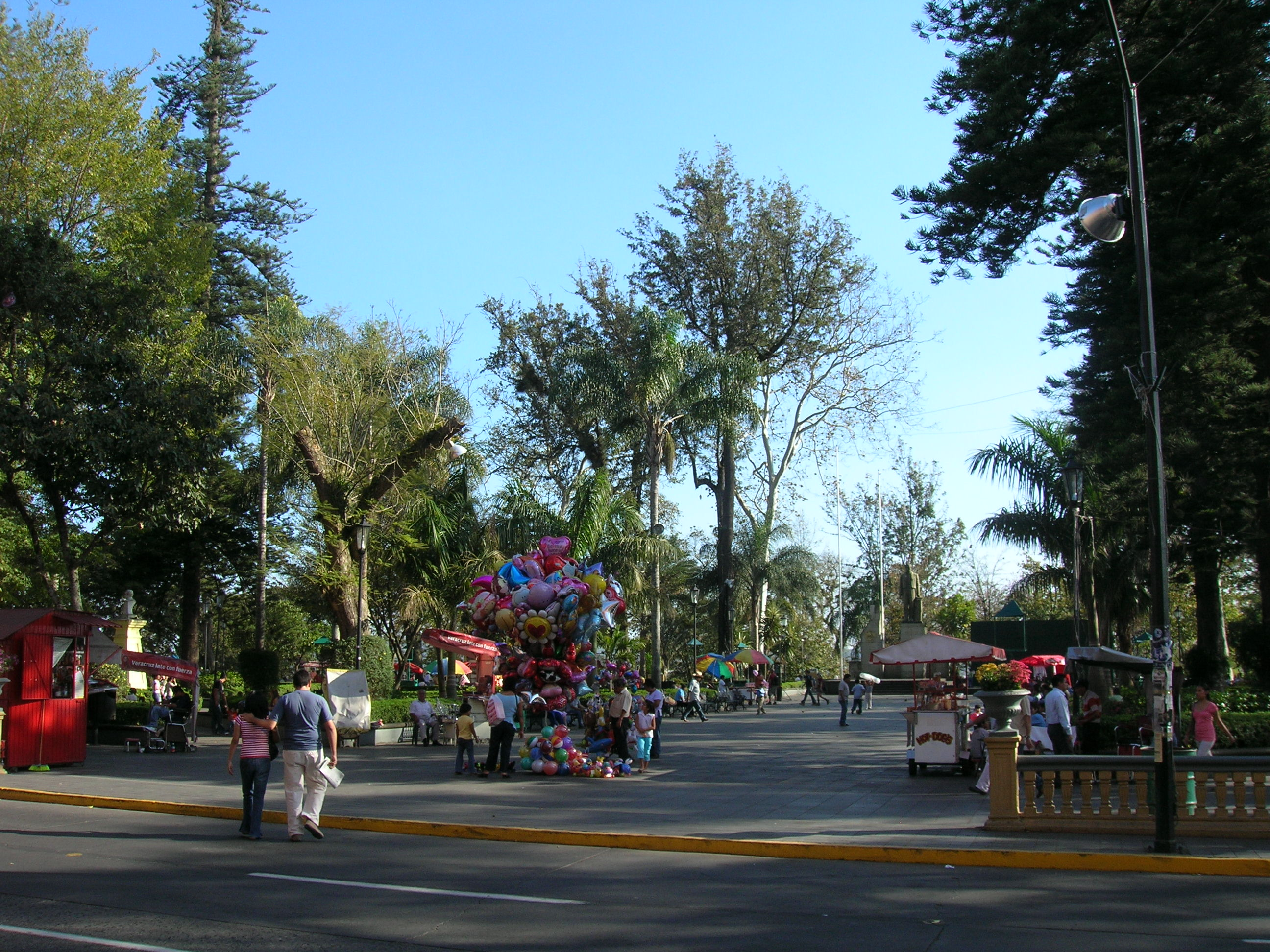
Báez's corpse was found on a street named after Úrsulo Galván and near Parque Juárez (pictured), Xalapa, which was close to his office.

Mentioned locations within Mexico relative to the capital Mexico City.

Víctor Manuel Báez was kidnapped by three armed men in a gray van outside of the offices of Reporteros Policiacos at around 11 p.m. when he was leaving work 13 June 2012. Báez was found murdered the next day. His body had been dumped on a street by Parque Juárez in the center of Xalapa, which is the capital of the state of Veracruz.

Los Zetas drug cartel took responsibility for his murder in a note was left by his body, which read, "This is what happens to traitors and those who act smart. Sincerely, the Zetas."

== Context ==
The violence against journalists in Veracruz has been exacerbated by the struggle between the Los Zetas and the Sinaloa cartels, state intervention and the declaration of a Mexican drug war, as well as corruption. Journalists have been visible targets of all of these forces. Journalists killed in Veracruz since March 2011 include Noel López Olguín (killed 8 March 2011 in Chinameca, Veracruz) was a crime reporter for La Verdad in Jáltipan; Miguel Ángel López Velasco, a crime columnist, and his son Miseal López Solana, a photojournalist, who both worked for Notiver (killed 20 June 2011 in Veracruz, Veracruz); Yolanda Ordaz de la Cruz (killed 26 July 2011) was a fellow crime reporter who worked for López and with his son at Notiver and she was abducted 3 days earlier from Veracruz and found decapitated in Boca del Río; Regina Martínez Pérez was a journalist for the investigative news magazine Proceso (killed 28 April 2012 in Xalapa); and the murder of Guillermo Luna Varela, Gabriel Huge Córdoba of Notiver, and Esteban Rodríguez Rodríguez, as well as newspaper publicist Ana Irasema Becerra Jiménez (brutally killed 3 May 2012, stuffed into bags and dumped in a canal in Boca del Río).

== Impact ==
The investigation was declared closed by the state, although press rights organizations and critics have rejected the investigators' reasoning.

After the Mexican navy captured drug cartel member Juan Carlos Hernández Pulido, it announced that evidence found at his arrest linked him to the murder of Ana Irasema Becerra Jiménez in Veracruz and three murdered journalists Investigators then announced they had found a link between this crime and Báez's case as witnesses of Báez's murder were able to identify two men killed at a related shootout. A spokesperson for Committee to Protect Journalists said he doubted the link between the two cases, the interrogation techniques used, and whether the investigators had evidence that could lead to a prosecution at the federal level. A spokesperson for Article 19 said, "The government of Veracruz is trying to shelve its worst-ever crisis of violence against the press."

== Reactions ==
Irina Bokova, director-general of UNESCO said, "I am deeply concerned about the murder of Víctor Manuel Báez Chino, and call on the authorities to ensure that this crime against freedom of expression, a fundamental human right, does not go unpunished. All too many brave Mexican journalists have been paying with their lives for society’s right to be kept informed. The impunity enjoyed by their murderers must be brought to an end."

A Committee to Protect Journalists spokesperson, said, "Perhaps the most devastating effect of this unprecedented wave of violence is the fact that people in Veracruz are being deprived of vital information of one of the issues that is obviously having a very serious effect in the lives of the people, which is the level of violence, the number of killings."

== See also ==
- Mexican drug war
- List of journalists killed in Mexico
