= Fernando Guzmán =

Fernando Guzmán may refer to:

- Fernando Guzmán Mata (1921–1993), Costa Rican physician and politician
- Fernando Guzmán Moreno (1871–1933), Chilean lawyer and politician
- Fernando Guzmán Pérez (born 1956), Mexican politician
- Fernando Guzmán Solórzano (1812–1891), Nicaraguan politician, president in 1867–1871
