= 2012 Jalisco gubernatorial election =

The 2012 gubernatorial election in the Mexican state of Jalisco was held on Sunday, July 1, 2012. Incumbent Jalisco Governor Emilio González Márquez of the National Action Party (PAN) is retiring due to mandatory term limits, which limit all Mexican state governors to one, six-year term in office. The Jalisco gubernatorial election coincided with the 2012 Mexican presidential and general elections.

== Candidates ==
Party/Coalition	Candidates	Votes	
National Action Party	Fernando Guzmán Pérez	655,289	19.89%
Institutional Revolutionary Party; Ecologist Green Party of Mexico	Aristóteles Sandoval	1,279,172	38.83%
Party of the Democratic Revolution	Fernando Garza Martínez	112,719	3.42%
Citizens' Movement	Enrique Alfaro Ramírez	1,121,977	34.06%
New Alliance Party	María de los Ángeles Martínez Valdivia	45,400	1.37%
Source: https://web.archive.org/web/20120709033418/http://www.eluniversal.com.mx/elecciones2012/Jalisco/

== Polling ==
A poll conducted by El Universal in May 2012 showed PRI candidate Jorge Aristóteles Sandoval leading his three opponents in the race.
