= 2014 Copa de México de Naciones =

The 2014 Copa de México de Naciones is the 3rd edition of the Copa México de Naciones Sub-16 and it took place in the city of Mexico from August 2 to August 10, organized by the FEF (Federacion Mexicana de Futbol Asociacion AC). The previous two cups (2012 Copa de México de Naciones, 2013 Copa de México de Naciones) were both Sub-15.

For this edition all players must be born on January 1, 1998, or after.

== Participating teams ==
Sixteen participants were invited from AFC, CONCACAF, CONMBOL and UEFA (two from Mexico).

- Bermuda
- Brazil
- Canada
- Colombia
- Costa Rica
- Chile
- China
- Ecuador
- Honduras
- South Korea
- Mexico (2 teams)
- Paraguay
- Portugal
- Scotland
- United States

Originally, Argentina was slated to participate, but because of the death of Julio Grondona, head of the Asociacion del Futbol Argentino, they were forced to cancel their involvement

== Group stage ==
=== Group A ===
- Ecuador 9pts
- Mexico 6pts
- Honduras 3pts
- Scotland 0pts

=== Group B ===
- United States 9pts
- Paraguay 4pts
- Mexico#2 3pts
- China 1pt

=== Group C ===
- Brazil 9pts
- South Korea 6pts
- Costa Rica 3pts
- Canada 0pts

=== Group D ===
- Portugal 9pts
- Colombia 6pts
- Chile 3pts
- Bermuda 0pts

== Semi finals ==
- Ecuador 2 vs 1 United States
- Paraguay 5 vs 4 Brazil

== Finals ==
- Ecuador vs Paraguay, Estadio Azteca, August 10, 2014.
