= Solorio =

Solorio is a surname. Notable people with the surname include:

- Christian Solorio, American politician
- Jose Solorio (born 1970), American politician
- Luis Solorio (born 1994), Mexican footballer
- Rabindranath Salazar Solorio (born 1968), Mexican politician
