= Humberto Millán Salazar =

Mexican journalist and murder victim

- Born: 6 February 1958; Birth place unknown
- Died: 24 August 2011 (aged 53); Campo Morelia, Sinaloa, Mexico
- Education: Facultad de Derecho, Class of 1978
- Occupation: Journalist
- Years active: 1978 – August 23, 2011

Humberto Millán Salazar (6 February 1958 – 24 August 2011), a Mexican journalist, was a radio host of "Sin Ambages" (Translated: Plain Language) on Radio Fórmula and the founder, editor, and columnist for the online newspaper A Discusión in Culiacan, Mexico. Salazar was abducted on 24 August 2011. His body was discovered by authorities the next day.

At the time of his abduction, 13 Mexican journalists had disappeared since 2003. He was the second journalist to be killed in Mexico within a month, the sixth Mexican journalist to have been killed in 2011 at the time of his death, and one of over 70 journalists killed in Mexico since 2000. Local journalists and the director-general of UNESCO said the case illustrated how impunity for the murders of Mexican journalists put working journalists in the country in danger and harmed its citizens access to information.

== Death ==
Humberto Millán Salazar was on his way to Radio Fórmula to broadcast his program "Sin Ambages" at approximately 5:56 a.m., Wednesday, 24 August 2011. As he neared the radio station, two SUVs pulled into his path. Four or five men armed with handguns exited the vehicles and ordered Millán into the back of one of the trucks. It is estimated that the exchange took no more than 10 seconds, which authorities said suggested prolonged and meticulous planning. Millán was abducted with his brother, who was developmentally disabled and later released at Millán's request. Authorities discovered Millán's body the very next day at Campo Morelia, a field about 10 km north of Culiacan. He had suffered a gunshot wound to the head.

Fellow journalist and friend Osuna Encino said he believed Millán's death was related to his political reporting in which he compared the administration to the previous government and that Millán had complained against the intimidation of the press.

Just before his death, Millán had printed a sensitive political story about the debt ceiling.

On 2 September, Millán's family gave officials a CD. The CD was left in a safe by Millán with instructions to publicize if something had happened to him. Details of the disc are still unrevealed.

== Context ==
Mexico is the 4th most dangerous country for journalists. It is suspected that Millán's murder is connected to his political opponents. However, the prevalent drug cartel could also be responsible for his death. Crime organizations account for 76 percent of suspected murders while government officials account for 4 percent. Mexico is considered by the CIA to be a major drug producing nation, generating 15,800 metric tons of marijuana and 68 metric tons of heroin per year. In Sinaloa—the state in Mexico where Millán was murdered—operates one of the largest, most dangerous drug cartels: The Sinaloa Cartel. It is suspected, however, that Millán was not kidnapped by this group. Instead, it has been speculated that—due to his critical writing and analysis of local authorities, government, and political infighting—Millán's death may be connected to his political opponents.

== Impact ==
Mexico is considered one of the most dangerous countries for media in the western hemisphere. Millán is one of nearly 80 journalists murdered in Mexico since 2000. His murder occurred just one month after the decapitation of crime reporter Yolanda Ordaz de la Cruz, of Notiver in Veracruz. The motive and of Millán's murder is still under investigation, but friends and colleagues suggest that his political opponents are responsible for his death. Millán, just a day before his abduction, helped to uncover and publicize a political secret within the Institutional Revolutionary Party (PRI). Millán printed that the debt ceiling of the state of Sinaloa increased from $200 million, to $35 billion within a matter of months. In his article, Millán accused Humberto Moreira Valdés, president of PRI, of intentionally increasing the debt, profiting on the increase, and attempting to cover it up. The next day, Millán was kidnapped and killed. Of all the journalists missing or dead in Mexico in the past decade, none of the perpetrators of these crimes have been arrested or stood trial.

== Reactions ==
Irina Bokova, who is the director-general of UNESCO, condemned the murder of Millán on 30 August 2011. Bokova said, "It is essential that the impunity enjoyed by those responsible for such crimes in Mexico be brought to an end, for the sake of the basic human right of freedom of expression, freedom of the press, good governance and rule of law."

Reporters Without Borders also condemned the murder of Millán. They urged authorities to not rule out the possibility that he was murdered in connection with his work.

The Mexican journalist group Asociación de Periodistas 7 de Junio immediately protested outside the state capital of Culiacan and demanded the state do something about attacks on journalists. After two months the same organization was frustrated by the impunity in Millán's case and compared it with another murder of two female journalists that occurred one week after his murder—the murder robbery of Ana María Yarce Viveros, founder of Contralínea magazine, and Rocio González Trápaga, freelance journalist—in which authorities successfully arrested two suspects and searched for another.

== Career ==
In 1996 Millán founded the online newspaper A Discusión. He also hosted a daily radio broadcast entitled "Sin Ambages" on Radio Fórmula. He also broadcast on Radio UAS, which is a station operated by the Autonomous University of Sinaloa. Millán has also worked for many local newspapers including El Debate and El Sol de Sinaloa.

== Personal ==
Humberto attended high school at Escuela Técnica Agropecuaria. After graduating, he went on to attend college at Facultad de Derecho. Millán is survived by his wife and daughter.

== See also ==
- Mexican drug war
- List of journalists killed in Mexico
