= 2012 Chiapas gubernatorial election =

The 2012 gubernatorial election in the Mexican state of Chiapas was held on Sunday, July 1, 2012. Incumbent Chiapas Governor Juan Sabines Guerrero of the Party of the Democratic Revolution (PRD) is retiring due to mandatory term limits, which limit all Mexican state governors to one, six-year term. The Chiapas gubernatorial election coincided with the 2012 Mexican presidential and general elections.

== Candidates ==
Party/Coalition	Candidates	Votes	
National Action Party (PAN)	Emmanuel Nivón González	150,534	9.07%
Institutional Revolutionary Party; Ecologist Green Party of Mexico; New Alliance Party	Manuel Velasco Coello	1,114,187	67.17%
Partido de la Revolución Democrática; Labor Party; Citizens' Movement	María Elena Orantes López	291,367	17.5%
Partido Orgullo Chiapas	Marcela Bonilla Grajales	21,543	1.3%
