= Commitment to Mexico =

Commitment to Mexico Compromiso por México
- Presidential Candidate: Enrique Peña Nieto
- Founded: 2011
- Dissolved: 2015
- Succeeded by: Todos por México
- Ideology: Third Way; Liberalism; Constitutionalism; Social corporatism Green politics
- Political position: Centre
- Seats in the Chamber of Deputies: 241 / 500
- Seats in the Senate of the Republic: 61 / 128

Commitment to Mexico (Spanish: Compromiso por México) was an electoral alliance between the Institutional Revolutionary Party and the Green Ecologist Party for the 2012 Mexican general election. The alliance supported Enrique Peña Nieto in his successful campaign for the 2012 Mexican general election.

Likewise, the alliance was replicated in the candidacies for senators by some states and federal deputies in various electoral districts throughout the country.

Although the New Alliance Party was originally part of the coalition, on 20 January 2012, its leadership decided (the political institute) to compete separately.

== Presidential elections ==
Election year	Candidate	Votes	%	Outcome	Notes
2012	Enrique Peña Nieto	19,158,592	39.17	✓ Elected	
