= Gabriel Quadri de la Torre =

Mexican politician

Gabriel Quadri
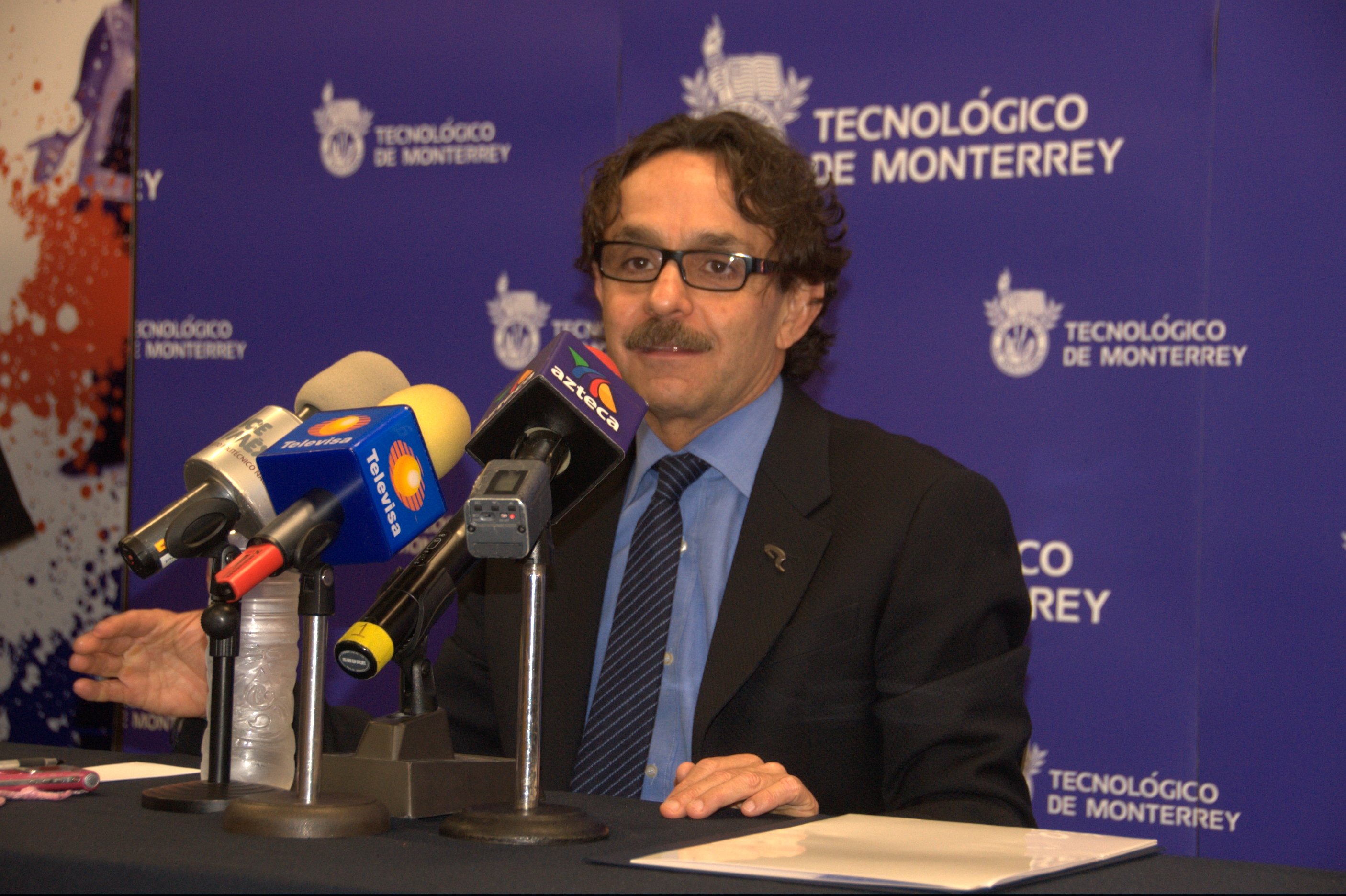
- Gabriel Quadri at ITESM prior to 2012 Mexican elections

Member of the Chamber of Deputies for Mexico City's 23rd district
- In office 1 September 2021 – 31 August 2024

Personal details
- Born: Gabriel Ricardo Quadri de la Torre; 4 August 1954 (age 71) Mexico City, Mexico
- Party: National Action Party
- Other political affiliations: New Alliance Party (2012)
- Education: Ibero-American University, University of Texas at Austin
- Profession: Politician, economist, engineer

Gabriel Ricardo Quadri de la Torre (born 4 August 1954), better known as Gabriel Quadri de la Torre or simply as Gabriel Quadri, is a Mexican politician and former presidential candidate for the New Alliance Party (Spanish: Partido Nueva Alianza, PANAL), despite not being affiliated with the party. He was the presidential candidate for his party in the 2012 general election. Between 2021 and 2024, he served in the Chamber of Deputies, representing Mexico City's 23rd federal electoral district (Coyoacán) for the right-wing party in Mexico, the National Action Party (PAN). Due to the district being abolished by the National Electoral Institute during its 2022 redistricting process, he instead ran for reelection in 2024 in Mexico City's 8th federal electoral district under the Fuerza y Corazón por México coalition. He was ultimately defeated by Ana María Lomelí, the candidate for the Sigamos Haciendo Historia coalition.

== Education ==
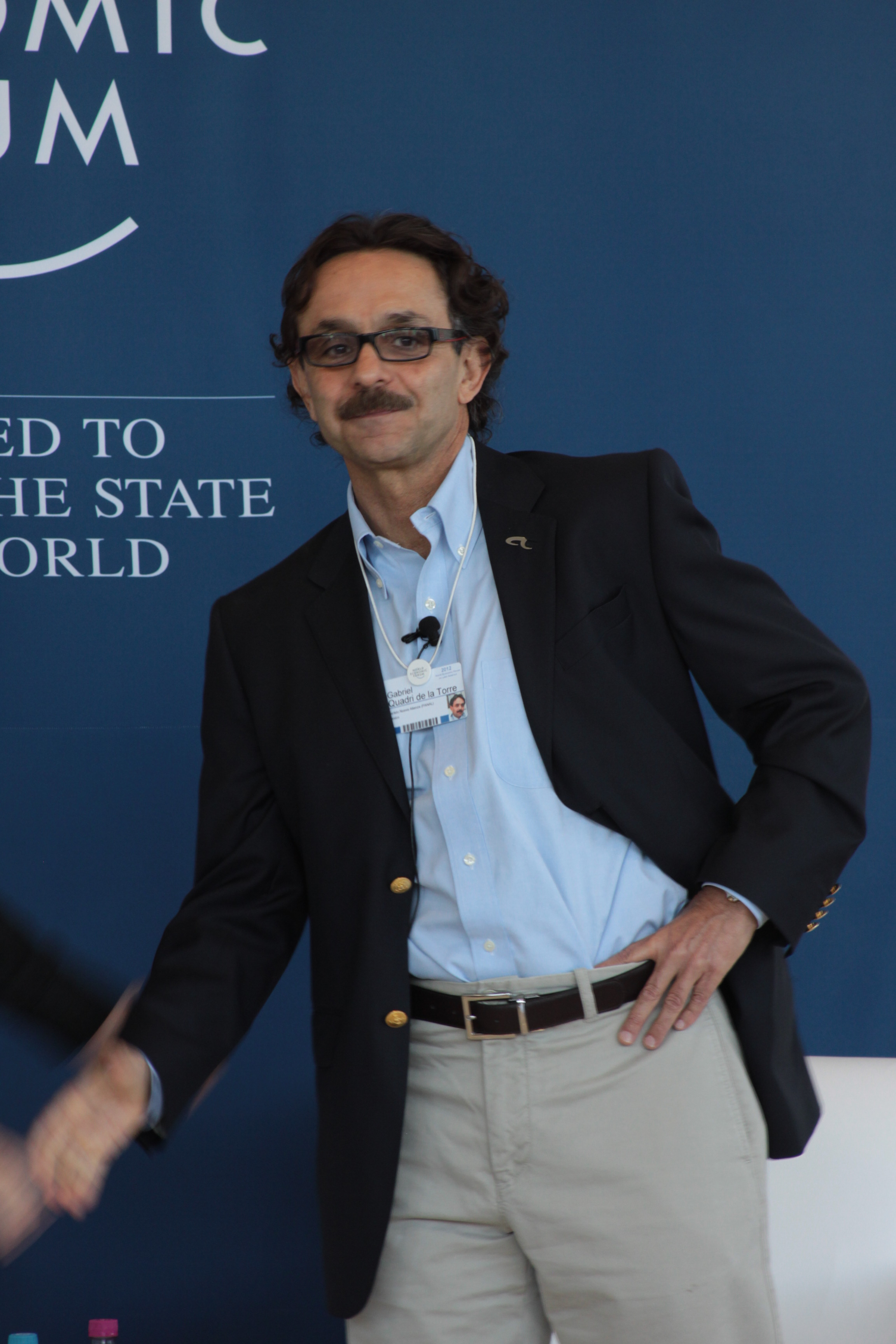
Quadri at the World Economic Forum in 2012

Quadri graduated from the Ibero-American University with a major in Civil engineering. He undertook graduate studies at the University of Texas and was awarded a Master of Arts degree in Economics in 1981. He was awarded the Walter Reuter Prize in 2010 for his several publications on climate change and the environment. In addition, Quadri has written several books on preserving the environment and has been a collaborator in the media.

== Political career ==
He began as an advisor of the National Institute of Ecology during the presidency of Ernesto Zedillo (1994–2000), working under Julia Carabias, who was head of the Secretariat of the Environment and Natural Resources. He then became the general director of the Centro de Estudios Económicos; Quadri was also the chief of the External Financing sector in the Bank of Mexico. Quadri was also the founder of SIGEA, an organization dedicated to environmentalism.

== 2012 presidential campaign ==
On 16 February 2012, the New Alliance Party (PANAL) registered Gabriel Quadri as its presidential candidate for the 2012 general election. He was the first candidate of all presidential candidates to register for the election at the Federal Electoral Institute. The New Alliance Party broke its coalition with the Institutional Revolutionary Party (PRI) and the Ecologist Green Party of Mexico (PVEM), and Quadri accepted to become a candidate for the presidency. Ernesto Cordero Arroyo, one of the three final candidates for the National Action Party (PAN), said in January 2012 that a coalition with the New Alliance Party could be beneficial and that "in politics, one has to be open to every possibility". Josefina Vázquez Mota, the National Action Party's presidential candidate for the 2012 election, said that her party would not form a coalition with the New Alliance Party.

== Constituent Assembly of Mexico City ==
Quadri was one of two New Alliance representatives elected by the voters of Mexico City to sit on the Constituent Assembly of Mexico City, which convened on 15 September 2016.

== Proposals and political views ==
Quadri de la Torre said he represents the candidate of those "unsatisfied" with Mexican politics and partisanship. La Jornada said that Quadri believes mediocracy is a result of Mexico's particracy and called the country's citizens to remember that they "are not condemned to vote for the same politicians and political parties" and that "alternatives exist". Quadri claimed in March 2012 that he was the "only candidate of the citizens" because he claimed not to receive any orders, not even from his political party and Elba Esther Gordillo.

During the presidential election, he presented his "13 points for a competitive and sustainable Mexico".

=== Drug policies ===
Quadri proposed that the issue of drug legalization should be analyzed thoroughly and also consider the decriminalization of narcotics. He said that decriminalization should account for the consumption, production, and distribution of all kinds of drugs. Mónica Gordillo, a politician from the New Alliance Party, said that the solutions to the Mexican drug war are not only "armed confrontations" and that the consideration of the legalization and decriminalization of drugs should be carried out; moreover, the New Alliance Party holds that the drug policies are a matter of "public health".

=== Police forces reconstruction ===
Quadri argues that the municipal police forces in Mexico are "corrupt" and have often aided the drug cartels and that it is necessary to abolish their existence and replace it with a "world-class Federal police corporation." He mentioned, however, that this reform is a "very long process" but that the work should be done notwithstanding how much it will take to create one. "The municipal police forces," Quadri said, "have over 2,500 corrupt officers around Mexico, who are poorly paid, unprepared, and penetrated by the organized crime groups." The ideal police force that Quadri has in mind should have "more than 350,000 officers that are qualified and well paid" to reach the standard of the police forces in Colombia and Chile.

Quadri believes that the Mexican Armed Forces should continue the fight against the drug cartels and "should not march back" because Mexico does not yet have an adequate police force to combat the cartels.

=== Pemex privatization ===
Quadri wants to reform Pemex, Mexico's state-owned petroleum company, privatizing 49% of the company and leaving the remaining 51% to the government. Quadri believes that this reform will allow Pemex to "compete with multinational companies" and eventually construct "petroleum bases in other countries" and "give dividends." He wants Pemex to be similar to Petrobras, Brazil's semi-public energy corporation.

=== Same-sex marriages ===
Quadri supports and advocates the legalization of same-sex marriage.

=== Views on transgender topics ===
His views on transgender topics had him expelled from a live debate on CNN Español in January 2022, where he was accused of transphobia.

=== Abortion and secular state ===
On 20 April 2012, Quadri claimed that he was not in favor of abortion but was opposed to criminalizing women for making decisions regarding their bodies. Instead, Quadri proposes prevention measures such as sexual education, contraception, and family planning strategies. In addition, he supports the idea of maintaining Mexico as a secular state.
