= Juan Ignacio Torres Landa =

Mexican politician

Federal deputy for Guanajuato's 9th district
- In office 1991–1994

Local deputy in the Congress of Guanajuato
- In office 1988–1991

Municipal president of San José Iturbide
- In office 1983–1985

Personal details
- Born: Juan Ignacio Torres Landa García; 5 July 1959; León, Guanajuato, Mexico
- Died: 7 June 2013 (aged 53); San Luis Potosí, San Luis Potosí, Mexico
- Cause of death: Aviation accident
- Political party: PRI
- Spouse: Maricela Aranda Torres
- Children: Five
- Parent(s): Juan José Torres Landa, María Teresa García Sardaneta

Juan Ignacio Torres Landa García (Note: In this Spanish name, the first or paternal surname is Torres Landa and the second or maternal family name is García.) (5 July 1959 – 7 June 2013) was a Mexican politician from the Institutional Revolutionary Party (PRI). He represented his party in Congress and ran twice for governor of Guanajuato. He was killed in an aviation accident in the state of San Luis Potosí.

== Early life ==
Juan Ignacio Torres Landa was born in León, Guanajuato, on 5 July 1959, to Juan José Torres Landa, who served as governor of Guanajuato for the PRI in 1961–1967, and María Teresa García Sardaneta.

== Political career ==
Torres Landa joined the youth branch of the PRI in 1975. He served as the municipal president of San José Iturbide, Guanajuato, from 1983 to 1985 and in the Congress of Guanajuato from 1988 to 1991. In the 1991 mid-terms, he was elected to the Chamber of Deputies to represent Guanajuato's 9th district (San Miguel Allende) during the 55th Congress. During his term, he served as president of the Chamber of Deputies (1992).

He was the PRI's candidate for governor of Guanajuato on two occasions: in the 2 July 2000 election he lost to Juan Carlos Romero Hicks of the National Action Party (PAN), and in the 1 July 2012 election he lost to the PAN's Miguel Márquez Márquez.

== Death ==
Torres Landa died on 7 June 2013 when the Jet Ranger helicopter he was travelling on plummeted into a golf course in the city of San Luis Potosí shortly after take-off. He was 53 years old. A brother of former governor of Querétaro Mariano Palacios Alcocer was also killed in the crash.

== Personal life ==
Torres Landa was married to Maricela Aranda Torres, with whom he had five children.
