= 2012 Morelos gubernatorial election =

The 2012 gubernatorial election in the Mexican state of Morelos was held on Sunday, July 1, 2012. Incumbent Morelos Governor Marco Antonio Adame of the National Action Party (PAN) is retiring due to mandatory term limits, which limit all Mexican state governors to one, six-year term in office. The Morelos gubernatorial election coincided with the 2012 Mexican presidential and general elections.

== Candidates ==
Party/Coalition	Candidates	Votes	
National Action Party	Adrián Rivera Pérez	113,994	15.1%
Institutional Revolutionary Party; Ecologist Green Party of Mexico; New Alliance Party	José Amado Orihuela Trejo	261,822	34.7%
Party of the Democratic Revolution; Labor Party; Citizens' Movement	Graco Ramírez	326,423	43.3
Social Democratic Party of Morelos	Julio Cesar Yañez Moreno	31,239	4.1%
