= 2012 Boca del Río murder of journalists =

Massacre in Veracruz, Mexico

2012 Veracruz murder of journalists
- Part of Mexican drug war
- Location: 19°06′20″N 96°06′28″W; Boca Del Río, Veracruz, Mexico
- Date: 3 May 2012
- Attack type: Murder
- Deaths: 4
- Victims: Guillermo Luna Varela, Gabriel Huge Córdoba, Esteban Rodríguez Rodríguez, Ana Irasema Becerra Jiménez

The 2012 Veracruz murder of journalists is about the disappearance, murder and dismemberment of three journalists and a woman who worked in public relations whose bodies were discovered in Boca del Río, Veracruz, Mexico. Their bodies were recovered from a canal on World Press Freedom Day, or 3 May 2012, and showed signs of torture and mutilation, which prompted calls for investigations into links with organized crime. The gruesome murder followed other murders of members of the press in the Veracruz area and during the Mexican drug war, and highlighted the danger for working journalists.

== Background ==
El Programa de Agravios a Periodistas y Defensores Civiles reported 580 incidents affecting the media from 2005 to May 2012, including 79 homicides, 14 missing journalists, and 26 recorded threats. The number of reported incidents in Mexico has steadily increased over past years, reaching number eight in the Committee to Protect Journalists'(CPJ) impunity index. Veracruz is well known for the Sinaloa and Zetas drug cartels. These two cartels fight for control of Boca del Río, Veracruz, making it one of the most dangerous Mexican states for the press. In a year and a half, six journalists were reported dead from this area. The murders of Luna, Huge, Rodríguez, and Becerra brought the total to ten reported deaths.

== Incident ==
Guillermo Luna Varela worked for Notiver in Veracruz, Veracruz and was colleagues with two other murdered journalists, Miguel Ángel López Velasco and Yolanda Ordaz de la Cruz.

On World Press Freedom Day, the bodies of Guillermo Luna Varela, Gabriel Huge Córdova, and Esteban Rodríguez, three photojournalists, were recovered from La Zamorana canal in Boca del Río. After not returning from covering a road incident, the families of Guillermo Luna and Gabriel Huge reported them missing. Police found the dismembered bodies of Luna and Huge in a black plastic bag. They also recovered the bodies of Rodríguez and Irasema Becerra. Becerra and Luna were in a relationship, and she worked for a local newspaper firm.

== Journalists involved ==
=== Guillermo Luna Varela ===
Luna was a photographer who worked for Notiver and covered police-related stories. Six months prior to his death, he worked for the website Veracruznews, Voz del Sureste, and El Díario de Cardel. His police beat was in Xalapa and Boca del Río in Veracruz. His body was found in Boca del Río alongside his uncle, Huge, and also showed signs of torture. Luna was reported missing a day earlier by his family after not returning from covering a road accident.

=== Gabriel Huge Córdoba ===
Huge's body displayed signs of torture and was found in a black bag with Luna, his nephew. He worked at Notiver as a photographer and he also worked for a radio station in Poza Rica. After three journalists of The Notiver were murdered the previous year, Huge fled from the city. When he returned, he worked as a freelancer. He disappeared on a Wednesday with Luna while covering a traffic incident.

=== Esteban Rodríguez Rodríguez ===
Rodríguez was a retired photojournalist and reporter who worked for the Diario AZ. He became a welder after his retirement. After the murder of fellow journalists at The Notiver, Rodríguez temporarily fled the state and retired, returning to Veracruz to work as a welder.

=== Ana Irasema Becerra Jiménez ===
A fourth body was later identified as Becerra, Luna's companion. While she was not a journalist, she worked for a local paper in public relations.

== Investigation ==
On Monday, 13 August, the Mexican Navy began to crack the case. "The Mexican Navy announced Monday that a man suspected of being a member of a drug gang had been captured while carrying the identification cards of a recently slain newspaper employee in the state of Veracruz. The authorities link the suspect, Juan Carlos Hernández Pulido, whom they captured Friday, to the killing of the newspaper employee, Irasema Becerra. Her dismembered remains were found in May along with those of three photojournalists."

Authorities searched the vehicle of Hernández, also known as "Bertha", when a suspicious individual was reported in a parking lot. In his vehicle, they found more than 150 bags of cocaine and marijuana, which he sold alongside illegal firearms. They also found documents and an ID belonging to Becerra, linking him to the Boca Del Rio homicide. He is accused of working for the Jalisco drug cartel as a hired murderer. Hernández was not working alone.

Veracruz authorities closed the case 15 August and claimed members of a drug gang confessed to the murders. Some uncertainty about the finality of the case was presented. "But as soon as the arrests were announced on Wednesday, questions began to surface, beginning with the most obvious one. Why would the seven suspects, picked up on drug and weapons charges, spontaneously admit to far more serious crimes, in this case four brutal killings?" Nine journalists in the last 18 months have focused attention on the investigations in Veracruz.

Further investigation, along with coincidence, linked several other cases of homicide among journalists and their families. These linked cases are not linked to the Veracruz murder by perpetrator, but by similarities in the brutality of the homicides. The following are related homicide cases:

- Regina Martínez Pérez, journalist found strangled in her home in Xalapa, Veracruz on 28 April, Saturday. She was considered a muckraker on drug cartels and worked as a correspondent for the magazine Proceso.
- Yolanda Ordaz de la Cruz, partner reporter to Córdova, found decapitated after her abduction by armed men outside her house. A note was found on her body, further linking her to Miguel Ángel López Velasco.
- Miguel Ángel López Velasco, a columnist, was murdered alongside his wife and son, a photographer, and found on 20 June. A traffic cop, Juan Carlos Carranza Saavedra, was a suspect in their deaths.

== Impact ==
The murders of Luna, Huge, Rodríguez and Becerra heightened awareness of the dangers for journalists in the Veracruz area. Officials and organizations recognize the need to combat the violence of growing drug cartels. Efforts are made to further increase awareness, especially with outrage from UNESCO, Article 19, and other groups focused on the rights and safety of journalists.

== Reactions ==
Irina Bokova, director-general of UNESCO, expressed her concerned about the deaths of journalists in the Veracruz area. "News of the murders of Gabriel Huge and Guillermo Luna Varela – tortured and killed less than one week after the assassination of Regina Martínez Pérez – is deeply disturbing, and reflects an alarming state of affairs in the state of Veracruz," she said.

The bodies of the Boca Del Rio journalists were found nearing World Press Freedom Day. Bokova said, “That these gruesome crimes have been committed on the eve of World Press Freedom Day – a day on which we honour the vital role played by journalists in upholding democratic values, protecting citizens’ rights to be informed and calling those in power to account – makes the situation all the more intolerable."

Bokova continued in the statement to say, “I condemn these three murders in the strongest possible terms and urge the Mexican authorities to act quickly and decisively to find those responsible. Impunity is not an option."

Article 19, a group focused on the freedom of expression and information, expressed their outrage of the Boca del Rio incident, "--the Mexican authorities have consistently failed to fulfill their international obligations to guarantee the free exercise of freedom of expression and the mechanisms currently in place do not address the central problem, which is the impunity that follows these crimes." They also said the authorities of Veracruz did not take the necessary steps in resolving the case.

== See also ==
- Mexican drug war
- List of journalists killed in Mexico
- Humberto Millán Salazar
