= 2012 Yucatán gubernatorial election =

Mexican local electoral event

The 2012 gubernatorial election in the Mexican state of Yucatán were held on Sunday, July 1, 2012. Incumbent Yucatán Governor Ivonne Ortega Pacheco of the Institutional Revolutionary Party (PRI) is retiring due to mandatory term limits, which limit all Mexican state governors to one, six-year term in office. The Yucatán gubernatorial election coincided with the 2012 Mexican presidential and general elections.

== Candidates ==
| Party/Coalition | Candidates | Votes |
|---|---|---|
| National Action Party | Joaquín Díaz Mena | 383,838 |
| Orgullo y Compromiso por Yucatán; *Institutional Revolutionary Party; *Ecologist Green Party of Mexico; *Social Democratic Party | Rolando Zapata Bello | 469,213 |
| Party of the Democratic Revolution; Citizens' Movement; Labor Party | Eric Eber Villanueva Mukul | 48,928 |
| New Alliance Party | Olivia Guzmán Durán | 8,264 |
