= 2012 Guanajuato gubernatorial election =

The 2012 gubernatorial election in the Mexican state of Guanajuato was held on Sunday, July 1, 2012. Incumbent Guanajuato Governor Juan Manuel Oliva of the National Action Party (PAN) is retiring due to mandatory term limits, which limit all Mexican state governors to one, six-year term in office. The Guanajuato gubernatorial election coincided with the 2012 Mexican presidential and general elections.

Miguel Márquez Márquez of PAN won the election. He was sworn into office on September 26, 2012.

== Gubernatorial candidates ==
Party/Coalition	Candidates
National Action Party; New Alliance Party	Miguel Márquez Márquez
Institutional Revolutionary Party; Ecologist Green Party of Mexico	Juan Ignacio Torres Landa
Party of the Democratic Revolution	Arnulfo Montes de la Vega
Labor Party	Ernesto Prieto
Citizens' Movement	Enrique Eguiarte Alvarado
