= Regina Martínez Pérez =

Mexican journalist and murder victim (1963–2012)

- Born: 7 September 1963; Rafael Lucio, Veracruz, Mexico
- Died: 28 April 2012 (aged 48); Xalapa, Veracruz, Mexico
- Cause of death: Asphyxia by strangulation
- Education: Universidad Veracruzana
- Occupation: Journalist
- Years active: 1980s–2012
- Employers: Televisión Rural Mexicana; El Sol de Chiapas; Número Uno; Cuatro Más; Política; Diario Xalapa; La Jornada; Proceso

Regina Martínez Pérez (7 September 1963 – 28 April 2012) was a Mexican journalist and veteran crime reporter for Proceso, a center-left Mexican news magazine known for its critical reporting of the social and political establishment.

Born in a small town in the state of Veracruz, Martínez Pérez left her hometown to study journalism at Universidad Veracruzana. After graduating from university, she went to work at a state-owned television company in Chiapas in the early 1980s, but she encountered various forms of censorship that convinced her to pursue a career in print media. After five years in Chiapas, Martínez Pérez relocated to Veracruz and worked for several local newspapers. In Veracruz, Martínez Pérez faced several challenges of censorship by the political establishment for her direct reporting, and particularly for being an outspoken critic of human rights violations, government corruption, abuse of authority, and for her in-depth coverage of the drug trafficking organizations that operate in Veracruz.

Early in the morning of 28 April 2012, Martínez Pérez was murdered inside her home in Xalapa after being severely beaten. A suspect was arrested in October 2012 and publicly confessed to the murder, while the Mexican authorities concluded that the motive of the murder was theft. However, the suspect later retracted his confession and stated that he had been tortured and threatened by officials to lie and admit to the murder. Investigators have relied solely on the suspect's confession to incriminate him; the DNA and fingerprint samples collected at the murder scene did not match the suspect's according to sources close to Committee to Protect Journalists.

The Committee to Protect Journalists, Proceso magazine, and several journalists and press freedom organizations have complained about irregularities in the investigation and question the legitimacy of the whole case. They believe that their colleague's murder was part of a campaign of intimidation against those who investigate alleged links between drug traffickers and politicians in the state of Veracruz.

== Early life ==
Regina Martínez Pérez was born in the small town of Rafael Lucio, Veracruz on 7 September 1963. Her parents, María Lorenza Pérez Vázquez and Florencio Martínez Romero, had 11 children. From a young age, Martínez Pérez wanted to be a journalist; after graduating from high school, she left her hometown to study journalism at Universidad Veracruzana (UV). Shortly after graduating, she moved to the state of Chiapas to work as a reporter for Mexican Rural Television (Televisión Rural Mexicana – TRM), a state-owned television company, in the early 1980s. Martínez Pérez was part of a group of former students from the UV who were hired by the government to work at the television company. But after demanding better working conditions and facing censorship from the company, she left the company to pursue a career in print media.

== Career ==
Martínez Pérez worked for several newspapers in Chiapas, like El Sol de Chiapas and Número Uno, for five years before she returned to her home state of Veracruz, where she became the editorial assistant of the news channel Cuatro Más. The journalist then left to work for the daily Política, where she covered topics on security and social justice. Martínez Pérez was also a journalist and investigative crime reporter for the Diario de Xalapa newspaper. Her journalistic career in Veracruz, however, faced several challenges from the political elite; governors and government secretaries wanted to censor Martínez Pérez for criticizing their administration. Instead of self-censoring like other media outlets in the state, she became known for her direct reporting style, which frequently angered the authorities. She wrote over 63 reports covering political assassinations, natural disasters, authority abuses, human right violations, corruption, and government mismanagement.

After working for the Diario de Xalapa, Martínez Pérez became a local correspondent for the newspaper La Jornada in the state and later joined the news magazine Proceso, where she worked for more than ten years. The news magazine is well known for having an "anti-establishment publication" style, and often runs articles that criticize politicians across the country. Many of its reporters have been threatened in the past for their journalistic coverage.

In Proceso, Martínez Pérez was an open critic of government corruption and abuse of authority, and wrote extensively on the local drug trade and organized crime. She was particularly known in Mexico for her in-depth reporting on the Mexican drug cartels and how they corrupted government officials in Veracruz. Among her last publications before her murder was a political profile about Reynaldo Escobar Pérez and Alejandro Montano, two politicians of the Institutional Revolutionary Party (PRI) who were running for office in Congress. A week before her murder she had also written about an incident in which the Mexican Navy arrested nine policemen in the state who were allegedly working for a drug trafficking organization, the arrest of a high-profile leader of Los Zetas drug cartel known as Comandante Chaparro, and a story involving mayor Martín Padua Zúñiga from the National Action Party (PAN) who was arrested with drug traffickers following a gunfight with the Mexican Army.

== Death ==
Mentioned locations within Mexico relative to the capital Mexico City.

Martínez Pérez was murdered early in the morning of 28 April 2012 in her home in the Felipe Carrillo Puerto neighborhood in Xalapa, the capital of Veracruz. When police went to her home to investigate in response to a neighbor's call about her door being open all day, Martínez Pérez's corpse was found on the bathroom floor. According to official reports, she had been severely beaten around her face and ribs, and then strangled to death. The cause of death was asphyxia by strangulation. At the time of her death, the Mexican authorities said they were investigating all the possible motives behind her assassination, including personal motives and theft, and that they would investigate whether the killing was work-related.

In October 2012, new details emerged in her murder investigation. Charges were brought against Jorge Antonio Hernández Silva (alias El Silva) and José Adrián Hernández Domínguez (alias El Jarocho), two men who were alleged to have murdered Martínez Pérez. Silva, who had already been arrested, confessed to the murder. According to Silva's confession, the reporter knew Domínguez and therefore allowed both of them into her house on the night of her murder. After some conversation, Domínguez grew angry and started beating Martínez Pérez with the intention of forcing her to reveal where she hid her money and other valuable possessions. Silva then joined his accomplice in the beating until they killed her. Investigators said that the attackers had plunged the journalist's head into a toilet bowl, hit her on the head several times with brass knuckles, and threw her against a tub, where she cracked her skull. Martínez Pérez unsuccessfully tried to defend herself by grabbing a kitchen knife and stabbing one of the attackers in the forearm, but they managed to overpower her as she only weighed 108 lbs (48.9 kg). Both men then stole a plasma TV, two cellphones, a laptop computer, a camera and a small box, and the journalist's wristband from her home before leaving the crime scene.

=== Investigation ===
When Silva was arrested in October 2012, he confessed to the murder of Martínez Pérez. Investigators and authorities in Veracruz concluded that the journalist was killed during a robbery. When placed before a judge, Silva retracted his confession and stated that he had been tortured, held hostage for over a week, and threatened by Veracruz authorities in order to make him confess to the assassination. Silva said that officials had threatened to kill his mother, his last remaining family member. During a press conference, the Veracruz authorities relied solely on the confession of Silva as evidence against him. None of them made references to DNA, fingerprint, or blood samples from the murder scene. Sources close to the Committee to Protect Journalists stated that the samples collected at the crime scene do not match those of any of the criminals listed on the national database. This should rule out both Silva and Domínguez (who is still at large) from the murder, because both of them have extensive criminal records. Proceso news magazine immediately took a critical stance toward the investigation and said that they did not believe that the Veracruz authorities were capable of completing a clean investigation. The committee to Protect Journalists believes that the murder case was possibly fabricated, and that Silva was likely used as a scapegoat by the authorities. Just a few items were stolen from Martínez Pérez's house while valuable goods were left behind, so they allege that theft was not the real motive behind her murder. According to Mexican law, Proceso was allowed to participate in the investigation, so they appointed a top journalist to cover every detail of it. Proceso has complained that the Veracruz authorities have lied to them regarding possible developments in the investigation.

Six months after Martínez Pérez's slaying, the Veracruz authorities stated that her murder was also a crime of passion. According to the reports, Domínguez was the alleged boyfriend of the journalist. In April 2013, Proceso stated that it had received classified information that its senior editor who was covering the investigation, Jorge Carrasco, was a possible target by corrupt Veracruz officials. Reportedly, members of the administration of Governor Javier Duarte de Ochoa were allowed to carry out "hostile actions against the reporter in response to his most recent publication on the Regina Martínez case." Sources close to the news magazine alleged that officials were plotting to kill the reporter while he was in the nation's capital, Mexico City. The Veracruz authorities responded by stating that the accusations were false and asked Proceso to provide evidence for its claims. The governor promised that he would investigate the threats, and the journalist went into hiding with several armed bodyguards. That same month, Silva was sentenced to 38 years and 2 months in prison for the murder. The judge also ordered the murderer to pay roughly US$8,000 in reparations for her death and the stolen possessions. Proceso, however, expressed its doubt on the murder case and trial once again, stating that they did not believe the court was sentencing the right man.

Many journalists continue to dispute the facts in the case, believing that the murder was retribution for reports by Martínez Pérez on drug trafficking and political corruption; they have questioned the investigation by the state of Veracruz. Proceso magazine's reporter said the investigators never explored the possibility that her journalism may have been the motive behind her murder. Press freedom organizations across the world have complained that the case was designed to cover up the crime instead of clarifying what actually happened. "We don't believe them [the authorities]", said Proceso reporter Jorge Carrasco on behalf of the whole newspaper magazine. The case was the subject of a podcast by A Safer World for Truth and openDemocracy released in December 2021.

== Context ==
=== Background ===
Veracruz is the most dangerous place in Mexico for journalists; at least nine journalists have been killed since Governor Javier Duarte de Ochoa took office in 2010, many of them by the Los Zetas drug cartel. Most of these reporters were killed under unclear circumstances, and few arrests have been made in their respective investigations. Given the high levels of corruption, criminal impunity, and drug-related attacks against the press all across Veracruz, many local journalists have decided to leave the state and relocate in other parts of Mexico. The atmosphere in Veracruz has also forced many media outlets to self-censor and stop reporting on the drug violence. With traditional reporting being too dangerous and intimidating, social media and blogs are often the only outlets for reporting serious crimes.

The state of Veracruz used to be controlled by the Gulf Cartel before business was handed over to Los Zetas, their former allies, when they went to war across northeastern Mexico in early 2010. Since 2011, much of the drug-related violence is a result of the turf wars between Los Zetas and the Sinaloa Cartel, a drug trafficking organization based in western Mexico and headed by Joaquín El Chapo Guzmán, Mexico's most-wanted drug lord. These criminal groups are fighting for Veracruz because of its lucrative smuggling routes for contraband, drug trafficking, and illegal migrants heading to the United States. It has one of Mexico's busiest ports, and officials say that there is no way they can inspect all of the containers that come in by ship. Corruption is also widespread in Veracruz; investigators have been slow and reluctant to link the Martínez Pérez murder to organized crime. According to the committee to Protect Journalists, Veracruz is by "general consensus one of the most politically corrupt [states in Mexico]". Mexico was ruled by the Institutional Revolutionary Party (PRI) for 71 years until it lost the presidential seat to the conservative National Action Party (PAN) in 2000. The PRI has long been criticized for being corrupt and allowing the drug trafficking organizations in the country to operate freely if they maintained relative peace. Although the PRI lost the national presidency in 2000, some states remained under the rule of PRI politicians. "Democratic transition never quite reached Veracruz," a state of 8 million people. PRI governors in Veracruz continued to rule with the state with tactics largely abandoned by the PRI at a national level.

=== Journalists assassinated ===
Martínez Pérez was the fifth journalist killed in Veracruz during the sexenio of Governor Javier Duarte de Ochoa, which started in 2010. The first journalist assassinated was Noel López Olguín (March 2011), followed by Miguel Ángel López Velasco and his son Miseal (June 2011). Then Yolanda Ordaz de la Cruz was killed (July 2011), followed by Martínez Pérez (April 2012). Just a few days after her death, the mutilated bodies of four media professionals were discovered. There would be still another journalist murdered in Veracruz: Víctor Manuel Báez (June 2012). Although not officially counted in the death toll of journalists, at least three journalists have been kidnapped and have remained in captivity since 2010: Manuel Gabriel Fonseca Hernández (September 2011), Miguel Morales Estrada (July 2012), and Sergio Landa Rosales (November 2012).

Nearly 100 journalists, bloggers and writers have been kidnapped or killed in Mexico since 2000, making the country one of the most dangerous places on the planet in which to be a journalist. Most of these crimes, too, have remained unsolved, and only a few perpetrators have been brought to justice.

On 22 June 2012, former President Felipe Calderón signed the "Law for the Protection of Human Rights Defenders and Journalists" (Spanish: Ley Para la Protección de Personas Defensoras de Derechos Humanos y Periodistas), which makes attacks against journalists a federal crime and establishes a fund for investigating these crimes. The law also establishes several preventative measures to protect journalists, such as providing them bodyguards, armored vehicles, bullet-proof vests, security cameras, wireless equipment and satellite cellphones to communicate in case of any danger, and temporary relocation if deemed necessary. Congress passed a law on 7 June 2012 that allowed the federal government to investigate attacks against journalists, crimes which used to be under the jurisdiction of state and municipal forces.

== Reactions ==
Irina Bokova, who is the Director-General of UNESCO, said, "News of the murders of Gabriel Huge and Guillermo Luna Varela – tortured and killed less than one week after the murder of Regina Martínez Pérez – is deeply disturbing, and reflects an alarming state of affairs in the state of Veracruz. That these gruesome crimes have been committed on the eve of World Press Freedom Day – a day on which we honour the vital role played by journalists in upholding democratic values, protecting citizens' rights to be informed and calling those in power to account – makes the situation all the more intolerable. I condemn these three murders in the strongest possible terms and urge the Mexican authorities to act quickly and decisively to find those responsible. Impunity is not an option."

Proceso magazine wrote, in reaction to its colleague's murder, "The murder of journalist Regina Martinez Perez, on Saturday April 28, is the result of a broken country, a situation of daily violence in which extreme acts are not the exception but the rule daily."

On 29 April 2013, the Chamber of Deputies of Mexico observed a moment of silence to remember Regina Martínez, after a proposal made by Manuel Rafael Huerta from the Labor Party (PT). Huerta mentioned in his petition that a year after the murder the circumstances were still unclear and the official version from the government of Veracruz was not to be believed. The president of the chamber left those comments out, but found the proposal relevant and invited deputies to join in the minute of silence.

In 2020 Forbidden Stories coordinated reports of international journalists on Mexican drug cartels, which included continuation of Martínez Pérez's work.

In 2022, Katherine Corcoran, former AP Mexico Bureau Chief, published In the Mouth of the Wolf: A Murder, A Cover-Up, and the True Cost of Silencing the Press, a biography about Martínez's life, journalism, and controversial death.

== See also ==
- Mexican drug war
- List of journalists killed in Mexico
- List of unsolved murders (2000–present)
