= Adrián Rivera Pérez =

Mexican politician

- Born: 8 July 1962 (age 64); Mexico City, Mexico
- Education: Universidad Autónoma del Estado de Morelos
- Occupations: Deputy and Senator
- Political party: PAN

Adrián Rivera Pérez (born 8 July 1962) is a Mexican politician affiliated with the PAN. As of 2013 he served as Senator of the LX and LXI Legislatures of the Mexican Congress representing Morelos. He also served as Deputy during the LVIII Legislature. He was Presidente Municipal (mayor) of Cuernavaca from 2003 to 2006.
