= 2012 Copa de México de Naciones =

2012 Copa México de Naciones
Copa México de Naciones Sub-15

Tournament details
- Host country: Mexico
- Dates: 18 June – 24 June
- Teams: 8 (from 4 confederations)
- Venue: 3 (in 2 host cities)

Tournament statistics
- Matches played: 16
- Goals scored: 15 (0.94 per match)
- Top scorer(s): (Colombia) Jhon Fredy Miranda (3 goals)

The 2012 Copa de México de Naciones is the 1st edition of the Copa México de Naciones Sub-15 and it took in Mexico from June 18 till June 24.

The final match was between Mexico and Colombia in the Estadio Nemesio Diez, winning Mexico in the round of penalties.

== Participating teams ==
- Mexico (host)
- Spain
- Nigeria
- Chile
- Colombia
- Costa Rica
- Canada
- United States

== Results ==
=== Group stage ===
Tie-breaking criteria

The ranking of each team in each group was determined as follows:

a) greatest number of points obtained in all group matches;
b) goal difference in all group matches;
c) greatest number of goals scored in all group matches.

Had two or more teams been equal on the basis of the above three criteria, their rankings would have been determined as follows:

d) greatest number of points obtained in the group matches between the teams concerned;
e) goal difference resulting from the group matches between the teams concerned;
f) greater number of goals scored in all group matches between the teams concerned;
g) drawing of lots by the FIFA Organising Committee.

==== Group A ====
Team	Pld	W	D	L	GF	GA	GD	Pts
Mexico	1	1	0	0	3	0	+3	3
Nigeria	1	1	0	0	3	1	+2	3
Chile	1	0	0	1	1	3	−2	0
Canada	1	0	0	1	0	3	−3	0

18 June 2012

Mexico	3–0	Canada

18 June 2012

Nigeria	3–1	Chile

19 June 2012

Mexico	3–0	Chile

19 June 2012

Canada	0–3	Nigeria

20 June 2009

Mexico	3–0	Nigeria

20 June 2009

Chile	0–0	Canada

==== Group B ====
Team	Pld	W	D	L	GF	GA	GD	Pts
Colombia	1	1	0	0	7	0	+7	3
Spain	1	1	0	0	1	0	+1	3
United States	1	0	0	1	0	1	−1	0
Costa Rica	1	0	0	1	0	7	−7	0

18 June 2012

Colombia	7–0	Costa Rica

18 June 2012

United States	0–1	Spain

19 June 2012

Spain	3–2	Colombia

19 June 2012

United States	1–3	Costa Rica

20 June 2011

Colombia	0–0	United States

20 June 2011

Costa Rica	1–4	Spain

=== Semi-finals ===
22 June 2012

Mexico	4-5	Mexico

22 June 2012

Spain	3-5	Colombia

=== Finals ===
24 June 2012

Mexico	6-5	Colombia
