= Fernando Guzmán Pérez =

Mexican politician (born 1956)

- Born: 25 January 1956 (age 70); Mexico City, Mexico
- Occupation: Politician
- Political party: PAN

Fernando Antonio Guzmán Pérez Peláez (born 25 January 1956) is a Mexican politician affiliated with the National Action Party. As of 2014 he served as Deputy of the LIX Legislature of the Mexican Congress as a plurinominal representative.
