= Reynaldo Escobar Pérez =

Mexican politician

Reynaldo Gaudencio Escobar Pérez was a Mexican politician. Previously, he was Secretary of Government in the state of Veracruz, and was the state's attorney general, until he resigned on October 8, 2011. He was also the former mayor of Xalapa. He died on 25 May 2025.

== See also ==
- Veracruz state election, 2000

Preceded by Rafael Villalpando	Municipal President of Xalapa, Veracruz; 2000 - 2004	Succeeded by Armida Ramírez Corral
