= Yolanda Ordaz de la Cruz =

Mexican crime journalist and murder victim (1963–2011)

- Yolanda Ordaz de la Cruz
- Born: 1963; Juchitán de Zaragoza, Oaxaca, Mexico
- Disappeared: 24 July 2011; Veracruz, Veracruz, Mexico
- Died: 26 July 2011 (aged 47–48); Boca del Río, Veracruz, Mexico
- Cause of death: Murder
- Resting place: Juchitán de Zaragoza, Oaxaca, Mexico
- Education: Media studies at Universidad Veracruzana
- Occupation: Crime journalist
- Years active: 28+
- Employer: Notiver
- Children: 2

Yolanda Ordaz de la Cruz (1963 – 26 July 2011) was a crime reporter who had worked for nearly three decades for Notiver, the largest-circulation newspaper in Veracruz, Mexico. She was kidnapped on July 24, 2011, and her corpse was found beheaded two days later in the neighboring port town of Boca del Río. The crime remains unsolved with no charges brought and different hypotheses in existence. The general attorney of the state of Veracruz, Reynaldo Escobar, said that the investigation was considering the alleged relationship of some journalists with organized crime. Notiver saw these declarations as a menace to journalists and linked the slaying to Ordaz's investigation of the murder of three colleagues a month earlier.

== Background ==
Yolanda Ordaz de la Cruz was the fourth journalist killed in Veracruz in 2011 as a result of the Mexican drug war, where the first was Noel López Olguín in March. On July 20, Notiver crime columnist Miguel Ángel López Velasco, his wife and their son Miseal López Solana, who also worked at Notiver as a crime photographer, were murdered in their home. In 2012 drug trafficking related violence increased in Veracruz, including the murder of Proceso's journalist Regina Martínez in April and the killing of four media professionals in May, including Guillermo Luna Varela, who had been colleague of Ordaz at Notiver.

The state of Veracruz faces crime primarily from Los Zetas drug cartel. Since early 2010, there have been multiple shootings and gunfights which have taken place as part of the territorial fight between Los Zetas and the Gulf Cartel.

Ordaz had been a close friend to the López family, as she and Miguel López had worked together for years. Just a week before her death, Ordaz had questioned Escobar about the lack of results in the investigation about her colleagues' murders. At the time of her own murder, she was looking into her co-workers' deaths.

== Death ==
Ordaz and her colleagues worked for Notiver in Veracruz, Veracruz.

Yolanda Ordaz received several letters with death threats before she was killed. The journalist was reported missing by her relatives on the night of Saturday July 23, 2011. She had told them she was going out to cover a story and never returned home. On Tuesday July 26, 2011, her decapitated body was found with signs of torture, and her head was found behind the offices of the Imagen del Golfo news station, in Boca del Río. There was a note written in Spanish saying "Friends can also betray you. Sincerely, Carranza." Juan Carlos Carranza, former transit police officer and allegedly a local leader of Los Zetas, had been signaled by the general attorney as the main suspect of the murder of the family López Velasco.

The case remains open and the motivation for the crime is still unclear. The day after the murder, Escobar said that Ordaz's murder was a settling of scores between crime gangs, but he did not present any proof. Journalist also published similar allegations in his column. Notiver publicly requested the resignation of Escobar for these declarations. A few days after the crime the Mexican army killed two alleged drug cartel members, and the prosecutor said that one of them had an ID document of Yolanda Ordaz. Additionally, two accusatory videos were published anonymously on the internet, mentioning Ordaz as a mediator for Los Zetas. Other journalists speaking anonymously told McClatchy that López and Ordaz may have been passing information to military intelligence and had been killed by crime gangs in vengeance.

== Reactions ==
Many reporters for the Notiver newspapers went into hiding or did not show up for work after their three co-workers had been killed.

The reporting community demanded a thorough investigation of the deaths of their fellow employees so as to bring their killers to justice.

Director-General of UNESCO Irina Bokova said, "The latest case in an increasing global trend of women journalists being targeted, which I am deeply concerned about. It is essential that the authorities investigate the alarming number of attacks on reporters in Veracruz and bring their culprits to justice."

== See also ==
- List of journalists killed in Mexico
