= 2012 Mexican general election =

- 1 July 2012
- Presidential election
- Turnout: 63.08% (▲4.53pp)
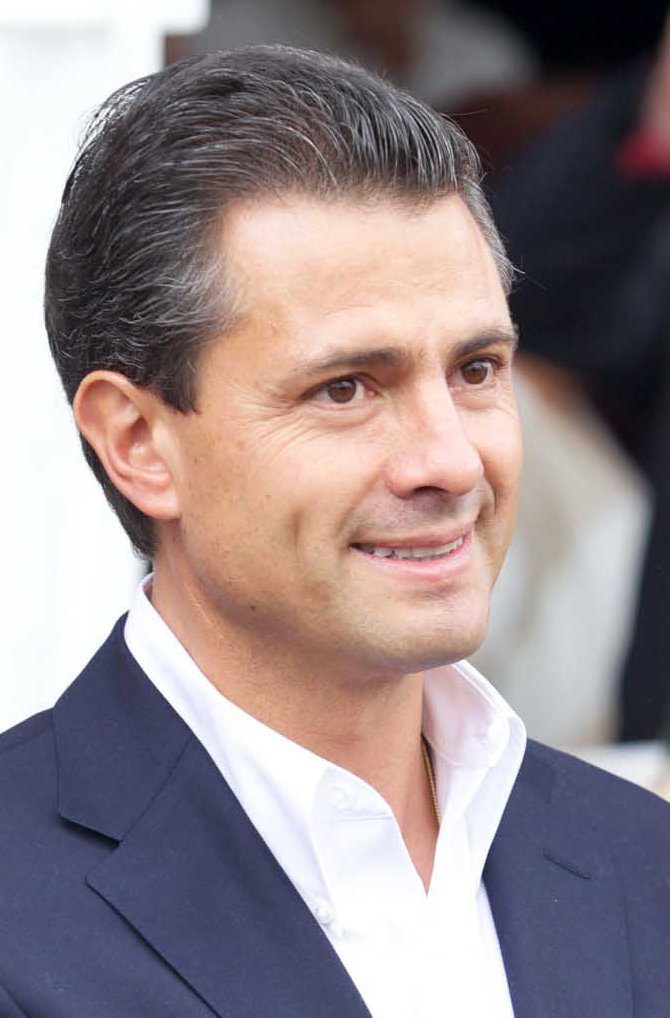

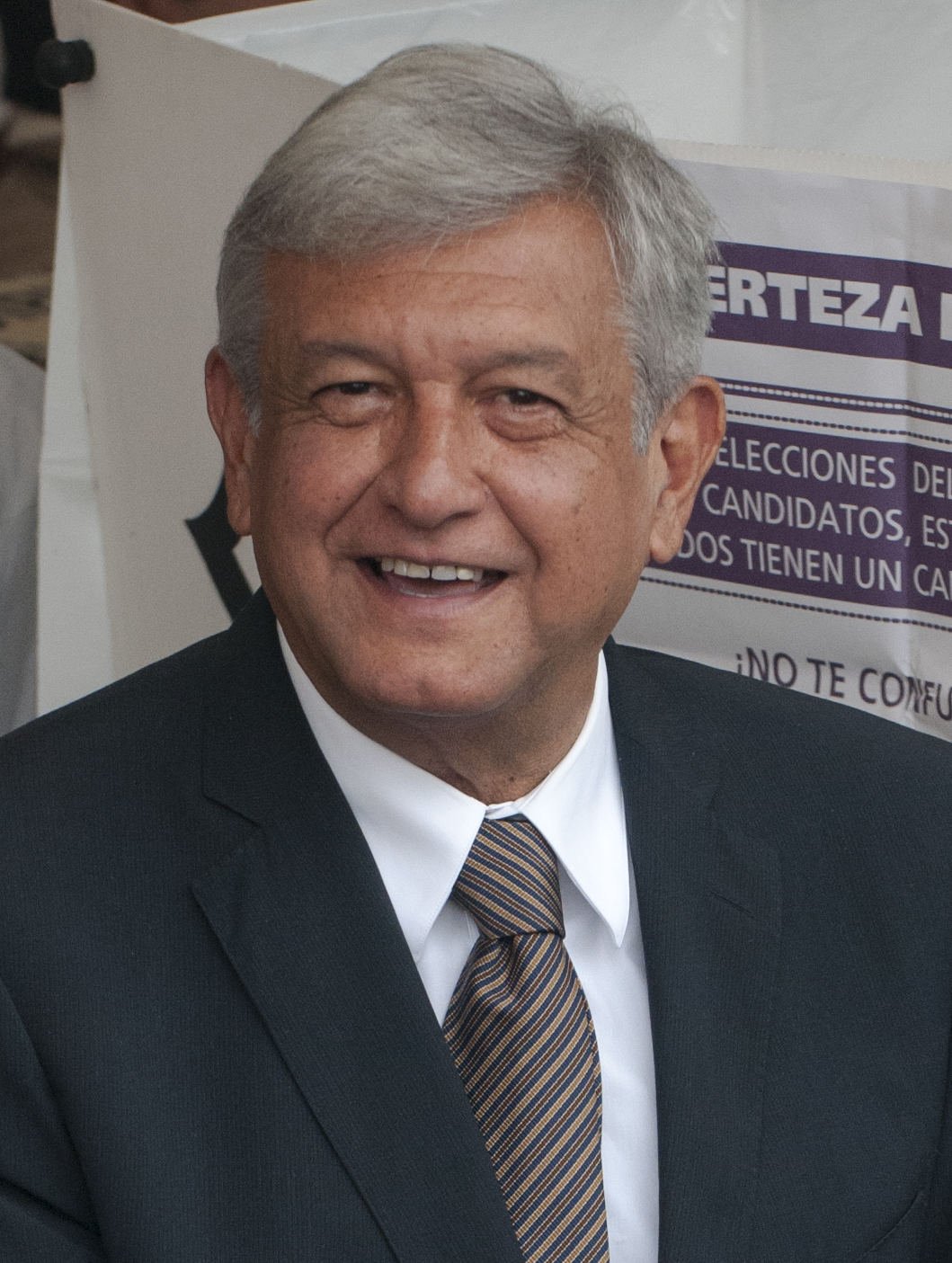

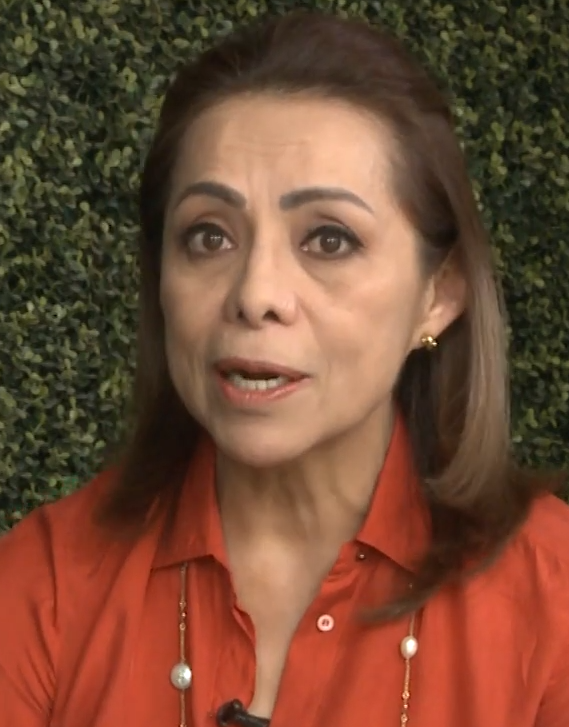
| Nominee | Enrique Peña Nieto | Andrés Manuel López Obrador | Josefina Vázquez Mota |
| Party | PRI | PRD | PAN |
| Alliance | Commitment to Mexico | Progressive Movement |
| Popular vote | 19,158,592 | 15,848,827 | 12,732,630 |
| Percentage | 39.17% | 32.41% | 26.03% |
- Peña (34335) López (18867) Vázquez (11249) Quadri (3) Tie (256) No data (6793)
President before election
Felipe Calderón
PAN
Elected President
Enrique Peña Nieto
PRI
- Senate
- All 128 seats in the Senate of the Republic; 65 seats needed for a majority
| Party | Leader | Vote % | Seats | +/– |
Commitment to Mexico (61 seats)
| PRI | Pedro Joaquín Coldwell | 33.00 | 52 | +19 |
| PVEM | Carlos Alberto Puente Salas | 6.06 | 9 | +3 |
Progressive Movement (28 seats)
| PRD | Jesús Zambrano Grijalva | 19.69 | 22 | −4 |
| PT | Alberto Anaya | 4.92 | 4 | 0 |
| MC | Luis Walton Aburto | 4.26 | 2 | −4 |
Other (39 seats)
| PAN | Gustavo Madero Muñoz | 27.87 | 38 | −14 |
| PNA | Luis Castro Obregón | 3.91 | 1 | 0 |
This lists parties that won seats. See the complete results below.
Results by state
- Chamber of Deputies
- All 500 seats in the Chamber of Deputies; 251 seats needed for a majority
| Party | Leader | Vote % | Seats | +/– |
Commitment to Mexico (241 seats)
| PRI | Pedro Joaquín Coldwell | 33.57 | 207 | −30 |
| PVEM | Carlos Alberto Puente Salas | 6.42 | 34 | +13 |
Progressive Movement (135 seats)
| PRD | Jesús Zambrano Grijalva | 19.34 | 100 | +29 |
| PT | Alberto Anaya | 4.83 | 19 | +6 |
| MC | Luis Walton Aburto | 4.21 | 16 | +10 |
Other (124 seats)
| PAN | Gustavo Madero Muñoz | 27.26 | 114 | −29 |
| PNA | Luis Castro Obregón | 4.29 | 10 | +1 |
This lists parties that won seats. See the complete results below.
Results by constituency

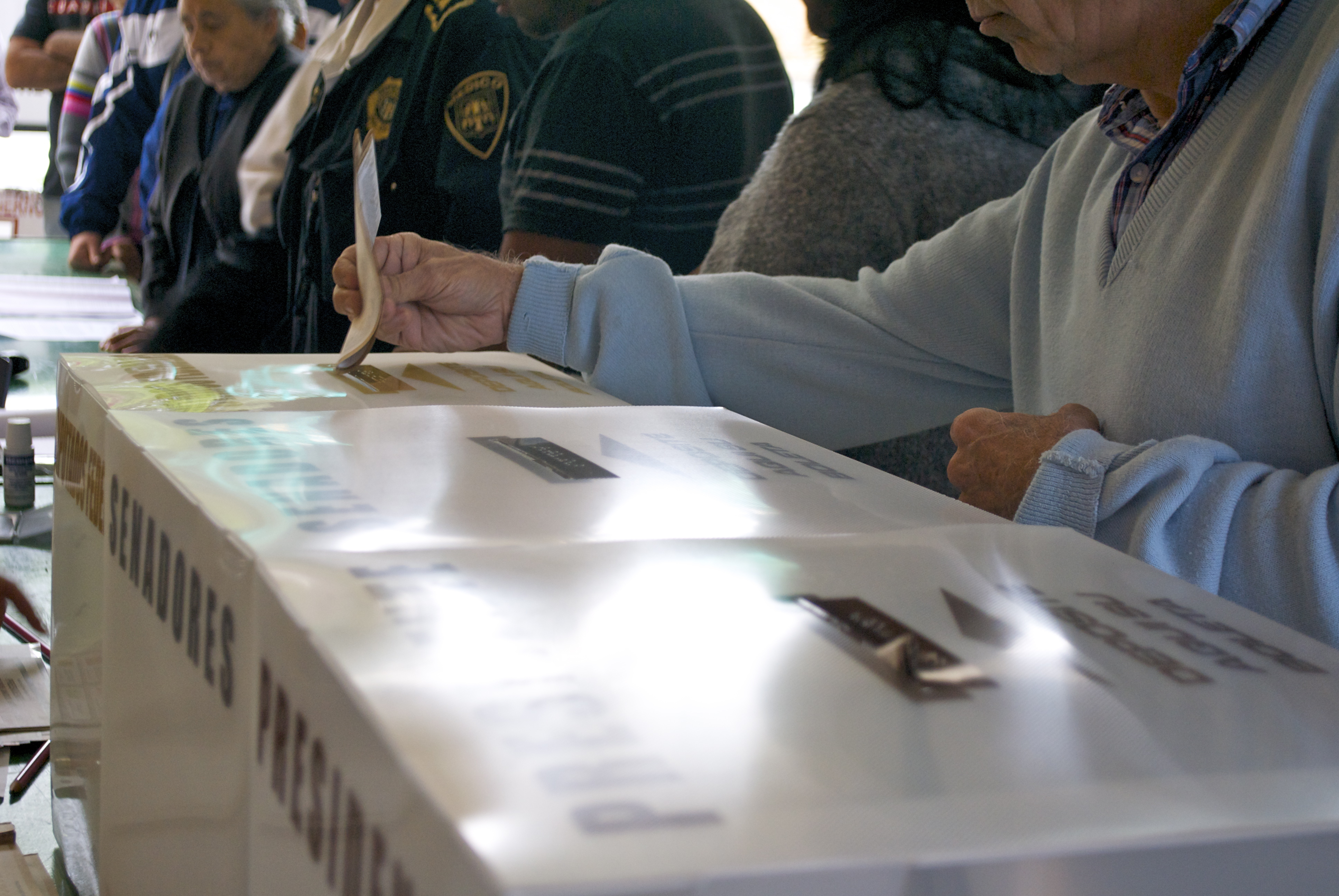
Citizen voting in the ballot box for president in Mexico City

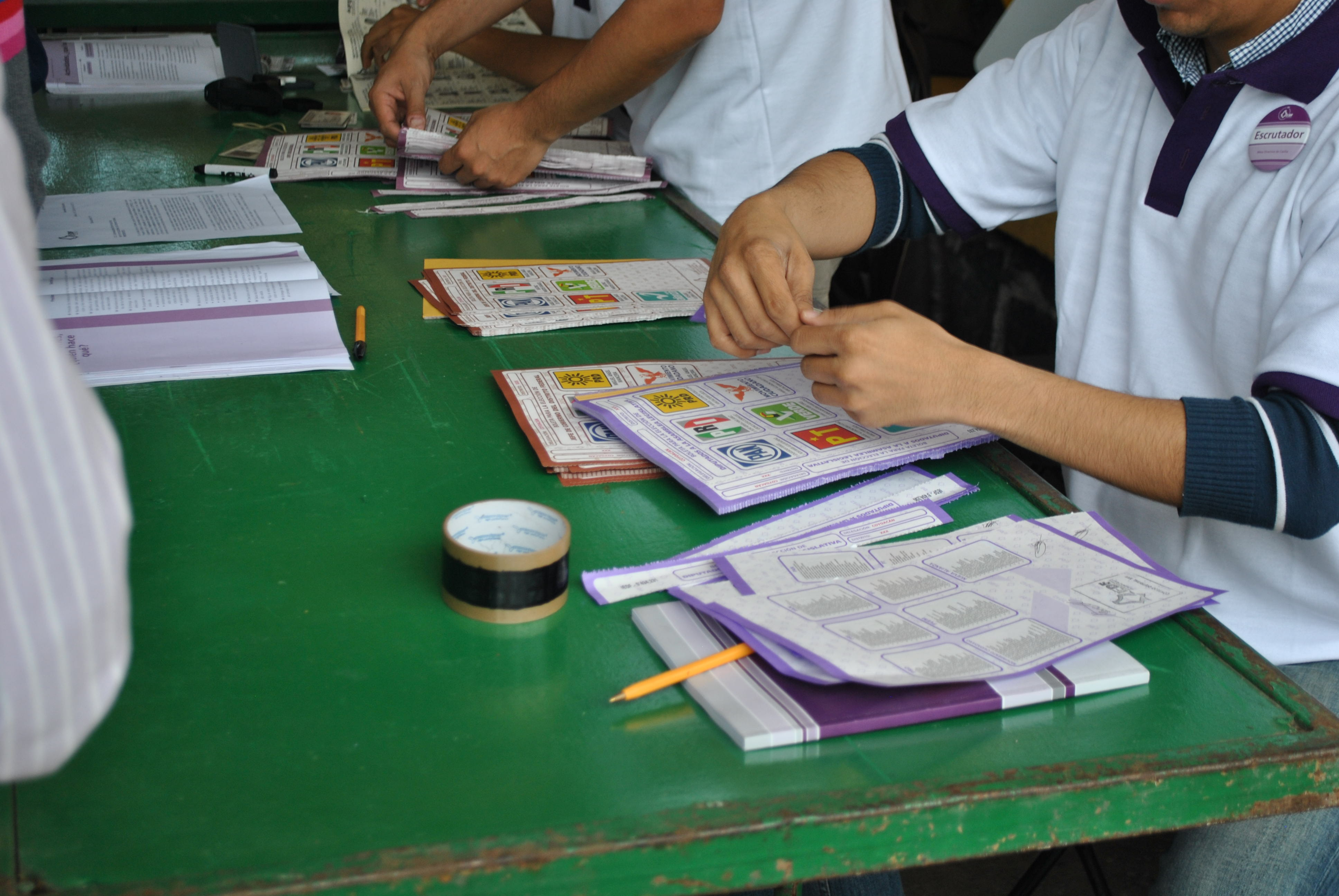
Ballots for voting in Mexico City. 1 July 2012.

General elections were held in Mexico on Sunday, 1 July 2012. Voters went to the polls to elect a new President of the Republic to serve a six-year term, replacing Felipe Calderón, 500 members of the Chamber of Deputies and 128 members of the Mexican Senate.

Several local ballots were held on the same day, including the election of a new Head of Government and new Legislative Assembly of the Federal District, gubernatorial elections in six states (Chiapas, Guanajuato, Jalisco, Morelos, Tabasco and Yucatán) and municipal and local congressional elections several states.

== Electoral reform ==
In December 2009, president Felipe Calderón attempted to pass a bill aimed at reducing the number of legislators in both chambers and another mechanism for the presidential election, which did not pass. If approved, the following reforms would have been implemented:

- Second round voting in case no presidential candidate receives an absolute majority of the votes.
- 96 Senators of the Republic, 3 for each state, elected by plurality for a period of six years, renewable once.
- 400 Federal Deputies (240 by plurality voting in single-member districts and 160 by proportional representation) elected for a period of three years with possibility of reelection.

However, the bill did not pass and the number of seats in Congress and the electoral system remained unchanged. The 500 members of the Chamber of Deputies were elected by two methods; 300 are elected by plurality voting in single-member districts, and 200 are elected by proportional representation in five 40-seat constituencies.

== Presidential candidates ==
The following are individuals who have either formally announced that they are running for president in 2012, or have formed an exploratory committee for a possible presidential run in 2012.

=== National Action Party (PAN) Nomination ===
Nominee:

- Josefina Vázquez Mota, Representative from Mexico City

Other pre-candidates:

- Ernesto Cordero, former Secretary of Finance and Public Credit from Mexico City
- Santiago Creel, Senator from Mexico City

==== Pre-candidates who withdrew from contest ====
- Javier Lozano Alarcón, Secretary of Labor from Puebla (withdrew 21 July 2011)
- Alonso Lujambio, Secretary of Public Education from Mexico City (withdrew 29 August 2011)
- Emilio González Márquez, Governor of Jalisco (withdrew 22 September 2011)

On 5 February, Josefina Vázquez Mota was announced as PAN presidential candidate following her victory in the internal selection process. Vázquez Mota defeated Ernesto Cordero, who was considered to be favored by President Felipe Calderón, by an approximately 55% to 38% margin.

As coordinator of the PAN's parliamentary group in the Chamber of Deputies, Vázquez Mota's support among fellow deputies was partially credited for her victory. Her victory made her the first woman nominated for president by a major party in Mexico.

| Candidate | Votes | % |
|---|---|---|
| Josefina Vázquez Mota | 264,503 | 53.9% |
| Ernesto Cordero | 190,722 | 38.9% |
| Santiago Creel | 29,870 | 6.1% |
Note: Results represent vote with 96% of ballots counted

=== Party of the Democratic Revolution (PRD) Nomination ===
Nominee:

- Andrés Manuel López Obrador, former Head of Government of the Federal District from Tabasco.

Pre-candidates:

- Marcelo Ebrard, Head of Government of the Federal District (withdrew 15 November 2011)

Other pre-candidates:

Never publicly announced intentions to run but was considered a likely contender.
- Cuauhtémoc Cárdenas, former Governor of Michoacán and perennial candidate

=== Institutional Revolutionary Party (PRI) Nomination ===
Nominee:

- Enrique Peña Nieto, former Governor of the State of Mexico

Pre-candidates:

- Manlio Fabio Beltrones, former Governor of Sonora (withdrew 21 November 2011)

=== New Alliance Party (PNA) Nomination ===
Nominee:

- Gabriel Quadri de la Torre

== Opinion polls ==
| Date | Polling company | Vázquez Mota (PAN) | Peña Nieto (PRI-PVEM) | López Obrador (PRD-MC-PT) | Quadri (PANAL) | Remarks |
|---|---|---|---|---|---|---|
| November 2011 | Reforma | 25.0% | 49.0% | 26.0% | – | Unnominated PAN and PANAL candidates. |
| November 2011 | Covarrubias y Asociados | 12.6% | 56.3% | 31% | – | Unnominated PAN and PANAL candidates. |
| February 2012 | Grupo Impacto Inteligente 360º | 34.4% | 47.4% | 18.2% | – | Unnominated PAN and PANAL candidates. |
| February 2012 | Consulta Mitofsky | 29.5% | 48.5% | 21.0% | 1.0% | |
| February 2012 | Buendía & Laredo | 32.0% | 48.0% | 20.0% | 0.0% | |
| February 2012 | Covarrubias y Asociados | 27.2% | 42.3% | 30.2% | 0.3% | |
| February 2012 | Ipsos/Bimsa | 30% | 45% | 25% | 0.0% | |
| March 2012 | Uno TV/María de las Heras | 27.4% | 44.0% | 27.4% | 1.2% | |
| March 2012 | Grupo Impacto Inteligente 360º | 32.6% | 44.9% | 22.5% | – | PANAL's vote share not shown |
| March 2012 | Reforma | 32.0% | 45.0% | 22.0% | 1.0% | |
| April 2012 | Uno TV/María de las Heras | 30.6% | 38.9% | 29.2% | 1.3% | Carried out between 24 and 27 March |
| April 2012 | OEM-Parametría | 25% | 51% | 23% | 1.0% | |
| April 2012 | BGC-Excélsior | 29% | 50% | 20% | 1.0% | Carried out between 9 and 12 April |
| April 2012 | GEA/ISA-Milenio | 27.9% | 48.5% | 22.7% | 0.9% | |
| April 2012 | El Universal/Buendía & Laredo | 22.9% | 54.3% | 21.4% | 1.4% | |
| April 2012 | Consulta Mitofsky | 26.9% | 50.1% | 22.3% | 0.7% | |
| April 2012 | Covarrubias y Asociados | 22.0% | 42.0% | 24.0% | 1.0% | Published on 23 April |
| April 2012 | BGC-Excelsior | 28.0% | 47.0% | 23.0% | 2.0% | Carried out between 19 and 25 April |
| April 2012 | OEM-Parametría | 26.0% | 49.0% | 24.0% | 1.0% | Published on 30 April |
| May 2012 | GEA/ISA-Milenio | 26.1% | 51.2% | 21.1% | 1.6% | Published on 1 May |
| May 2012 | Consulta Mitofsky | 28.0% | 48.0% | 23.0% | 1.0% | Published on 1 May |
| May 2012 | El Sol de México/Parametría | 26.0% | 49.0% | 24.0% | 1% | One week before the candidates' debate |
| May 2012 | El Universal/Buendía & Laredo | 22.9% | 54.3% | 21.4% | 1.4% | Before the candidates' debate |
| May 2012 | GEA/ISA-Milenio | 27.6% | 49.1% | 21.9% | 1.4% | Before the candidates' debate |
| May 2012 | El Universal | 22.0% | 36.3% | 23.4% | 9.5% | After the candidates' debate |
| May 2012 | Uno TV/María de la Heras | 17.98% | 16.85% | 31.46% | 17.98% | After the candidates' debate |
| May 2012 | El Universal/Buendía & Laredo | 23.1% | 49.6% | 24.8% | 2.1% | |
| May 2012 | Covarrubias y Asociados | 26.0% | 40.0% | 30.0% | 4% | |
| May 2012 | Uno TV/María de las Heras | 26.0% | 39.0% | 31.0% | 4.0% | |
| June 2012 | Reforma | 23% | 38% | 34% | 5% | Gross preference draw between EPN and AMLO |
| June 2012 | Mitofsky | 20.8% | 35.8% | 24.0% | 1.6% | |
| June 2012 | Berumen y asociados | 20.7% | 30.9% | 31.8% | Not shown | Gross preference |
| June 2012 | BGC-Excelsior | 28% | 42% | 28% | 2% | |
| June 2012 | Berumen y asociados | 18% | 33.4% | 27.3% | 1.5% | Gross preference |
The share of the undefined vote has been excluded from these polls

== Allegations of media bias and Yo Soy 132 student protests ==
Mass protests have taken place in Mexico City against alleged bias towards PRI and Peña Nieto in the print and television media, particularly Televisa.

The movement Yo Soy 132 ("I am 132") formed in response to this perceived bias, with initial focus on Peña Nieto as the flagship of "corruption, tyranny and authoritarianism". On 11 May 2012, Peña Nieto visited Universidad Iberoamericana and was received with scorn. Both printed and televised media reported this as a minor mishap, called the students intolerant, and claimed that they had been paid by leftist organizations. In response, 131 students identified themselves on a YouTube video by their university IDs and stated that their actions were independent. This caused a ripple effect as many tweeted "I'm the 132nd student" in solidarity. Mass protests organized by public and private university students then took place across the country. The movement successfully demanded that, unlike the first debate, the second presidential debate be broadcast on national television, and has proposed a third debate to cover a broader scope of issues.

== Claims of hacking ==
In a 31 March 2016 article published by Bloomberg Business Week, a Colombian hacker named Andrés Sepúlveda claimed to have been paid US$600,000 by the PRI for hacking files (including phone calls, e-mails, and strategies) pertaining to the respective political campaigns of Peña Nieto's rivals, and also to manipulate social media to create fake news against his opponents with 30,000 fake Twitter accounts, creating fake trending topics and the perception of public enthusiasm toward Peña Nieto's campaign. On election day, Sepúlveda claimed to have been watching a live feed from Bogotá, Colombia and destroyed evidence right after Peña Nieto was declared winner. He said he was helped by a team of six hackers, which he led. The hacker is serving a 10-year prison sentence in Colombia for hacking crime, in favor of the election campaign of Óscar Iván Zuluaga.

== Results ==
=== President ===
| Candidate | Party or alliance | | Votes | % |
|---|---|---|---|---|
| Enrique Peña Nieto | Commitment to Mexico | Institutional Revolutionary Party | 16,354,938 | 33.44 |
| Enrique Peña Nieto | Commitment to Mexico | Ecologist Green Party of Mexico | 2,803,654 | 5.73 |
| Enrique Peña Nieto | Commitment to Mexico | Total | 19,158,592 | 39.17 |
| Andrés Manuel López Obrador | Progressive Movement | Party of the Democratic Revolution | 11,122,251 | 22.74 |
| Andrés Manuel López Obrador | Progressive Movement | Labor Party | 2,597,905 | 5.31 |
| Andrés Manuel López Obrador | Progressive Movement | Citizens' Movement | 2,128,671 | 4.35 |
| Andrés Manuel López Obrador | Progressive Movement | Total | 15,848,827 | 32.41 |
| Josefina Vázquez Mota | National Action Party | | 12,732,630 | 26.03 |
| Gabriel Quadri de la Torre | New Alliance Party | | 1,146,085 | 2.34 |
| Non-registered candidates | | | 20,625 | 0.04 |
| Total | | | 48,906,759 | 100.00 |
| Valid votes | | | 48,906,759 | 97.53 |
| Invalid/blank votes | | | 1,236,857 | 2.47 |
| Total votes | | | 50,143,616 | 100.00 |
| Registered voters/turnout | | | 79,492,286 | 63.08 |
Source: DOF

=== Senate ===
| Party | Party-list | | | Constituency | | | Total seats | +/– |
| Party | Votes | % | Seats | Votes | % | Seats | Total seats | +/– |
|---|---|---|---|---|---|---|---|---|
| Institutional Revolutionary Party | 15,673,351 | 33.00 | 11 | 15,600,165 | 32.94 | 41 | 52 | +19 |
| National Action Party | 13,237,212 | 27.87 | 9 | 13,120,533 | 27.71 | 29 | 38 | –14 |
| Party of the Democratic Revolution | 9,351,005 | 19.69 | 6 | 9,265,578 | 19.57 | 16 | 22 | –4 |
| Ecologist Green Party of Mexico | 2,880,080 | 6.06 | 2 | 2,869,843 | 6.06 | 7 | 9 | +3 |
| Labor Party | 2,336,826 | 4.92 | 2 | 2,325,913 | 4.91 | 2 | 4 | 0 |
| Citizens' Movement | 2,024,528 | 4.26 | 1 | 2,013,180 | 4.25 | 1 | 2 | –4 |
| New Alliance Party | 1,854,678 | 3.91 | 1 | 2,031,486 | 4.29 | 0 | 1 | 0 |
| Non-registered candidates | 131,067 | 0.28 | 0 | 130,612 | 0.28 | 0 | 0 | 0 |
| Total | 47,488,747 | 100.00 | 32 | 47,357,310 | 100.00 | 96 | 128 | 0 |
| Valid votes | 47,488,747 | 94.44 | | 47,357,310 | 94.50 | | | |
| Invalid/blank votes | 2,797,881 | 5.56 | | 2,755,674 | 5.50 | | | |
| Total votes | 50,286,628 | 100.00 | | 50,112,984 | 100.00 | | | |
| Registered voters/turnout | 79,433,171 | 63.31 | | 79,433,171 | 63.09 | | | |
Source: Election Resources

=== Chamber of Deputies ===
| Party | Party-list | | | Constituency | | | Total seats | +/– |
| Party | Votes | % | Seats | Votes | % | Seats | Total seats | +/– |
|---|---|---|---|---|---|---|---|---|
| Institutional Revolutionary Party | 15,960,086 | 33.57 | 49 | 15,892,978 | 33.63 | 158 | 207 | –30 |
| National Action Party | 12,960,875 | 27.26 | 62 | 12,885,414 | 27.27 | 52 | 114 | –29 |
| Party of the Democratic Revolution | 9,194,637 | 19.34 | 44 | 9,135,149 | 19.33 | 56 | 100 | +29 |
| Ecologist Green Party of Mexico | 3,054,718 | 6.42 | 15 | 3,045,385 | 6.44 | 19 | 34 | +13 |
| Labor Party | 2,294,459 | 4.83 | 11 | 2,286,892 | 4.84 | 8 | 19 | +6 |
| New Alliance Party | 2,041,608 | 4.29 | 10 | 1,977,185 | 4.18 | 0 | 10 | +1 |
| Citizens' Movement | 2,000,524 | 4.21 | 9 | 1,992,102 | 4.22 | 7 | 16 | +10 |
| Non-registered candidates | 41,556 | 0.09 | 0 | 41,120 | 0.09 | 0 | 0 | 0 |
| Total | 47,548,463 | 100.00 | 200 | 47,256,225 | 100.00 | 300 | 500 | 0 |
| Valid votes | 47,548,463 | 95.02 | | 47,256,225 | 95.04 | | | |
| Invalid/blank votes | 2,494,400 | 4.98 | | 2,465,407 | 4.96 | | | |
| Total votes | 50,042,863 | 100.00 | | 49,721,632 | 100.00 | | | |
| Registered voters/turnout | 79,433,171 | 63.00 | | 79,433,171 | 62.60 | | | |
Source: Election Resources

=== Recount ===
Following the elections, López Obrador demanded a full recount, claiming there had been widespread irregularities. The Federal Electoral Institute subsequently announced that there would be a partial recount, with presidential ballots from 78,012 of the 143,132 polling stations to be recounted, whilst ballots for the Congressional elections would be re-examined at two-thirds of polling stations. On 6 July after a partial recount of approximately 50% of the votes, the Federal Electoral Institute declared they had found anomalies but that Nieto still had majority and was confirmed as the winner with 38.2% of the popular vote. which officially has until 6 September to announce a winner.

=== Request to invalidate election ===
On 12 July, López Obrador presented his formal complaint to invalidate the election to the Electoral Tribunal of the Federal Judiciary (TEPJF) on grounds of violation of constitutional article 41 which states that the elections must be free and authentic and with equal benefits for all competing parties. Alleging that the Mexican media had treated them with inequality in relation to Peña Nieto and presenting the numerous evidence of paraphernalia used to buy votes for the PRI as well as pre-marked ballots and notarized witness statements of people who sold their votes to the PRI. The complaint also pointed towards the PRI's campaign going over budget an alleged 1000% over the established allowed budget by the Federal Electoral Institute which is of 336 million Mexican pesos. On July 18 López Obrador accused Peña Nieto of using illicit funds and money laundering to finance his campaign. After presenting new audio evidence regarding the PRI's use of Monex cards, López Obrador commented that it would be better if the Electoral Tribunal invalidated the election and move in an interim President than to violate the constitution and acting in an "anti-democratic" way. He said that if the Electoral Tribunal does not invalidate the election, Mexico will be governed by a "gang of evildoers".

On 30 August 2012, the TEPJF, Mexico's highest election-law court rejected the allegations of fraud after they concluded that there was "insufficient evidence of wrongdoing."

== Post-electoral protests and claims of fraud ==
After the preliminary results of the Federal Electoral Institute announced Enrique Peña Nieto as virtual President-elect, several student protests led by the youth movement Yo Soy 132 and independent citizen movements broke out throughout the country claiming the forced imposition of a President and electoral fraud, as evidence of an alleged fraud surfaced and pointed towards the PRI buying votes by providing voting citizens with store credit cards of Mexican supermarket chain Soriana. Mexico's Federal Electoral Institute (IFE) confirmed in January 2013 that Peña Nieto's party spent $5.2 million in electronic cards throughout the whole campaign. Opposition parties complained that this represented a form of illicit funding, but the IFE claimed the contrary. The PRI party claimed that the electronic cards were intended for party personnel, but this method rose suspicions because some of the money was transacted through "several shadowy companies instead of being disbursed directly from party coffers." This also increased the suspicions that the PRI had received illegal donations from corporations (given that this move is prohibited under law). The IFE stated on 24 January 2013 and ruled by 5–4 votes that the fundings were not violating the law, but opposition parties and critics believe that the IFE did not thoroughly investigate the origins of the money.

Further alleged evidence arose as pictures of ballots already marked in favor of the PRI, with the logo of the party printed over the marking, have been shared widely over online social networks, and there have also been numerous videos and photos of that show the irregularities between local ballot boxes and the official result of those ballot boxes. More allegations appeared as videos showing protection of local police patrols protecting supposed "Mapaches". Following a request from Andrés Manuel López Obrador, the Federal Electoral Institute agreed to recount more than half of the ballots cast in the presidential election. It later reconfirmed the original result. The result was endorsed by Barack Obama, the president of the United States, and by the Venezuelan president Hugo Chávez, who backed López Obrador in a similar dispute in 2006.

On 7 July, a national protest in opposition of Enrique Peña Nieto was organized through online social networks, and demonstrations occurred in several cities. The protest in Mexico City was billed as a "mega-march", but the number of demonstrators equalled only around half the number which attended anti-PRI demonstrations held prior to the election. Statements from the Yo Soy 132 student movement formally uninvolved themselves from the protest cautioning against violent results; alleging that it may have been organized by a similarly named movement linked to the PRI. Despite the statement the protests effectively took place in 37 cities in Mexico, Canada, the United States, and Europe with no incidents of violence or known involvement of the PRI. Though in Xalapa, Veracruz a man identified as Juan Pablo Frianzoni, presumed member of the youth PRI group "Juventud Dinamica"; threw chairs at the protesters and then pointed a handgun at them from his balcony. Frianzoni was then apprehended by Police officers who were standing by the protest. Televisa did not broadcast the National protests, and instead presented a live broadcast of Eugenio Derbez and Alessandra Rosaldo's wedding which was interrupted due to "technical difficulties" when loud protest chants became audible outside of the event. Derbez however stated that he was in support of the protests, and though he regrets them happening on the day of his wedding; he said he will cherish the memory.

As of 15 July protests and further acts of civil resistance against Peña Nieto and Televisa continue around the country. On 27 July protesters set up a 24-hour blockade around the main Televisa studios in Chapultepec, Mexico City. On August 30 several protesters gathered outside the offices of the Electoral Tribunal of the Federal Judiciary as the Magistrates declared that the claims made by the left-wing coalition were "unfounded" and were therefore rejected.

On 1 December 2012, as Peña Nieto was being sworn in as President, protesters rioted outside of the national palace and clashed with Federal Police forces, in an event that has been labeled by the media as the 1DMX, while vandalizing hotel structures and setting fires around Mexico City. More than 90 protesters were arrested and several were injured. Mexico City Mayor Marcelo Ebrard blamed anarchist groups for causing the violent outcomes.

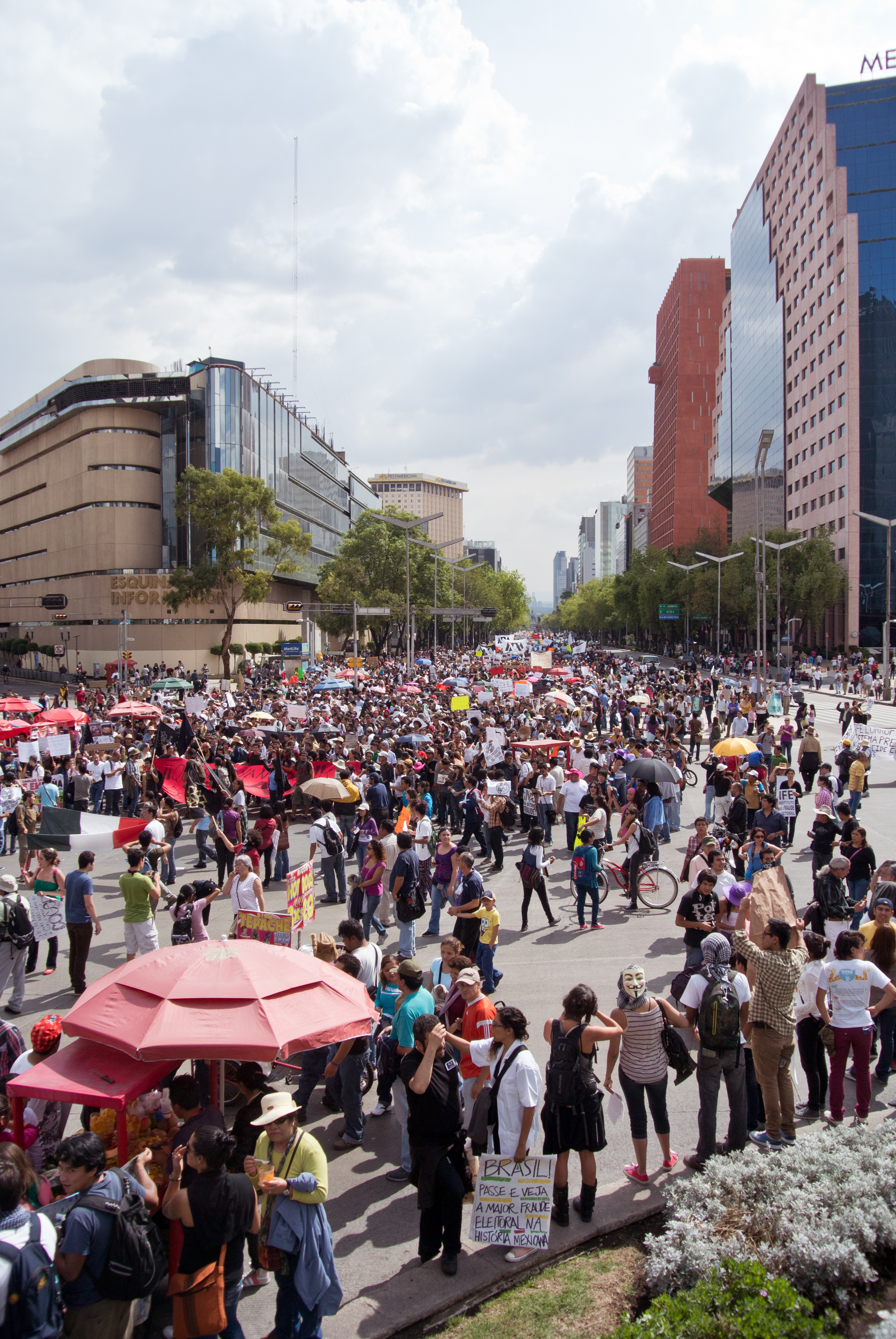
Anti-Imposition Protest in Mexico City.

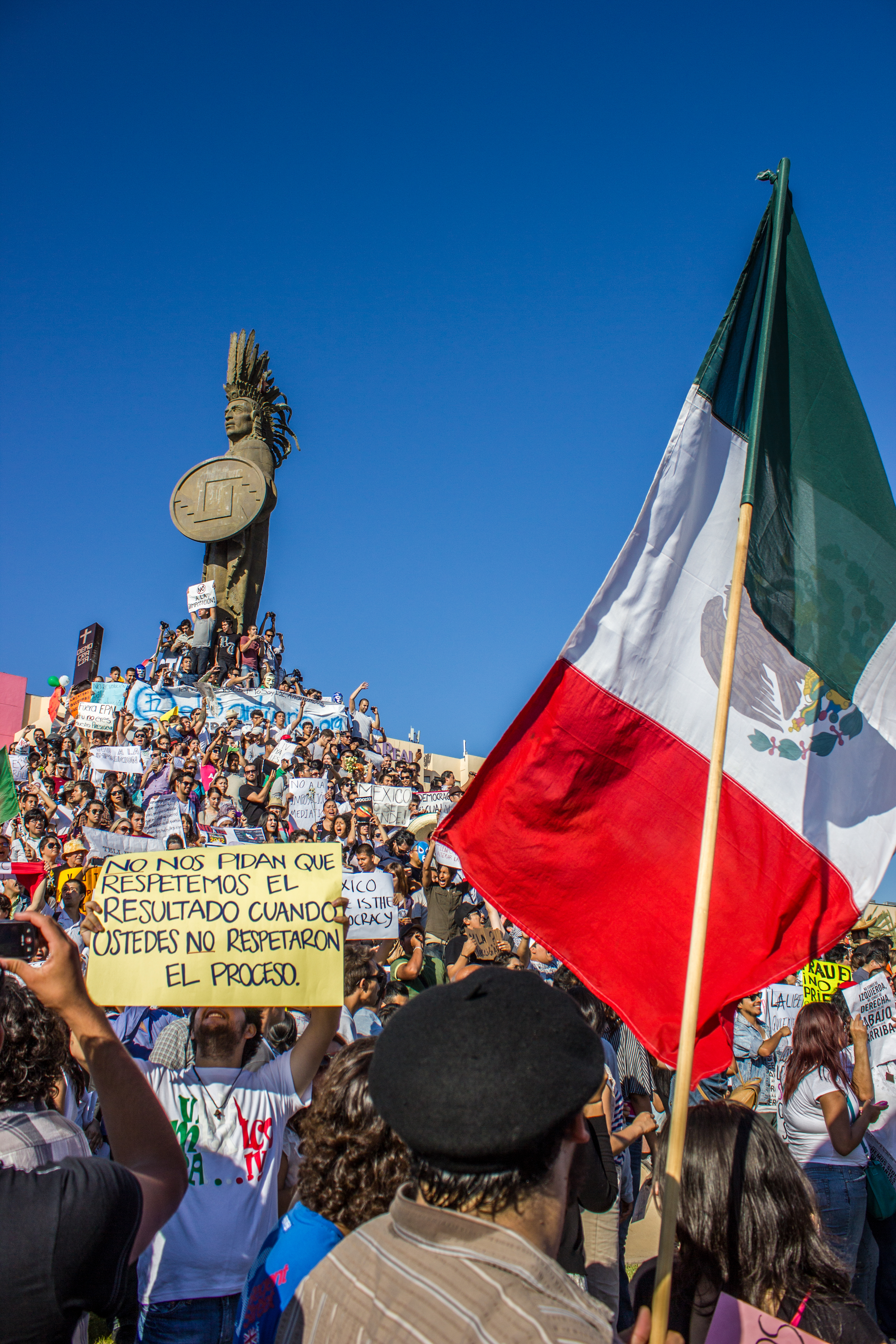
Anti-Imposition Protest in Tijuana, Baja California.
