= Miguel Ángel López Velasco =

Mexican crime journalist and murder victim

- Born: 1956
- Died: 20 June 2011 (aged 54–55); Veracruz
- Other name: Milo Vera
- Occupation: Journalist
- Employer: Notiver
- Known for: Column

Miguel Ángel López Velasco (1956 – 20 June 2011), also known by his pen name Milo Vera, was a veteran Mexican journalist for the Notiver newspaper in Veracruz, Mexico, where he wrote a column about crime, law, and security in his locality. He and his wife and son were killed in a drug war related attack for his journalism. Miseal López Solana, who was both the son and journalist colleague of Milo Vera at Notiver, also died in the same attack.

Three journalists from Notiver were killed within a month's time. Veracruz's state governor Javier Duarte de Ochoa promised to investigate Lopez's murder and the murder of 3 other journalists found dead in Veracruz in 2011. The Committee to Protect Journalists said journalists were leaving Veracruz or in hiding after the two Lópezes and Yolanda Ordaz de la Cruz, also of Notiver, were killed, which left the newspaper unable to report on crime and security issues.

== Personal ==
Miguel Ángel López Velasco, 55, also known by his pen name Milo Vera, was a journalist for the Notiver who was gunned down in his home in Veracruz with his wife and a son. His son Miseal López Solana, in his early twenties, also worked for Notiver. Beginning in the 1990s, the elder López was known as an outspoken columnist who worked on investigative stories about drug trafficking and security matters. the younger López was a photojournalist who focused on police and crime-related stories, and he accompanied his father while reporting. López was survived by at least one son, Miguel Ángel López Solana, who also worked for Notiver, and Reporters Without Borders documented his detention in which he was beaten by federal police in February 2008. The United States granted his son Miguel political asylum in June 2013 with the assistance of the Committee to Protect Journalists.

== Career ==
López was the deputy editor and also wrote for a column called “Va de Nuez” which involved the topics of kidnappings, corruption, crime, and abuse of authority in the Veracruz area. He worked with Yolanda Ordaz de la Cruz at Notiver. Lopez had been writing for the Notiver for over 20 years before he was found dead on June 20, along with his wife and son in their home.

== Death ==
López and his colleagues worked for Notiver in Veracruz, Veracruz.

In 2007, Milo Vera received a threat from local drug traffickers, which said, "We are leaving you a present here (...) Heads are going to roll. Milovela knows it and many others know it too. These heads are for my dad. Yours truly, A son of Mario Sánchez and the New People." Not only did the threat include a human head next to the letter sitting on the front step of the Notiver, but they also misspelled Milo Vera. López said he was not concerned about the threat.

On the morning of June 20, 2011, multiple gunmen broke into López's house where they found and shot López around 6 a.m. along with his wife, Agustina Solano, and son, Miseal López Solana. Miguel Ángel López Velasco worked for 20 years at the daily Notiver, a newspaper covering safety matters and drug trafficking. The Notiver has the largest newspaper circulation in this part of Mexico.

Juan Carlos Carranza Saavedra was identified as a suspect after Lopez published an article on drug trade in the Veracruz area. Some at the Notiver believed their murder may have been in retaliation to a recent column López wrote on the drug trade in the Veracruz area.

== Impact ==
Earlier in the year in Veracruz, Noel López Olguín, La Verdad de Jáltipan, was killed.

After López, Yolanda Ordaz de la Cruz at Notiver was investigating her friend and colleague's murder when she was killed about a month later, and a note was left by her body that linked her decapitation with the father and son murders. Her death brought to four the journalists killed in Veracruz.

Attacks against journalists in the Mexican drug war have been increasing. Veracruz’s governor Javier Duarte de Ochoa pledged that the law would come down on anyone who was linked to Miguel Ángel López Velasco’s murder, as well as all the other murders of journalists in the area. In 2011, 5 journalists were murdered in Mexico and 3 journalists worked for the Notiver. Veracruz is one of the nation’s largest ports and one part of Veracruz is a key corridor for drug trafficking of undocumented aliens and narcotics.

The CPJ reported that after Ordaz had been decapitated, five journalists left Notiver, which left the newspaper unable to cover such issues as crime and security.

== Reactions ==
Irina Bokova, who is the director-general of UNESCO, condemns the murders of López and his family and says that they are trying to stop the violence of the criminals who believe in “silencing the media” on their own terms. Three days following the murder, Veracruz’s state attorney announces that Juan Carlos Carranza Saavedra or “El Ñaca” is the mastermind behind López’s death. No motive was found for why El Ñaca wanted López and his family dead. Further investigation was necessary but nothing was uncovered.

A colleague of López and murdered journalist Regina Martinez sought exile in France after intimidation and threats.

== See also ==
- Mexican drug war
- List of journalists killed in Mexico
