= New Alliance Party (Mexico) =

New Alliance Party Partido Nueva Alianza
- Leader: Luis Castro Obregón
- Founder: Elba Esther Gordillo
- Founded: 14 July 2005
- Dissolved: 3 September 2018 (at national level)
- Split from: Institutional Revolutionary Party
- Headquarters: Durango núm. 199, Col. Roma, Deleg. Cuauhtémoc, Mexico City
- Youth wing: Alianza Joven
- Ideology: Liberalism
- Political position: Centre to centre-right
- National affiliation: Juntos Hacemos Historia
- International affiliation: Liberal International
- Continental affiliation: Liberal Network for Latin America
- Colours: Turquoise
- Seats in the Chamber of Deputies: 0 / 500
- Seats in the Senate: 0 / 128
- Governorships: 0 / 32
- Mayors: 48 / 2,052
- Seats in state legislatures: 18 / 1,123

Website
- www.nueva-alianza.org.mx

The New Alliance Party (Spanish: Partido Nueva Alianza, PNA or PANAL) is a state-level (previously national, until 2018) political party in Mexico founded in 2005.

Its creation was proposed by the Sindicato Nacional de Trabajadores de la Educación (SNTE, National Union of Education Workers), the largest trade union in Latin America, led by Elba Esther Gordillo, the controversial former general secretary of the Institutional Revolutionary Party (PRI).

== History ==
Areas where PANAL remains registered as a political party at the state level (as of 2020)

The New Alliance Party achieved its official register on July 14, 2005, three years after the SNTE created the Asociación Ciudadana del Magisterio (ACM, Citizen Association of Teachers), a political group recognized by the Federal Electoral Institute since August 2002. The creation of this party by the SNTE, a group that had traditionally supported the PRI in every election, caused accusations of treason for Gordillo.

The party's president is Jorge Kahwagi. On 8 January 2006, the PNA elected Roberto Campa as its candidate for president in the 2006 general elections. In the 2006 legislative elections the party won nine out of 500 seats in the Chamber of Deputies and one out of 128 Senators. In the 2009 legislative elections the party lost one seat in the Chamber of Deputies, leaving it with eight seats. In the 2012 legislative elections, PANAL won 2 seats in the Senate (an overall loss of 3), and 10 seats in the Chamber of Deputies (an overall gain of 3).

The party logo distinctly resembles that of the now-defunct Canadian Alliance, a conservative party active from 2000 to 2003. The logo was provided by an ad agency, purported to resemble a dove. Despite the discovery of the logo's resemblance to that of the Canadian Alliance (leading one founding member of the party to express feeling "robbed"), it was nonetheless adopted. The party's 2012 presidential candidate, Gabriel Quadri, appeared in a wetsuit at his campaign launch, as did Canadian Alliance leader Stockwell Day.

In 2018, the party entered into coalition with the PRI and Green Party (PVEM) to support the nomination of José Antonio Meade. Meade finished a distant third behind Andrés Manuel López Obrador, but the results for New Alliance were worse. The party failed to attract three percent of the vote in all three elections for president, proportional representation federal deputies, and senators, which under Mexican law prompts the loss of its federal registry and the appointment of a liquidator by the INE to dispose of the party's assets. Nueva Alianza and the Social Encounter Party, the other party to lose its registry after the 2018 elections, challenged the result, to no avail. The PNA was officially dissolved at the national level on 3 September 2018, although it is still officially registered as a party in several individual states, and operates as a political organization in the others.

== Electoral history ==
=== Presidential elections ===
Election year	Candidate	# votes	% vote	Result	Note
2006	Roberto Campa Cifrián	401,804	0.96	✗ Defeated	
2012	Gabriel Quadri de la Torre	1,146,085	2.34	✗ Defeated	
2018	José Antonio Meade Kuribreña	561,193	0.99	✗ Defeated	

=== Congressional elections ===
==== Chamber of Deputies ====
Election year	Constituency		PR		# of seats	Position	Presidency	Note
Election year	votes	%	votes	%	# of seats	Position	Presidency	Note
2006	3,637,685	14.1	3,637,685	14.0	9 / 500	Minority	Felipe Calderón	
2009	1,181,850	3.4	1,186,876	3.4	8 / 500	Minority	Felipe Calderón	
2012	1,977,185	4.29	1,986,538	4.08	10 / 500	Minority	Enrique Peña Nieto	
2015	1,480,090	3.91	1,486,935	3.72	10 / 500	Minority	Enrique Peña Nieto	
2018	1,391,376	2.47			2 / 500	Minority	Andrés Manuel López Obrador	

==== Senate elections ====
Election year	Constituency		PR		# of seats	Position	Presidency	Note
Election year	votes	%	votes	%	# of seats	Position	Presidency	Note
2006	1,677,033	4.1	1,688,198	4.0	1 / 128	Minority	Felipe Calderón	
2012	1,796,816	3.9	1,855,403	3.9	1 / 128	Minority	Enrique Peña Nieto	
2018	1,307,015	2.31			1 / 128	Minority	Andrés Manuel López Obrador	
