= 2011 in Mexico =

- Decades: 1990s; 2000s; 2010s; 2020s
- See also: History of Mexico; List of years in Mexico; Timeline of Mexican history

This is a list of events that happened in 2011 in Mexico. The article also lists the most important political leaders during the year at both federal and state levels.

== Incumbents ==
=== Federal government ===
- President: Felipe Calderón PAN
- Interior Secretary (SEGOB)
  - Francisco Blake Mora, until November 11 (died in office)
  - Alejandro Poiré Romero, starting November 17
- Secretary of Foreign Affairs (SRE): Patricia Espinosa
- Communications Secretary (SCT)
  - Juan Molinar Horcasitas, until January 7
  - Dionisio Pérez-Jácome Friscione, starting January 7
- Education Secretary (SEP): Alonso Lujambio
- Secretary of Defense (SEDENA): Guillermo Galván Galván
- Secretary of Navy (SEMAR): Mariano Francisco Saynez Mendoza
- Secretary of Labor and Social Welfare (STPS)
  - Javier Lozano Alarcón, until December 14
  - Rosalinda Vélez Juárez, starting December 14
- Secretary of Welfare (SEDESOL): Heriberto Félix Guerra
- Secretary of Public Education (SEP):
- Tourism Secretary (SECTUR):
- Secretary of the Environment (SEMARNAT): Juan Rafael Elvira Quesada
- Secretary of Health (SALUD)
  - José Ángel Córdova, until September 9
  - Salomón Chertorivski Woldenberg, starting September 9
- Secretary of Energy (SENER)
  - José Antonio Meade, until September 9
  - Jordy Herrera Flores, starting September 9
- Secretary of Finance and Public Credit (SHCP)
  - Ernesto Cordero Arroyo, until September 9
  - José Antonio Meade, starting September 9
- Secretary of Economy (SE): Bruno Ferrari García de Alba
- Secretariat of Public Security (SSP): Genaro García Luna

=== Governors ===
- Aguascalientes: Carlos Lozano de la Torre PRI
- Baja California: José Guadalupe Osuna Millán PAN
- Baja California Sur
  - Narciso Agúndez Montaño PRD, until April 5.
  - Marcos Covarrubias Villaseñor PAN, starting April 5.
- Campeche: Fernando Ortega Bernés PRI
- Chiapas: Juan Sabines Guerrero, (Coalition for the Good of All)
- Chihuahua: César Duarte Jáquez PRI
- Coahuila
  - Humberto Moreira PRI, until January 4
  - Jorge Torres López PRI, January 4–November 30
  - Rubén Moreira PRI, starting December 1
- Colima: Mario Anguiano Moreno PRI
- Durango: Jorge Herrera Caldera PRI
- Guanajuato: Juan Manuel Oliva PAN
- Guerrero
  - Zeferino Torreblanca PRD, until March 31
  - Ángel Aguirre Rivero PRD, starting April 1
- Hidalgo
  - Miguel Ángel Osorio Chong PRI
  - Francisco Olvera Ruiz PRI
- Jalisco: Emilio González Márquez PAN
- State of Mexico
  - Enrique Peña Nieto PRI, until September 16
  - Eruviel Ávila Villegas PRI, starting September 16
- Michoacán: Leonel Godoy Rangel PRD
- Morelos: Marco Antonio Adame PAN.
- Nayarit: Ney González Sánchez
- Nuevo León: Rodrigo Medina de la Cruz PRI
- Oaxaca: Gabino Cué Monteagudo, Convergence
- Puebla
  - Mario Plutarco Marín Torres PRI, until January 31
  - Rafael Moreno Valle Rosas PAN, starting February 1
- Querétaro: José Calzada PRI
- Quintana Roo
  - Félix González Canto PRI, until April 4
  - Roberto Borge Angulo PRI, starting April 5
- San Luis Potosí: Fernando Toranzo Fernández PRI
- Sinaloa: Mario López Valdez, starting January 1
- Sonora: Guillermo Padrés Elías PAN
- Tabasco: Andrés Granier Melo PRI
- Tamaulipas: Egidio Torre Cantú PRI, starting January 1
- Tlaxcala
  - Héctor Ortiz Ortiz PAN, untl January 14
  - Mariano González Zarur PRI, starting January 15
- Veracruz: Javier Duarte de Ochoa PRI
- Yucatán: Ivonne Ortega Pacheco PRI
- Zacatecas: Amalia García PRD
- Head of Government of the Federal District: Marcelo Ebrard (PRD)

== Events ==
=== January–March ===
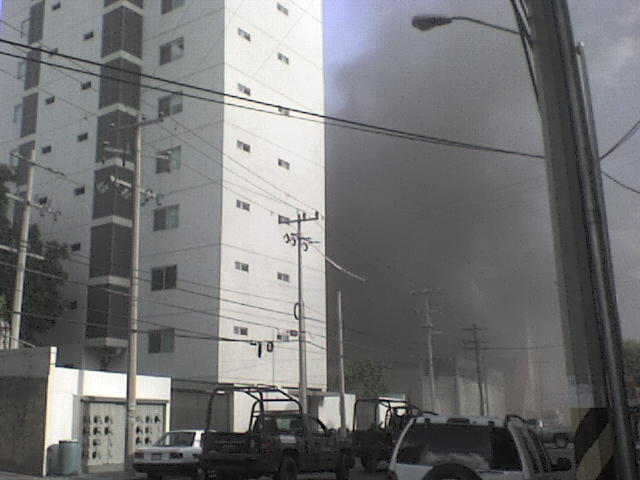
August 25 – 2011 Monterrey casino attack: Casino Royale in fire, after the attack

January

- January 6 – the poet and women's rights activist Susana Chávez is murdered in Ciudad Juarez.
- January 14 – Mexican drug war: 14 people are killed in a shootout after 100 soldiers, marines and police in Xalapa, Veracruz, surround a house.
- January 25 – Gunmen open fire on a crowd at a soccer game in Ciudad Juarez, Mexico, killing seven people.
- January 30 – State elections in Guerrero.

February

- February 6 – State elections in Baja California Sur.
- February 8 – The Mexican Army rescues 44 Guatemalan immigrants in Reynosa in northern Mexico.
- February 13 – Unidentified gunmen kill eight people in Ciudad Nezahualcóyotl part of the Mexico City Metropolitan Area.
- February 15 – Two U.S. Immigration and Customs Enforcement officers are shot while travelling between Monterrey and Mexico City with one officer dying.
- February 20 – Mexican drug war: 53 people are killed in a 72-hour period in Ciudad Juarez, Mexico.

March

- March 1 – Seventeen bodies are found in clandestine graves in Mexico's Guerrero state.

=== April–June ===
April

- April 6 – 2011 Tamaulipas massacre: At least 177 bodies are found in a mass grave in Mexico's Tamaulipas state.

May

- May 8 – Bicentennial celebrations in Monterrey.

June

- June 7 – The former Governor of Chiapas state in Mexico Pablo Salazar is arrested on charges on embezzling more than $90 million from hurricane relief funds.

=== July–September ===
July

- July 3
  - State elections in the State of Mexico.
  - State elections in Nayarit.
  - Voters in Mexico go to the polls for local elections in the states of Mexico, Coahuila, Nayarit, Puebla and Hidalgo.

August

- August 8 – Monterrey Tech bombing: A homemade bomb explodes at Monterrey Institute of Technology and Higher Education, Estado de México Campus in Atizapán de Zaragoza. The bomb was sent to a professor of robotics who was injured along with a guard at the university.
- August 25 – 2011 Monterrey casino attack: more than 50 people are killed in an attack on a casino in Monterrey, Nuevo León, Mexico.
- August 30 – The Popocatepetl volcano south of Mexico City starts spewing ash into the sky.

September

=== October–December ===
October
November

- November 13 – State elections in Michoacán.

December

== Awards ==
- Belisario Domínguez Medal of Honor – Cuauhtémoc Cárdenas Solorzano
- Order of the Aztec Eagle
- National Prize for Arts and Sciences
- National Public Administration Prize
- Ohtli Award
  - Alexander Gonzalez
  - Charlie Gonzalez
  - Carlos Gutierrez
  - Salud Carbajal
  - Francisco G. Cigarroa
  - Paddy Moloney
  - Mel Martínez
  - David J. Schmidly
  - Richard A. Tapia
  - Alfredo Quiñones-Hinojosa
  - Edward James Olmos

== Notable deaths ==
=== January to June ===
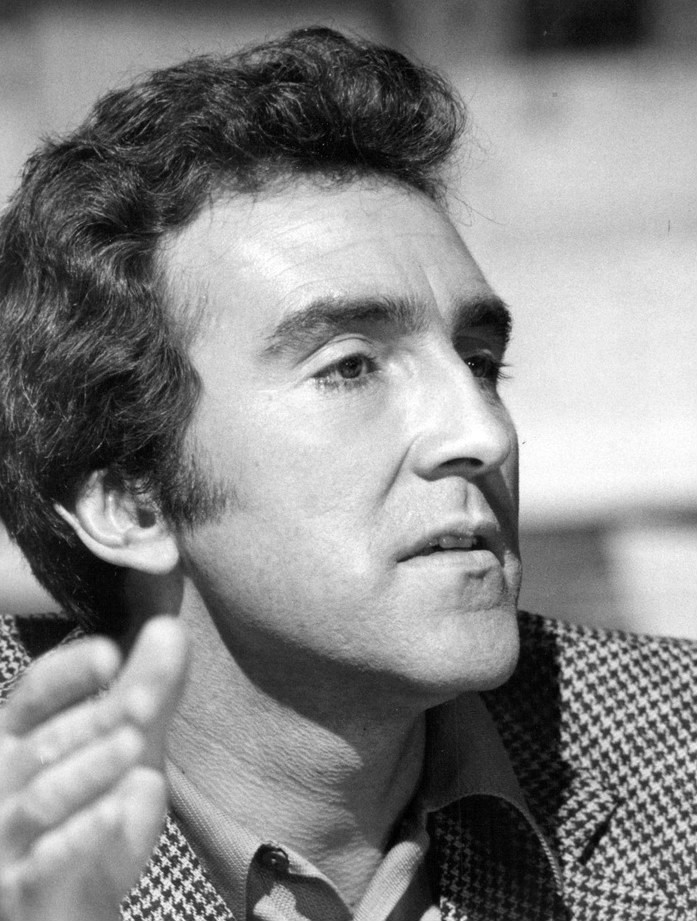
Pedro Armendáriz, Jr.

- January 5 – Saúl Vara Rivera, politician PRI, Mayor of Zaragoza, Coahuila; shot. (body found on this date)
- January 11
  - Abraham Ortíz Rosales, politician PVEM, Mayor of Temoac, Morelos; shot.
  - Susana Chávez, poet and human rights activist, strangled. (death confirmed on this date)
- January 13 – Luis Jiménez Mata, politician, Mayor of Santiago Amoltepec; shot.
- February 4 – Juan Carlos Guardado Méndez, politician PT, former municipal president of Fresnillo, Zacatecas; murdered. (Note: Guardado Méndez was abducted on 4 February 2011 and is currently disappeared. He is not reported as dead.)
- February 9 – Rodolfo Ochoa Moreno, journalist (Grupo Multimedios Laguna), Torreón, Coahuila; killed.
- February 12 – Saturnino Valdez Llanos, politician ||PRI, municipal president of Tampico Alto, Veracruz; murdered. (Note: Valdez Llanos was intercepted by gunmen and has not been found. He is not reported as dead.)
- February 13 — Manuel Esperón, composer (d. 2011)
- February 22 – José Luis Prieto Torres, politician, former president of Allende Municipality, Chihuahua; murdered.
- February 28 – Enrique Chávez Gómez, politician PRD, former candidate for municipal president of Saucillo, Chihuahua; murdered.
- March 10 – Mario Chuc Aguilar, politician, former municipal president of Felipe Carrillo Puerto, Quintana Roo; murdered.
- March 25 – José Luis Cerda Meléndez & Luis Emanuel Ruiz Carrillo, journalists (La Prensa), Guadalupe, Nuevo León; killed.
- April 7 – Enterbio Reyes Bello, politician, former president of Copanatoyac (municipality), Guerrero; murdered.
- May 14 – Silvia Moreno Leal, politician, former president of Balleza Municipality, Chihuahua; murdered.
- May 18 – Fernando Duarte Flores, politician, former municipal president of Hidalgo, Coahuila; murdered.
- May 31 – Noel López Olguín, journalist (La Verdad de Jáltipan), Chinameca, Veracruz; killed.
- June 7 – Gonzalo Amador Ortega, politician PAN, former candidate for municipal president of Huauchinango, Puebla; murdered.
- June 14 – Pablo Ruelas Barraza, journalist (Diario del Yaqui & El Regional de Sonora), Huatabampo, Sonora; killed.
- June 20 – Miguel Ángel López Velasco, journalist (Notiver), Veracruz; killed.
- June 24 – Gonzalo Amador Ortega, politician PAN, former candidate for municipal president of Huauchinango, Puebla; murdered.

=== July to December ===
- July 3 – Ángel Castillo Corona, journalist (Puntual and Diario de México), Ocuilan State of Mexico; killed.
- July 21 – Ernesto Cornejo Valenzuela, politician PAN, former candidate for deputy; state delegate for the PAN in Benito Juárez Municipality, Sonora; murdered.
- July 26 – Yolanda Ordaz de la Cruz, journalist (Notiver), Veracruz, Veracruz; killed.
- July 28 – Fortino Cortés Sandoval, politician, municipal president of Florencia de Benito Juárez, Zacatecas; murdered.
- August 20 – José Eduviges Nava Altamirano, politician PT, municipal president of Zacualpan, State of Mexico; murdered.
- August 24 – Luz María García Villagrán, politician, president of Gran Morelos Municipality, Chihuahua; murdered.||
- September 1
  - Ana María Marcela Yarce Viveros, journalist (Contralínea), Iztapalapa, Mexico City; killed.
  - Rocío González Trápaga, journalist (Televisa Mexico City), Iztapalapa, Mexico City; killed.
- September 15 – Gustavo Pacheco Villaseñor, politician PRI, former municipal president of San Juan Bautista Tuxtepec, Oaxaca; murdered.
- September 17 – Moisés Villanueva de la Luz, politician PRI, Deputy from Tlapa de Comonfort (municipality), Guerrero; murdered.
- September 24 – María Elizabeth Macías Castro, journalist (Primera Hora), Nuevo Laredo, Tamaulipas; killed.
- August 25 – Humberto Millán Salazar, journalist (A Discusión and Radio Fórmula Culiacán), Culiacán, Sinaloa; killed.
- October 8 — José de las Fuentes Rodríguez, lawyer and politician PRI; Governor of Coahuila 1981–1987 (b. 1920)
- November 2 – Ricardo Guzmán Romero, politician PAN, municipal president of La Piedad, Michoacán; murdered.
- November 19 – Roberto Miguel Galván, politician, former municipal president of Tepetzintla, Veracruz; murdered. (Note: Cartel members broke into Galván's house and kidnapped him. He remains disappeared.)
- December 3 – Hugo César Muruato Flores, journalist (La Caliente 90.9), Chihuahua, Chihuahua; killed.
- December 12 – Fortunato Ruiz Blázquez, politician, former municipal president of Ixhuacán, Veracruz; murdered.
- December 21 – José Martínez Mendoza, politician, former municipal president of Cosalá, Sinaloa; murdered.
- December 24 – José Andrés Corral Arredondo, 65, Roman Catholic prelate, Bishop of Parral (1992-2011); heart attack.
- December 26 – Pedro Armendáriz, Jr., 71, actor (Zorro series); cancer, died in New York City, United States.
- December 31 – Porfirio Flores Ayala, politician PRI||former president of Cuernavaca Municipality, Morelos; murdered.

== See also ==
- 2011 Mexican fire season
- List of Mexican films of 2011
