= Cisneros (surname) =

- Coat of Arms
- Language: Spanish

Origin
- Origin: Cisneros
- Region of origin: Palencia, Spain

Other names
- Variant forms: Cisnero; Cisneroz; Cisnerros; Cisnerosa; Sisneros; Zisneros

Cisneros is a Spanish surname. Notable people with the surname include:

- Adriana Cisneros (born 1979), Venezuelan journalist and the CEO and Vice Chairman of Cisneros Group
- Al Cisneros (born 1973), American stoner metal musician
- Antonio Cisneros (1942–2012), Peruvian poet
- Baltasar Hidalgo de Cisneros (1758–1829), Viceroy of the Rio de La Plata
- Carlos Cisneros (1948–2019), American politician
- Carlos Cisneros (1962-present), Argentine politician
- Carmen Cisneros, Mexican physicist
- Diego Cisneros (1911–1980), Venezuelan businessman
- Countess Eleonora de Cisneros (1878–1934), American opera singer and educator
- Ernesto Cisneros (born 1940), Mexican footballer
- Evelyn Cisneros (born 1958), American ballet dancer
- Francesc Antoni de la Dueña y Cisneros (1753–1821), Spanish Bishop of Urgell
- Francisco Jiménez de Cisneros (1436–1517), Spanish cardinal and statesman; grand inquisitor
- Gabriel Cisneros (1940–2007), Spanish lawyer and politician
- Gil Cisneros (born 1971), American philanthropist and politician
- Gustavo Cisneros (born 1946), Venezuelan businessman
- Henry Cisneros (born 1947), American politician; former mayor of San Antonio & Secretary of HUD
- Ignacio Hidalgo de Cisneros (1896–1966), Spanish Air Force general
- Jesús Cisneros (born 1979), Peruvian footballer
- Joaquín Cisneros Fernández (born 1941), Mexican politician
- José Cisneros (born 1956), American politician
- José B. Cisneros (1910–2009), Mexican-born American illustrator and artist
- José Dionisio Cisneros (1796–1847), Venezuelan guerilla
- Manuel Cisneros Sánchez (1904–1971), Peruvian politician, two-term prime minister
- Mark Cisneros (born 1970), American politician and businessman
- Mark Aurelio Cisneros, American multi-instrumentalist, composer, and improviser
- Melchor Liñán y Cisneros (1629–1708), Spanish prelate, colonial official, and viceroy of Peru
- Octavio Cisneros (born 1945), Cuban-born American prelate of the Roman Catholic Church
- Omar Cisneros (born 1989), Cuban track and field Olympic athlete
- Patricia Phelps de Cisneros, Venezuelan philanthropist
- Pedro Treto Cisneros (1939–2013), Mexican baseball organizer, manager, and writer
- Pilar Cisneros (born 1954), Peruvian-Costa Rican journalist and politician
- Renato Cisneros (born 1976), Peruvian journalist and writer
- Ronaldo Cisneros (born 1997), Mexican footballer
- Rudy Cisneros (born 1981), American professional boxer
- Sandra Cisneros (born 1954), American author and poet
- Salvador Cisneros Betancourt (1828–1914), Cuban revolutionary and statesman, president of the republic

With similar last name Cisnero:

- Henry Bell Cisnero (born 1982), Cuban volleyball player
- José L. Cisnero (born 1989) Dominican-born American baseball player
