= Lorena Cuéllar =

Mexican politician

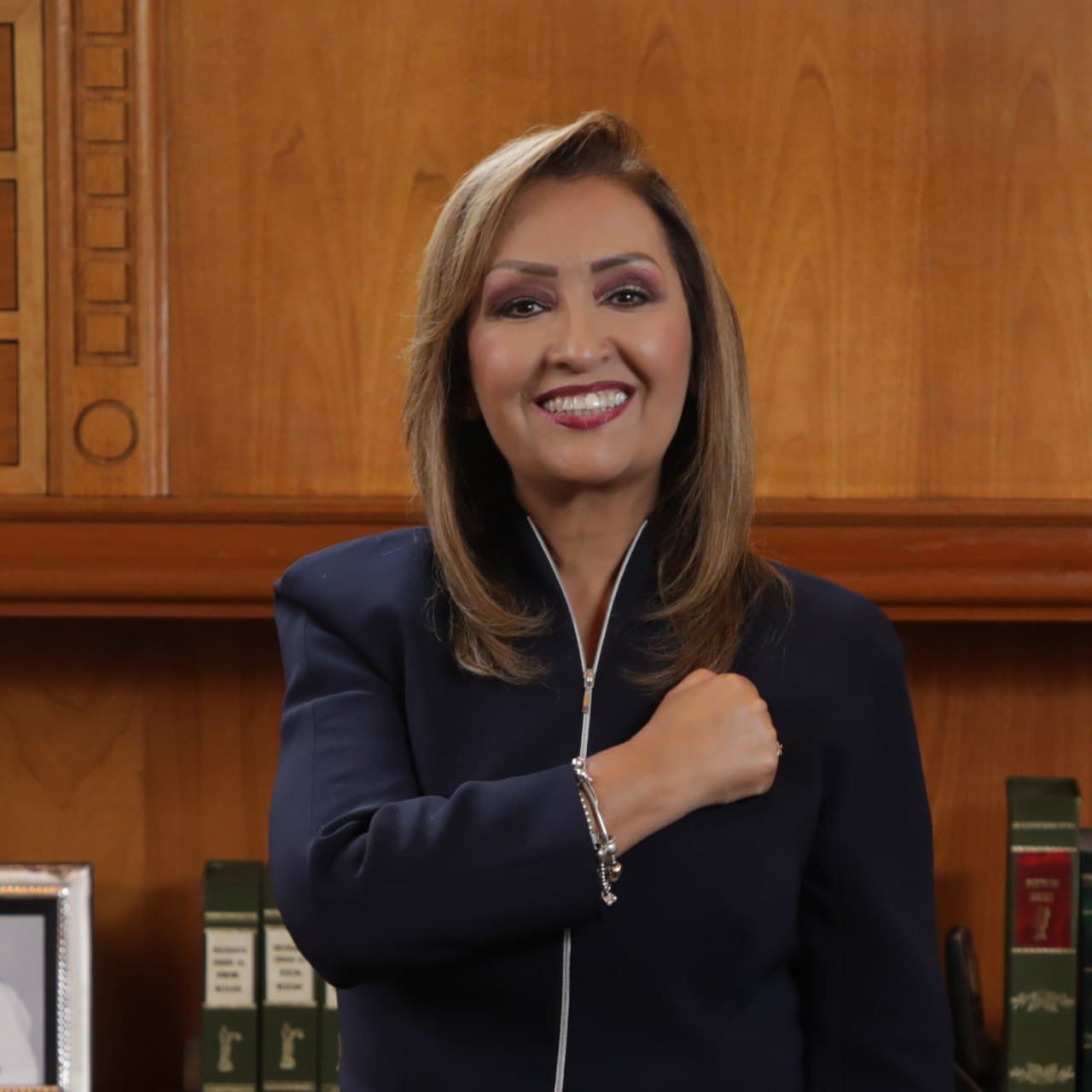

Governor of Tlaxcala
- Incumbent
- Assumed office 31 August 2021
- Preceded by: Marco Antonio Mena Rodríguez

Federal deputy of the Congress of the Union
- In office 1 September 2018 – 31 October 2020
- Preceded by: Ricardo David García Portilla
- Succeeded by: Claudia Pérez Rodríguez

Senator of the Congress of the Union
- In office 1 September 2012 – 31 August 2018
- Preceded by: Minerva Hernández Ramos
- Succeeded by: Ana Lilia Rivera Rivera

Municipal President of Tlaxcala
- In office 2008–2010

Personal details
- Born: Lorena Cuéllar Cisneros; 20 February 1962 (age 64) Tlaxcala, Tlaxcala, Mexico
- Party: National Regeneration Movement (MORENA); Labor Party (PT)
- Spouse: Salvador Ballesteros Rodríguez

Lorena Cuéllar Cisneros (born 20 February 1962) is a Mexican politician affiliated with the National Regeneration Movement (MORENA) who serves as the governor of Tlaxcala (2021–2027). Formerly she served as a member of the Labor Party (PT) as a federal deputy in the 64th Congress representing Tlaxcala's third district; she had previously been a senator for Tlaxcala and mayor of the state capital, Tlaxcala de Xicohténcatl.

== Political career ==
Cuéllar was born in Tlaxcala, Tlaxcala, on 20 February 1962. In 1991, Cuéllar joined the Institutional Revolutionary Party (PRI). While a PRI member, she served as the president of the local chapter of the National System for Integral Family Development (DIF) in the city of Tlaxcala between 1992 and 1994; she also was a city councilor there from 2002 and 2005 and was elected the city's mayor in 2008. Additionally, she served a term in the Tlaxcala state legislature between 2005 and 2007.

In 2010, she made a bid to secure the PRI nomination for governor; in 2011, in her second stint as a state legislator, she tried again, this time to be a PRI senate candidate. This bid did not prosper, and citing a conflict with Governor Mariano González Zarur that left her out in the cold within the party, Cuéllar left the PRI in January 2012 and ran as the Party of the Democratic Revolution (PRD) coalition candidate, winning election to the Senate of the Republic. She sat on a total of five commissions, including a post as president of the Social Development Commission between 27 September 2012, and 26 February 2016.

Cuéllar took leave from the Senate in February 2016 in order to run as the PRD candidate for governor of Tlaxcala; after a two-percentage-point loss to the PRI coalition candidate Marco Antonio Mena Rodríguez, she returned to the Senate. In April 2017, she and two other legislators left the PRD and, alongside independents and members of the National Regeneration Movement (Morena), joined the PT caucus in a spat over commission seats, in which the party motioned to remove a senator who had recently left the PRD from the chamber's Administration Commission and replace her with new party president Alejandra Barrales; the defections swelled the PT's ranks from 7 to 16 senators.

In 2018, Cuéllar ran as the Juntos Haremos Historia coalition's candidate for federal deputy for Tlaxcala's 3rd district, which covers the southern part of the state. She was also included on Morena's party list, in the third position from the fourth electoral region, assuring her of a seat either way. Cuéllar was also tapped by the incoming Morena federal government, which took office on 1 December 2018, to coordinate the federal government's presence in Tlaxcala, which meant she would take leave of her seat within months of being sworn in.

== Family ==
Cuéllar Cisneros is the granddaughter of Joaquín Cisneros Molina (governor of Tlaxcala in 1957–1963) and of Crisanto Cuéllar Abaroa (interim governor of Tlaxcala in 1970). Her uncle, Joaquín Cisneros Fernández, ran unsuccessfully for the governorship in the 1998 state election.
