= José Cisneros (disambiguation) =

José Cisneros may refer to:

- José Cisneros, American politician
- José Cisneros (artist) (born 1910), Mexican artist
- José Dionisio Cisneros, Venezuelan soldier

== See also ==
- José Cisnero (born 1989), Dominican–American baseball player
