= María del Carmen Ramírez =

Mexican politician (born 1956)

María del Carmen Ramírez García (Note: In this Mexican name, the surname is Ramírez and the second or maternal family name is García.) (born 8 March 1956) is a Mexican politician affiliated with the Party of the Democratic Revolution (PRD) who served in the Senate during the 58th and 59th legislatures (2000–2006).

Born in Toluca, State of Mexico, she graduated from the National Autonomous University of Mexico (UNAM) with a degree in communications in 1979. Ramírez García was married to Alfonso Sánchez Anaya, a former member of the Institutional Revolutionary Party (PRI) who in 1999 won the governorship of Tlaxcala representing an alliance between the PRD, the PVEM and the PT; hence from 1999 to 2000 Ramírez García served as president of the DIF in the state of Tlaxcala.

In 2005 she unsuccessfully ran for the governorship of Tlaxcala, losing against the PAN-PT candidate Héctor Ortiz Ortiz.
