= Raúl Régulo Quirino =

Mexican journalist and social worker and murder victim

Raúl Régulo Quirino Garza
- Born: 1982
- Died: 6 January 2012 (aged 30); Cadereyta Jiménez, Nuevo León, Mexico
- Cause of death: Shot to death
- Occupations: Journalist, social worker
- Employer: La Última Palabra

Raúl Régulo Quirino Garza (1982 – 6 January 2012), a Mexican journalist for the La Última Palabra (Translated: "The Last Word") and an employee of the Social Development Ministry in Nuevo Leon, Mexico, was murdered in Cadereyta Jiménez. Quirino was the first Mexican journalist killed in 2012. In 2011, ten Mexican journalists were killed, according to the International Press Institute and nine by the count of the National Human Rights Commission (CNDH).

== Career and Personal ==
Raúl Régulo Quirino Garza was 30 years old when he was shot and killed 6 January 2012. He lived in Cadereyta Jiménez, Nuevo Leon, Mexico. Quirino was both a reporter for La Última Palabra, which is a weekly newspaper, and worked for the local department of social development. According to his editor, the journalist did not use a byline which would have identified him with his journalistic work. He was active in the Mexican Red Cross.

== Death ==
Mentioned locations within Mexico relative to the capital Mexico City.

Raul Regulo Garza Quirino was killed shortly after 5:00 p.m. Friday, January 6, 2012, in Cadereyta Jiménez. Garza was driving in his car when he was chased and attacked by armed men in two other cars. Garza attempted to escape but he was shot at 15 times in the city center at a garage owned by a relative. His murder occurred 300 meters from the city hall office.

The municipal police have several theories. One theory was the gang was out to steal Garza's new car, a black Volkswagen Jetta, and that it was pursuing the wrong person. Another theory is that it the gang could have been affiliated with Los Zetas drug cartel, which controls the area. Los Zetas are adamant about not being reported and cartel has been implicated in the deaths of many journalists. Some reporters that Los Zetas have killed or attempted to kill are Jaime Orozco, Dolores Guadalupe García Escamilla, and María Elizabeth Macías Castro.

== Context ==
Cadereyta Jiménez, a city in northeast Mexico near Monterey, is home to one of northern Mexico’s biggest oil refineries and it is controlled by the Los Zetas drug cartel. Over thirty eight oil workers for the state oil company PEMEX have disappeared and the area is known for mass graves. The flow of drugs and contraband are controlled primarily by Los Zetas, a paramilitary group that once worked for the Gulf Cartel before becoming an independent criminal organization. It was in this area that radio journalist Marco Aurelio Martínez Tijerina was kidnapped and killed in July 2010. According to Reporters Without Borders, eighty journalists have been killed in the past decade and fourteen others have disappeared in Mexico. Most of these killings have gone unpunished.

Violence in Mexico is so prevalent that an estimated 48,000 people have been killed, 5,000 are missing, and thousands of children have been orphaned. Much of Mexico seemed to be lowering crime rates with the exception of the north east side of the country. Violence has soared and have almost tripled in Nuevo León and Coahuila during the 2010 and 2011 years. The eastern half is currently consumed in turf wars and causing large amounts of violence. For example, on 13 May 2012, 49 dismembered bodies were found in a mass killing and Los Zetas took responsibility.

Mexican President Felipe Calderón, who began his term in 2006 and will be ending his term December 2012, focused his presidency on a drug war against the cartels, which is a $39 billion industry. He used military and federal police power and stop money laundering and drug trafficking. A major issue of the 2012 Mexican election was how to stop the cartel violence.

== Impact ==
Shortly after Raúl Quirino was killed, the United States donated $5 million to protect journalists.

He was also the last journalist killed before the Mexican Senate acted in March 2012 on a Constitutional Amendment that would include journalists in a class of victims whose murder would trigger a federal investigation and criminal status, which journalism and press freedom organizations have advocated to tackle the problem of impunity.

== Reactions ==
Oscar González, who is president of a local press association in Nuevo Leon, demanded authorities investigate the murder completely, examine all motives and bring the murderers to justice.

The Inter American Press Association (IAPA) also called for an investigation.

The PEN American Center initiated a letter addressed to President Calderón on behalf of its members which stated: (The organization) "is seriously concerned that the recent murder of Raúl Régulo Garza Quirino indicates an ongoing intolerance of journalists and a worsening climate of impunity in Mexico. We therefore call for a full investigation into the murder, and reiterate our call on President Felipe Calderón to fulfill promises to make crimes against journalists a federal offense by amending the Constitution so that federal authorities have the power to investigate, prosecute, and punish such crimes, and to immediately implement the journalist protection mechanisms it promised in November 2010.is seriously concerned that the recent murder of Raúl Régulo Garza Quirino indicates an ongoing intolerance of journalists and a worsening climate of impunity in Mexico. We therefore call for a full investigation into the murder, and reiterate our call on President Felipe Calderón to fulfill promises to make crimes against journalists a federal offense by amending the Constitution so that federal authorities have the power to investigate, prosecute, and punish such crimes, and to immediately implement the journalist protection mechanisms it promised in November 2010."

== See also ==
- Mexican drug war
- List of journalists killed in Mexico
