= Santillán =

Santillán or Santillan is a Spanish surname. Notable people with the surname include:

- Akira Santillan (born 1997), Australian tennis player
- Diego Abad de Santillán (1897–1983), Spanish Argentine author, economist, leading figure in the Spanish and Argentine anarchist movements
- Jesica Santillan (1985–2003), undocumented immigrant from Mexico who died after an organ transplant operation in the U.S.
- Julian Hernández Santillán (born 1963), Mexican politician
- Manuel Santillán (1894–1982), Mexican geological engineer and politician
- Mario Santillán (born 1981), Mexican Paralympian athlete
- Maxie Santillan Jr. (1956–2022), American actor
- Pedro Velarde y Santillán (1779–1808), Spanish artillery captain famous for his heroic death
- Pura Santillan-Castrence (1905–2007), Filipino writer and diplomat
- Ramón de Santillán, (1791–1863), Spanish soldier, politician, and minister of finance
- Tony Santillan (born 1997), American baseball player

== See also ==
- Huétor Santillán, municipality located in the province of Granada, Spain
- Tasa de Santillán or Rate of Santillán, a rate of indigenous labor applied in the Kingdom of Chile
- Santillana (disambiguation)
