= Joaquín Cisneros Fernández =

Mexican lawyer and politician (born 1941)

- Born: 25 May 1941 (age 85); Tlaxcala, Mexico
- Occupations: Politician and lawyer
- Political party: PRI

Joaquín Cisneros Fernández (Note: In this Mexican name, the surname is Cisneros and the second or maternal family name is Fernández.) (born 25 May 1941) is a Mexican lawyer and politician affiliated with the Institutional Revolutionary Party (PRI).

== Political career ==
Cisneros Fernández was born in the city of Tlaxcala in 1941. He joined the PRI in 1959.

He served in the Senate during the 58th and 59th Congresses (2000–2006), representing the state of Tlaxcala, and as a deputy during the 56th Congress (1994–1997), representing Tlaxcala's 1st district. He has also served twice as the municipal president of Tlaxcala (1980–1982 and 1992–1994) and, from 1966 to 1970, was borough chief in Álvaro Obregón, Mexico City.

In the 1998 state election, he ran for governor of Tlaxcala but was defeated by Alfonso Sánchez Anaya of the Party of the Democratic Revolution (PRD).

== Family ==
Cisneros Fernández is the son of Joaquín Cisneros Molina, who served as governor of Tlaxcala in 1940–1941 and was private secretary to President Gustavo Díaz Ordaz during his 1964–1970 administration.
