= Marco Antonio Mena Rodríguez =

Governor of Tlaxcala, Mexico

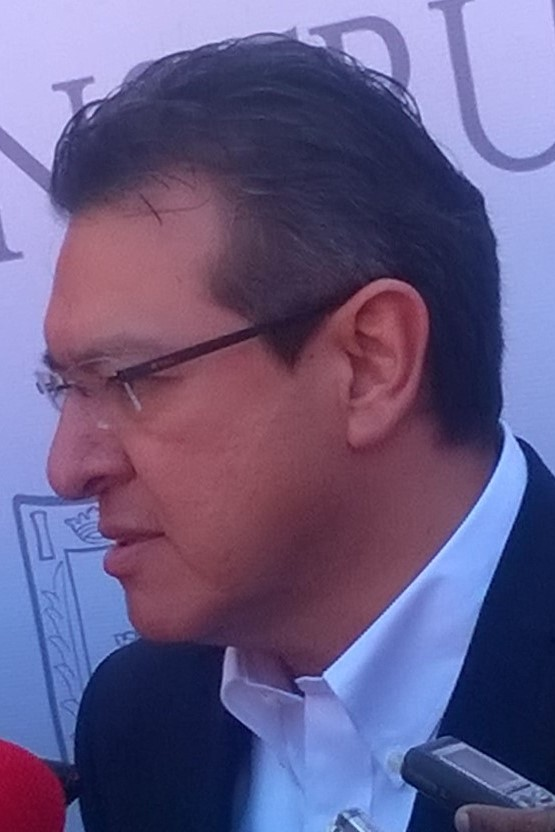

Governor of Tlaxcala
- In office January 1, 2017 – August 30, 2021
- Preceded by: Mariano González Zarur
- Succeeded by: Lorena Cuéllar Cisneros

Personal details
- Born: July 9, 1969 (age 56) Tlaxcala de Xicohténcatl, Tlaxcala, Mexico
- Party: PRI
- Spouse: Sandra Chávez Ruelas
- Education: El Colegio de Mexico (BA); University of Chicago (MPP)
- Occupation: Politician

Marco Antonio Mena Rodríguez (born 1969) is a Mexican politician from the Institutional Revolutionary Party (PRI). The governor of Tlaxcala from January 2017 to August 2021, he won the 2016 gubernatorial election after previously serving in several administrative positions as well as being a deputy in the state congress.

== Life ==
Mena Rodríguez was born on July 9, 1968, in Tlaxcala de Xicohténcatl to two primary school teachers. He received his undergraduate degree in administration from the Colegio de México, as well as a master's degree in public policy from the University of Chicago; he was the first Mexican to be admitted to the latter program and received a Fulbright–García Robles scholarship to study there.

His first position in civil service was with the SEDESOL, where he championed technical collaboration agreements with various states; during this time, he also was a national delegate from Mexico to the OECD on two occasions in 2001. He later served as the coordinator of advisers to the president of the Federal Electoral Institute, during which time he observed presidential elections in Ecuador and made a presentation on the Mexican elections of 2006 to the Venice Commission; worked for the IMSS as a liaison with social and business organizations; and as the state secretary of tourism.

In 2013, voters in the first local district of Tlaxcala, which included the capital city, elected Mena Rodríguez to the state congress. In his term as a state deputy, he promoted initiatives that brought state law into harmony with new federal educational and political reforms, including the reduction of the state congress from 32 to 25 deputies. From January 25 to December 1, 2015, he served as president of the PRI in the state, replacing Ricardo García Portilla, who successfully pursued a seat in the federal Chamber of Deputies.

=== Gubernatorial elections ===
On January 6, 2016, the PRI unanimously selected Mena to be its gubernatorial candidate in Tlaxcala. His campaign was joined by the PVEM, Nueva Alianza and the Socialist Party in Tlaxcala.

With 189,499 votes (13,000 more than the PRD candidate), Tlaxcala voters elected Mena governor on June 5.

=== Later career ===
In August 2023, President Andrés Manuel López Obrador appointed Mena Rodríguez to serve as the director general of the National Lottery. He remained in that position until February 2025.

=== Personal life ===
Mena Rodríguez is married to Sandra Chávez Ruelas, and has two twins, Constanza and Claudio Antonio.
