= Santillana =

Santillana may refer to:

== People ==
- Antonio Fernández Santillana (1876–1909), Spanish-French aviation pioneer
- Everardo Zapata Santillana (born 1926), Peruvian teacher and author
- Íñigo López de Mendoza, 1st Marquis of Santillana (1398–1458), Castilian politician and poet
- Leonardo Santillana (born 1998), Mexican equestrian
- Santillana (footballer) (born 1952), Carlos Alonso González, Spanish footballer

== Places ==
- Santillana del Mar, a town in Cantabria, Spain
- Santillana de Campos, a hamlet of Osorno la Mayor, Palencia, Spain
- Santillana District, Huanta district, Peru

== Other uses ==
- Grupo Santillana, a Spanish publisher owned by Penguin Random House

== See also ==
- Santillán, a surname
