= Alfonso Sánchez Anaya =

Mexican politician (1941–2026)

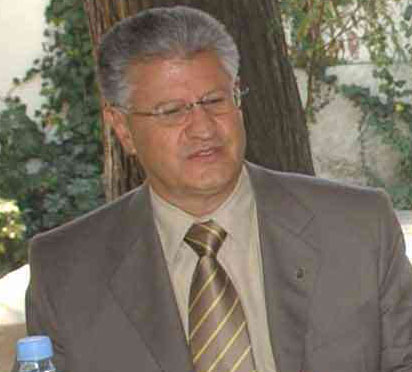

Senator for Tlaxcala
- In office 1 September 2006 – 31 August 2012

Governor of Tlaxcala
- In office 15 January 1999 – 14 January 2005
- Preceded by: José Antonio Álvarez Lima
- Succeeded by: Héctor Ortiz Ortiz

Federal deputy for Tlaxcala's 2nd
- In office 1 September 1994 – 31 August 1997

Personal details
- Born: 23 January 1941 Apizaco, Tlaxcala, Mexico
- Died: 26 July 2026 (aged 85)
- Party: MORENA
- Other political affiliations: PRD (1998–2010s); PRI (1958–1998)
- Spouse: María del Carmen Ramírez García
- Relatives: Emilio Sánchez Piedras (uncle)
- Education: UNAM
- Occupation: Politician
- Profession: Veterinarian

Alfonso Abraham Sánchez Anaya (Note: In this Mexican name, the surname is Sánchez and the second or maternal family name is Anaya.) (23 January 1941 – 26 July 2026) was a Mexican veterinarian and politician from the state of Tlaxcala. At the time of his death he was affiliated with the National Regeneration Movement (Morena), although he had formerly belonged to both the Party of the Democratic Revolution (PRD) and the Institutional Revolutionary Party (PRI). He served in both chambers of Congress and was governor of Tlaxcala from 1999 to 2005.

== Early life and career ==
Alfonso Sánchez Anaya was born in Apizaco, Tlaxcala, on 23 January 1941. He joined the PRI in 1958 and graduated from the National Autonomous University of Mexico (UNAM) in 1964 with a degree in veterinary medicine. After working in the private sector for Laboratorios Syntex, he joined the federal Secretariat of Agriculture and Water Resources (SARH), where he held various positions related to the development of livestock raising and agricultural production and served as the secretariat's representative in Tlaxcala. He also held posts in the Tlaxcala state government, including secretary for economic development and finance secretary.

In the 1994 general election, he was elected to the Chamber of Deputies, representing Tlaxcala's 2nd district for the PRI. During his time in Congress, he served as secretary of the lower house's livestock committee.

In 1998, disagreeing with the PRI's nomination process for the upcoming gubernatorial election, he switched allegiance to the PRD and, on 8 November 1998, was elected governor of Tlaxcala for a coalition of the PRD with the PVEM and the PT. His defeat of the PRI's Joaquín Cisneros Fernández made him Tlaxcala's first post-Revolution opposition governor and ended decades of PRI domination in the state. He served from 1999 to 2005 and, during his administration, he promoted the establishment of the National Conference of Governors (CONAGO) and the Colegio de Tlaxcala, established state institutes for women, youth, and sports, and oversaw the construction of the General Regional Hospital, a community hospital in Tlaxco, and a convention centre in the state capital. His time in office also saw the creation of the Tlaxcala Art Museum and the Tlaxcala Zoo.

Towards the end of his governorship, however, he was accused of losing the state for the PRD through his support for his wife, María del Carmen Ramírez García, to succeed him in the 2004 election. After an internal party selection process that La Jornada called an "imposition", she placed third, losing to Héctor Ortiz Ortiz of a coalition led by the National Action Party (PAN).

After his gubernatorial term, he was elected to the Senate for Tlaxcala in the 2006 general election, where he served during the 60th and 61st sessions of Congress (2006–2012) as a member of the PRD. During his tenure, he chaired the Senate committee on regional development.

In the 2015 mid-terms, Sánchez Anaya contested Tlaxcala's 1st district for the National Regeneration Movement but placed second behind Rosalinda Muñoz of the PRI. During the presidency of Andrés Manuel López Obrador (2018–2024), he headed the administration and finance units at the federal Secretariat of Security and Citizen Protection (SSPC) and Secretariat of the Interior (SEGOB).

== Personal life and death ==
Alfonso Sánchez Anaya was the eleventh child of Lauro Sánchez Piedras (municipal president of Tlaxco in 1977–1979) and Dolores Anaya Armas. His paternal uncle, Emilio Sánchez Piedras, was governor of Tlaxcala in 1975–1981 and assisted Sánchez Anaya in his political career. He was married to María del Carmen Ramírez García and his son, Alfonso Sánchez García, was elected municipal president of Tlaxcala in 2024 and unsuccessfully sought Morena's nomination for the 2027 gubernatorial election.

Sánchez Anaya died on 26 July 2026, at the age of 85.

== Notes ==
Preceded by José Antonio Álvarez Lima	Governor of Tlaxcala; 1999–2005	Succeeded by Héctor Ortiz Ortiz
