= Emilio Sánchez Piedras =

Mexican politician (1927–1981

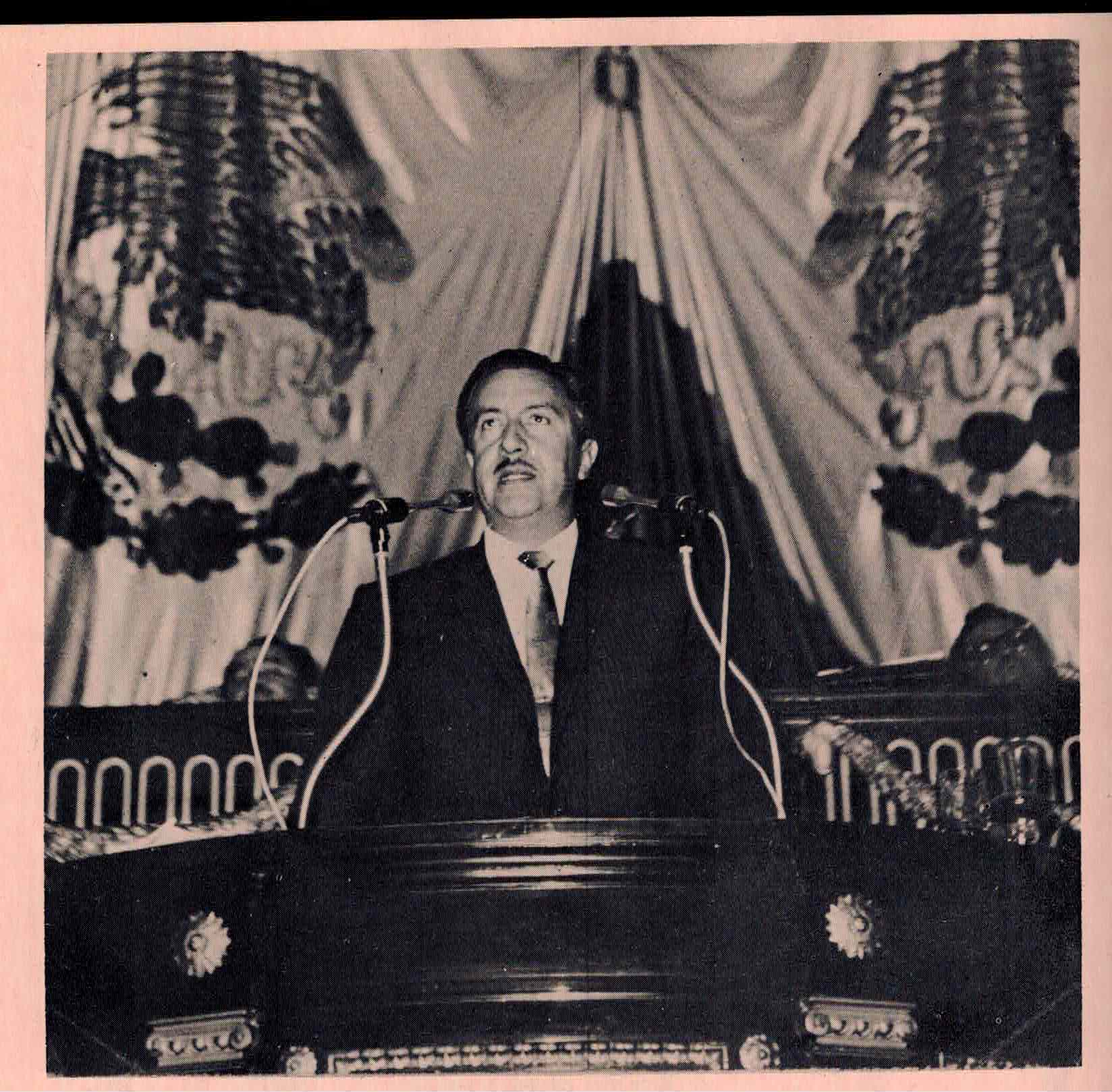
- Sánchez Piedras addressing the Chamber of Deputies during his second congressional term

Governor of Tlaxcala
- In office 15 January 1975 – 15 January 1981
- Preceded by: Luciano Huerta Sánchez
- Succeeded by: Tulio Hernández Gómez

Federal deputy for Tlaxcala's 1st
- In office 1958–1961

Federal deputy for Tlaxcala's 2nd
- In office 1952–1955

Personal details
- Born: 1 November 1927 Apizaco, Tlaxcala, Mexico
- Died: 13 June 1981 (aged 53) Federal District, Mexico
- Party: PRI
- Relatives: Alfonso Sánchez Anaya (nephew)
- Education: UNAM
- Occupation: Politician
- Profession: Lawyer

Emilio Sánchez Piedras (Note: In this Mexican name, the surname is Sánchez and the second or maternal family name is Piedras.) (1 November 1927 – 13 June 1981) was a Mexican lawyer and politician from the state of Tlaxcala. A member of the Institutional Revolutionary Party (PRI), he served in the Congress of Tlaxcala and two terms in the federal Chamber of Deputies, and was governor of Tlaxcala from 1975 to 1981.

== Political career ==
Emilio Sánchez Piedras was born in Apizaco, Tlaxcala, on 1 November 1927. His basic education was in his home state, and he subsequently completed a law degree, with an honourable mention, at the law school of the National Autonomous University of Mexico (UNAM) in 1941. That same year, he secured employment as a public prosecutor for the Federal District and the federal territories.

From 1944 to 1951, he was director of public works in the Tlaxcala state government, and he later served as private secretary to governors Mauro Ángulo Hernández (1944–1945) and Rafael Ávila Bretón (1945–1951).

Sánchez Piedras served 10 years as a local deputy in the Congress of Tlaxcala. In the 1952 general election, he was elected to the Chamber of Deputies to represent Tlaxcala's 2nd district during the 42nd Congress and, in the 1958 general election, he returned to Congress for its 44th session, representing Tlaxcala's 1st district. During his second congressional term, he caused Adolfo López Mateos's government diplomatic difficulties with the United States after making a speech in support of the Cuban Revolution: a U.S. delegation attending the session withdrew, and Sánchez Piedras was banished to the political wilderness for 15 years.

Sánchez Piedras served as governor of Tlaxcala from 15 January 1975 to 15 January 1981. His administration oversaw the construction of the Ciudad Industrial Xicohténcatl in Tetla de la Solidaridad and of two universities: the Autonomous University of Tlaxcala (UATx) and the Technological Institute of Apizaco.

Six months after leaving office, Sánchez Piedras was in an automobile accident that left him with broken ribs and a broken leg. On 13 June 1981, after a week's hospitalisation, he died of a heart attack while in intensive care, aged 53. He was buried in Mexico City's Panteón Francés.
