= Murder of José Luis Cerda Meléndez and Luis Emanuel Ruiz Carrillo =

Kidnapping and murder in Monterrey, Nuevo León, Mexico

José Luis Cerda Meléndez
- Born: Jose ca. 1978
- Disappeared: March 24, 2011; Televisa-Monterrey headquarters
- Status: found
- Died: March 25, 2011 (Age 33); Monterrey, Nuevo León, Mexico
- Cause of death: Gunshot wound in the head
- Body discovered: March 25, 2011
- Other name: La Gata
- Occupation: Entertainment show host
- Employer: Televisa
- Known for: his comedy routine with partner Oscar Burgos ("El Perro Guarumo")
- Notable work: El Club ("The Club")

Luis Emanuel Ruiz Carrillo
- Born: Luis Emanual Ruiz Carrillo ca. 1990
- Disappeared: March 24, 2011; Televisa-Monterrey headquarters
- Status: found
- Died: March 25, 2011 (Age 21); Monterrey, Nuevo León, Mexico
- Cause of death: Gunshot wound in the head
- Body discovered: March 25, 2011
- Resting place: Panteón Jardines del Recuerdo de Monclova; 26°57′04″N 101°23′51″W
- Education: La Universidad Metropolitana of Monclova
- Occupations: Photojournalist and TV camera operator
- Years active: 3 years
- Employer(s): La Prensa de Monclova and Channel 4 (Monclova)
- Partner: Gloria Rodríguez

Murder of José Luis Cerda Meléndez and Luis Emanuel Ruiz Carrillo is about the triple murder of a journalist, a TV show host and the TV host's cousin on 25 March 2011 in Monterrey, Nuevo León, Mexico. The triple murder was attributed to a symbolic connection between Cerda, the media entertainer, and Los Zetas, which had become the target of other drug cartels. On the same day of the murder, a coalition of Mexican media signed "Agreement for News Coverage of Violence" that would give media a unified strategy for portraying cartels in media, which was meant to make it safer for journalists like Ruiz.

José Cerda (ca. 1978 – 25 March 2011) was a Mexican TV personality on Televisa national network in Monterrey who was popularly known as La Gata, a stereotype of a gang member, on the TV show El Club ("The Club"). Cerda's cousin Juan Roberto Gómez was also a victim.

Luis Ruiz (ca. 1991 – 25 March 2011) was a student and working journalist who had traveled from Monclova, Coahuila, to Monterrey for an interview with Cerda. He became an innocent bystander when he was with the target of a drug cartel murder.

== Cerda's early history ==
José Luis Cerda Meléndez was a former gang member and drug addict, who began using drugs at 10 and went into treatment at a halfway house at age 30, and after rehabilitation turned to entertainment. Before he became an entertainer, Cerda was a bricklayer. At the time of his murder, Cerda was a TV personality and host for the popular Televisa program El Club ("The Club"). Cerda was recognized nationally for his comedy routine with partner Oscar Burgos. While Cerda played a street thug who danced to Colombian music, Burgos played the role of his sidekick dog, who was known as "El Perro Guarumo". Since Cerda was playing the stereotypical gang member, he often made the "clicka" hand motion, which has been associated with the drug cartel Los Zetas. After becoming a TV star, Cerda had appeared at charity events and let his name to causes.

== Ruiz's early history ==
Luis Emanuel Ruiz Carrillo, the eldest son, helped his mother, who worked in a steel plant, earn more money for her and her three sons. Luis Ruiz was a twenty-one-year-old college student who was in his third year studies of communication at the Universidad Metropolitana de Monclova. He was a photographer and he had received the State Student Award in 2010 for his work. Ruiz had been employed at the newspaper La Prensa de Monclova for 7–8 months and as a cameraman for Channel 4 in Monclova for three years. His last service was held at Church José Obrero in Obrera Sur and then he was buried at Panteón Jardines del Recuerdo.

== Death ==
Monterrey and Monclova are shown within Mexico and relative to the capital Mexico City.

On 24 March 2011, José Luis Cerda Meléndez was walking one block to his white Stratus automobile around 8:30 p.m. after a program at Televisa's network studios in Monterrey, Nuevo León. He was with Juan Roberto Gómez, who was Cerda's cousin, and student and journalist Luis Emanuel Ruiz Carrillo. Ruiz had traveled from Monclova, Coahuila, on assignment with La Prensa de Monclova to interview and photograph Cerda and his partner Oscar Burgos for a story about recovery from drug addiction and becoming a TV star. The group was abducted at Cerda's car, which was parked at the intersection of Ignacio López Rayón and Albino Espinoza, by a group of armed men with covered faces who forced them into a Suburban SUV. The three men were missing for 11 hours.

The next morning, Cerda's body was found along Bulevar Miguel de la Madrid in Guadalupe, Nuevo León after 7:00 a.m. The sign was left on a wall near his body, which is typical in drug cartel-related murders, reading, "Stop cooperating with Los Zetas. Signed DCG. Greetings architect No. 1." Cerda's hands had been tied up and he had been shot in the head. While news teams reported live from the scene where the body had been discovered, including Televisa (TV network), a vehicle appeared with armed men who removed Cerda's corpse while police present were immobilized, and the abductors then took his corpse to a spot called Fundidora Park where Cerda had earlier called for a march for peace against violence in Nuevo León. At the time Cerda's corpse was taken, police received reports that two other bodies had been found six kilometers away, and this led police to Ruiz and Gómez who were found on a country road with multiple gunshot wounds.

== Context ==
As "La Gata", Cerda was a stereotype of the Zetas, and the Gulf Cartel was an enemy of the Zetas for control over territory. Luis Emanuel Ruiz Carrillo, while an innocent bystander according to his editor, was one of 8 news media-related murder victims of drug war violence in 2011, according to Freedom House. The previous year, 10 journalists had been killed.

== Impact ==
The triple murder happened on the same day, 24 March 2011, that news media organizations, led by Televisa (TV network), signed "Agreement for News Coverage of Violence" (Cobertura Informativa de la Violencia del Crimen Organizado), which would present a united front on the presentation drug cartels amidst the five-year-old Mexican drug war. One of the goals was to make standards so that individual journalists would not be targeted for individual decisions. There were news organizations that did not sign the agreement, such as Reforma and La Jornada, Proceso magazine and MVS (TV network), and Reporters Without Borders also refused to sign as it said the agreement went against its standards of press freedom.

== Reactions ==
Jesús Medina, who was Ruiz's editor at La Prensa de Monclova, said, "There was so much ahead for him. He had a personal quality and a professional quality that made him stand out."

The Committee to Protect Journalists, in a statement, said, "Mexican authorities must launch an exhaustive investigation into this brutal attack and work to reverse the pattern of impunity in journalist killings."

== See also ==
- Mexican drug war
- List of journalists killed in Mexico
