= 2011 Mexican fire season =

Wildfire season in Mexico

2011 Mexican Fire Season
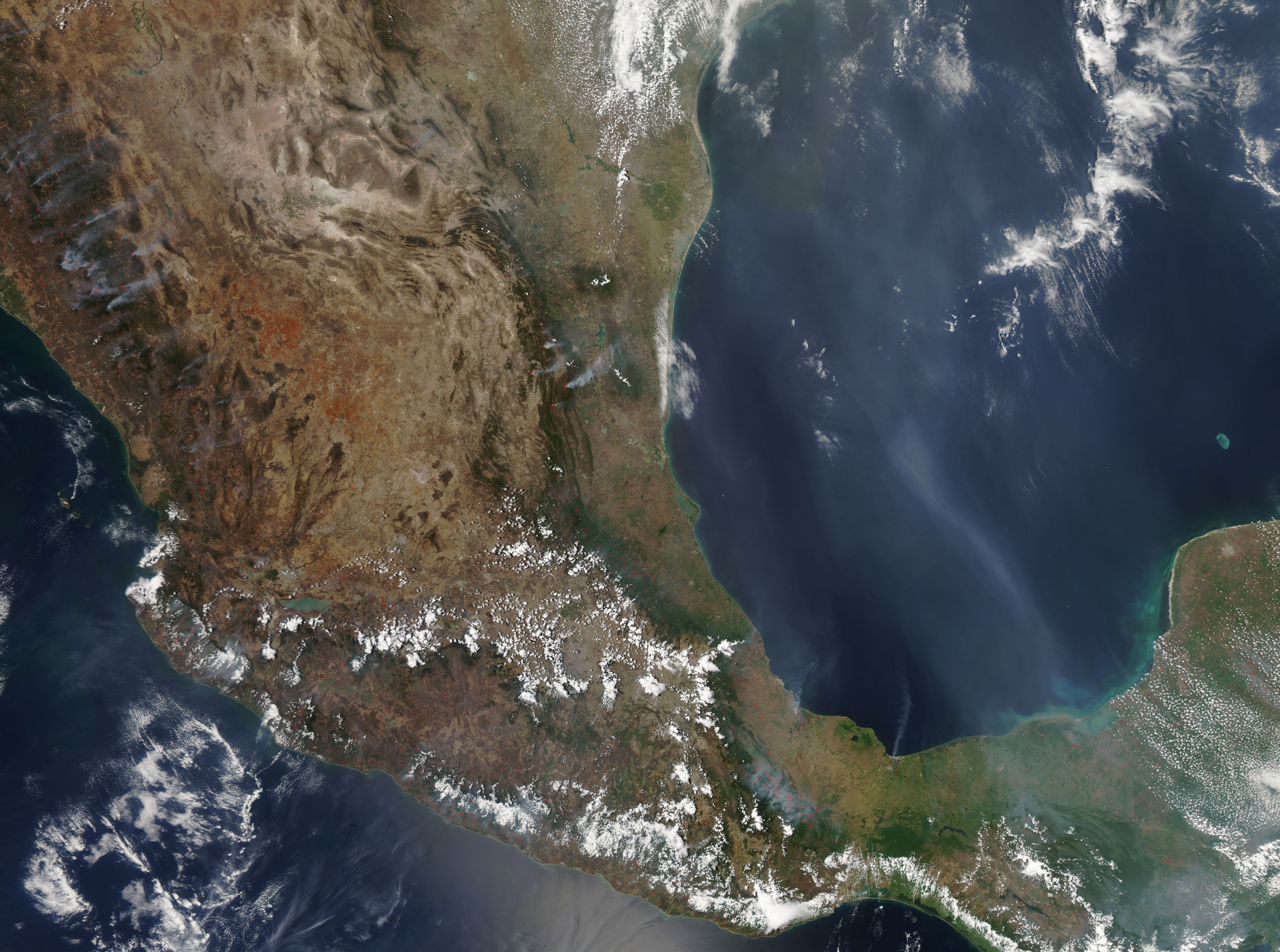
- Fires, marked in red, burning throughout Mexico
- Date: January 2011 – May 2011
- Location: Mexico

Statistics
- Burned area: 1,300,000 acres (530,000 ha)

Ignition
- Cause: mostly human activities, volatile weather conditions

The 2011 Mexico fire season is the fire season which occurred between January and May 2011. Usually during May, the first wet-season rains begin to fall, followed by a soggy five months. As of May 20, 2011, the fire season had not slowed and the flames continued to burn forests. Fires burned throughout the country, casting a smoky haze from the Pacific Ocean to the Gulf of Mexico. 2011 turned out to be an extreme fire season in Mexico. By May 19, more than 530,000 hectares (1,300,000 acres or 2,000 square miles) of land had burned in the country since the beginning of the year, according to the Mexican government. In terms of area burned, 2011 surpassed every year since (and including) 1998, making it one of the most challenging fire seasons for 30 years.

== Cause of severity ==
The severity of the 2011 fire season in Mexico was partly due to the 2010 rainy season, one of the wettest on record. Rains from Hurricane Alex flooded northern Mexico in July 2010, and then torrential rains caused widespread flooding in southern Mexico in September 2010. All of this excess water allowed thick grass to grow. During the dry season, which begins in October and lasts through May, the grass dried, providing ample fuel for fires. In April and May 2011, hot, dry, and windy conditions allowed fires throughout the country to surge out of control.

== Ignition sources ==
Many of the fires started as agricultural fires, traditionally used to clear farm or pasture land, according to the Mexican Ministry of Environment and Natural Resources. The widespread nature of the fires suggests that people deliberately started many of them. Other reasons why the wildfires were able to spread so quickly is due to the previous Hurricane Alex, the previous year. The hurricane brought much needed rain to the area, but due to trees and shrubs growing and eventually drying out in the dry season, it created much more fuel than previous years "Thunderstorms and steady strong winds with gusts up to 110 km/h (70 mph) completed the formula for a dangerous, fast-moving wildfire".

== Ecological impact ==
Most of the land burned in 2011 was grassland. This means that even though the fires burned a greater area in 2011, the ecological impact is far smaller than the last severe fire season in 1998, when large tracts of rare forest burned. The grasslands will recover in the next rainy season. A positive effect of such a devastating forest fire is that the carbon and other minerals from burnt trees enriches the soil, and helps regenerate grassland areas faster.[2] Some negative effects of a forest fire such as this is that CO_{2} emissions are generally much higher, as well as soil erosion being intensified; such as about 86 million metric tonnes of soil erodes per year. It generally takes about 30 years to rehabilitate forest areas ravaged by fire, with reforestation costing up to $2400/ha.

== Response and foreign aid ==
Due to the fast moving aspects of a wildfire, it was already too late by the time the USA and Canada's forest fire teams managed to arrive. Canada's "Mars Water-Bombers" stationed in Vancouver assisted in the containment of the flames, but only the next rainy season was able to fully extinguish the grasslands.
