= Pilar Cisneros Gallo =

Costa Rican politician (born 1954)

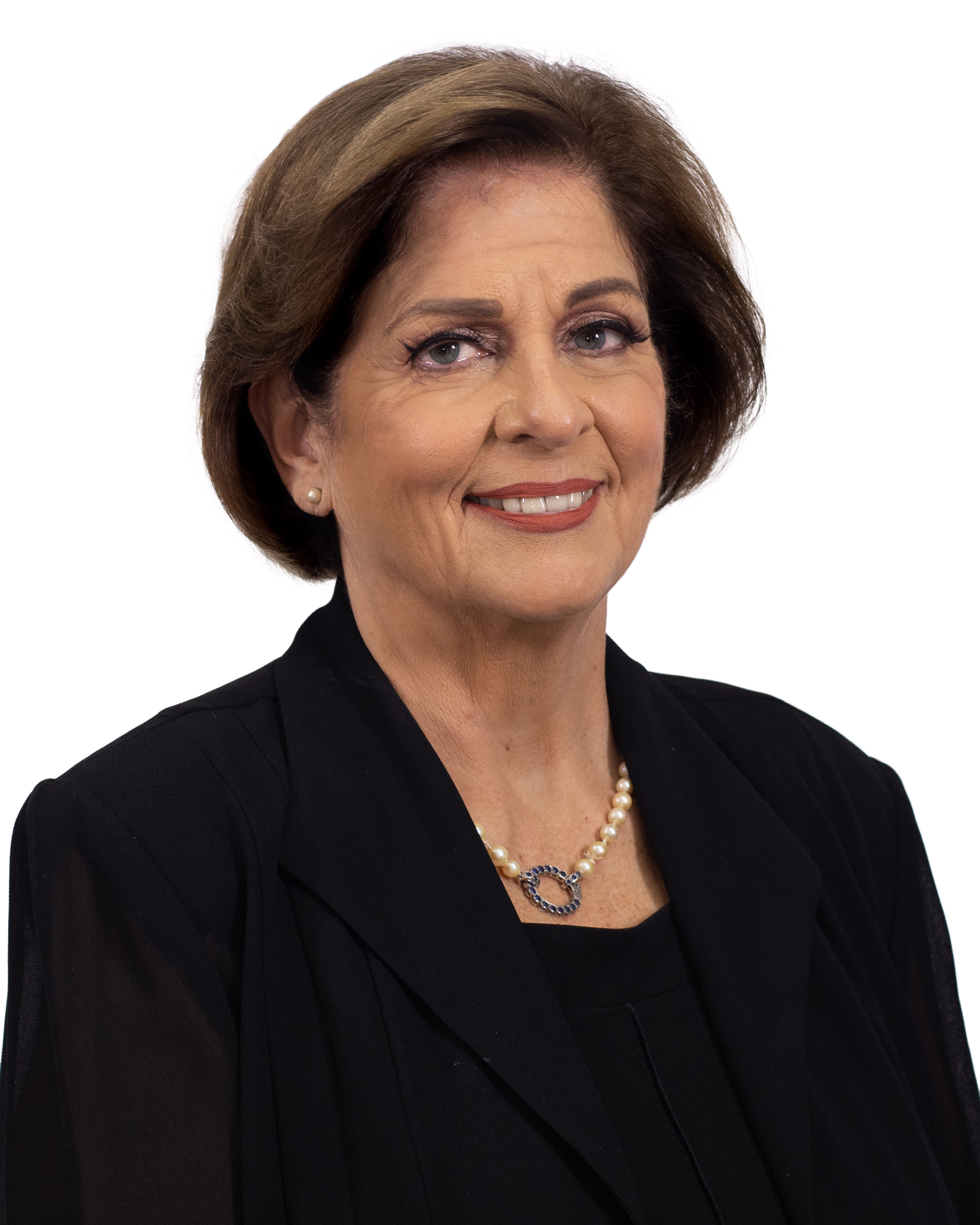
- Official portrait, 2022

Communication advisor ad honorem to the Presidency of Costa Rica
- Incumbent
- Assumed office 8 May 2026
- Preceded by: Federico "Choreco" Cruz

Deputy of the Legislative Assembly of Costa Rica for San José
- In office 1 May 2022 – 30 April 2026
- Preceded by: Floria María Segreda Sagot
- Succeeded by: Anna Katharina Müller Castro

Personal details
- Born: Pilar Cisneros Gallo; 1954 (age 71–72) Lima, Peru
- Party: Sovereign People's Party (since 2022)
- Other political affiliations: Social Democratic Progress Party (until 2022)

Pilar Cisneros Gallo (born 1954) is a Peruvian-born Costa Rican journalist and politician who is the communication advisor to president Laura Fernández and a former member of the Legislative Assembly of Costa Rica.
