= Mark Cisneros (musician) =

American multi-instrumentalist based in Washington, D.C.

Mark Cisneros (born Marcos Aurelio Cisneros) is an American multi-instrumentalist, composer, and improviser based in Washington, D.C. His work spans punk, jazz, experimental and improvised music. He is the guitarist in the post-punk group Hammered Hulls and has performed and recorded with Kid Congo and the Pink Monkey Birds, among others.

== Early life ==
Cisneros was born in Los Angeles and relocated to the U.S. East Coast in his 20s. Before settling in Washington, D.C., he lived in Brooklyn and studied saxophone at The New School in New York City, working with Ahmed Abdullah, David Schnitter, Joe Chambers and Tim Price.

== Career ==
In 2019 Hammered Hulls released their debut single on Dischord Records, followed by their first full-length, Careening (2022). The group's lineup—Alec MacKaye (vocals), Mary Timony (bass), Mark Cisneros (guitar), and Chris Wilson (drums)—has been noted by the Washington Post.

Cisneros has been a contributing guitarist and songwriter with Kid Congo and the Pink Monkey Birds; his addition to the band was discussed in a 2016 interview around the album La Araña Es La Vida.

He played drums in the 2017 reunion shows by The Make-Up, with the lineup announced by Pitchfork. He has also performed on bass with Wayne Kramer (MC5) in the latter's solo group.

In 2019 he toured on guitar with Shannon Shaw, with contemporary coverage listing Cisneros among the touring band.

Cisneros also records and performs with the Washington, D.C. band Des Demonas on In The Red Records.

In improvised and experimental settings, Cisneros has performed in a duo with drummer Nik Francis and appears in Zach Barocas' project New Freedom Sound (with J. Robbins and Gordon Withers). Credits and personnel for New Freedom Sound's releases have been carried by Dischord and related outlets.

Though primarily a tenor saxophonist, Cisneros has focused extensively on the stritch—a straight alto saxophone closely associated with Rahsaan Roland Kirk.

=== Selected recordings ===
With bands

- Hammered Hulls – S/T (EP, 2019), Dischord Records.
- Hammered Hulls – Careening (2022), Dischord Records.
- Des Demonas – Des Demonas (2017), In The Red Records.
