= Manuel Santillán =

Mexican politician

Manuel Santillán Osorno (September 29, 1894 – October 12, 1982) was a Mexican geological engineer and politician.

Manuel Santillán, the youngest of three sons (Adalberto, the oldest, and Isuaro, in the middle), was born on September 29, 1894, in the Hacienda de Xalostoc (Tlaxco, Tlaxcala), to Calixto Santillan and Manuela Osorno.

Santillán finished preparatory studies at Universidad Veracruzana in Jalapa, Veracruz and later received three engineering degrees. The first in geology and geodesic engineering; the second degree in Mining and Metallurgical Engineering; and the third in civil engineering from the School of Engineering at the National Autonomous University of Mexico (UNAM).

== Early career ==
He began his career as a mining engineer in Pachuca, Hidalgo in 1919. With Tomas Barrera, Santillán conducted explorations in northern Baja California in 1928. They published their results with a geological map in 1930. Many of the fossils obtained by Santillan and Barrera near Arroyo Santa Catarina were left at the University of California (Loc. 647 U. C. Coll.).

He was named Chief of Geologists for Mining and Petroleum in the Mexican Department of Industry and Commerce in 1929. In April 1929, Leopoldo Salazar Salinas, Director of the Geological Institute of Mexico, commissioned Santillán to study the mineral deposits of Pachuca and their relation to Miocene rocks. He published the report in 1931.

From 1931, Santillán and Enrique M. González were the editors the journal Anuario, published by the Instituto de Geología, Geofísica y Geodesia (UNAM). He was the Director of the Geological National Institute (Instituto de Geología, Geofísica y Geodesia) from January 21, 1932, to January 21, 1941. One of his first actions as director was to request the transfer of the duplicates of fossils and minerals, which were guarded by the Secretary Agriculture and Development, to the Geological National Institute (UNAM). In this way began to consolidate Collection of Paleontology at the Institute (Carreño and Montellano-Ballesteros 140).

Santillán served as consulting Engineer to the Presidency, 1933. In 1934, he became Chief Geologist of the Department of National Economy. On November 9, 1936, Santillan opened the inaugural session of 146th Meeting of The American Institute of Mining, Metallurgical, and Petroleum Engineers in Mexico City, November 9–15.

Manuel Santillán was named the Vice President of the Sociedad Geológica en México from 1936 to 1941.

Under the administration of the president of Mexico, Lázaro Cárdenas, Manuel Santillán held four cabinet-level positions: Subsecretary of the Department of National Economy, 1935–36; Member of the technical Commission of the Presidency, 1935; Director of the National Petroleum Administration, 1937–1938 (a government organization formed to handle government-owned petroleum properties); and Subsecretary of Public Works, 1938-40. Manuel Santillán was one of the founding members of the Comisión Federal de Electricidad in 1937.

== State oil expropriation ==
=== Background ===
In December 1933 a Congressional decree established Petróleos de México S.A. (Petromex)--a publicly traded company in which just Mexican nationals could purchase equity—with the purpose of supplying the fuel requirements of the National Railways in particular and the domestic market with petroleum products in general. It was also given the responsibility of regulating the domestic petroleum markets and training Mexican personnel in all aspects of the industry. Petromex lasted only until September 1934, when it was dissolved owing to a lack of interest on the part of the investing public, and the assets and shares of the company were transferred to the Control de Administración del Petróleo Nacional. In November 1936 a law was passed that expropriated for the state all assets considered to be of public utility, including oil and natural gas, and in January 1937 the state-owned Administración General del Petróleo Nacional was created to explore and develop the national reserves that were assigned to it.

Manuel Santillán was the Director of the National Petroleum Administration from January 1937 to May 6, 1938. By 1936, Germany displaced Great Britain, and became the second-largest trading partner of Mexico after the United States. The oil production was a source of great potential importance. The United States was not alien to this process, nor was the Great Britain. Throughout this period the movements of Germany, as well as those of Italy and Japan would be carefully followed by the intelligence services of both nations. In August 1937, the Foreign Office was notified that German and Italian agents were having an active participation in Mexico, even suggesting that the conflict in the oil industry was being funded with money from these nations. A letter written by Baron Von Collenberg, Minister Plenipotentiary of Germany to Mexico, was intercepted by the British Consulate. The letter was addressed to Manuel Santillán, General Director General of the National Petroleum Administration, with intentions of establishing a commercial agreement between Mexico and Germany. The Germans were interested in buying 100,000 barrels of oil type Panuco. (Paz 91, Schuler 72)

=== Mexican oil expropriation ===
In 1938, president Lázaro Cárdenas sided with oil workers striking against foreign-owned oil companies for an increase in pay and social services. On March 18, 1938 citing the 27th article of the 1917 constitution, President Lázaro Cárdenas embarked on the state-expropriation of all resources and facilities, nationalizing the United States and Anglo –Dutch operating companies, creating PEMEX. In retaliation, many foreign governments closed their markets to Mexican oil. In spite of the boycott, PEMEX developed into one of the largest oil companies in the world and helped Mexico become the fifth-largest oil exporter in the world.

== Governor of Tlaxcala ==
He was Governor of Tlaxcala, from January 15, 1941, to October 4, 1944, and was forced to resign as governor because he tried to oppose the national Institutional Revolutionary Party (PRM Party of the Mexican Revolution) leadership. During his tenure only Tlaxcala was the only state in Mexico that improved socioeconomic development and reach an income level proportionate to its population (Ai Cap 206). He reassumed the direction National Geological Institute from February 1 to May 31 of 1945 (Gómez-Caballero 167). He was president of the Sociedad Geológica en México from 1946 to 1947.

He died in Mexico City, October 12, 1982.

== Manuel Santillán's Publications ==
- El Cerro de Mercado, Durango: por una comisión del Instituto geológico de México, formada por los señores: Ingeniero de minas Leopoldo Salazar Salinas ... Pedro Gonzalez ... Manuel Santillán ... [y] Antonio Acevedo; petrógrafo, A.R. Martínez Quintero. México, Talleres graficos "La Helvetia": 1923.
- "Informe preliminar de varias zonas mineralizadas de la parte central del Estado de Guerrero." México, Departamento de exploraciones y estudios geológicos, Folleto de divulgación 15 (Oct. 1925).
- " Informe preliminar de varias zonas mineralizadas de la parte norte y noroeste del Estado de Guerrero." México, Departamento de exploraciones y estudios geológicos, Folleto de divulgación 18 (May 1926).
- " Estudio preliminar de las zonas mineralizadas que se encuentran a uno y otro lado de la carretera en proyecto entre Durango, Durango, y Mazatlán, Sinaloa." México, Departamento de exploraciones y estudios geológicos, Folleto de divulgacion 24 (Feb. 1927).
- "Geología minera de la región comprendida entre Durango, Dgo., y Mazatlán, Sin., a uno y otro lado de la carretera en proyecto entre esas ciudades." Boletín del Instituto Geologico de México (1929): 1-46.
- "Geologia minera de las regiones norte, noroeste y central del Estado de Guerrero." Boletín del Instituto Geológico de México (1929): 47-102.
- Geología de la región comprendida entre Durango. México: Talleres gráficos de la nación, 1929.
- "Arcillas y arepas en Cerro Blanco, Tlaxcala, y sus alrededores." Anales del Instituto Geológico de México (1930): 83-95.
- and Barrera, Tomas. Las posibilidades petrolíferas en la costa occidental de la Baja California, entre los paralelos 30 y 32 de latitud norte. Anales del Instituto Geólogico de México (1930): 1-37.
- "El criadero de yeso de Apipilulco, Estado de Guerrero." Anales del Instituto Geologico de México 28 (1930): 147-151.
- "Estudio geologico sobre el mineral de Pachuca." Boletín Minero [México] 2 (Feb. 1931): 29-41.
- "Informe geologico relativo al mineral de Huitzuco, Guerrero." Boletín Minero [México], 6 (Jul. 1931) : 1-8.
- Carta geológico-minera del Estado de Durango por Manuel Santillán.
- Mexico: UNAM, Instituto de Geología, 1932.
- and González, Enrique M. Anuario del Instituto de Geología 1932. México, Universidad Nacional Autónoma de México. Instituto de Geología, Geofísica y Geodesia : Editorial "Cvltvra", 1933-
- "Cooper Resources of the World." Sixteenth International Geological Congress, Washington D. C. (1933): 386-387.
- Carta geológico-minera del Estado de Durango. [Map] México: Talleres gráficos de la Nación : Nacional de México, Instituto de Geología, 1936.
- "El cobre en Mexico." Report of the ... Session - International Geological Congress (1935): 379-406.
- "Berilo y berilio en México." Report of the ... Session - International Geological Congress Washington D. C. 2.62 (1936): 1091-1097.
- "Algunas investigaciones sobre platino en México" Report of the ... Session - International Geological Congress Washington D. C. 2.62 (1936): 1110-1111.
- Carta geológico-minera del estado de Durango. Instituto de geológico. Cartas geológicas y geológico-mineras de la República mexicana. No. 2. México, Talleres Gráficos de la nación, 1936.
- "Developpement et importance de la geologie appliquee au Mexique." Congres International, des Mines, de la. Metallurgie, et de la Geologie Appliquee - Paris, 20-26 octobre 1935. 2 (1936): 1035-1043.
- "Synopsis of the geology of Mexico." Oil Weekly 81.2 (Mar. 1936): 35-37.
- "Synopsis of the Geology of Mexico." Bulletin of the American Association of Petroleum Geologists 20.4 (Apr. 1936): 394-402.
- Instituto Geológico de México. Carta geológica de la República Mexicana / Instituto Geológico de Mexico, Director Ing. Manuel Santillán.
- Mexico : Instituto geológico de México, 1937.
- El Instituto Geológico como dependencia de la Universidad Nacional de México. México: Universidad Nacional de México, Instituto de Geología, 1940.
- Informe del C. Ing. Manuel Santillán, gobernador constitucional del estado, rendido ante el H. Congreso Local el día 1o. de abril de 1944 con motivo del tercer año de su administración gubernamental. Tlaxcala, Tlax.: Talleres Gráficas del Estado, 1944.
- Estudio para el aprovechamiento industrial de los bosques en la Cuenca del Tepalcatepec y estado que guardan las comunidades indigenas de Michoacán. Uruapan, México: Comisión del Tepalcatepec, 1951.
- Antecedentes y bases para la organización de la empresa que se encargará de instalar la fábrica para la producción de celulosa y papel en las inmediaciones de Ziracuaretiro, Mich. México: Ed. e Impr. Beatriz de Silva, 1953.

== See also ==
- List of geologists
