= Carmen Cisneros =

Mexican physicist

María del Carmen Cisneros Gudiño is a Mexican physicist specializing in experimental atomic, molecular, and optical physics and especially known for her work on molecule–ion collisions. She is retired from the National Autonomous University of Mexico (UNAM).

Cisneros is originally from Mexico City. She entered UNAM as an undergraduate physics student, and completed her Ph.D. there in 1976, based on research at the Oak Ridge National Laboratory, and then founded a laboratory for experimental atomic physics in the UNAM institute of physics. She helped found UNAM's Institute of Physical Sciences at the Cuernavaca campus of UNAM, where she has been an affiliate since 1985. Cisneros was president of the Sociedad Mexicana de Física for 1997–1998, and editor of the Revista Mexicana de Física from 2004 to 2010. She has served as president of the Federation of Latin American Physical Societies, and vice president of the International Union of Pure and Applied Physics.

Cisneros was elected as a Fellow of the American Physical Society (APS) in 1996, after a nomination from the APS Division of Atomic, Molecular & Optical Physics, "for "her contributions to the field of molecular-ion collisional dissociation, particularly in fundamental hydrogenic systems, and for her efforts in international science and the development of AMO physics in Mexico". She is a member of the Mexican Academy of Sciences.
