= Monterrey Tech bombing =

Letter bombing in Monterrey, Mexico in 2011

- Location: Atizapán de Zaragoza, Mexico
- Date: August 8, 2011; 10:30 a.m.
- Target: Monterrey Institute of Technology and Higher Education
- Attack type: School bombing
- Weapon: Homemade bomb
- Deaths: 0
- Injuries: 2
- Perpetrator: Individualistas Tendiendo a lo Salvaje

The Monterrey Tech bombing occurred in August 2011 on the Atizapán de Zaragoza campus of the Monterrey Institute of Technology and Higher Education in Mexico. Two people, a professor and a guard, were injured; there were no fatalities.

== Incident ==
On August 8, 2011, an improvised explosive device detonated at the Monterrey Institute of Technology and Higher Education in Atizapán de Zaragoza, which caused minor injuries to two teachers and damage to the cubicle where they were located. He reported that the homemade package was addressed to a teacher, who was given by a gardener of the institution. although they went out “for their own foot” to be moved to a hospital, reported Alfredo Castillo Cervantes, attorney of the State of Mexico, in a wireless interview. The authorities said artifact was made with gunpowder and a tube four centimeters in diameter by 30 in length. Meanwhile, around noon, classes were resumed in the campus, only the A1 building remains closed and the area next to it remains cordoned off, if students are receiving classes.

== Aftermath ==
Personnel of the Mexican Army, Attorney General for Justice of the State of Mexico and State Security Agents discovered that the device came with FedEx stamps and it was addressed to the academic. State of Mexico Governor Enrique Peña Nieto described the incident as an "isolated incident but serious." Castle pointed out that they will check the safety videos of the Tec CEM, although it claimed that the institute informed them that the cameras probably were not serving since they were in maintenance.

Tec CEM informed the following: "Dear students, today will suspend classes given an incident that we had. In a few moments, more details on this matter. Except two affected teachers, all our community is well. The activities were suspended during a period from 24 until 48 hours. Our affected partners are the teachers of Posgrados in Engineering and Sciences Dr. Alejandro Aceves and Dr. Armando Herrera. They are stable and out of danger".

The State Attorney of Mexico, Alfredo Castillo, said that a line of investigation was strengthened on the explosion of the artifact at the Tec de Monterrey in Atizapán, which accused the anarchist group "Individualistas Tendiendo a lo salvaje" of the incident. The attorney said the attackers were inspired by the acts of Ted Kaczynski, the so-called Unabomber.

=== Investigations ===
The bomb was of home-making manufacture. The attorney pointed out that the workmanship is "rustic", but said that the bomb was a galvanized pipe of 30 centimeters and a battery of 9 volts. The bomb had a message, but the explosion burned it. Experts are attempting reconstruction of the message in order to be able to determine what the message was saying. Days later the eco-anarchist group Individualistas Tendiendo a lo Salvaje claimed responsibility for the attack, was released hours later, while the other teacher, whose condition is a little more delicate, has wounds to the chest.

The group it is proclaimed eco-extremist, accusing scientific and technological progress of being responsible for the devastation of the ecosystem s and the development of a civilization that moves away from nature. Taking a distorted version of the utopia of good savage of Rousseau represent an opposite to a hypercivilized society that, nourished by anarchist ideals, see in the annihilation of the agents of technological development a means to reach the ideal of primitive perfect man. Also they look the technological progress that they see as a process of degradation, they announced that they would carry out forceful acts against those they had identified as responsible (scientists, university professors, politicians, businessman) "without remorse", justifying the attack for its position about being against the development of nanotechnologies globally. One month later an improvised explosive was located and defused in the Faculty of Higher Studies (FES) in Cuautitlán Izcalli and the same group claimed responsibility for the incidents. Nobody was arrested, besides having a stagnation in the investigation since the beginning of 2014. Despite this, the group claim their members have performed several attacks around the world, the majority of them were then discarded by Individualistas Tendiendo a lo Salvaje. No terrorist activity is bound to this group in Mexico since 2013. In 2019, the president of Mexico announced the activity of this group is negligible.
