= José Cisneros =

American politician (born 1956)

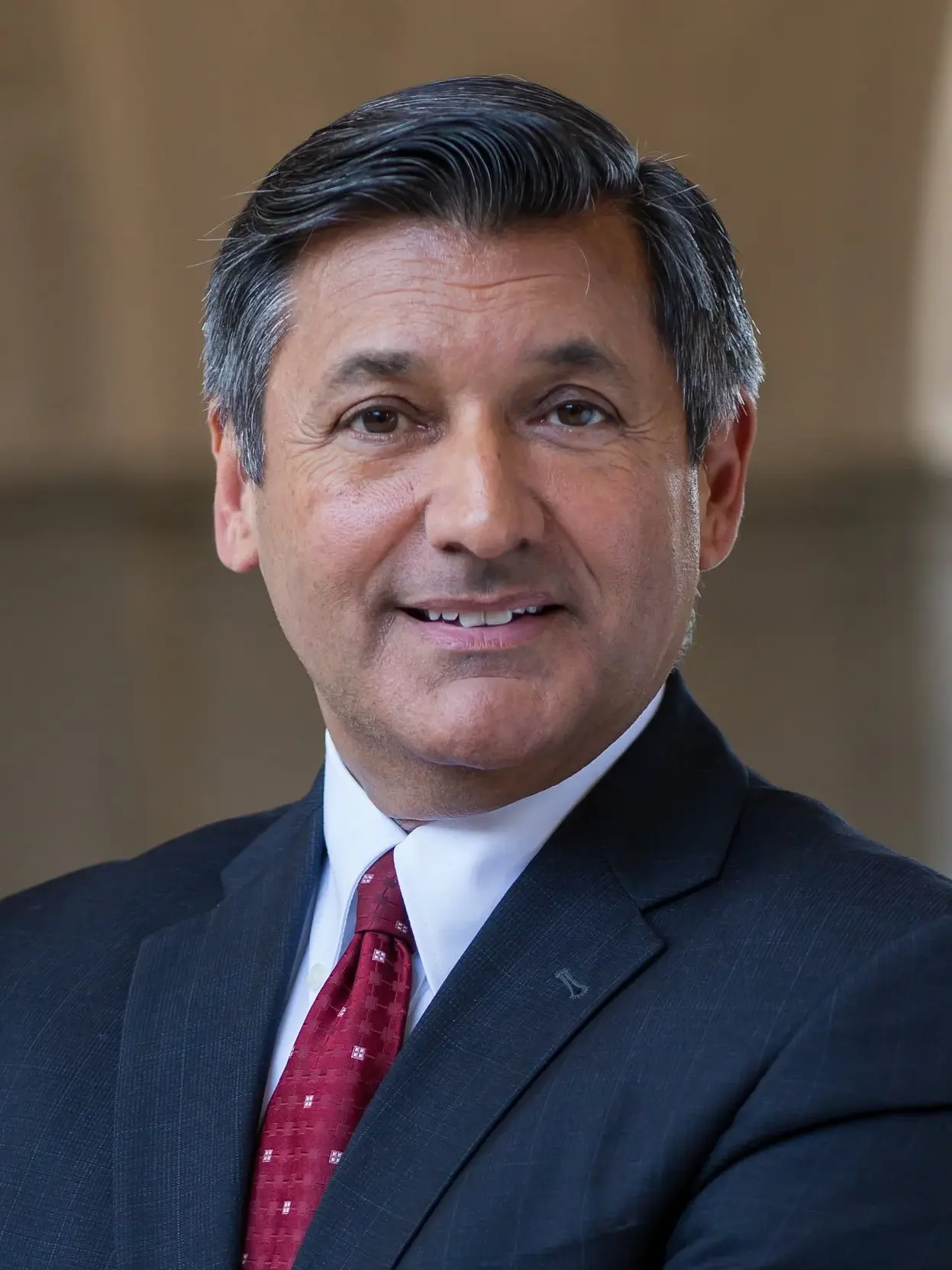
- Official portrait

San Francisco Treasurer
- Incumbent
- Assumed office 2004
- Preceded by: Susan Leal

Personal details
- Born: January 20, 1956 (age 70) Muskegon, Michigan, U.S.
- Party: Democratic
- Education: Bachelor's degree from MIT Sloan School of Management; MBA from Boston University
- Website: www.josecisneros.com

José Cisneros is the elected Treasurer of the City and County of San Francisco, California. He was appointed by Mayor Gavin Newsom in September 2004, defended his position in 2005 and was sworn in for his first full term in 2006. The City Treasurer serves as the City's banker and chief investment officer, managing all tax and revenue collection for San Francisco.

== Early life ==
José Cisneros received his Bachelor of Science from the MIT Sloan School of Management and studied for his MBA at Boston University. He is also a graduate of an intensive International Business Program at Stichting Nijenrode University in the Netherlands.

== Career ==
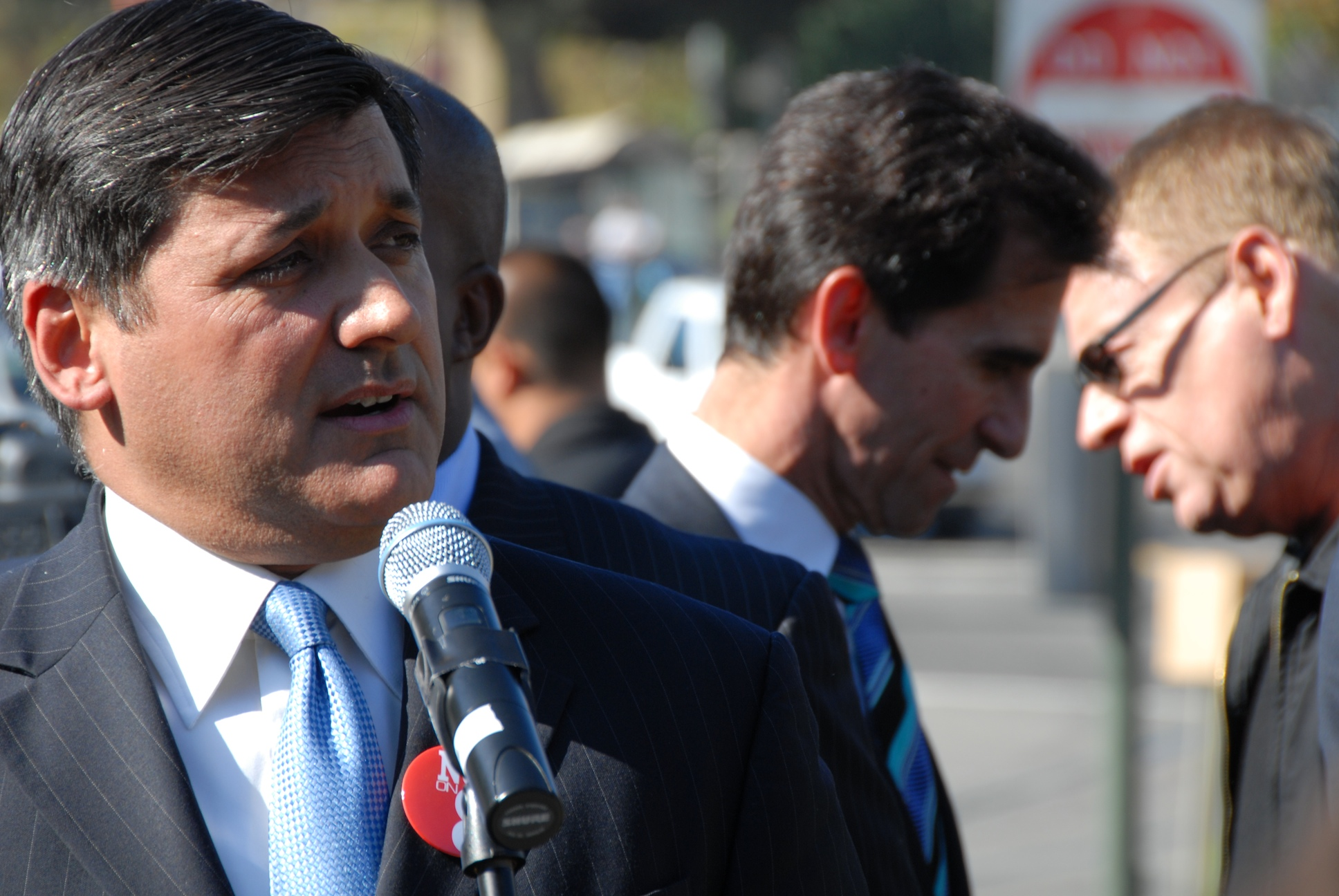
Cisneros, photographed in 2008

Treasurer Cisneros has a business background in the private sector, previously working for IBM Corporation and Lotus Development Corporation as a Senior International Product Manager. At Lotus, he was a pioneering member of its diversity committee – an effort that resulted in Lotus being the first major American corporation to provide domestic partner benefits. Prior to this he was the Assistant Vice President at Bank of Boston where he managed financial product portfolios valued at over $100 million.

Prior to his appointment as Treasurer, José served as Deputy General Manager of Capital Planning and External Affairs for the San Francisco Municipal Transportation Agency (MUNI). In this capacity, he managed MUNI's $7 billion capital program designed to repair, replace and enhance system assets – including the 3rd Street Rail extension to help continue to encourage economic improvement in Chinatown, Mission Bay and for the residents of Bay View and Hunters Point. Cisneros was also involved in designing MUNI's Clean Air Plan in response to Proposition I, which was passed in the March 2, 2004, San Francisco Consolidated Primary election.

A San Francisco resident for over fifteen years, Treasurer Cisneros has been active in the community including serving on the Equality California Institute board and the Alice B. Toklas LGBT Democratic Club board. Before working at MUNI full-time, while still at IBM, José was a volunteer member of the MTA Board of Directors and was instrumental in creating Proposition E, the MUNI Reform Charter Amendment. Previous to the MTA Board, José volunteered with the former Parking and Traffic Commission where he worked closely with the San Francisco Bicycle Coalition to help expand the number of dedicated bike lanes throughout the city.

He serves on the board of directors of the League of California Cities.

== Tenure as Treasurer ==
Portrait, photographed circa 2011

Treasurer Cisneros has worked to maximize the City's revenue through socially responsible investments and aggressive tax collection.

Identifying new sources of revenue and helping to close the City's budget gap are among Treasurer Cisneros’ top priorities. He has re-focused staff to provide the city with more tax collectors, increased the collection of delinquent taxes, and closed loopholes to ensure that everyone pays their fair share. In his first full fiscal year (2004–2005), these and other initiatives resulted in over $40 million more collected over the previous fiscal year, far exceeded targeted projections. With the additional funding, the legislative and executive branches of San Francisco were able to restore funding for healthcare, public safety and other important programs.

In 2013, Governing magazine recognized him as a Public Official of the Year.

=== Working Families Credit ===
José Cisneros believes that the Treasurer's Office has also made it a priority to promote financial justice and education. In January 2005, Treasurer Cisneros, along with Mayor Gavin Newsom launched the Working Families Credit (WFC) Program. The WFC featured an easy application process to help low-income families secure the federal Earned Income Tax Credit as well as a local match to the credit. Over 11,000 applications were submitted in the first year, double the number expected. These families have already received more than $15 million in federal money through this innovative public/private partnership that also provides each family an estimated 12% match from the City and its philanthropic partners in its first year. Since that time, the match has been shifted to a flat $100 per family.

=== Bank On San Francisco ===
On September 28, 2006, Treasurer Cisneros also pioneered a financial empowerment project called Bank on San Francisco. Well over 10% of Californians do not have bank accounts. Instead, too many take their paychecks to check cashing companies that charge up to 30% or more. One of Bank on San Francisco's top priorities will be to coordinate community-based leaders and local banks to provide low-income families with financial literacy education and free checking accounts to help them begin to achieve financial security.

In the first year, over 11,000 San Franciscans signed up for bank accounts. After the first year, the accounts had an average monthly balance of approximately $800. The program has become a national model, and Cisneros and the League of California Cities have worked to bring the program to other cities.

=== Kindergarten to College (K2C) savings accounts ===
Cisneros worked with the San Francisco school district to open college savings accounts for every kindergartner entering the public school system, with $50 in public funds deposited up front. For low-income children, the initial deposit is $100. To encourage parents to put money into the accounts, private funders match up to the first $100 that a family places in an account. Parents can raise another $100 if they deposit at least $10 per month for six consecutive months.

Political offices
Preceded by Susan Leal	San Francisco Treasurer; 2004–present	Succeeded by incumbent
