= Marisol Macías =

Mexican crime journalist and murder victim

- Marisol Macías Castañeda
- Born: c. 1972
- Died: 24 September 2011; Nuevo Laredo, Tamaulipas, Mexico
- Cause of death: Decapitation
- Other name: Maria Elizabeth Macías Castro
- Occupations: Managing editor and internet journalist
- Employer: Primera Hora
- Call sign: NenaDLaredo, or La Nena de Laredo
- Website: www.primerahora.com.mx

Marisol Macías Castañeda, also appearing as Maria Elizabeth Macías Castro in media reports and known for her online name "NenaDLaredo" or "La Nena De Laredo," (c. 1972 – 24 September 2011), was a Mexican editor-in-chief for Primera Hora in Nuevo Laredo, Tamaulipas, Mexico and posted information about drug activities online. Macías was secretly reporting using the internet site Nuevo Laredo en Vivo, or Nuevo Laredo Live, about drug cartels in her city. Los Zetas murdered her in a publicly visible and brutal slaying with a note near her body as a warning to others. Her murder is the first documented murder of a journalist by a drug cartel in retaliation for journalism that was posted on a social media site.

== Personal ==
Marisol Macías Castañeda was 39 years old when she was beheaded for her online postings. Nuevo Laredo en Vivo had become a site where people could announce to others about the dangers of drug violence and inform police. Macías was collaborating with others on the Nuevo Laredo en Vivo site, and after her murder, at least three others who have not been identified as journalists have been killed by Los Zetas drug cartel in retaliation for postings to the same social media site.

== Career ==
Marisol Macías Castañeda at one time worked for El Mañana newspaper. El Mañana was targeted in at least two attacks; one was in 2004 and the other in 2006. Macías was the editor-in-chief for the Primera Hora newspaper located in Nuevo Laredo, Mexico. Although she held an administrative post at the newspaper, she also wrote about drug trafficking for social media websites such as Twitter and Nuevo Laredo en Vivo. On these websites, she would write under a pseudonym "LaNenaDLaredo" or "The girl from Laredo".

== Death ==
Nuevo Laredo is in Mexico and shown relative to the capital Mexico City.

Marisol Macías was executed for exposing criminal groups in Mexico through social media. While writing on the social media websites, she targeted the criminal groups around her area, namely the Los Zetas drug cartel who are predominantly found in north and northeast Mexico and even in Laredo, Texas. She was decapitated, with her head on top of a well-known stone monument, Christopher Columbus Monument, in a busy, well-traveled section of the city. Beheading is a standard way that the drug cartels have killed its enemies. The rest of her body, a keyboard, cables, and disks, as well as the hand written note, were together on the lawn close to the monument. The Zetas left a note next to her body which translated reads, "OK Nuevo Laredo en Vivo and social media sites. I am Nena de Laredo and I'm here because of my (online) reports and yours.....For those who don't believe this happened to me because of my actions, for trusting in the Army and Marines...Thank you for your attention, La Nena de Laredo...ZZZZ." It is still unknown how the criminal group discovered her identity on the social websites.

== Context ==
An attack against social media users by Los Zetas was relatively new when the drug cartel murdered Macías. Just 12 days before Macías was murdered, two young social media users—a male and a female in their twenties—were found hanging under a bridge and disemboweled with a note nearby from Los Zetas warning against using the same website that Macías had also used. Since the media had been silenced by the drug cartels, people had begun to rely on information from social media and anonymous posts, and Los Zetas were suppressing that by killing on 13 September and then murdering the journalist Macías on 25 September. A moderator at the site with the pseudonym "Rascatripas," or "Belly Scratcher," was killed by beheading 9 November and left at the same spot as Macías.

== Impact ==
Ten other Mexican journalists had been killed in 2012 before Macías' murder. Macías was the fourth woman. According to the Committee to Protect Journalists, 25 out of the 59 journalists it has tracked as killed in Mexico since 1992 have been carried out as reprisals for their reporting. By Reporters Without Borders count, 80 journalists had been killed in the Mexican drug war. No other country in Latin America is as dangerous for journalists as Mexico. The Mexican drug cartels have scared journalists into a state of silence, and Marisol Macías had found a new tool to get the information out to the public. Most people on the social media sites used a pseudonym and Macías did the same, but it is not known how Los Zetas discovered the identify of those it killed for using the website.

== Reactions ==
Irina Bokova, the director-general of UNESCO, reacted to the violent killing of Macías, "...." Bokova saw the need for the security for the Mexican journalists.

The Tamaulipas attorney general's office expressed its condolences to the family and announced an investigation into the murder. The Committee to Protect Journalists said the incident showed that there was a need to train journalists in cyber security. The website Nuevo Laredo en Vivo created its own memorial by posting a banner with her user name and the message, "You'll always be present."

== See also ==
- List of journalists killed in the Mexican Drug War
- Timeline of the Mexican drug war
- 2012 Nuevo Laredo massacres, Attacks against the media
