= José Dionisio Cisneros =

Venezuelan revolutionary (1796–1847)

José Dionisio Cisneros (1796–1847) was a soldier, bandit and guerrilla during the Venezuelan War of Independence.
