= Mariano González Zarur =

Mexican politician

Governor of Tlaxcala
- In office 15 January 2011 – 31 December 2016
- Preceded by: Héctor Ortiz Ortiz
- Succeeded by: Marco Antonio Mena Rodríguez

President of the National Conference of Governors
- In office 26 February 2015 – 8 July 2015
- Preceded by: Jorge Herrera Caldera
- Succeeded by: Eruviel Ávila Villegas

Municipal president of Apizaco
- In office 1989–1992
- Preceded by: Jorge Javier Ramírez Lozano
- Succeeded by: Ramón Hernández Márquez

Personal details
- Born: 3 April 1949 (age 76) Apizaco, Tlaxcala, Mexico
- Party: PRI

Mariano González Zarur (born 3 April 1949) is a Mexican politician affiliated with the Institutional Revolutionary Party who was Governor of Tlaxcala, 2011-2016. As of 2014 he served as Senator of the LVIII and LIX Legislatures of the Mexican Congress representing Tlaxcala and as Deputy of the LX Legislature.

Preceded by Héctor Ortiz Ortiz	Governor of Tlaxcala; 2011 — 2016	Succeeded by Marco Antonio Mena Rodríguez
