= Héctor Ortiz Ortiz =

Mexican lawyer and politician

Governor of Tlaxcala
- In office 15 January 2005 – 14 January 2011
- Preceded by: Alfonso Sánchez Anaya
- Succeeded by: Mariano González Zarur

Personal details
- Born: 28 July 1950 (age 76) Oaxaca de Juárez, Oaxaca
- Party: National Action Party
- Other political affiliations: Institutional Revolutionary Party
- Spouse: Guadalupe Lozano Tovar

Héctor Israel Ortiz Ortiz (born 28 July 1950) is a Mexican lawyer and politician who served as Governor of Tlaxcala from 2005 to 2011.

== Professional career ==
Héctor Ortiz was born in the city of Oaxaca in 1950. He holds a bachelor's degree in law and has been a professor of law at the Autonomous University of Tlaxcala (UAT) since 1974. Ortiz also served as Rector of the UAT from 1983 to 1987 and again from 1999 to 2000. From 1990 to 1991 he served as Secretary of Education of the State of Tlaxcala. He served in the lower house of Congress during its 55th session (1991–1994, for Tlaxcala's first district) and 58th session (2000–2001, for Tlaxcala's second district). In 2002 he was elected mayor of Tlaxcala.

Ortiz joined the Institutional Revolutionary Party (PRI) in 1967 and was an active member until 2004, when he resigned from the PRI after losing the party's internal bid for the governorship of Tlaxcala. He then accepted the National Action Party (PAN) invitation to run for the governorship as the PAN candidate; he won the election held on 14 November 2004 and took office on 14 January 2005.

== See also ==
- List of Mexican state governors

Preceded by Alfonso Sánchez Anaya	Governor of Tlaxcala; 2005 — Present	Succeeded by Mariano González Zarur
