= Governor of Tlaxcala =

Governor of Mexican state

- Incumbent; Lorena Cuéllar Cisneros since August 31, 2021
- Term length: Six years, non-renewable

The governor of Tlaxcala is the position representing the complete executive power of the government of the Mexican state of Tlaxcala, per the Political Constitution of the Free and Sovereign State of Tlaxcala.

The governor is elected for a period of six years, and cannot be re-elected for any reason. The term of office begins on January 15 and ends on January 14, six years later. Elections are held 1 year prior to presidential elections.

To be elected, the candidate must be a natural-born citizen of Mexico, at least 30 years of age, and a resident of Tlaxcala for at least 5 years prior to the election.

== Governors of the Free and Sovereign State of Tlaxcala ==
Source: World Statesmen

- 30 Sep 1866 – 11 Mar 1867 Antonio Rodríguez Bocardo (in opposition to 27 Nov 1866)
- 11 Mar 1867 – 17 Apr 1872 Miguel Lira y Ortega (1st time) (b. 1827 – d. 1882)
- 18 Apr 1872 – 9 Aug 1872 Pedro Pérez Lira (1st time)
- 9 Aug 1872 – 30 Sep 1872 Francisco Paz
- 30 Sep 1872 – 14 Jan 1876 Melquíades Carbajal
- 14 Jan 1876 – 15 Jan 1876 José Manuel Saldaña (4th time)
- 15 Jan 1876 – 20 Jan 1876 Miguel Sevilla
- 20 Jan 1876 – 22 Mar 1876 Pedro Pérez Lira (2nd time)
- 22 Mar 1876 – 6 Feb 1877 Doroteo Léon
- 6 Feb 1877 – 20 Feb 1877 Vicente Marquez Galindo (interim)
- 20 Feb 1876 – 14 Mar 1877 Miguel Andrade Parraga (interim)
- 14 Mar 1877 – 15 Jan 1881 Miguel Lira y Ortega (2nd time) (s.a.)
- 15 Jan 1881 – 31 Jul 1884 José María Grajales
- 31 Jul 1884 – 15 Jan 1885 Teodoro Rivera
- 15 Jan 1885 – 30 May 1911 Próspero Cahuantzi
- 30 May 1911 – 7 Jun 1911 Diego L. Kennedy
- 7 Jun 1911 – 30 Aug 1911 Agustín Sánchez (1st time) (interim)
- 1 Sep 1911 – 30 Nov 1911 Ramón M. Maldonado (interim)
- 1 Dec 1911 – 14 Jan 1913 Antonio Hidalgo Sandoval
- 15 Jan 1913 – 3 Feb 1913 Agustín Sánchez (2nd time) (interim)
- 4 Feb 1913 – 1 Mar 1913 Agustín Maldonado
- 1 Mar 1913 – 17 Mar 1913 José Mariano Grajales
- 17 Mar 1913 – 15 May 1913 Alberto Yarza (Military)
- 15 May 1913 – 1914 Manuel Cuéllar Alarcón
- 15 Aug 1914 – 20 Aug 1914 Luis J. García
- 21 Aug 1914 – 26 Nov 1914 Máximo Rojas (1st time)
- 26 Nov 1914 – 15 Jan 1915 Alejo González
- 15 Jan 1915 – 16 May 1915 Máximo Rojas (2nd time) (Military)
- 16 May 1915 – 10 Jun 1916 Porfirio del Castillo (provisional) (Military)
- 10 Jul 1916 – 18 Apr 1917 Antonio M. Machorro (interim)
- 18 Apr 1917 – 1 Oct 1917 Daniel Ríos Zertuche (provisional)
- 1 Oct 1917 – 30 May 1918 Luis M. Hernandez (provisional)
- 31 May 1918 – 7 May 1920 Máximo Rojas (3rd time) (Military)
- 7 May 1920 – 5 Nov 1920 Ignacio Mendoza (1st time)
- 17 Nov 1920 – 30 Nov 1920 Octavio Hidalgo
- 1 Dec 1920 – 14 Jan 1921 Manuel R. Solís
- 15 Jan 1921 – 14 Jan 1925 Rafael Apango
- 15 Jan 1925 – 14 Jan 1929 Ignacio Mendoza (2nd time)
- 15 Jan 1929 – 5 Jan 1933 Adrián Vázquez Sánchez PRI
- 5 Jan 1933 – 15 Jan 1933 Moisés Rosalía García (interim) PRI
- 15 Jan 1933 – 1 Apr 1933 Mauro Angulo (1st time) (interim) PRI
- 1 Apr 1933 – 23 Dec 1933 Adolfo Bonilla (1st time) PRI
- 23 Dec 1933 – 14 Jun 1934 Tomás Sánchez Pérez (substitute) PRI
- (1934–1937): Adolfo Bonilla, National Revolutionary Party, PNR
- (1937–1940): Isidro Candia, PNR
- (1940–1941): Joaquín Cisneros Molina, Party of the Mexican Revolution, PRM
- (1941–1944): Manuel Santillán, PRM
- (1944–1945): Mauro Angulo, PRM
- (1945–1951): Rafael Avila Bretón, PRM
- (1951–1957): Felipe Mazarraza PRI
- (1957–1963): Joaquín Cisneros Molina PRI
- (1963–1969): Anselmo Cervantes PRI
- (1969–1970): Ignacio Bonilla Vázquez PRI
- (1970): Crisanto Cuéllar Abaroa PRI
- (1970–1975): Luciano Huerta Sánchez PRI
- (1975–1981): Emilio Sánchez Piedras PRI
- (1981–1987): Tulio Hernández Gómez PRI
- (1987–1992): Beatriz Paredes Rangel PRI
- (1992–1993): Samuel Quiróz de la Vega (interim)
- (1993–1999): José Antonio Álvarez Lima PRD
- (1999–2005): Alfonso Sánchez Anaya PRD
- (2005–2011): Héctor Ortiz Ortiz PAN
- (2011–2016): Mariano González Zarur PRI
- (2017–2021): Marco Antonio Mena Rodríguez PRI
- (2021–present: Lorena Cuéllar Cisneros MORENA

== See also ==
- Tlaxcala
