= Veracruz (city) =

- City and municipality
- Heroica Veracruz
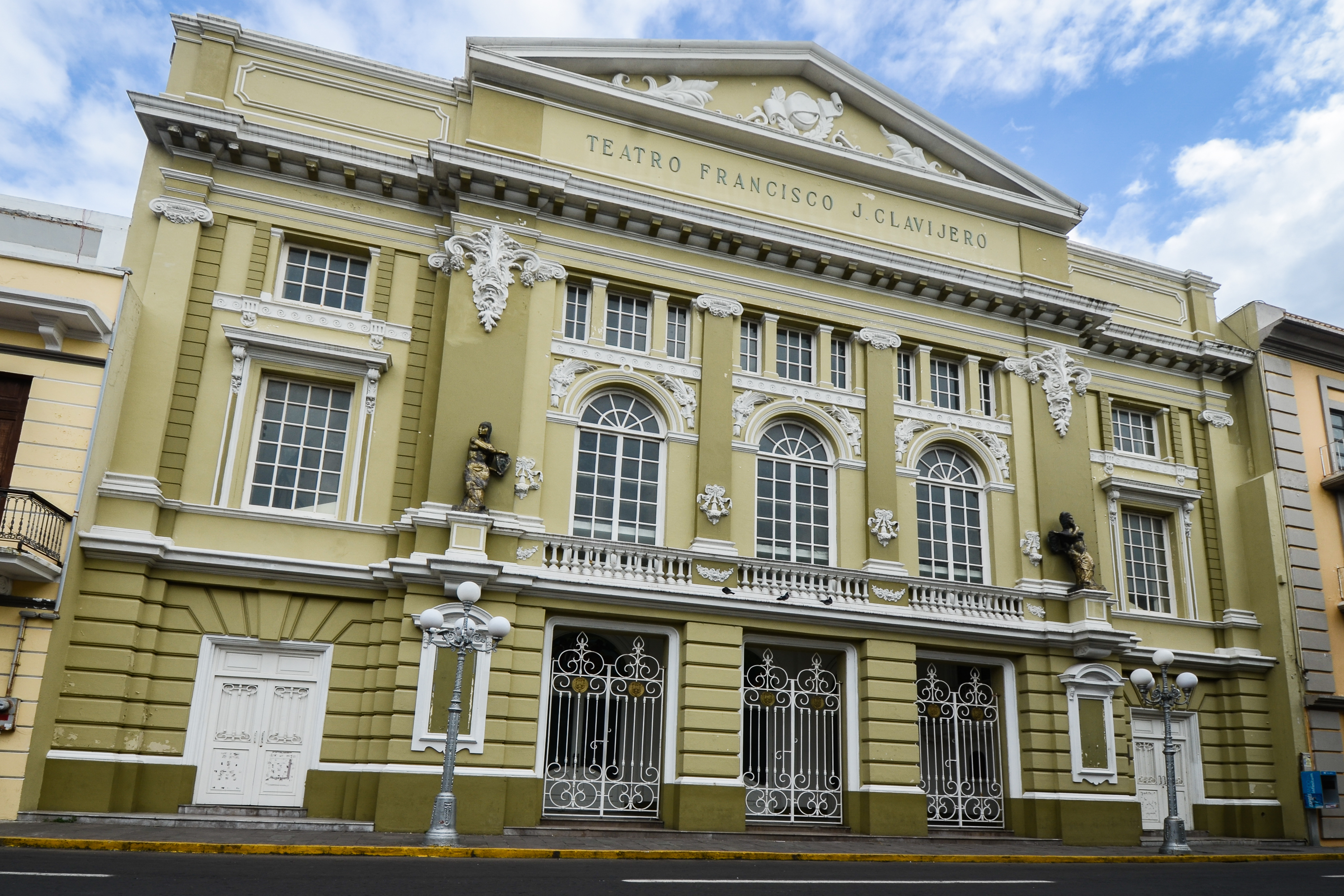
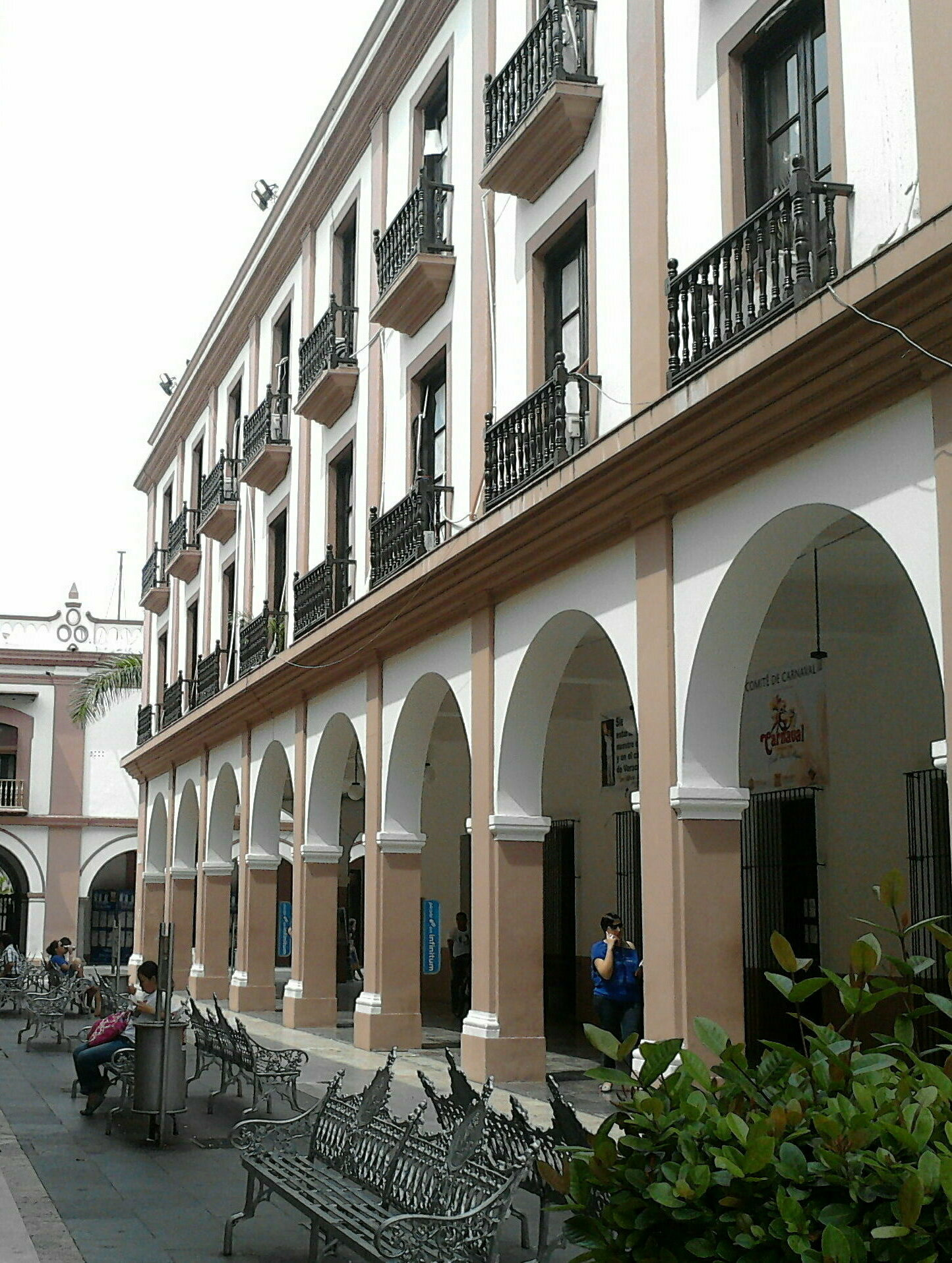
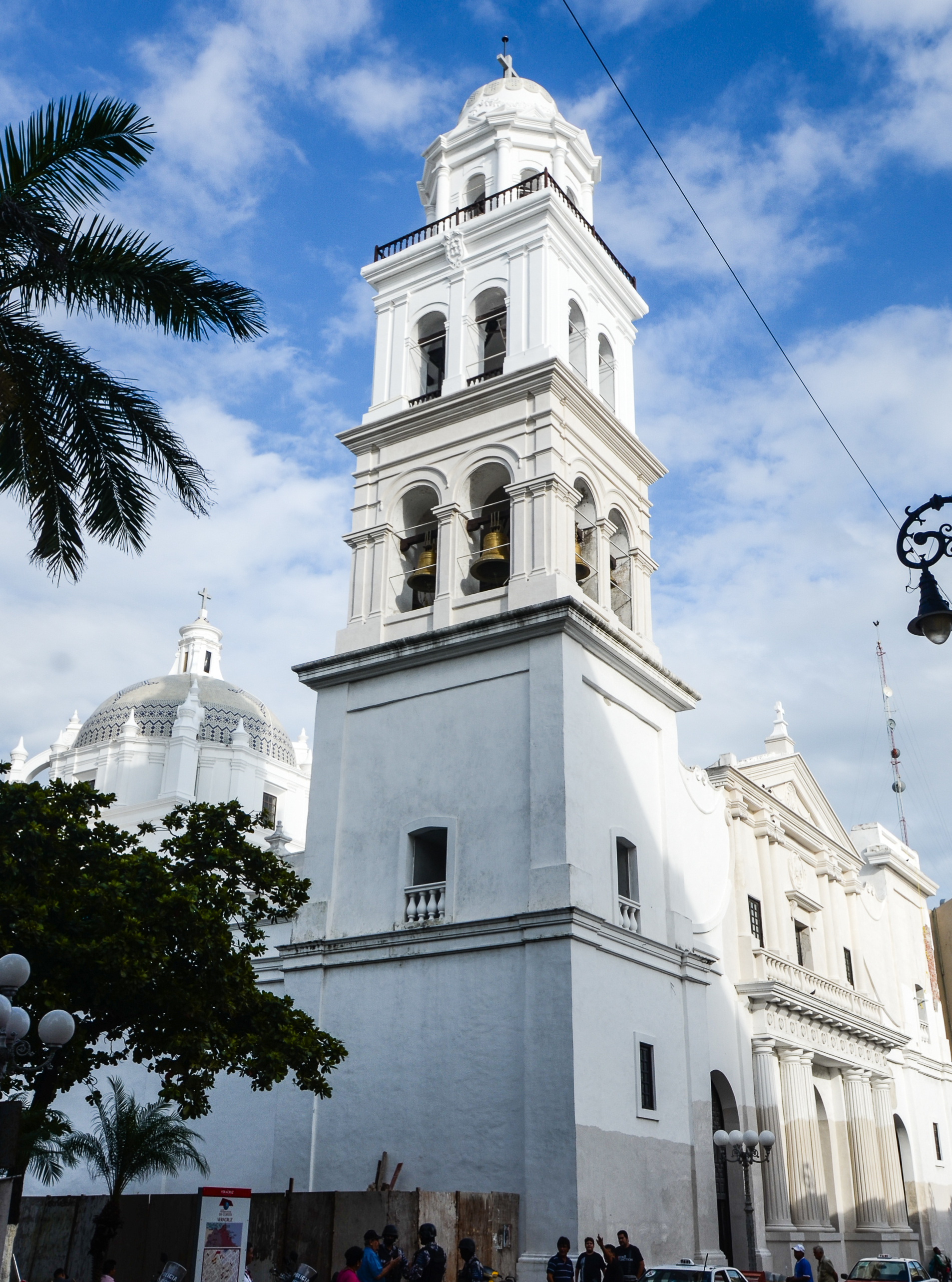
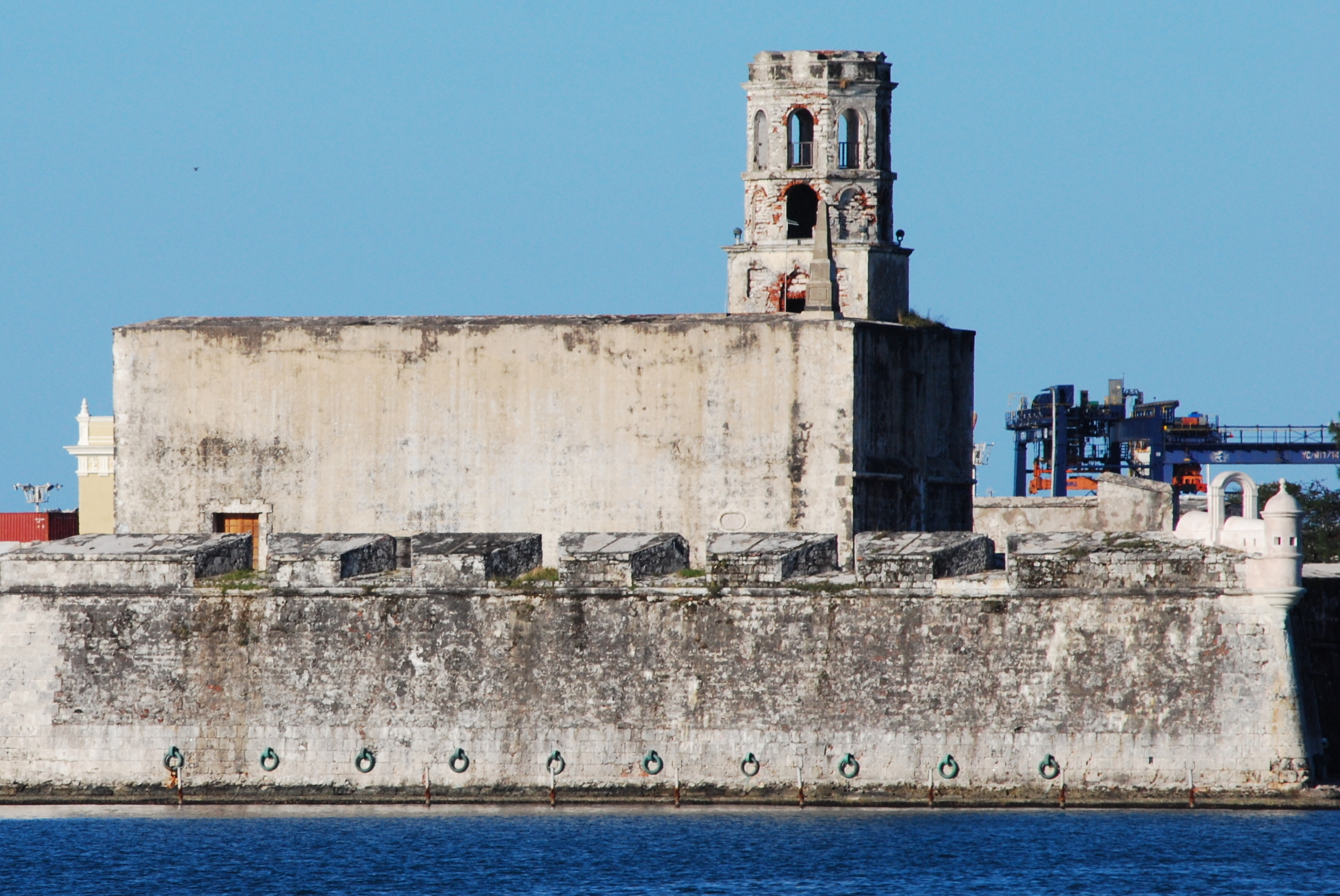
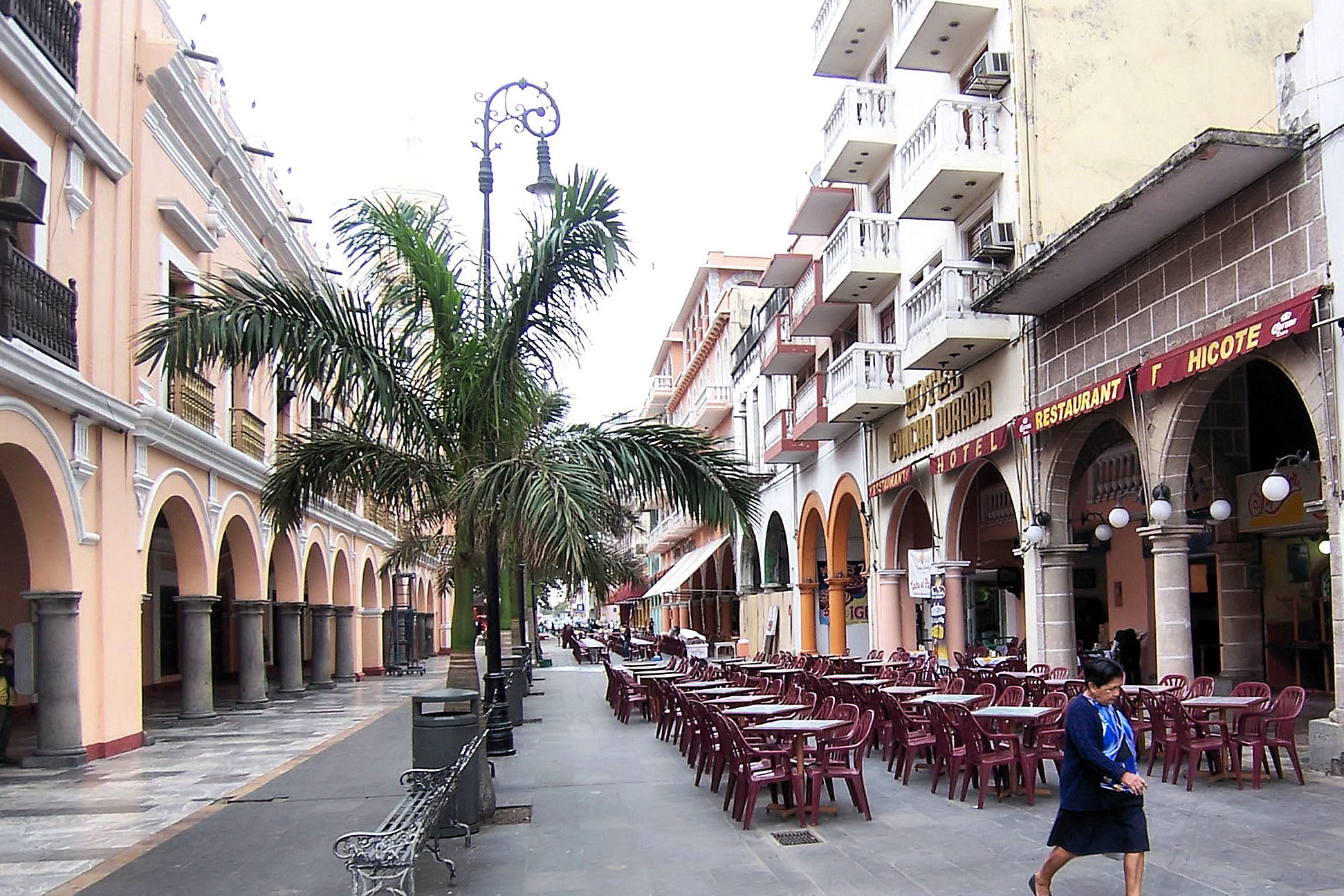
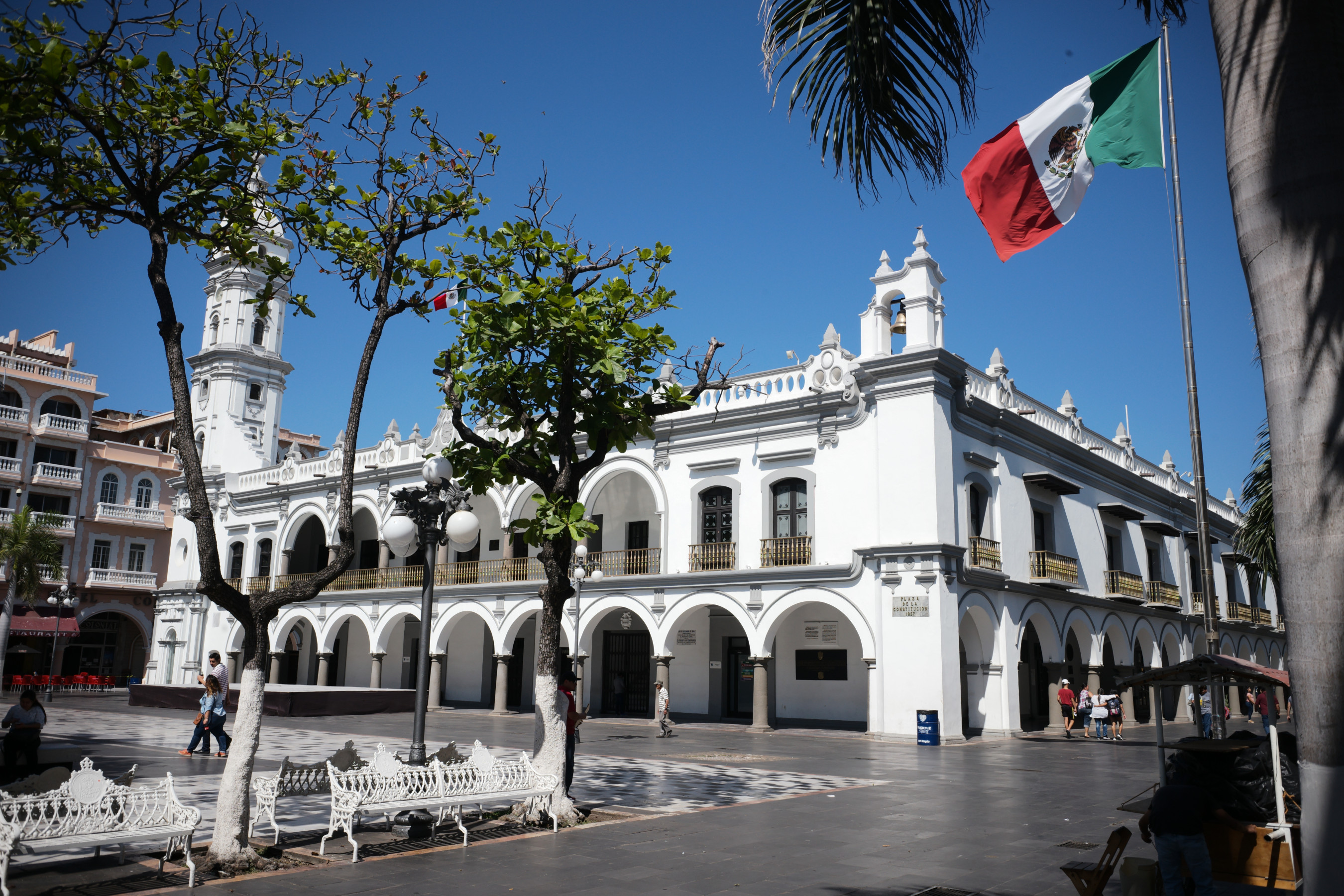
- Top: Clavijero Theatre; 2nd row: Portal de Miranda (left) and Veracruz Cathedral (right); 3rd row: Castle of San Juan de Ulúa (left) and Portales de Lerdo (right); Bottom: City hall of Veracruz

- Coat of arms

- Location within Veracruz Location within Mexico
- Coordinates: 19°11′25″N 96°09′12″W
- Country: Mexico
- State: Veracruz
- Region: Sotavento Region
- Established: 22 April 1519 (507 years ago)
- Founded as: Villa Rica de la Vera Cruz
- Founder: Hernán Cortés
- Named for: The True Cross

Government
  - Municipal President: Rosa Hernández Espejo (Morena)

Area
  - Land: 79 km^{2} (31 sq mi)
  - Metro: 1,641.6 km^{2} (633.8 sq mi)
- Elevation: 10 m (33 ft)

Population (2020)
  - Total: 537,952
  - Density: 6,700/km^{2} (17,300/sq mi)
  - Municipality: 607,209
  - Metro: 968,070

GDP (PPP, constant 2015 values)
  - Year: 2023
  - Total: $19.1 billion
  - Per capita: $20,000
- Time zone: UTC−6 (CST)
- Website: veracruzmunicipio.gob.mx

Veracruz (Latin American Spanish pronunciation: [beɾaˈkɾus]), also known as Heroica Veracruz, is a major port city and municipal seat for the surrounding municipality of Veracruz on the Gulf of Mexico and the most populous city in the Mexican state of Veracruz. The city is located along the coast in the central part of the state, 90 km (56 mi) southeast of the state capital Xalapa.

It is the most populous city in the state of Veracruz. Part of the city extends into the neighboring municipality of Boca del Río. At the 2020 census, Veracruz Municipality had a population of 607,209 inhabitants. The city of Veracruz had a population of 537,952 inhabitants, 405,952 in Veracruz municipality and 132,011 in Boca del Río municipality. Developed during Spanish colonization, Veracruz is Mexico's oldest, largest, and historically most significant port.

When the Spanish explorer Hernán Cortés arrived in what is now Mexican territory on 22 April 1519, he founded a city, which he named Villa Rica de la Vera Cruz, referring to the area's gold and dedicated to the "True Cross", because he landed on the Christian holy day of Good Friday, the day of the Crucifixion. It was the first Spanish settlement on the mainland of the Americas to receive a coat-of-arms. During the colonial period, this city had the largest mercantile class and was at times wealthier than the capital, Mexico City. Its wealth attracted the raids of 17th-century pirates, against which fortifications such as Fort San Juan de Ulúa were built. In the 19th and early 20th centuries, Veracruz was invaded on different occasions by France and the United States; in the aftermath of the 1914 Tampico Affair, US troops occupied the city for seven months. For much of the 20th century, the production of petroleum was most important for the state's economy but, in the latter 20th century and into the 21st, the port has re-emerged as the main economic engine. It has become the principal port for most of Mexico's imports and exports, especially for the automotive industry.

Veracruz has a blend of cultures, mostly indigenous, Spanish and Afro-Caribbean. The influence of these three is best seen in the food and music of the area, which has strong Spanish, Caribbean and African influences.

== Etymology ==
The name Veracruz (originally Vera Cruz), derives from the Latin Vera Crux (True Cross). Having established the settlement of Villa Rica (Rich Village) on Good Friday, 22 April 1519, Cortés dedicated the place to the True Cross as an offering.

== History ==
=== Viceroyalty of New Spain (1518–1821) ===
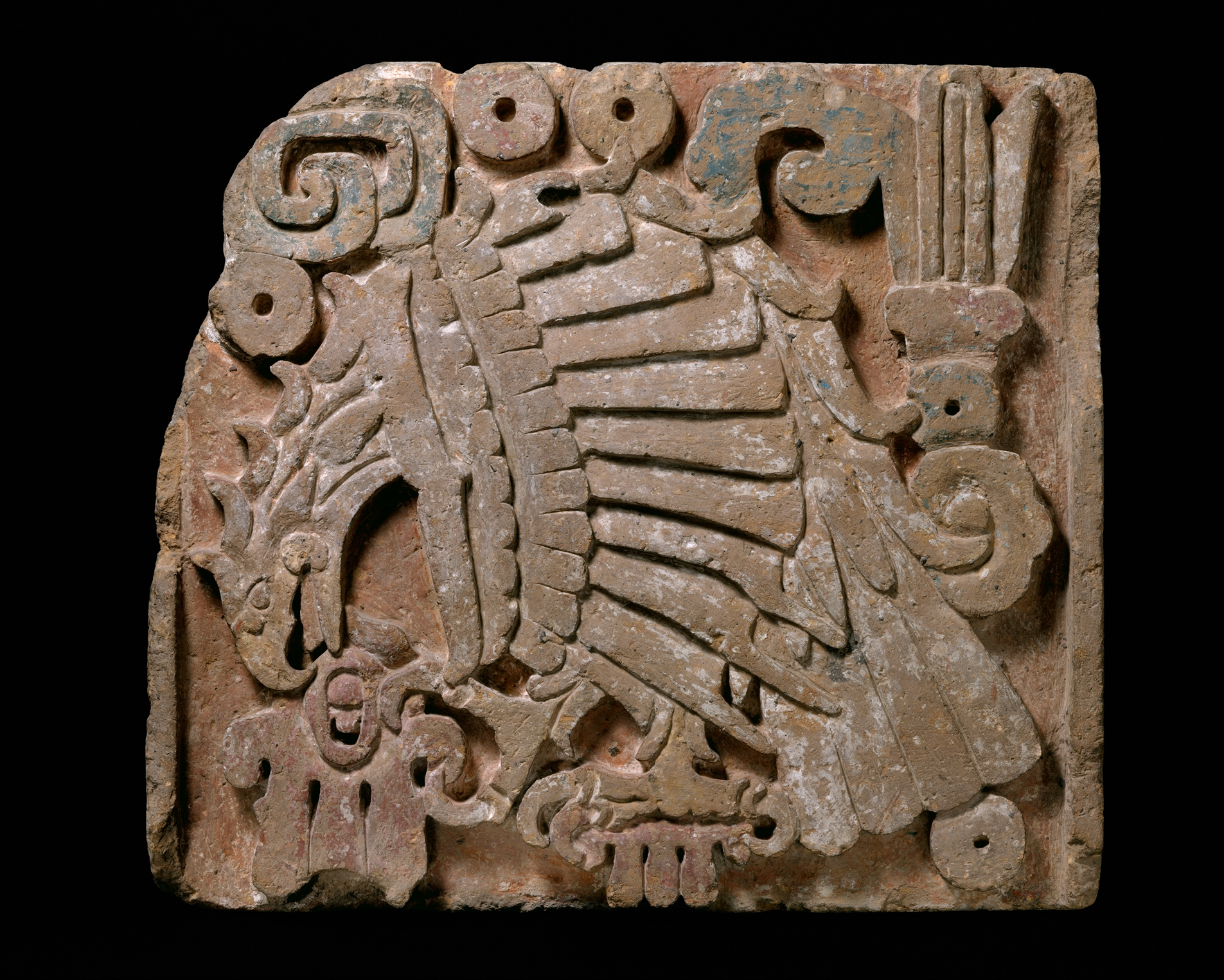
Toltec carving representing the Aztec Eagle, found in Veracruz, 10th–13th century. Metropolitan Museum of Art.

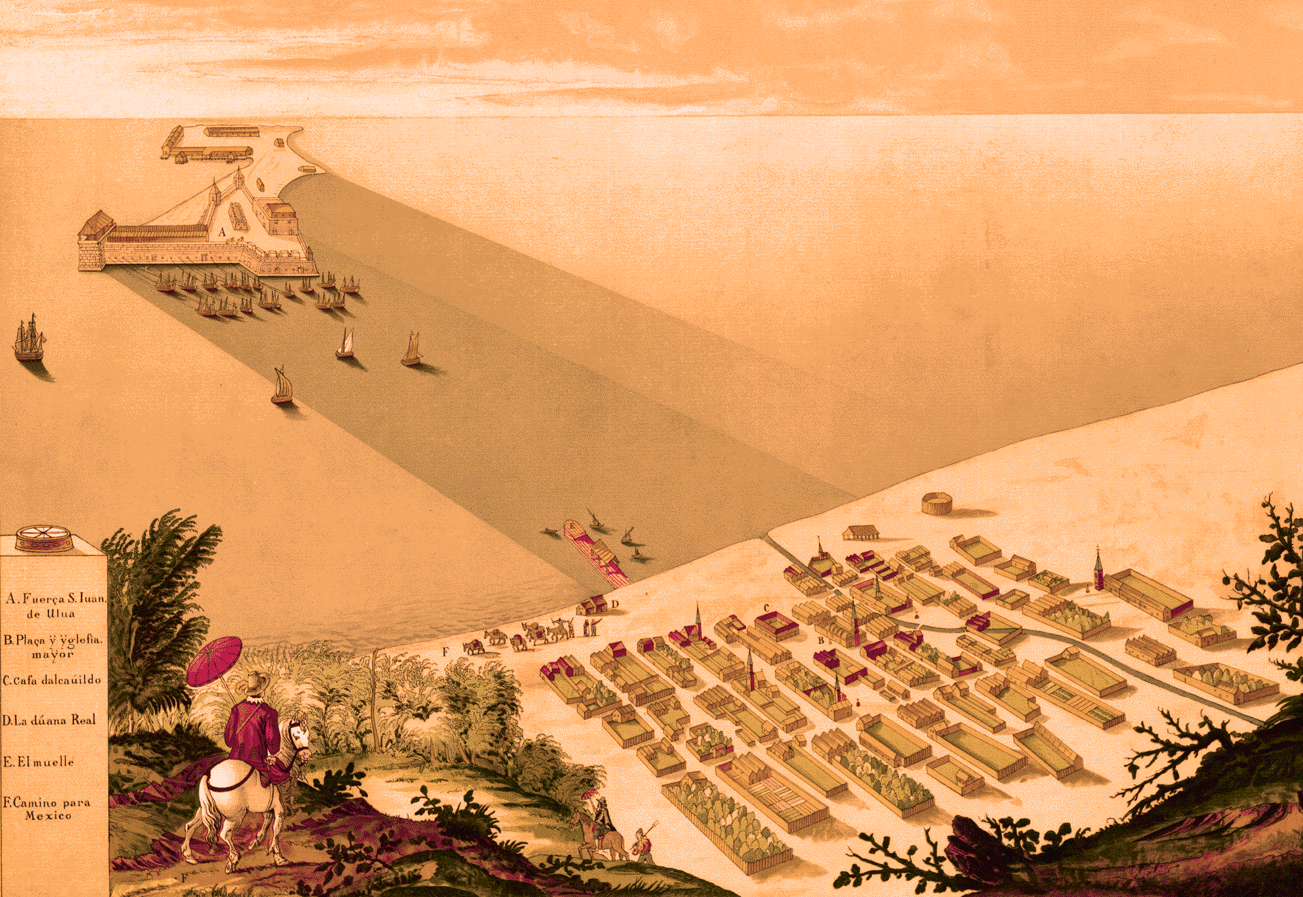
Depiction of Veracruz and the Castle of San Juan de Ulúa in 1615.

The Spanish captain Juan de Grijalva, along with Bernal Díaz del Castillo, first arrived in 1518 at the island later known as San Juan de Ulúa. The Spanish gave it that name because they landed on the Christian feast of John the Baptist (24 June), and in honor of the captain. De Ulúa is derived from the local name for the Aztecs, coluha or acolhua. The word for Aztec evolved into Ulúa.

While Veracruz itself was founded by Hernán Cortés who arrived in 1519, the area at the time was within the jurisdiction of Moctezuma II and his Aztec Empire. Cortés and his men landed at the shore opposite the island where Grijalva had moored, which has the pre-Hispanic name of Chalchihuecan. Cortés, Francisco de Montejo and Alonso Hernández Puertocarrero founded the settlement, naming it Villa Rica de la Vera Cruz. The name Villa Rica (rich village) referred to the gold that was found here and Vera Cruz (True Cross) was added because the Cortés expedition landed on Good Friday, a Christian holy day. When Cortés and his soldiers abolished the Aztec rulers and elected a Justicia Mayor and a Capitán General, they created the first city council on the American continent. The city was the first on mainland America to receive a European coat of arms, which was authorized by Carlos V in Valladolid, Spain, on 4 July 1523.

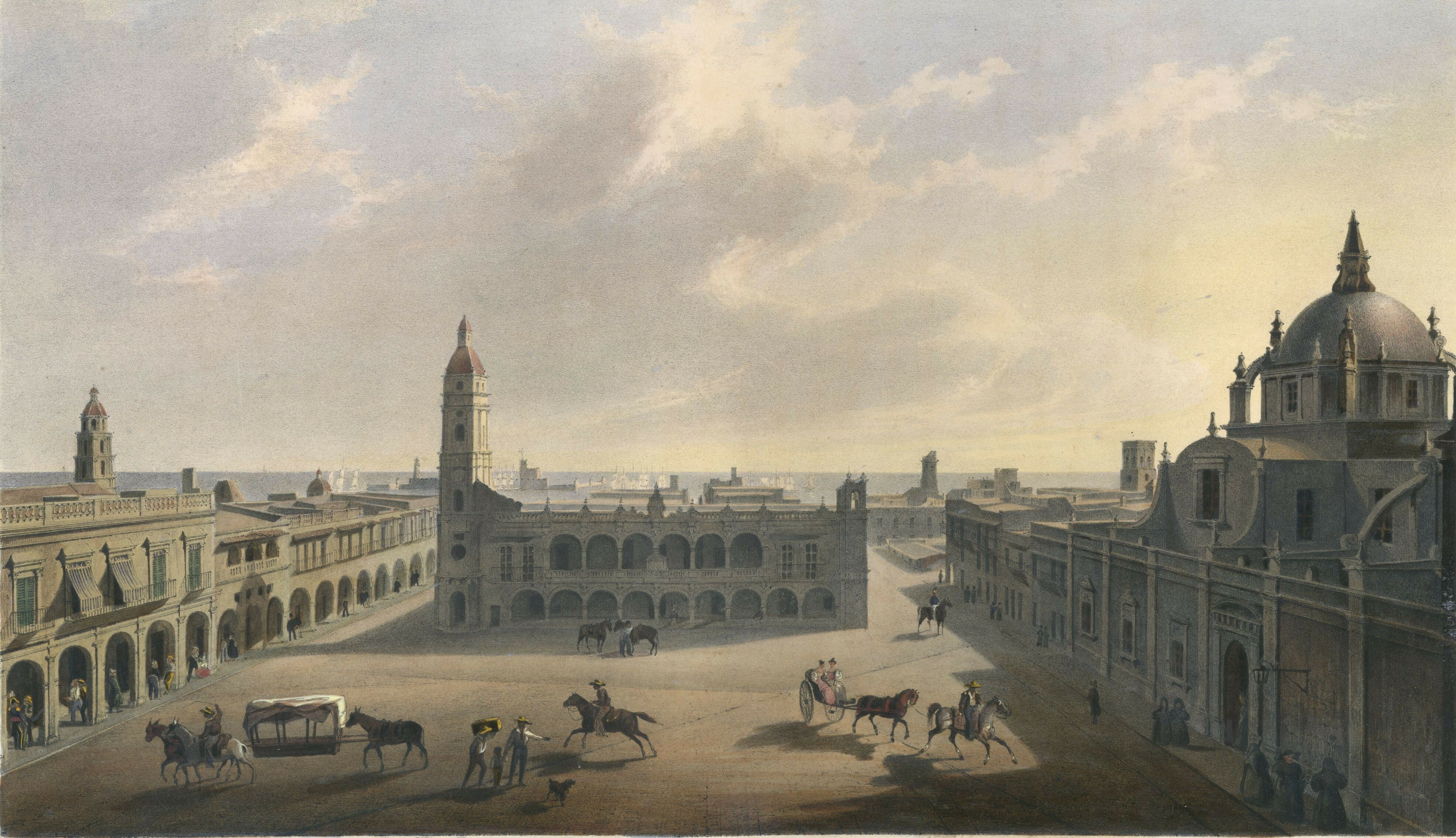
The Zócalo of Veracruz in 1836.

The original settlement was moved in 1525 to what is now known as Antigua, at the mouth of the Huitzilapan (or Antigua River) shortly thereafter. This separated the city from the port, as ships could not enter the shallow river. Ships continued to dock at San Juan de Ulúa, with small boats being used to ferry goods on and off the ships.

As in other parts of Mexico, the indigenous peoples suffered from epidemics of European infectious diseases, which decimated the population after contact. The Portuguese Empire began to import African slaves via the port of Veracruz. In the 16th century, the state had more slaves than any other in Mexico. Before the slave trade was abolished, Mexico had the second-highest population of African slaves in the Americas, following Brazil.

Veracruz was the most important port in New Spain, with a large wealthy merchant class that was more prosperous than that of Mexico City. Each of the two yearly voyages of the Spanish treasure fleet to and from Spain were to gather at Veracruz stevedores, muleteers, navigators, sailors, contractors, merchants and civil servants. In 1568 the Armada admiral Francisco Luján successfully ambushed a fleet of British privateers led by John Hawkins and Francis Drake whilst they were provisioning at Veracruz. By the end of the 16th century, the Spanish had constructed roads to link Veracruz with other cities such as Córdoba, Orizaba, Puebla, Xalapa and Perote. Their gold and silver were the principal exports.

This caused the city problems with pirates, prompting the construction of Fort San Juan de Ulúa on the island where Grijalva had landed in the mid-16th century. In 1600, when large-scale smuggling of goods took place to avoid customs officials, the Spanish Crown ordered the settlement returned to its original site to cut down on that traffic. Docks and an observation tower were constructed on the island to ensure that goods went through customs officials. Major public buildings were constructed at the beginning of the 17th century: the municipal palace, the monastery of Nuestra Señora de la Merced, and the Hospital de Nuestra Señora de Loreto. In 1618, a fire nearly reduced much of the city to ashes. In 1640, the Barlovento Armada was stationed here for additional defense against pirates. The pirates, led by Spain's rival nations, Nicholas van Hoorn, Laurens de Graaf and Michel de Grammont attacked Vera Cruz in 1683.

During the 18th century Veracruz's defence was improved with the construction of a wall around it (1790), bastions Baluarte de Santiago and gates, and San Juan de Ulua's renovation to today's appearance. The reason was to protect this valuable port after the threat of an invasion such as the siege of Havana (1762) by the British. The Spanish empire's talented military engineers were gathered in Veracruz to work on the New Spanish Gulf of Mexico's defence against the attack of Spain's enemies in a time when the Spanish Empire stretched from current Venezuela to Florida. Many of the buildings and institutions which form Veracruz's Historic Centre date from that time such as the cathedral (1731), the Military Hospital of San Carlos (1731) or modern water supply and sewerage systems.

In 1804 the Balmis Expedition arrived at Veracruz with the smallpox vaccine, which was from here transported to the whole of New Spain. The 19th century was marked by armed conflicts. During the Mexican War of Independence, Spain placed troops here to maintain Mexico City's sea link with Spain. In 1816, Antonio López de Santa Anna commanded royalist troops countering the insurgency. In 1820, insurgents took the city, despite Santa Anna's attempts to stop them. The last viceroy of New Spain, Juan O'Donojú, arrived here in 1821, where he signed the Treaty of Córdoba with Agustín de Iturbide at Fort San Juan de Ulúa. In 1823, Spanish troops remaining at Fort San Juan de Ulúa fired on the newly independent Mexican city of Veracruz. In 1825 the last Spanish troops left San Juan de Ulúa.

=== Mexico (since 1821) ===
The city's defense against the attack earned its first title of "Heroic City". During the Pastry War in 1837, the city mounted a defense against a French attack, and earned its second title of "Heroic City."

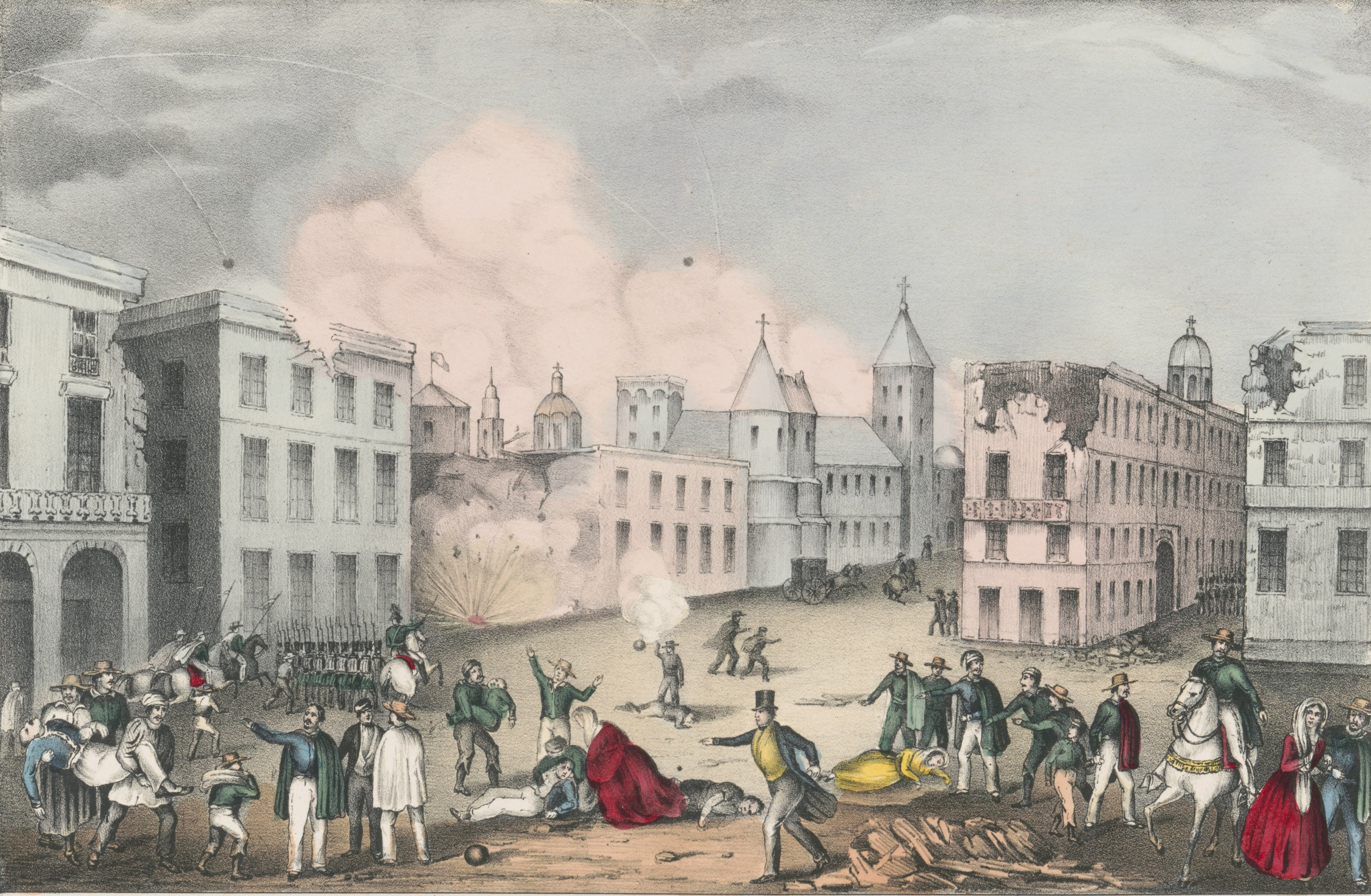
The 1847 Siege of Veracruz during the Mexican-American War

In 1847 during the Mexican–American War, United States forces invaded the city. It was defended by generals Juan Morales and José Juan de Landero. The siege continued with brisk firing until 27 March, by which time a considerable breach had been made in the wall surrounding the city. Upon this General Morales, who was Governor of both the city and of San Juan de Ulúa, commenced a correspondence with General Winfield Scott looking to the surrender of the town, forts and garrison. On the 29th Vera Cruz and San Juan de Ulúa were occupied by Scott's army. About five thousand prisoners and four hundred pieces of artillery, in addition to large amounts of small arms and ammunition, fell into the hands of the victorious invaders. The casualties on the US side during the siege amounted to sixty-four officers and men, killed and wounded.

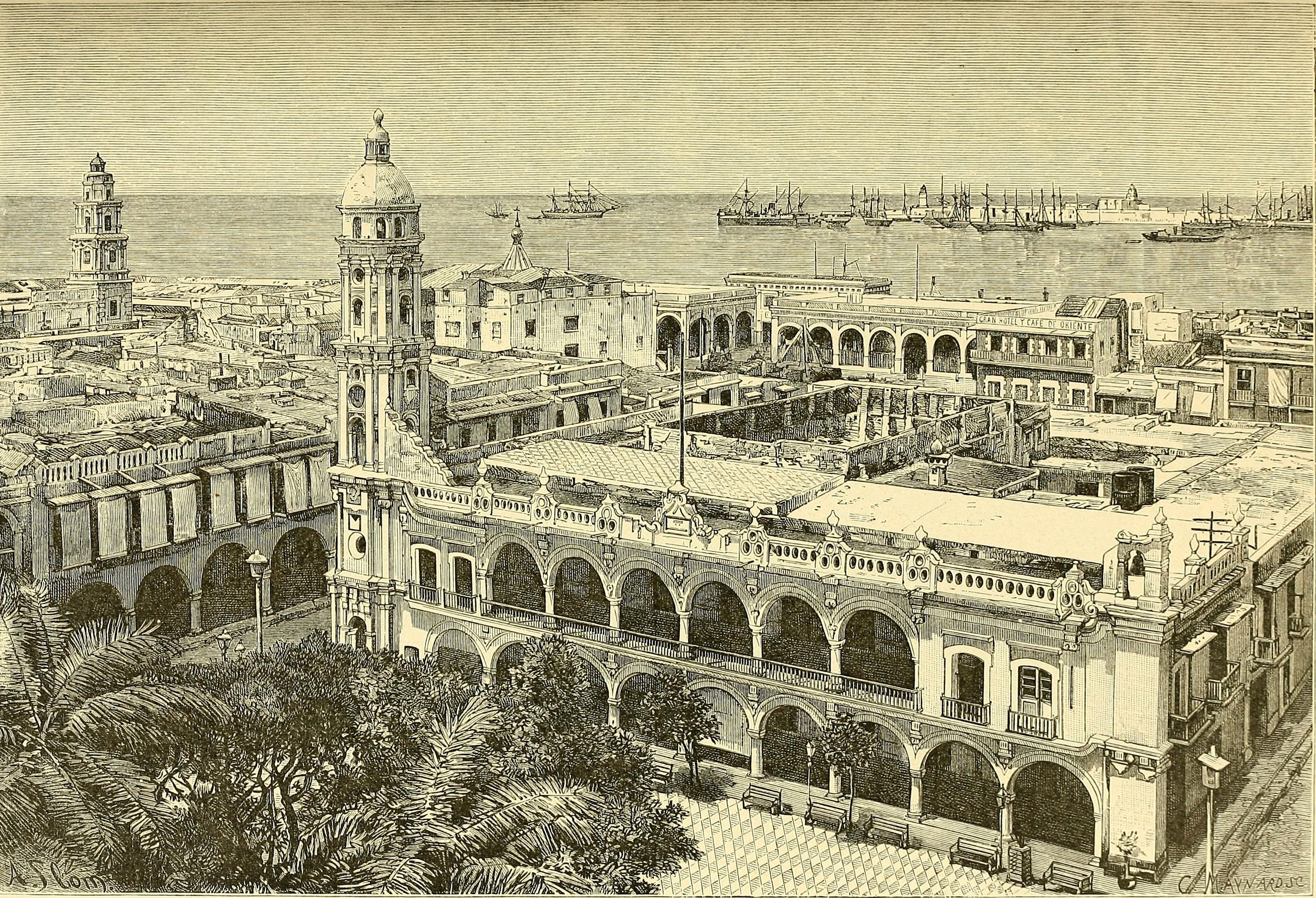
Veracruz city center in 1876

Ten years later, civil war between liberals and conservatives forced Benito Juárez's government to flee Mexico City. Juárez went to Veracruz and governed from there in 1857. In 1861 Spain sent its troops to occupy the port in an effort to secure payment of debts, which Juárez had suspended. French military forces accompanied them to prepare for Maximiliano I and occupied the city when the emperor and his wife Carlota of Belgium arrived in 1864.

=== 20th century ===
The conflicts and damaged trade relations with Europe took its toll on the port of Veracruz. By 1902, the port facilities had deteriorated, and it was considered one of the most dangerous on the American coast. President Porfirio Díaz contracted with foreign enterprises to modernize the port's infrastructure.

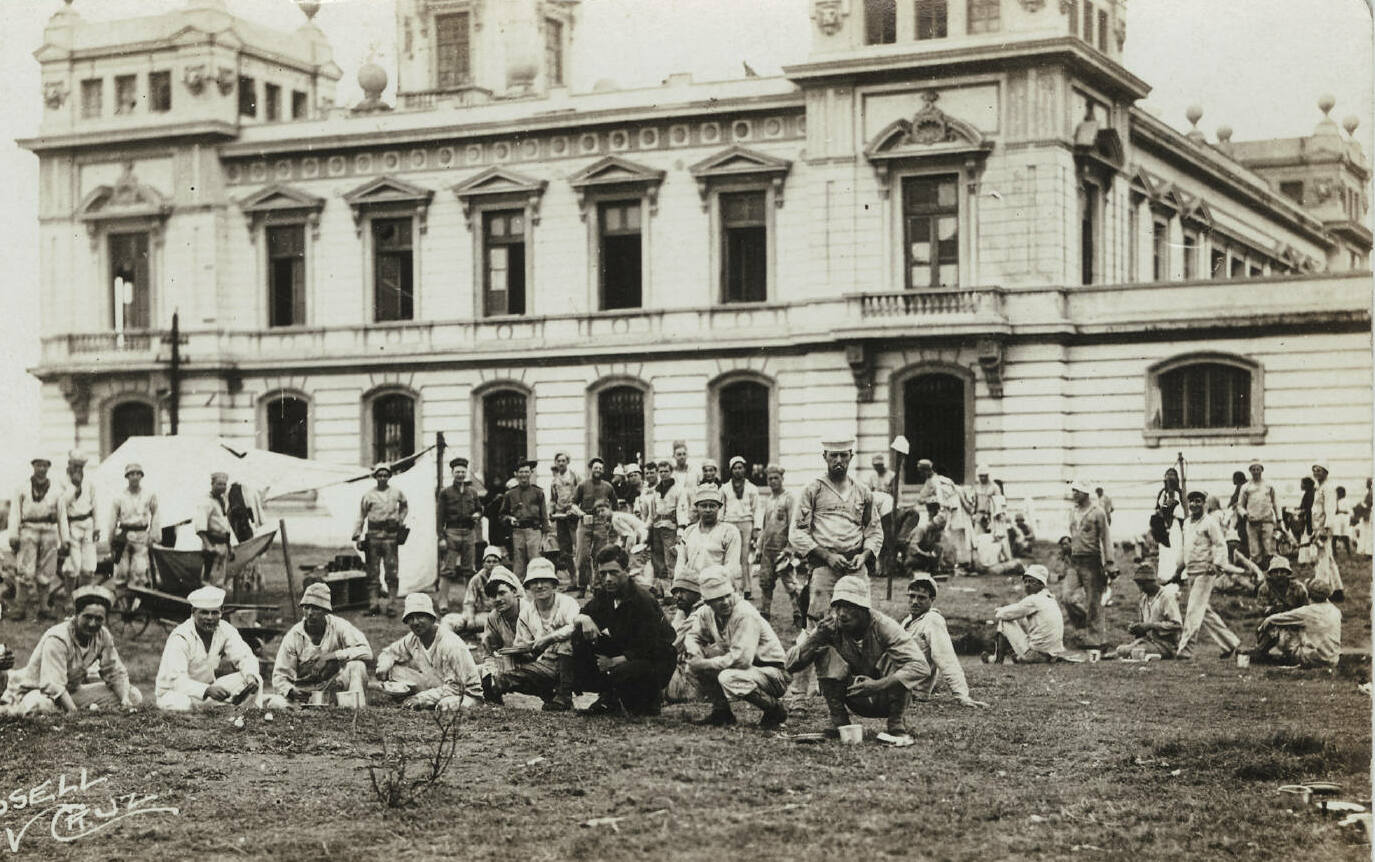
Soldiers at the port of Veracruz during the Mexican Revolution

Between April and November 1914, during the Mexican Revolution (1910–1920), the US attacked and occupied the port in an effort to try to preserve trade in the dispute with President Victoriano Huerta. The city gained its fourth title of "Heroic City".

After the Revolution, most port workers became unionized. Through most of the 20th century, federal and state legal and political initiatives intended to better workers' lives had effects on the operations of the port. Eventually, unions came to have great power over the operations and tariffs charged. By the latter part of the 20th century, competing unions made the operations of the port difficult. Some blocked access to the port from federal roads and financial corruption was a problem.

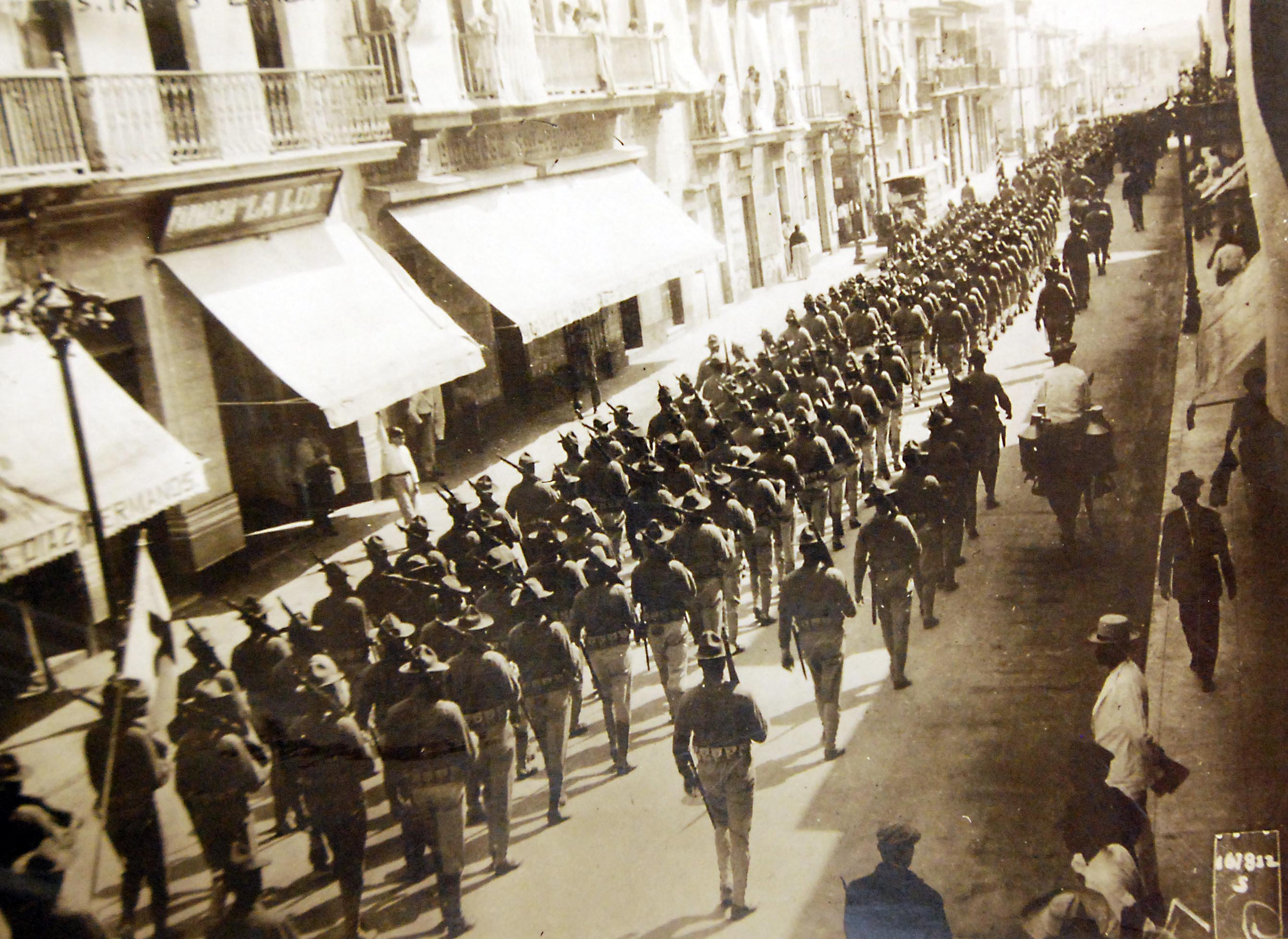
American troops during the 1914 United States occupation of Veracruz

In the 1970s, a federal commission was established to design a new administrative system for the ports of Mexico. The legislature passed laws authorizing the federal government to take control over important ports such as Veracruz. The federal government modernized the port, adopting automation of loading and unloading. This resulted in a reduction of 80% of the port's jobs and labor resistance through strikes. The dockworkers' unions unified, negotiating for members to have a stake in a new company to manage the port's functions, named the Empresa de Servicios Portuarios de Veracruz, S.A. de C.V. The old Compañia Terminal de Veracruz was dissolved in 1988 and the new organization was fully in place by 1991.

=== 21st century ===
In September 2010, Hurricane Karl, a small, strong Category 3 hurricane, caused widespread flooding and damage affecting approximately half a million people. Sixteen were confirmed dead with another eleven missing. Sixty-five municipalities in the state were declared disaster areas. Preliminary damage estimates total up to US$3.9 billion and $50 billion MXN.

== Geography ==
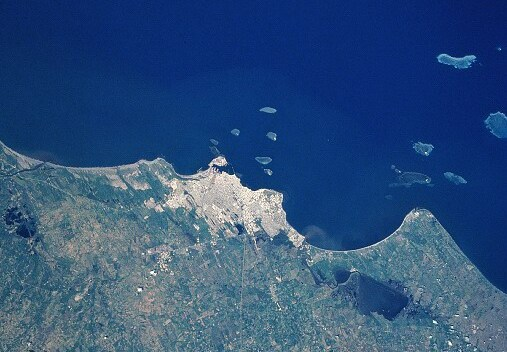
Satellite view of Veracruz

As the municipal seat, the city of Veracruz is the governing authority for 128 other named localities during the 2010 census, forming a municipality with a territory of 241 km^{2} (93 sq mi). The population of the municipality is 552,156 inhabitants, of whom 428,323 or approximately 77.6% live in municipality's portion of the city proper. The municipality is bordered by the municipalities of La Antigua, Boca del Río, Manlio Fabio Altamirano, Medellín, and Paso de Ovejas, with the Gulf of Mexico to the northeast, and has an average altitude of ten meters above sea level. The area is flat with little in the way of elevations and is crossed by the Medio, Grande and Tonayán Rivers. There are also beaches here such as the Sacrificios and Verde. Its climate is tropical with an average temperature of 25.3 °C (77.5 °F). Vegetation is mostly of the rainforest type, with many trees losing leaves during the winter dry season. Fauna mostly consists of birds, small mammals and insects.

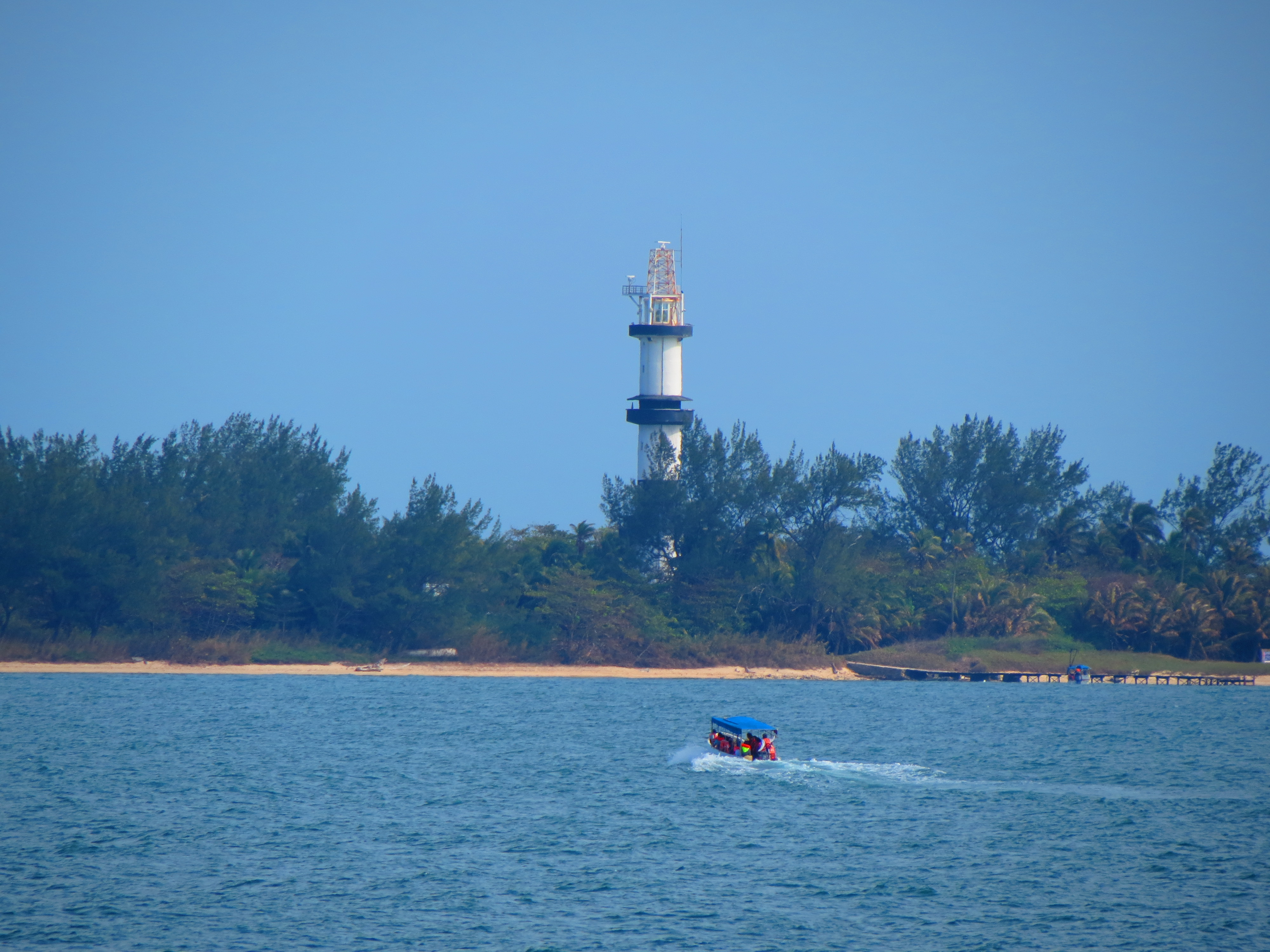
View of Isla de Sacrificios

Much of the land in the municipality outside of the city is used for agriculture and livestock. Principal crops include corn, beans, watermelon, oranges, sorghum, mango, pineapple and sugar cane. Livestock raised includes cattle, pigs, sheep, fowl and horses. There is also some forestry. The municipality contains deposits of marble, lime, cement, sand and clay. In and around the city there are a number of industrial sites producing paints and solvents, food products, plastics, petrochemicals and metals.

Veracruz has many beaches and off coast islands. Controversy has accompanied the clean-up of the island called Isla de Sacrificios, which lies just off the coast of the city and measures 450 meters long and 198 meters wide. The island is part of a system of twenty-three coral reefs called the Veracruz Reef System, which is protected as a national park. Visitors can kayak to the Isla de Sacrificios to observe seagulls, pelicans and the fish that inhabit the coral reef. In 1983, a study and initial cleanup project was undertaken at the island, which collected fifty tons of trash. Shortly thereafter, the island was closed to the public and since then, there has been a struggle among authorities, tour operators and fisherman as to the fate and uses of the island. However, access to the island has been restricted to research, teaching and the occasional sporting event.

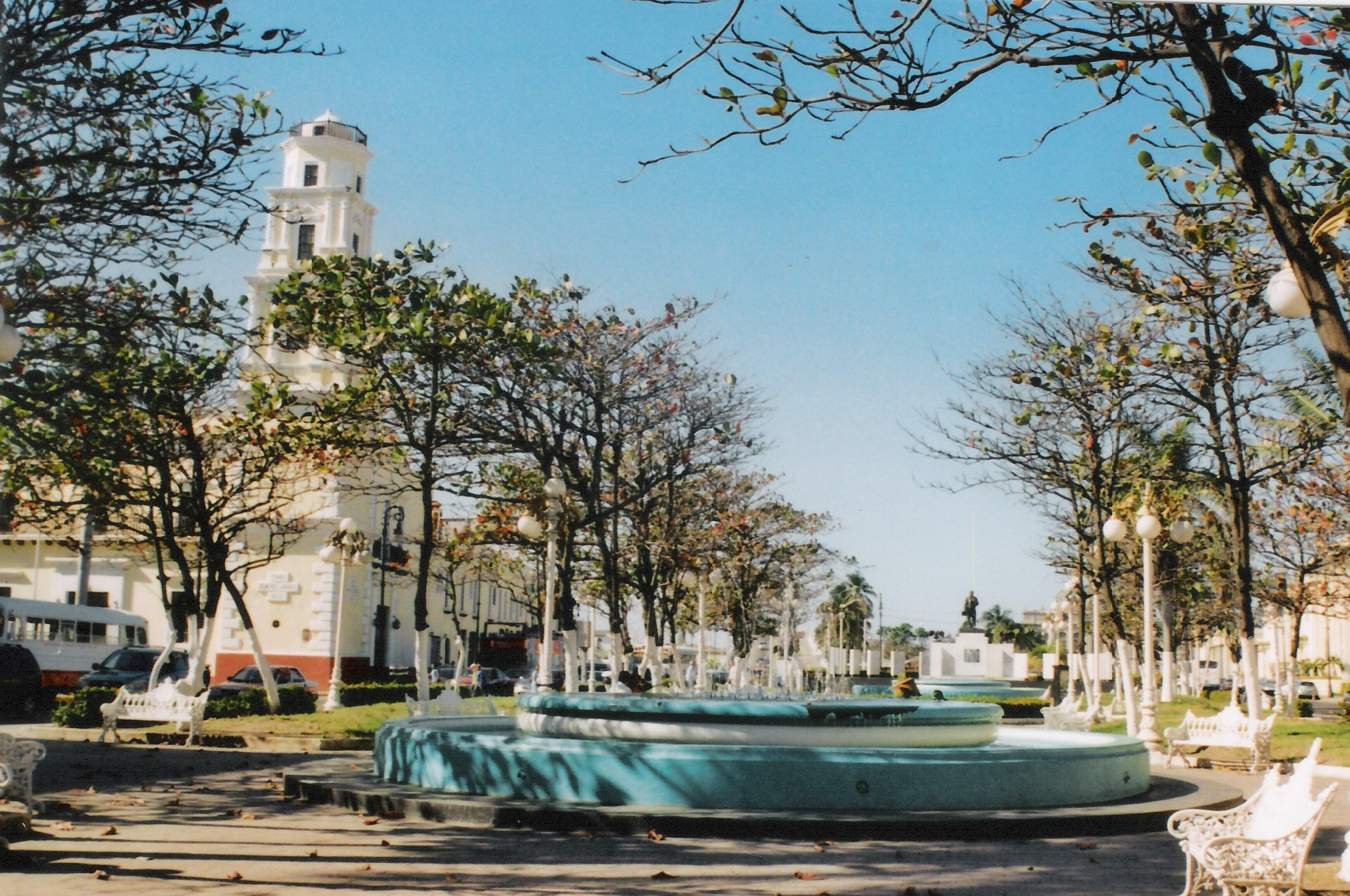
Plaza de la Concordia

Other small islands and shoals off the coast include: Isla de Enmedio, Isla Verde, Anegada de Adentro, Santiaguillo and Anegada de Afuera, the last two next to Antón Lizardo beach. All of them are included within the Sistema Arrecifal Veracruzano national park and make fine sites for SCUBA diving. Several operators in Veracruz and in Boca del Rio offer scuba equipment and tours. The best season for scuba diving is May to August.

The mainland has several beaches. Playa Martí is located between the city of Veracruz and Boca del Río. The Playa de Hornos is located next to the Veracruz Aquarium. There are also boats that take tourist to the Isla Canuncito. Villa del Mar is just south of Playa de Hornos.

=== Climate ===
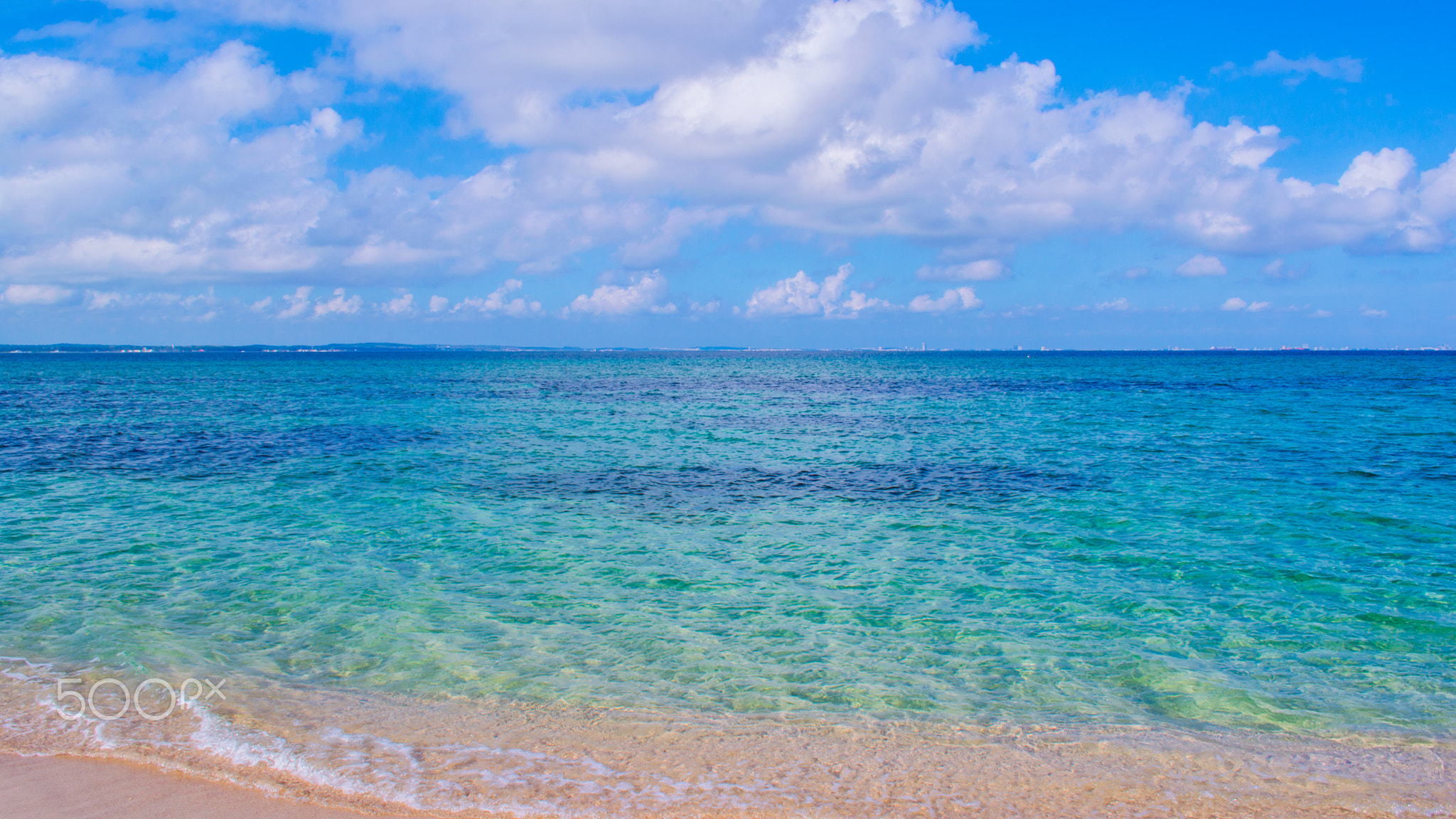
Isla de Enmedio in the Veracruz Reef System National Park

Like the majority of the coastal part of the state of Veracruz and southern parts of Tamaulipas, the city of Veracruz has a tropical savanna climate (Koppen: Aw). The wet season typically lasts from June to October, when a vast majority of the yearly precipitation falls. Large tropical thunderstorms occur nearly daily in the late afternoon, originating in the moist atmosphere above the Gulf of Mexico. The wet season has slightly hotter temperatures and is more humid than other seasons; the dewpoint can easily exceed 25 °C (77.0 °F). It has fewer foggy days than the dry season (averaging around 4–7 foggy days).

The dry season of the year spans from November to May, with slightly cooler temperatures and less humid days; making it the much more desirable part of the year for visiting tourists as opposed to the stormy, humid wet season. Despite the dryness, winters are foggy and cloudy, averaging 10–17 overcast days and 11–17 foggy days per month during the dry season. Many tourists visit Veracruz during Christmas and March break, in the midst of the winter's comfortably warm dry season.

Veracruz receives an average of 1,564 mm (61.6 in) of precipitation annually. The wettest month of the year is July with an average monthly total of 385 mm (15.2 in) of rainfall, while the driest month of the year is March with an only 13 mm (0.51 in) of rainfall. Temperature-wise, the hottest months of the year are June and August, both sharing mean temperatures of 28 °C (82.4 °F), while the coolest month of the year is January with a mean temperature of 21.2 °C (70.2 °F).

Climate data for Veracruz (Synoptic Observatory), elevation: 19.4 m, 1981–2000 averages, extremes 1951–2000 (Note: Although the values have a record of more than two decades, it can not be used as an overview of the local climate, as it does not reach the minimum period of 30 years required by WMO.)
Month	Jan	Feb	Mar	Apr	May	Jun	Jul	Aug	Sep	Oct	Nov	Dec	Year
Record high °C (°F)	34.7 (94.5)	33.2 (91.8)	39.2 (102.6)	39.5 (103.1)	39.5 (103.1)	36.7 (98.1)	37.0 (98.6)	36.0 (96.8)	35.4 (95.7)	35.0 (95.0)	34.0 (93.2)	36.0 (96.8)	39.5 (103.1)
Mean daily maximum °C (°F)	24.7 (76.5)	25.0 (77.0)	27.4 (81.3)	29.2 (84.6)	31.1 (88.0)	31.4 (88.5)	31.2 (88.2)	31.2 (88.2)	30.8 (87.4)	29.7 (85.5)	27.7 (81.9)	25.9 (78.6)	28.8 (83.8)
Daily mean °C (°F)	21.5 (70.7)	21.9 (71.4)	24.0 (75.2)	25.8 (78.4)	27.8 (82.0)	28.1 (82.6)	27.5 (81.5)	27.6 (81.7)	27.2 (81.0)	26.2 (79.2)	24.2 (75.6)	22.6 (72.7)	25.4 (77.7)
Mean daily minimum °C (°F)	18.4 (65.1)	18.8 (65.8)	20.7 (69.3)	22.5 (72.5)	24.6 (76.3)	24.8 (76.6)	23.8 (74.8)	23.9 (75.0)	23.6 (74.5)	22.7 (72.9)	20.7 (69.3)	19.3 (66.7)	22.0 (71.6)
Record low °C (°F)	5.8 (42.4)	7.2 (45.0)	2.0 (35.6)	9.0 (48.2)	14.5 (58.1)	17.0 (62.6)	19.8 (67.6)	13.2 (55.8)	17.0 (62.6)	12.0 (53.6)	2.0 (35.6)	0.2 (32.4)	0.2 (32.4)
Average precipitation mm (inches)	37.9 (1.49)	17.8 (0.70)	13.1 (0.52)	24.4 (0.96)	74.2 (2.92)	196.3 (7.73)	385.1 (15.16)	320.5 (12.62)	292.6 (11.52)	130.7 (5.15)	32.0 (1.26)	39.6 (1.56)	1,564 (61.57)
Average precipitation days (≥ 0.1 mm)	5.3	3.1	3.8	3.8	5.0	12.8	18.5	16.4	15.4	10.6	6.2	5.7	106.7
Average relative humidity (%)	81.0	79.0	74.0	77.0	72.0	73.0	79.0	80.0	79.0	77.0	79.0	81.0	77.6
Mean monthly sunshine hours	162.0	165.0	192.0	205.0	203.0	207.0	187.0	177.0	162.0	170.0	179.0	161.0	2,170
Source: SMN

Climate data for Veracruz (Synoptic Observatory), elevation: 19.4 m, 1961–1990 normals
Month	Jan	Feb	Mar	Apr	May	Jun	Jul	Aug	Sep	Oct	Nov	Dec	Year
Mean daily maximum °C (°F)	24.3 (75.7)	24.6 (76.3)	26.5 (79.7)	28.7 (83.7)	30.4 (86.7)	30.8 (87.4)	30.9 (87.6)	31.2 (88.2)	30.8 (87.4)	29.6 (85.3)	27.6 (81.7)	25.5 (77.9)	28.4 (83.1)
Daily mean °C (°F)	21.2 (70.2)	21.6 (70.9)	23.4 (74.1)	25.6 (78.1)	27.4 (81.3)	28.0 (82.4)	27.6 (81.7)	28.0 (82.4)	27.6 (81.7)	26.5 (79.7)	24.5 (76.1)	22.5 (72.5)	25.3 (77.5)
Mean daily minimum °C (°F)	18.1 (64.6)	18.5 (65.3)	20.6 (69.1)	22.8 (73.0)	24.6 (76.3)	24.5 (76.1)	23.6 (74.5)	23.9 (75.0)	23.6 (74.5)	22.7 (72.9)	20.9 (69.6)	19.3 (66.7)	21.9 (71.4)
Average precipitation mm (inches)	22.0 (0.87)	17.0 (0.67)	17.0 (0.67)	22.0 (0.87)	46.0 (1.81)	302.0 (11.89)	411.0 (16.18)	352.0 (13.86)	352.0 (13.86)	131.0 (5.16)	54.0 (2.13)	27.0 (1.06)	1,753 (69.03)
Average precipitation days (≥ 0.1 mm)	4.0	4.0	4.0	4.0	5.0	14.0	21.0	19.0	18.0	12.0	8.0	6.0	119
Average relative humidity (%)	75.5	76.0	74.0	75.0	75.5	78.0	77.0	77.0	74.5	73.0	73.5	76.0	75.4
Mean monthly sunshine hours	146.3	157.9	188.9	205.9	205.4	208.0	205.1	222.5	188.7	193.5	178.7	145.8	2,246.7
Source: NOAA

Climate data for Veracruz (Synoptic Observatory), elevation: 19.4 m, 1951–1980 normals and extremes
Month	Jan	Feb	Mar	Apr	May	Jun	Jul	Aug	Sep	Oct	Nov	Dec	Year
Record high °C (°F)	32.7 (90.9)	33.2 (91.8)	37.7 (99.9)	39.5 (103.1)	36.8 (98.2)	36.3 (97.3)	36.0 (96.8)	35.3 (95.5)	35.0 (95.0)	34.4 (93.9)	32.6 (90.7)	36.0 (96.8)	39.5 (103.1)
Mean daily maximum °C (°F)	24.6 (76.3)	24.9 (76.8)	26.5 (79.7)	28.6 (83.5)	30.2 (86.4)	30.7 (87.3)	30.7 (87.3)	31.2 (88.2)	30.7 (87.3)	29.6 (85.3)	27.4 (81.3)	25.4 (77.7)	28.4 (83.1)
Daily mean °C (°F)	21.4 (70.5)	21.8 (71.2)	23.5 (74.3)	25.7 (78.3)	27.4 (81.3)	27.9 (82.2)	27.6 (81.7)	28.0 (82.4)	27.6 (81.7)	26.4 (79.5)	24.2 (75.6)	22.2 (72.0)	25.3 (77.6)
Mean daily minimum °C (°F)	21.4 (70.5)	21.8 (71.2)	23.5 (74.3)	25.7 (78.3)	27.4 (81.3)	27.9 (82.2)	27.6 (81.7)	28.0 (82.4)	27.6 (81.7)	26.4 (79.5)	24.2 (75.6)	22.2 (72.0)	25.3 (77.6)
Record low °C (°F)	10.5 (50.9)	8.7 (47.7)	12.7 (54.9)	15.8 (60.4)	17.7 (63.9)	17.0 (62.6)	20.4 (68.7)	20.5 (68.9)	17.0 (62.6)	16.8 (62.2)	13.1 (55.6)	9.0 (48.2)	8.7 (47.7)
Average precipitation mm (inches)	24.1 (0.95)	16.0 (0.63)	14.5 (0.57)	17.4 (0.69)	48.2 (1.90)	298.3 (11.74)	419.9 (16.53)	323.1 (12.72)	358.6 (14.12)	152.9 (6.02)	59.6 (2.35)	24.4 (0.96)	1,757 (69.18)
Average precipitation days (≥ 0.1 mm)	4.83	3.51	3.17	3.31	4.93	14.82	20.63	18.6	17.7	11.36	7.4	5.8	116.06
Average relative humidity (%)	80.0	80.0	81.0	80.0	78.0	79.0	79.0	78.0	78.0	74.0	77.0	80.0	79.0
Mean monthly sunshine hours	147.3	166.2	175.7	182.1	194.7	203.2	200.0	227.0	174.5	193.0	165.5	140.7	2,169.9
Source: COLPOS

== Culture ==
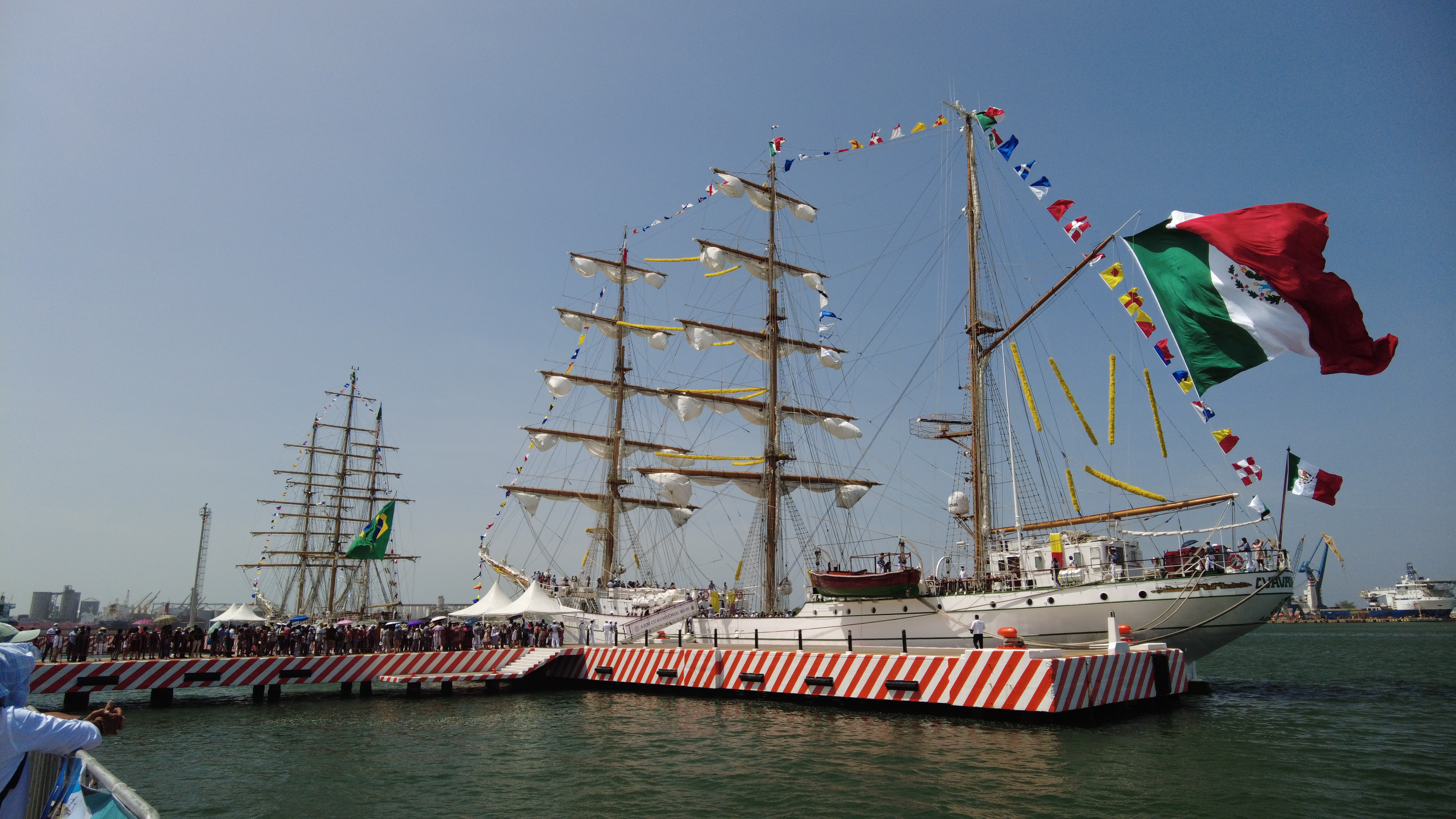
Ships at the 2022 Latin American Festival of Sailing

Because of its importance as Mexico's principal Caribbean and Atlantic sea port, Veracruz has always been a locus for the mixture of different cultures, particularly Spanish, Native Mexican, and African. During the colonial period, African slaves were imported to work in the fields and shipyards. Following Mexico's independence from Spain in 1821, immigrants from Italy and Cuba settled in the city.

The Veracruz Carnaval has been celebrated every year since 1866, during the empire of Maximilian I. At that time, a request was made to sponsor a "Festival of Masks", which would consist of dances at the principal social gathering sites of the city such as the main theater. While the events were officially held at these locations, many residents took advantage of the celebration on the streets near these sites. Eventually, the event became based in the historic center of the city and focused on the Carnaval Parade of Veracruz. Today, the event begins with the "Burning of Bad Humor" and ends with the "Burial of Juan Carnaval". Carnaval here is the largest celebration in the country.

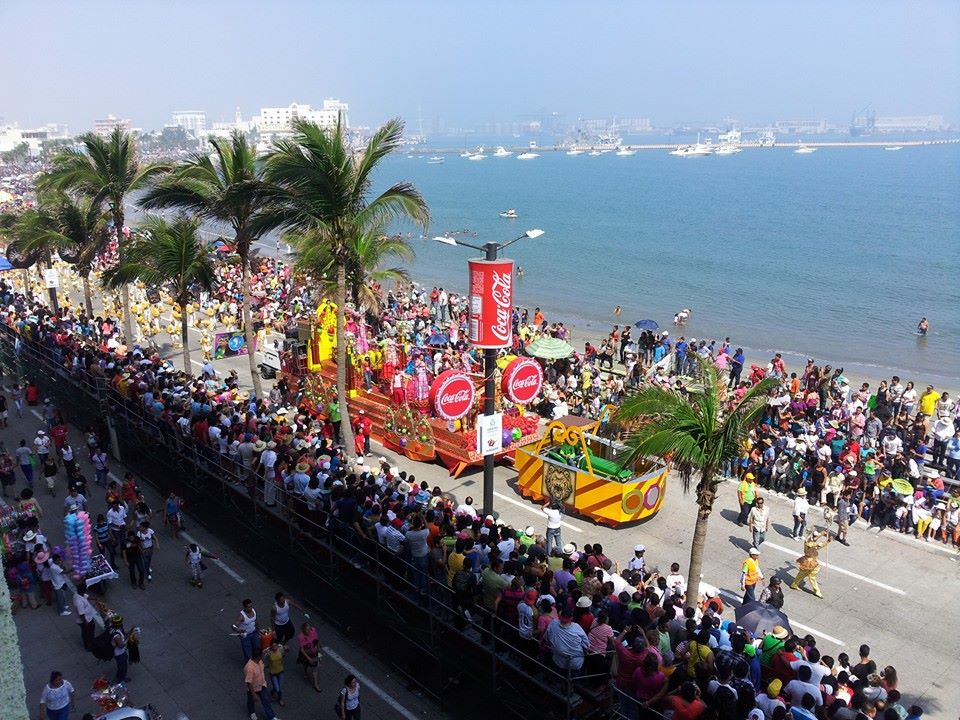
The Carnaval of Veracruz parade

Sugar and rum production have been mainstays as commodities; during colonial times they were produced by slave labor and later, immigrants often entered labor and industrial jobs. Together these ethnic groups have created rich cultures. The Naval Academy attracts both Mexican and international sailors and officers, adding to the cosmopolitan mix of the city. The city has a reputation for being lively, with many people out in the squares listening to music late into the night. In the morning, they frequent sidewalk cafes for their morning coffee. Veracruz has become a popular location for filming. The government has supported the development of filmmaking in the municipality.

=== Music ===
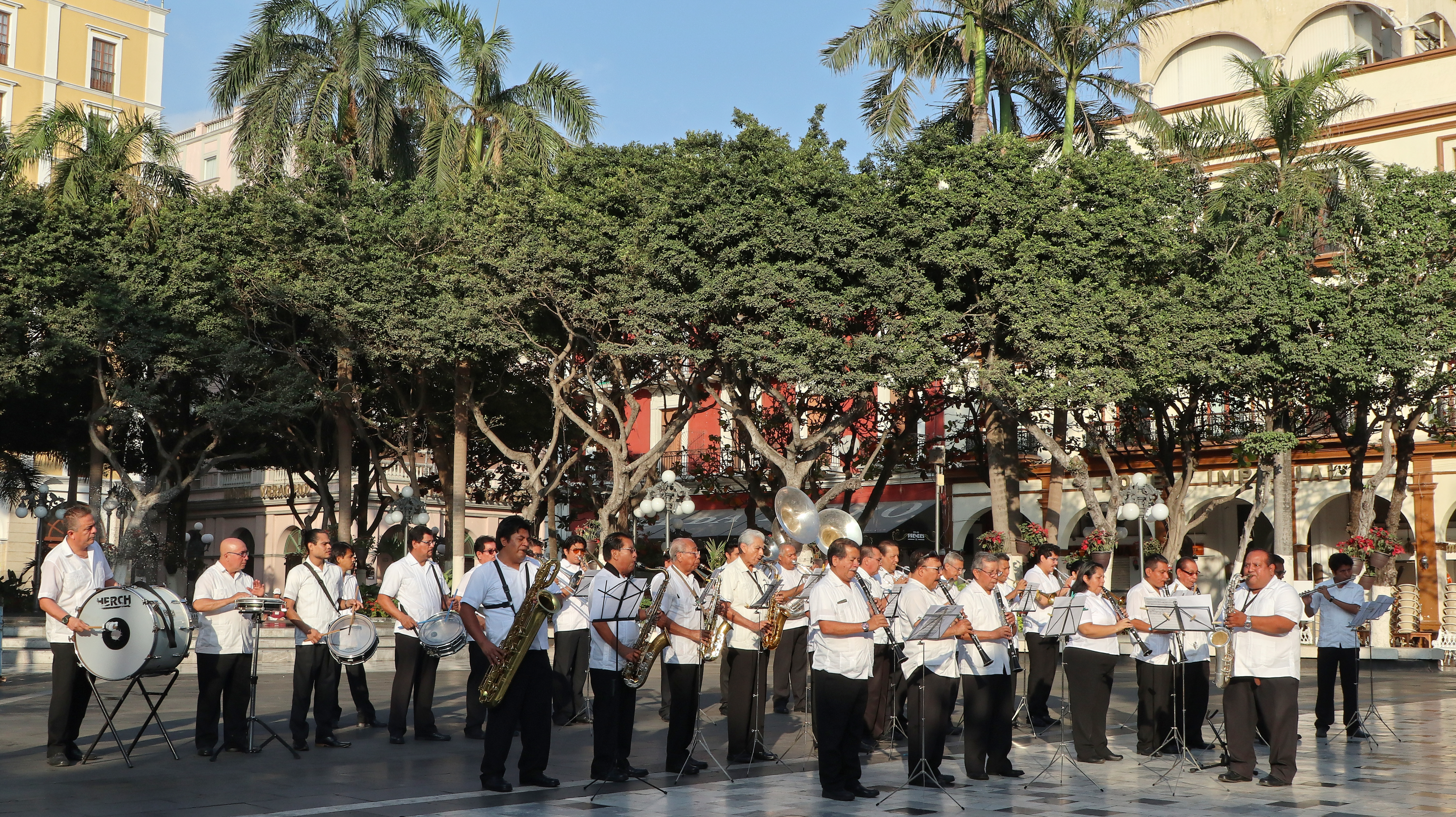
Son Jarocho players in a plaza in Veracruz's historic center

The song "La Bamba", made famous by Ritchie Valens, has its roots in the Veracruz "son" style of music, which originated in southern part of the state of Veracruz. It has African and Caribbean influence and is popular throughout Mexico, Latin America and the United States.

Traditional Veracruzian music is called "Son Jarocho". Although there are many types of son music found in Mexico, the Son Jarocho is typically associated with the city of Veracruz. Other types of son include "Son Comercial". This style is faster and flashier than the traditional Son Jarocho and can be heard in Mexican folkdance exhibitions, when Veracruz women with long white dresses and fans dance with partners also dressed in white. The Son Comercial developed in the 1940s from the Son Jarocho; in the 21st century it is so pervasive that many mistakenly believe it to be the first version. The Casa de Cultura has a workshops for traditional music and son singers can be heard just about anytime on the main plaza (Zócalo).

=== Cuisine ===
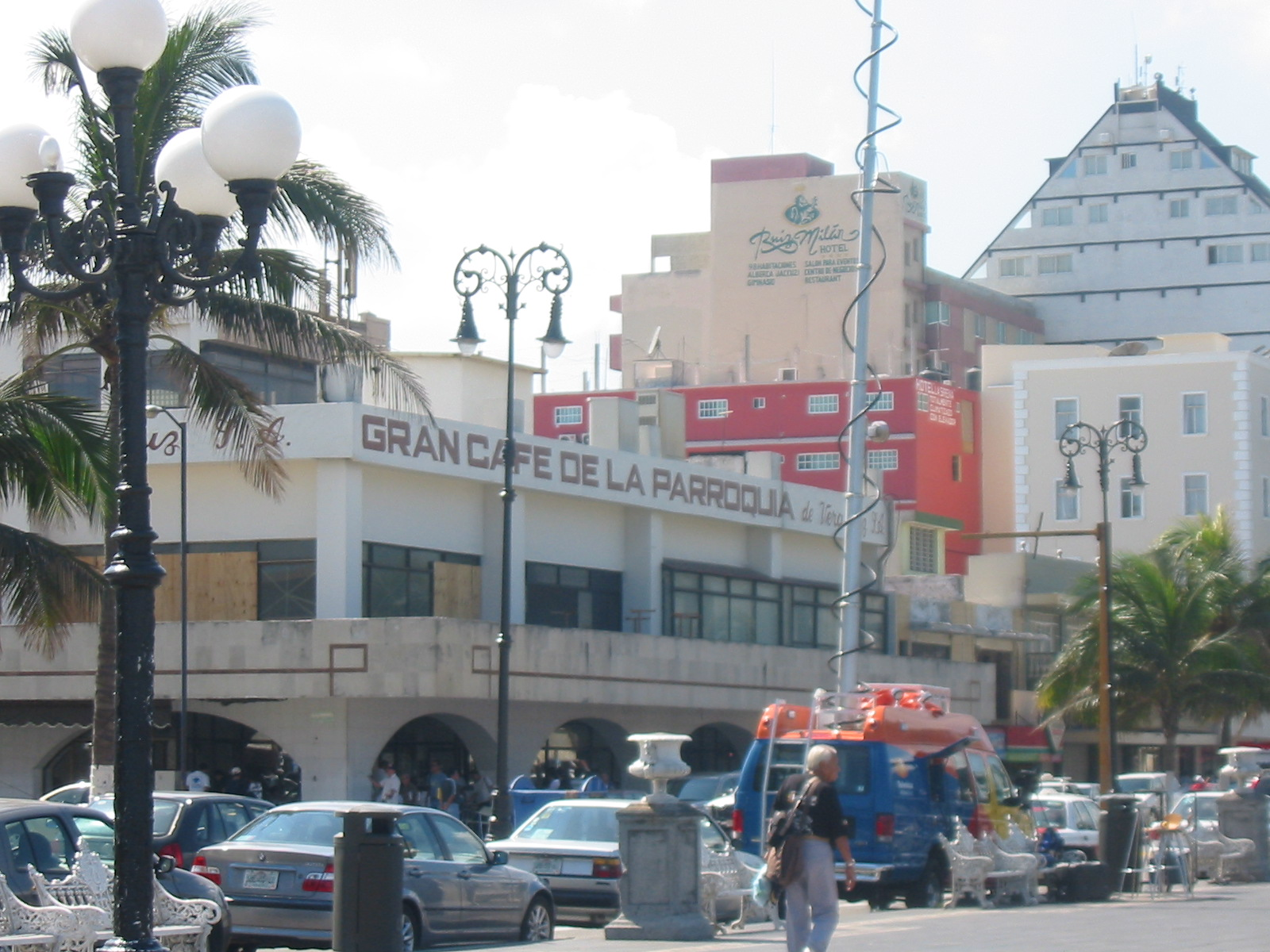
El Gran Café de la Parroquia is a famous cafe in Veracruz

Veracruz recipes use corn, beans and squash as staples, a practice dating to the indigenous peoples. Local diets also include indigenous tropical foods such as chili peppers, tomatoes, avocados, pineapples, papaya, mamey, sweet potatoes, peanuts and sapote fruit, all of which have been cultivated since pre-Columbian times. The Spanish introduced the use of herbs such as parsley, thyme, marjoram, bay laurel and coriander, as well as saffron, wheat, rice, almonds, olives/olive oil, garlic and capers. Because of the lengthy colonial period and international port, these ingredients are used more widely here than in other parts of the country.

A signature dish of the area, Huachinango a la Veracruzana (red snapper Veracruz-style), uses local fruits and vegetables (tomatoes, chili peppers) and Spanish ingredients (olive oil, garlic and capers). Other popular dishes include arroz a la tumbada, a rice dish baked with a variety of seafood and caldo de mariscos, a seafood soup reputed to cure hangovers.

Coffeehouses are a center of social life in the city, and the Gran Café del Portal and the Café de la Parroquia are the two best-known establishments. To request a refill, customers clink the sides of their glasses (not cups) with their spoons. This clinking can be heard from the early morning to late at night. The story behind this custom is that a trolley driver used to ring his bell when he was a block away from the Gran Café del Portal to let the waiters know he was coming. When the driver died, his casket was borne on the trolley and when it passed the establishment, the customers and waiters tapped their glasses in his honor.

=== Landmarks ===
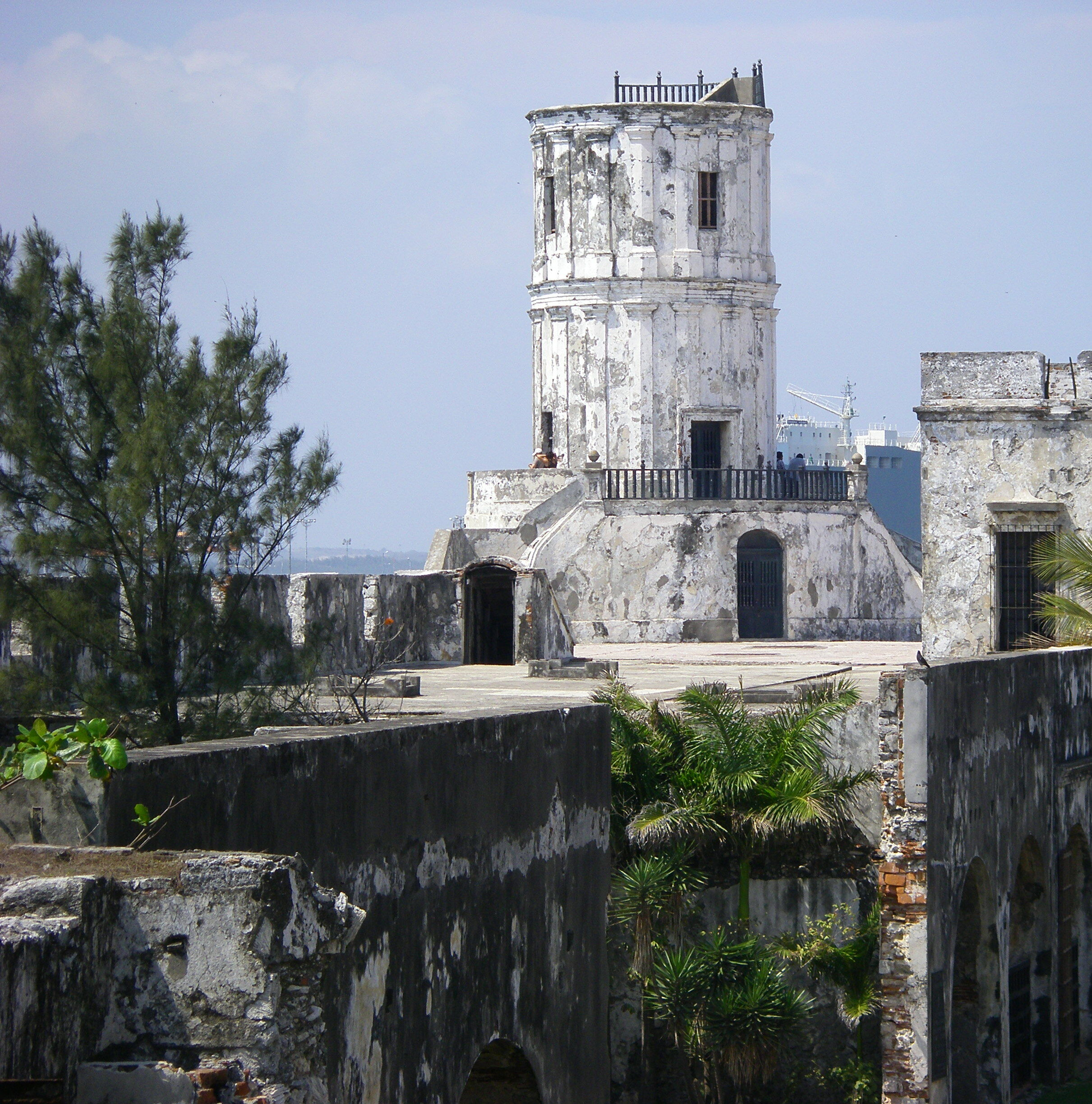
The Castle of San Juan de Ulúa, built by the Spanish beginning in 1519

Veracruz is not as popular a tourist destination as many other resort areas. But the city has been promoting an identity as a tourist destination, emphasizing new attractions such as the Veracruz Aquarium and the City Museum, and the renovation of historic ones, such as Fort San Juan de Ulúa and the Naval Academy.

The cultural center of the city is its main plaza, officially named Plaza de las Armas but commonly called the Zócalo. This tree-shaded square, in which a number of foreign invading armies have camped, is occupied from morning to night with people playing dominos, selling food, cigars, etc. playing music, dancing and other activities. It is more crowded in the evening, when nearly every night the danzón is danced. This dance was brought over to Mexico from Cuba by refugees in the 1870s. It was originally restricted to the lower classes but eventually gained accepted by all levels of society. The danzón is sponsored by several dance schools dedicated to keeping the tradition alive. Around the plaza are numerous shops and restaurants, as well as the municipal palace and the cathedral.

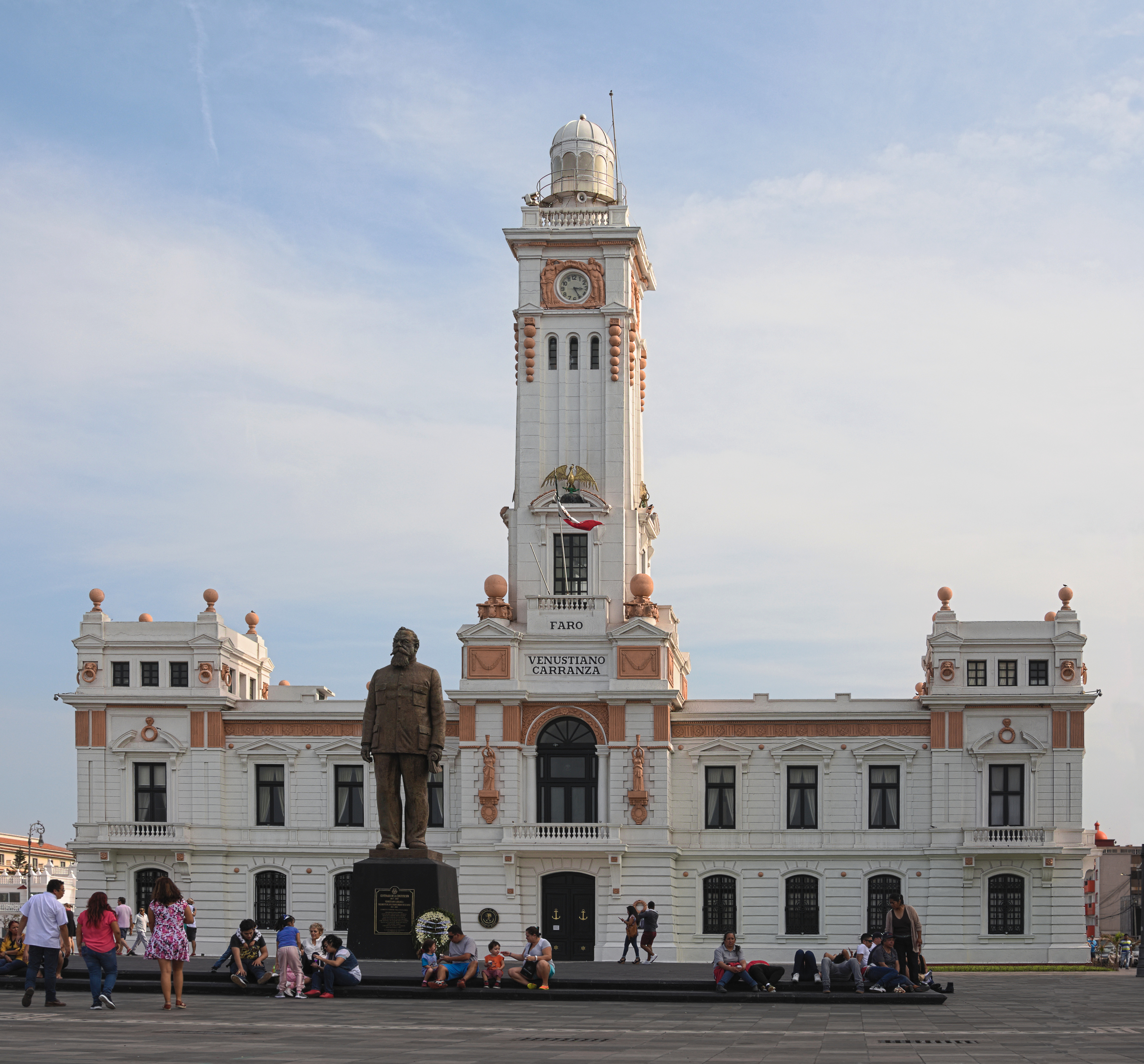
Venustiano Carranza Lighthouse

The Municipal Palace was built for the city council in 1608. The building was extensively remodeled in the 18th century. Its architectural style is a sober Baroque with a tower at one of the corners. Lookouts used this tower to keep watch on the ships entering and leaving the port. It has a large courtyard surrounded by wide arches and is the oldest city government building in Mexico.

The Cathedral of Veracruz, named Catedral de la Virgen de la Asunción, is also located on the Zócalo. This cathedral was begun in the 17th century and finished in 1731. It was modified in the 19th century but was not designated as a cathedral until 1963. The building has five naves, with an octagonal cupola covered in Puebla tiles. The tower was begun in the early 20th century and has its own small cupola. The main façade is Neoclassic with two levels and a crest. The lower level contains an arched entrance flanked by two Doric columns and the upper level contains the choral window, above which is a medallion. The interior is simple with crystal candelabras.

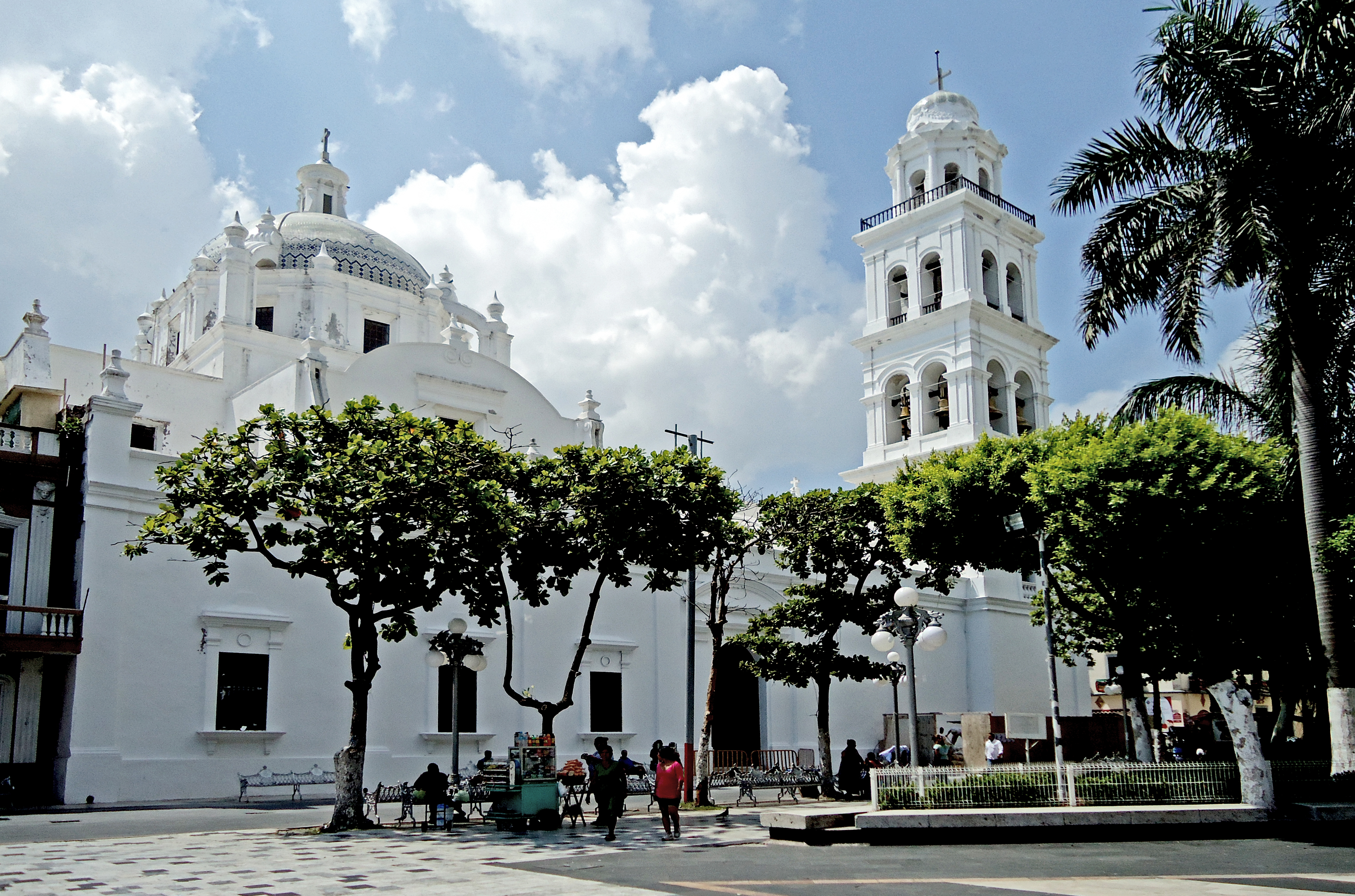
Veracruz Cathedral, built 1731

In the port area are the Pemex Tower, the old lighthouse, which was the seat of government for Venustiano Carranza, and the Crafts Market. On Marina Mercante Street are located the Old Customs Building, the Postal and Telegraph twin buildings, as well as the old railroad terminal. In the 1920s, passenger traffic was such that the station had its own hotel. The Juárez Hemicycle Monument stands in front of the Civil Registry Building, which contains the first birth certificate issued in the country.

The malecón (boardwalk) stretches for kilometers along the Gulf of Mexico, leading from the city center into the suburbs. This area is popular at night, when people stroll and exercise, enjoying the ocean breezes. Near the city center, the malecón is crowded with merchants selling knick-knacks, souvenirs, jewelry made with seashells, and T-shirts.

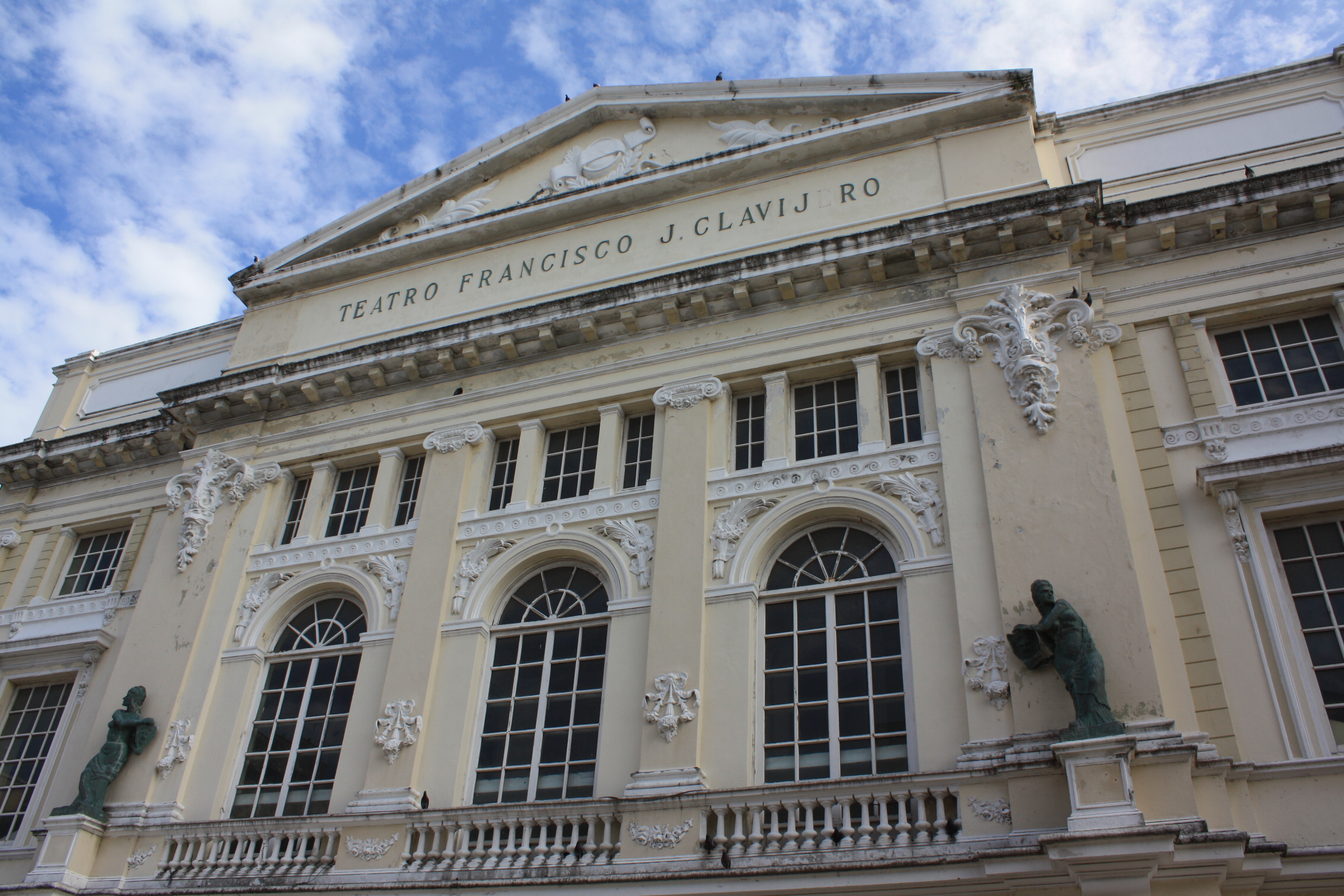
The historic Clavijero Theatre

Fort San Juan de Ulúa is located on an island, now connected to land of the same name. The island is part of the La Gallega coral reef and has about 2,500 meters of beach. The full reef covers about 100 hectares and varies in depth between sixty and ninety centimeters, forming a natural break. In the pre-Hispanic era, this island was a sanctuary dedicated to the god Tezcatlipoca. The site where the Spanish first landed has been developed over the centuries and today serves as the container ship terminal of the port. Most of the island is occupied by the fort. This fort was built where the Spanish first landed to conquer Mexico City. They used it for their last defense during and just after the Mexican War of Independence. Between these periods, the fort helped defend the city against piracy and later was used for prisoners and interrogations of the Mexican Inquisition. The fort was begun here in 1582 to protect the city from pirates and was enlarged in 1635 during the period of frequent pirate raids. It was finished in 1707.

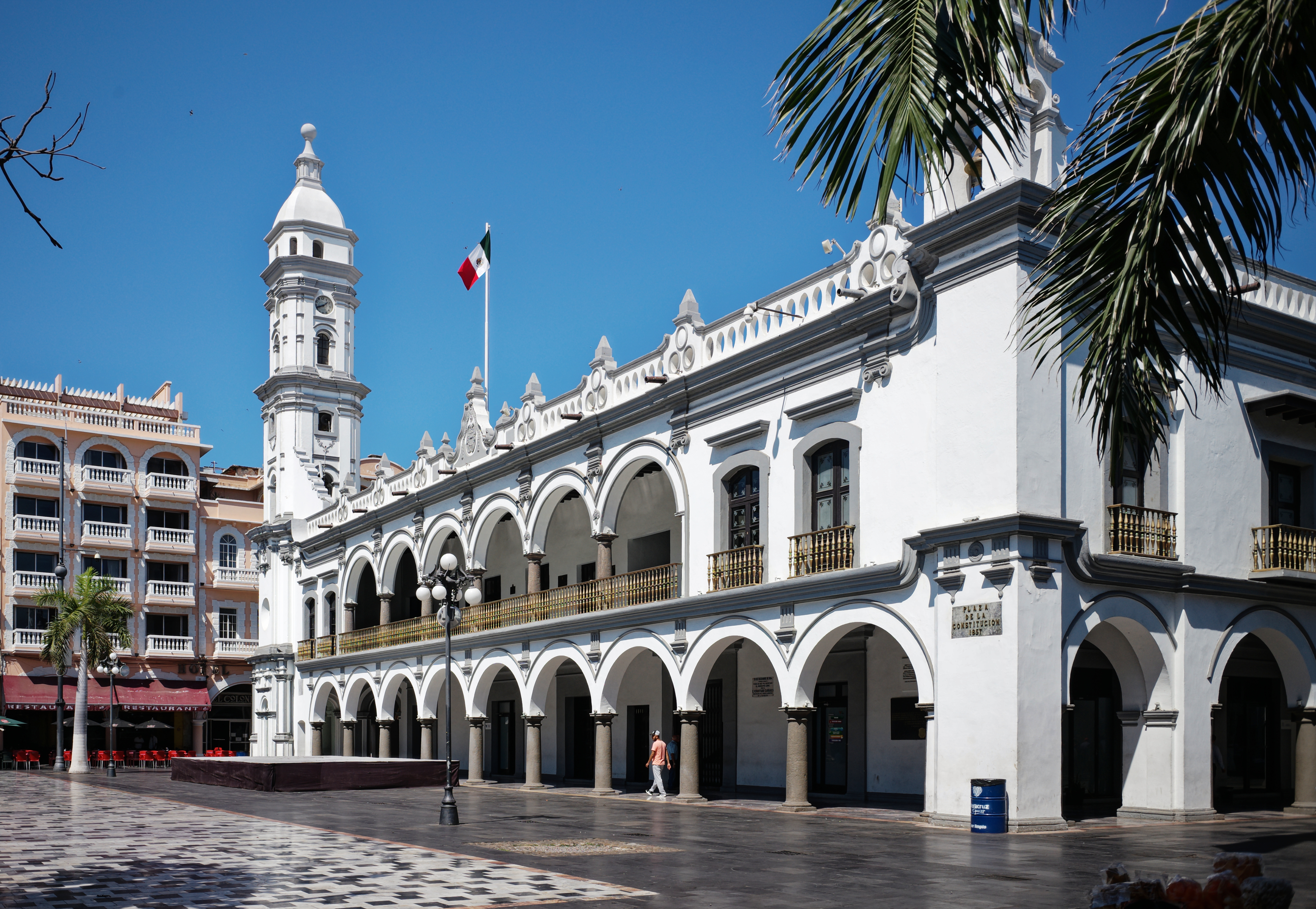
The Municipal Palace of Veracruz

After the War of Independence ended in 1821, the Spanish kept control of the island and fort, and occasionally bombarded Mexican forces on land. They finally transferred this area to Mexico in 1825. The fort was used in 1838 during the Pastry War with the French. In 1847, it was used for an unsuccessful defense of the port when United States forces invaded during the Mexican–American War.

In the 19th century, the fort was converted into a military prison. The fort's narrow stone passageways lead to a series of dungeons with walls 24-feet thick in some places. Those cells which were darker and hotter were reserved for those charged with more serious crimes. A few of the most dreaded dungeons were nicknamed "Heaven", "Purgatory" and "Hell". Some of prison's more famous prisoners include Fray Servando Teresa de Mier and Benito Juárez, both political prisoners. But the most famous is Jesús Arriaga, better known as "Chucho el Roto". Most people visit San Juan de Ulúa out of attraction to the legend of this 19th-century bandit.

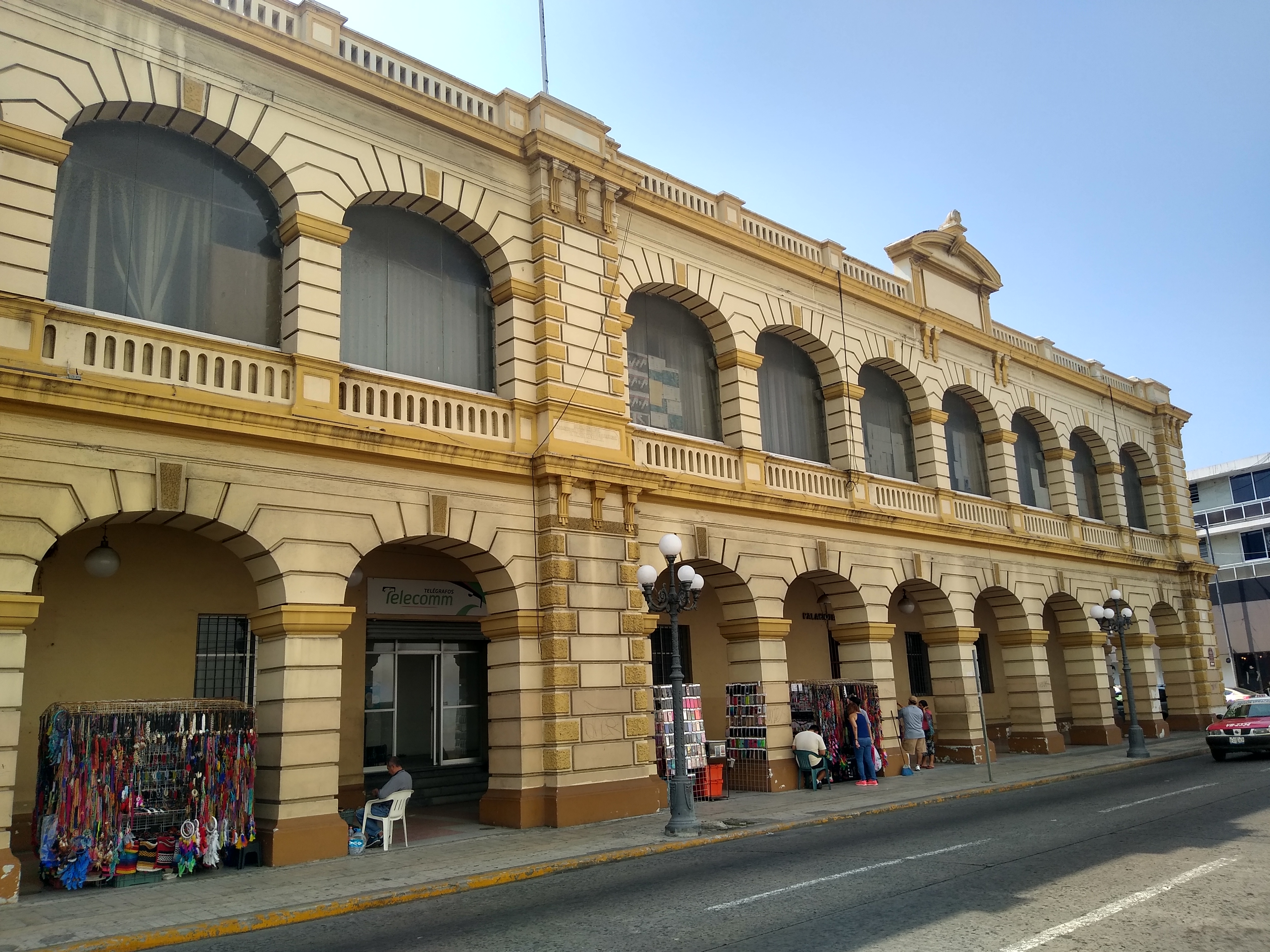
The Palacio Federal de Veracruz

Jesús Arriaga, better known as Chucho el Roto, was held at Fort San Juan de Ulúa where he died. It is not known whether he died of natural causes, as a result of a fight with other prisoners or by other means. Chucho was a Robin Hood figure who lived during the 19th century. He stole from the rich and gave to the poor, inspiring songs and poetry such as the verses penned by Rafael de Zayas Enríquez. Chucho was arrested in the city of Querétaro after a jewelry store heist. He was sent to the Belén Prison in Mexico City, then to Veracruz. He was also renowned as a seducer of women, especially those who were rich and lonely. Most of his targets were jewelry shops, pawnshops and the homes of the wealthy.

Along with Fort San Juan de Ulúa, the city used to be walled in for protection against pirates and invasions. All that is left of these city walls is the Baluarte, a small fortress. The 1635 structure has thick, sturdy walls with cannons directed to cover sea approaches. Inside is a small museum featuring a collection of high-quality pre-Hispanic jewelry discovered in the 1970s by a fisherman.

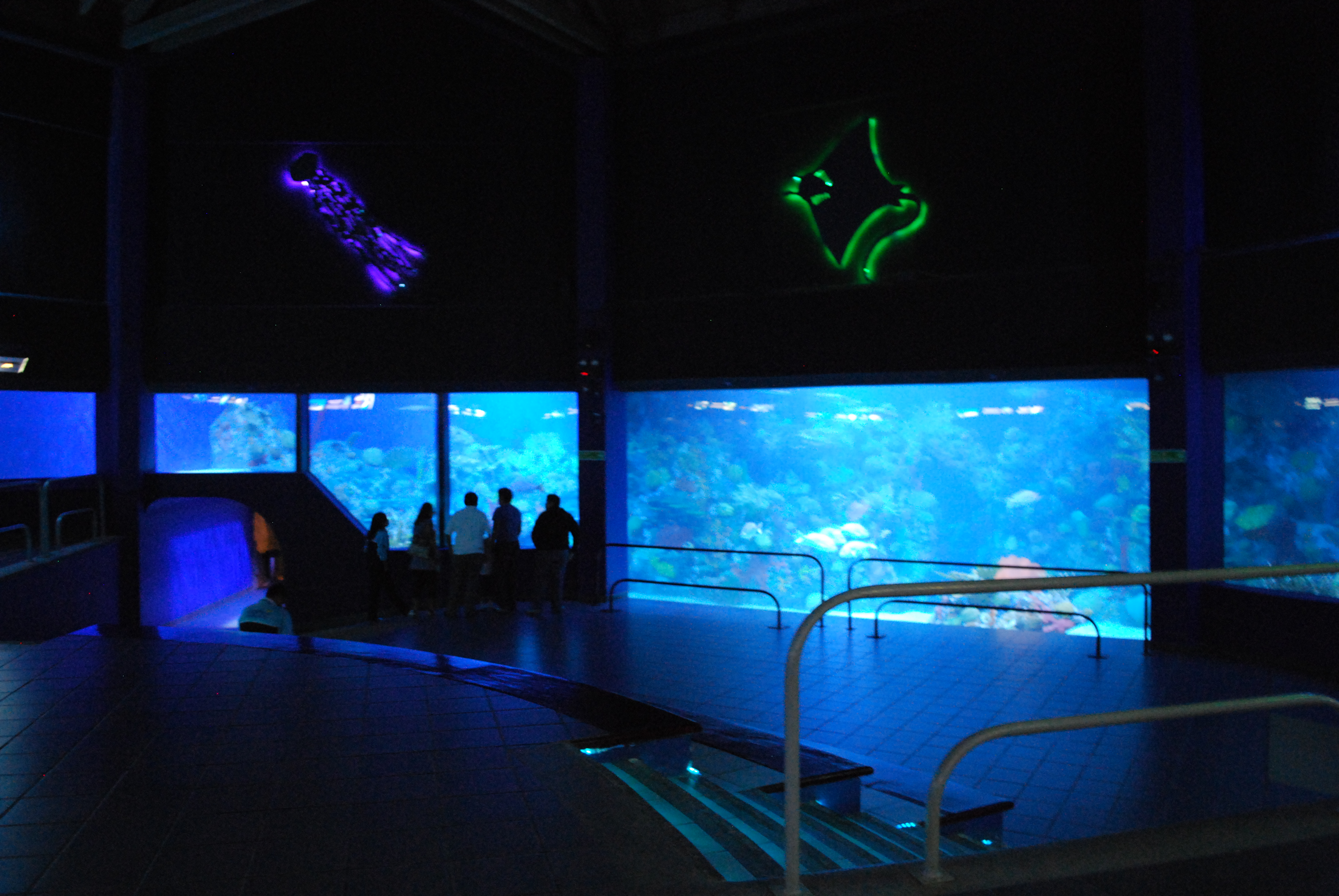
Veracruz Aquarium

The Veracruz Aquarium was built in 1992 and is the largest and most important in Latin America. The Freshwater Gallery consists of thirteen exhibitions containing 562,177 liters of water. These exhibitions contain aquatic species from Asia, Africa, South America as well as Mexico. The Reef Tank is best known for its sharks. The Salt Water Gallery contains fourteen tanks with tanks dedicated to the species of Veracruz, the Red Sea and the Pacific Ocean. Another exhibit is devoted to sharks, containing 25 species that swim around visitors as they walk through a glass tunnel built through the tank. There is also an exhibit dedicated entirely to manatees.

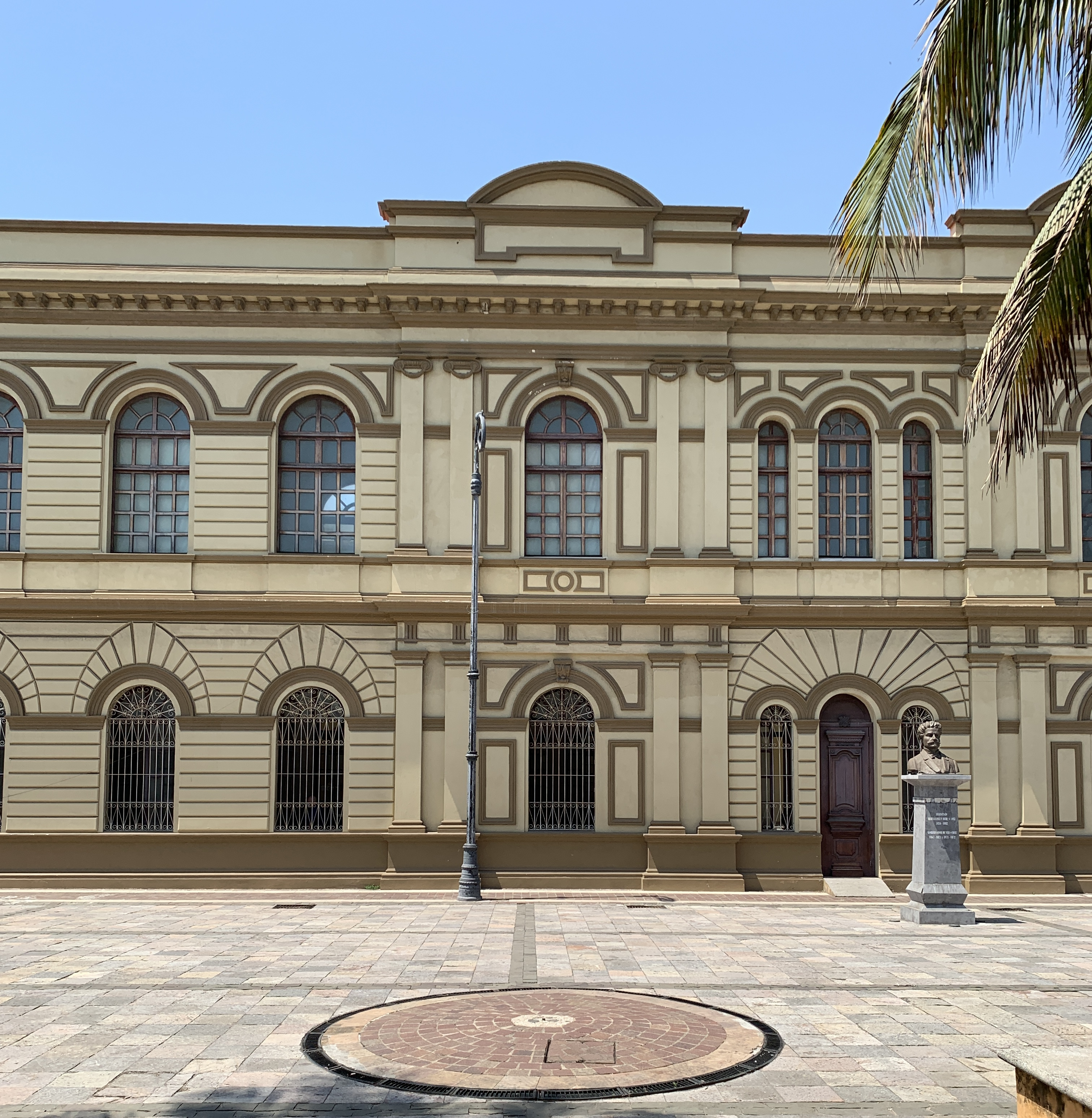
Las Atarazanas Cultural Center

The Heroica Escuela Naval (Heroic Naval School) was founded here in 1897 by José María de Vega, then Secretary of the Navy. The school was founded because at the time, Mexico was dependent on the hiring of foreign sailors and foreign training of its officers to staff its Navy; prior attempts to establish an academy had failed. Porfirio Díaz approved the institute to train both Navy and Merchant Marine officers, to be based on similar schools in Western Europe.

The City Museum (Museo de la Ciudad) is located at the intersections of Zaragoza and Esteban Morales streets in the historic center. It is housed in a two-story building which is of neoclassic design built between the mid and latter 19th century. The main façade on Zaragoza Street has an enormous main door with posts, framed by Ionic pilasters, which reach to the upper floor, and topped by a pediment and a cornice. The building was originally constructed as an asylum. When the French invaded Veracruz in 1861, the building was commandeered for other purposes until 1870.

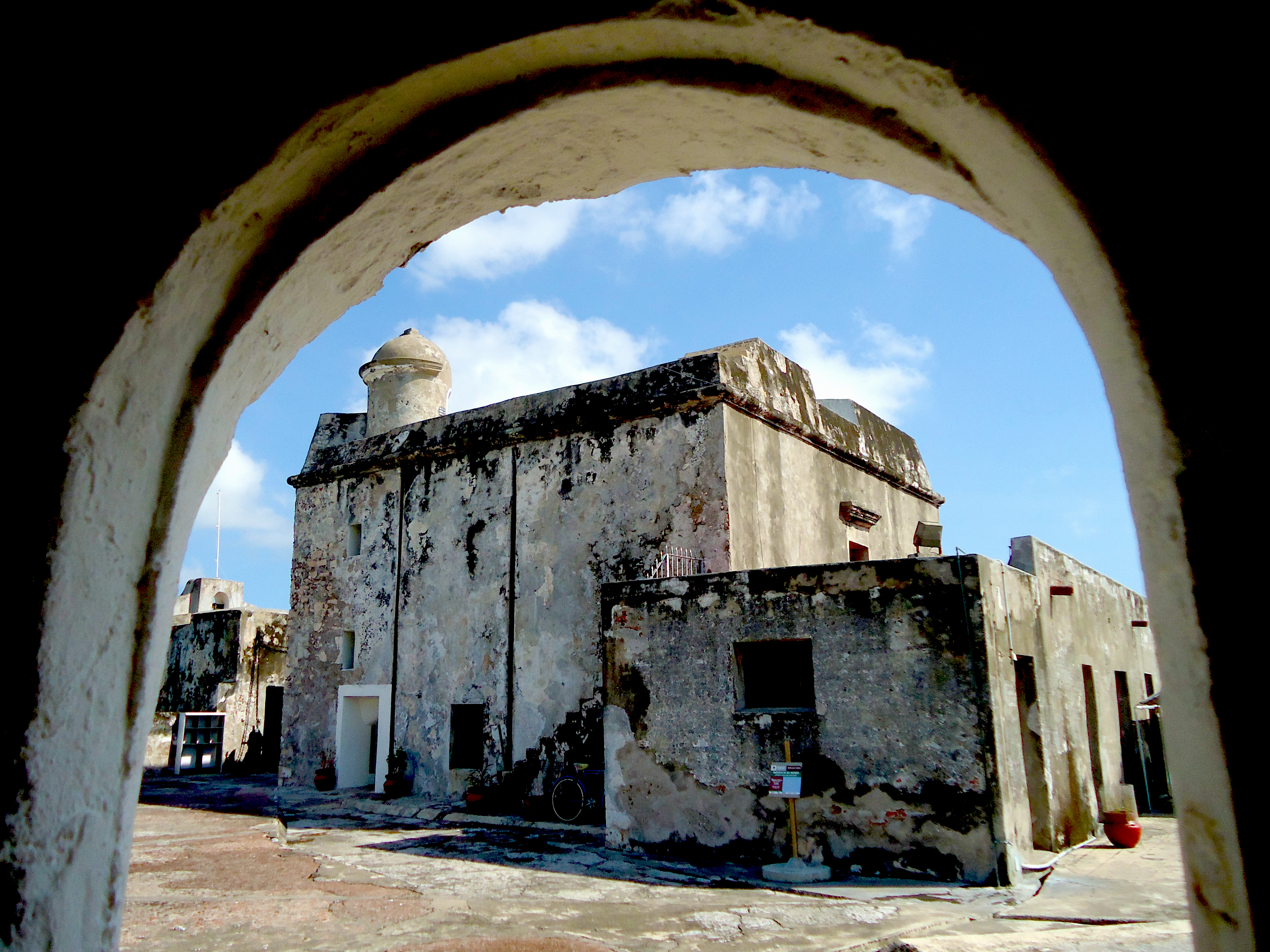
The Baluarte de Santiago

The asylum took it back and operated here for almost 100 years. New facilities were constructed for it south of the city, and the building was renovated for adaptive reuse as a museum. The City Museum was inaugurated in 1970 and contains exhibits relating to the history of Veracruz.

The Agustín Lara House Museum exhibits works, photographs and personal effects of the poet Agustín Lara, located in what was his house in Boca del Río just outside Veracruz. News clips, caricatures and a replica of the radio studio where he hosted "La Hora Azul" ("The Blue Hour") are among the items on display. Lara was one of the city's most famous sons as a popular songwriter and singer in Mexico. He began his career playing the piano in brothels and later became a bullfighter. Lara had seven wives, one of whom was Mexican screen diva María "La Doña" Félix, for whom he wrote the song "María Bonita". To be a gentleman, when he and Félix were about to break up, he married her to "make an honest woman of her" even though they had lived together for years.

=== Sports ===
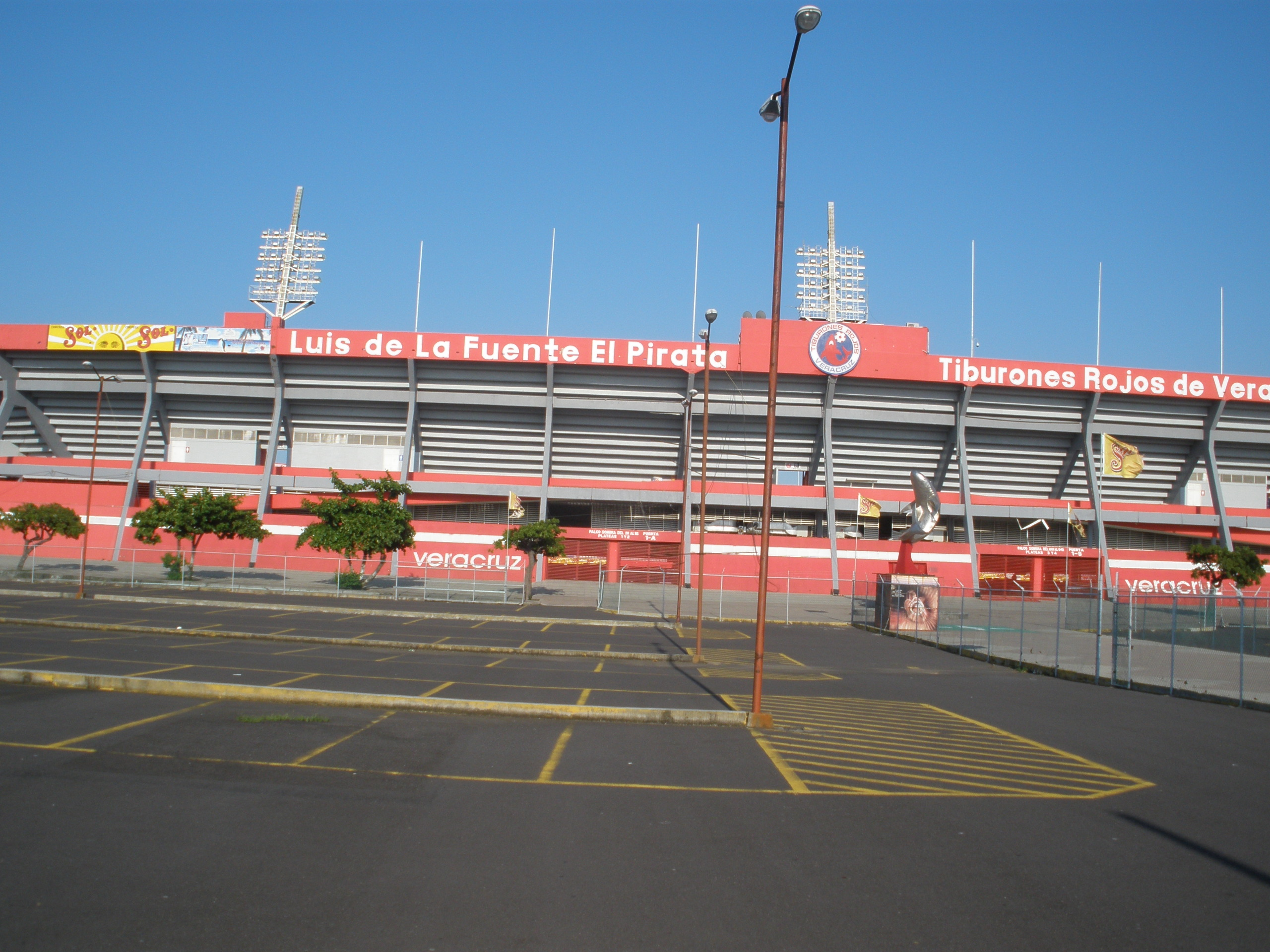
Estadio Luis "Pirata" Fuente

Football and baseball are the most popular sports in the city. C.D. Veracruz, also known as Tiburones Rojos (Red Sharks), were founded in 1943 and played at Estadio Luis "Pirata" Fuente. The team won the Mexican Primera División and the Copa MX, two times, the most recent one in 2016. However at the beginning of 2018, after a financial and administrative crisis, including one of the worst seasons for the team (41-game winless run), C.D. Veracruz was officially disaffiliated from the FMF at the beginning of the 2019 season. The team was officially dissolved at the end of the year. A new football team, Piratas F.C. was founded in April 2026, and will play in the Liga de Expansión MX, the second level division of Mexican football, during the 2026–27 season.

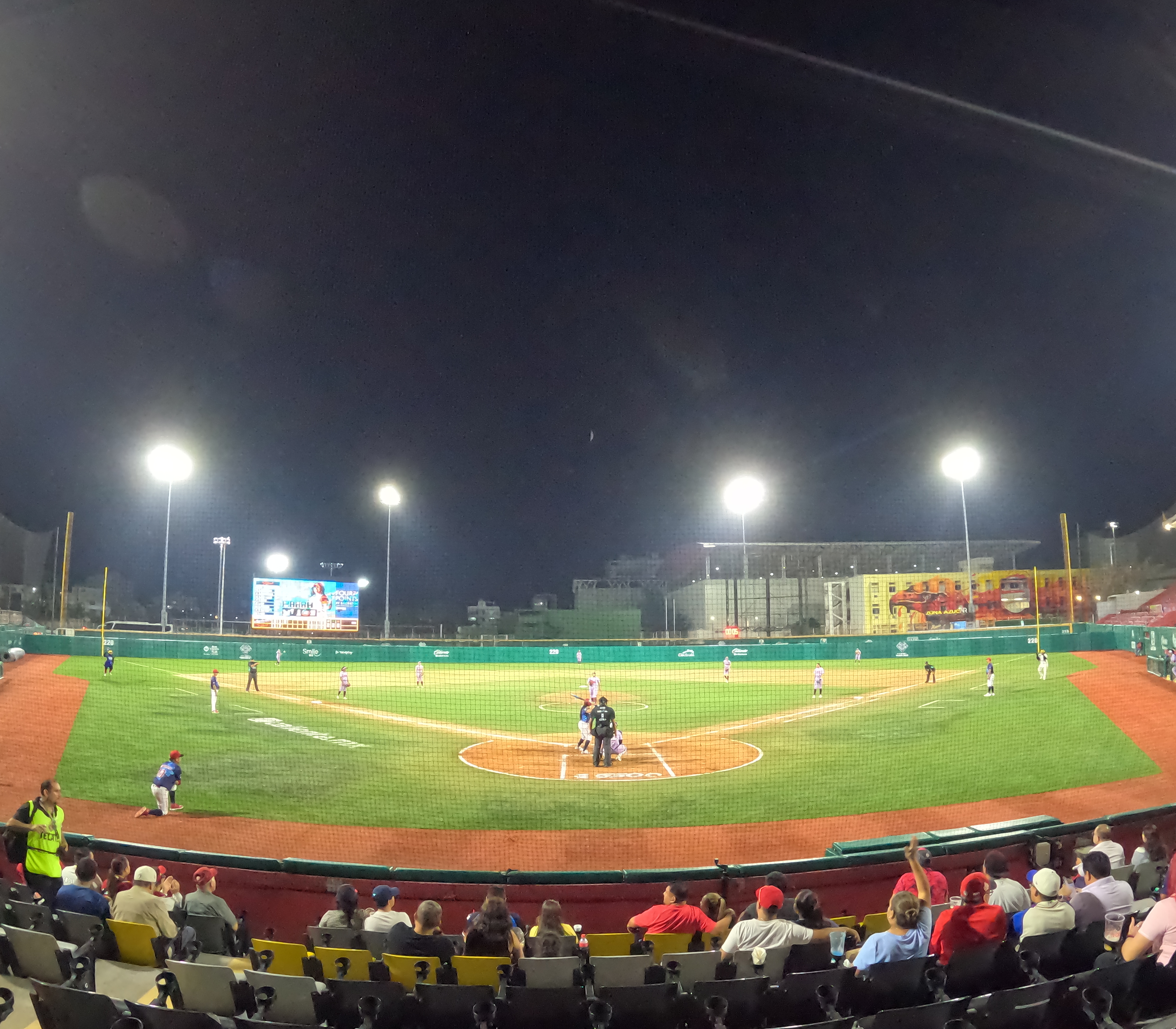
Baseball match at Estadio Universitario Beto Ávila

Baseball is also a popular sport in the city. El Águila de Veracruz competes in the Mexican Baseball League and plays in the Estadio Universitario Beto Ávila, next to the Estadio Luis "Pirata" Fuente. The team was relocated to Nuevo Laredo, Tamaulipas in 2017, after a poor attendance season, however the franchise returned to Veracruz in 2021.

The city also had a basketball team, Halcones Rojos Veracruz, which played at Auditorio Benito Juárez and competed in the Liga Nacional de Baloncesto Profesional (LNBP). The team won the LNBP at the 2011–12 and 2013–14 seasons. However, at the end of 2025, the team was officially dissolved.

== Economy ==
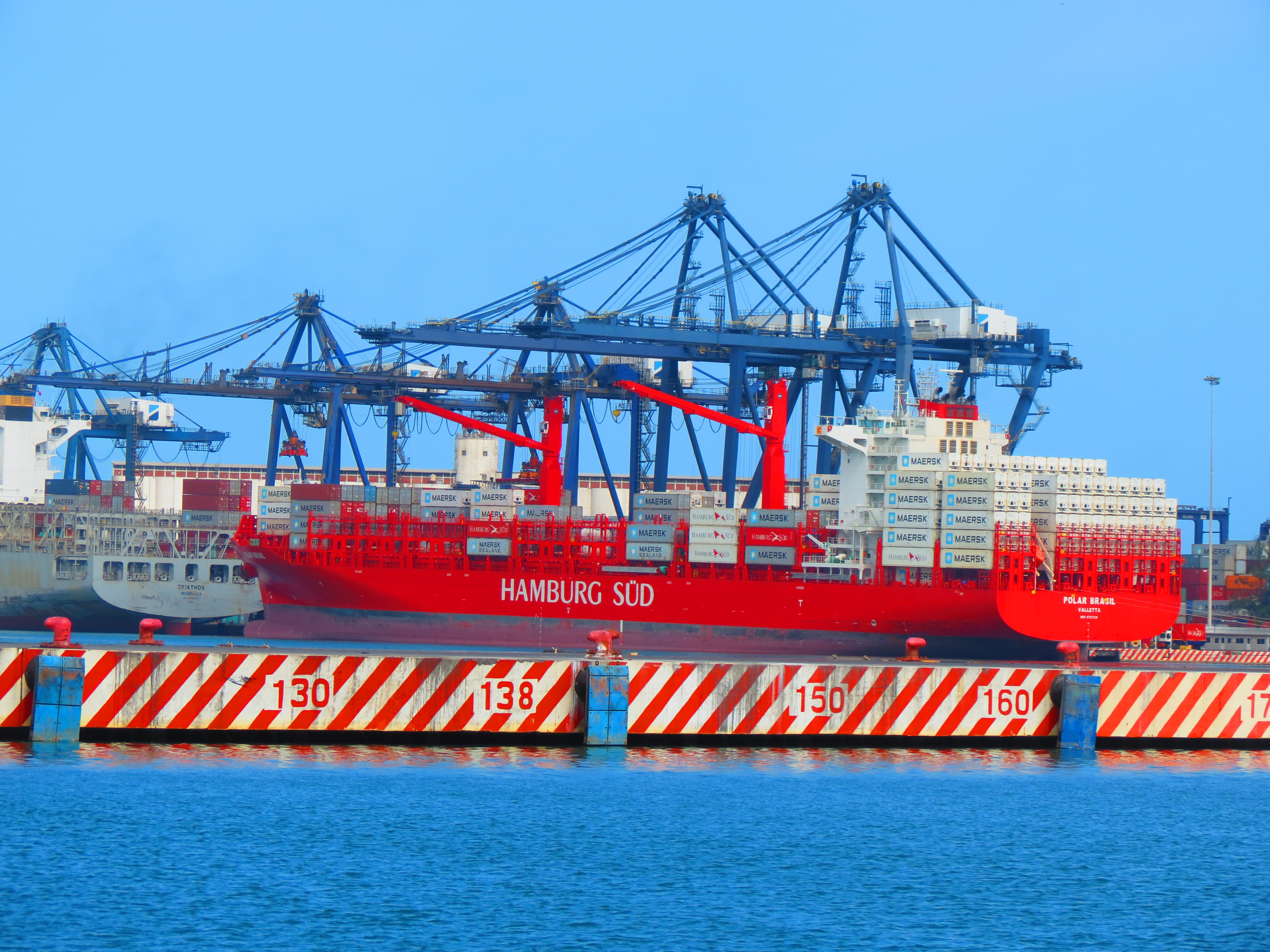
The port of Veracruz is the largest and most important in Mexico

Laguna Verde Nuclear Power Plant (LVNPP) in located near Alto Lucero. Veracruz, produces about 4.5% of Mexico's electrical energy.

=== Port of Veracruz ===
The Port of Veracruz is the oldest and largest port in Mexico, deeply important to its history. During the colonial period, it was the most important port in New Spain, the connection to ports and the Atlantic trade creating a large wealthy merchant class, which was more prosperous than that of Mexico City. From the port of Veracruz were exported turkeys, corn, beans, avocados, and cotton to Spain. From Spain came fava beans, wheat, rice, cattle, pigs, fabric, wine and other goods. In the mid 16th century, so much gold and silver was found in Veracruz that these precious metals were the chief export to Spain on what were called treasure ships commonly known as Spanish treasure fleet. The bounty attracted pirates, mostly from Britain and Holland, such as Francis Drake and John Hawkins, who preyed on such ships. Veracruz was invaded during conflicts with France and the United States.

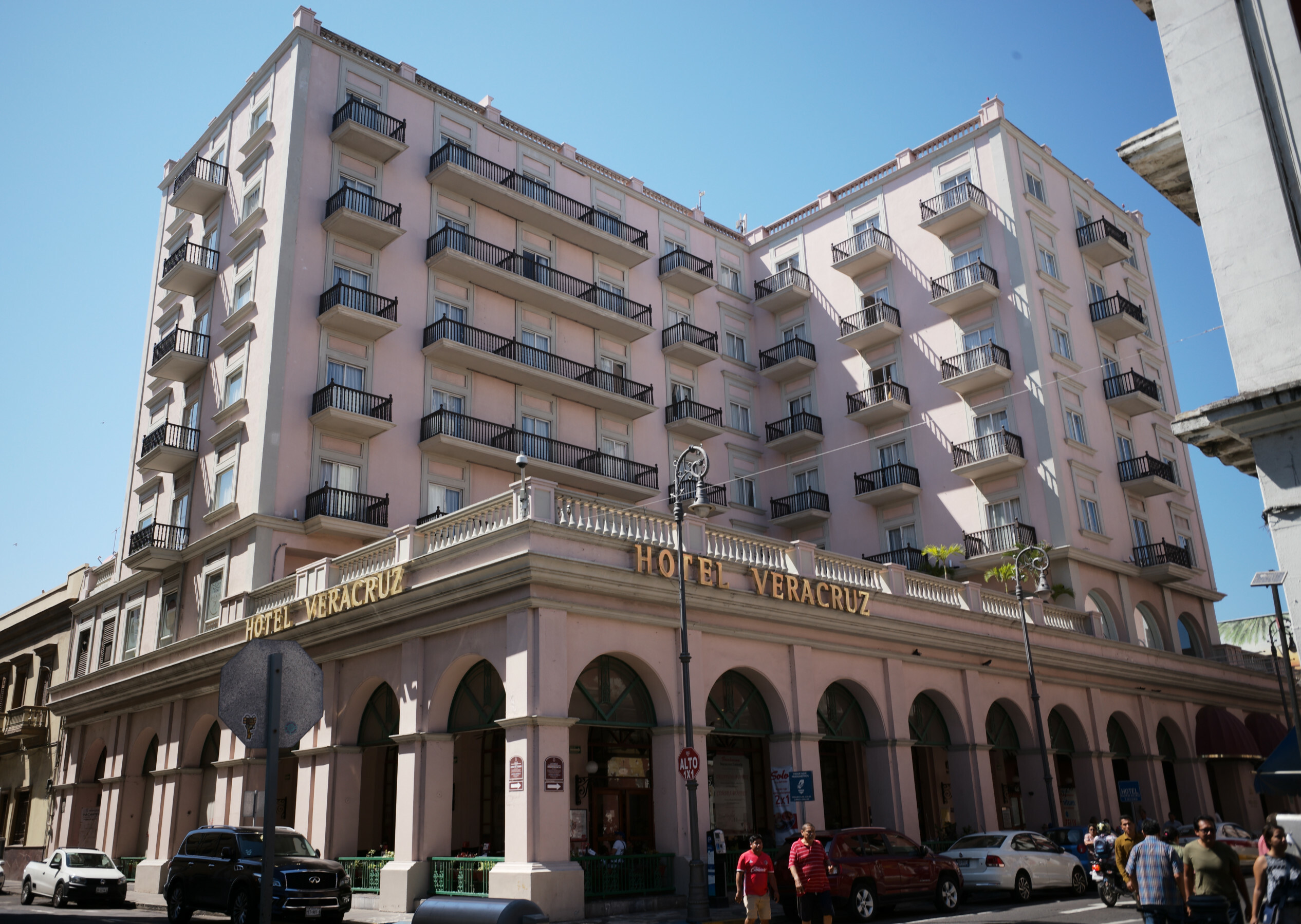
Hotel in Veracruz's historic center

In the latter half of the 19th century, Veracruz's importance waned as trade to Europe diminished. The port was refurbished at the beginning of the 20th century, but petroleum production was the primary income for the state rather than the port. This began to change in the latter half of the 20th century, and the port has surged back to the state's economic forefront.

In 1991, the federal government took over the port of Veracruz to correct the handling of merchandise. Later that same year, the first private shipping companies began operations. In 1993, the Law of Ports was passed regularizing the operations of ports in the country. This law created the Administración Portuaria de Veracruz (Port Authority of Veracruz).

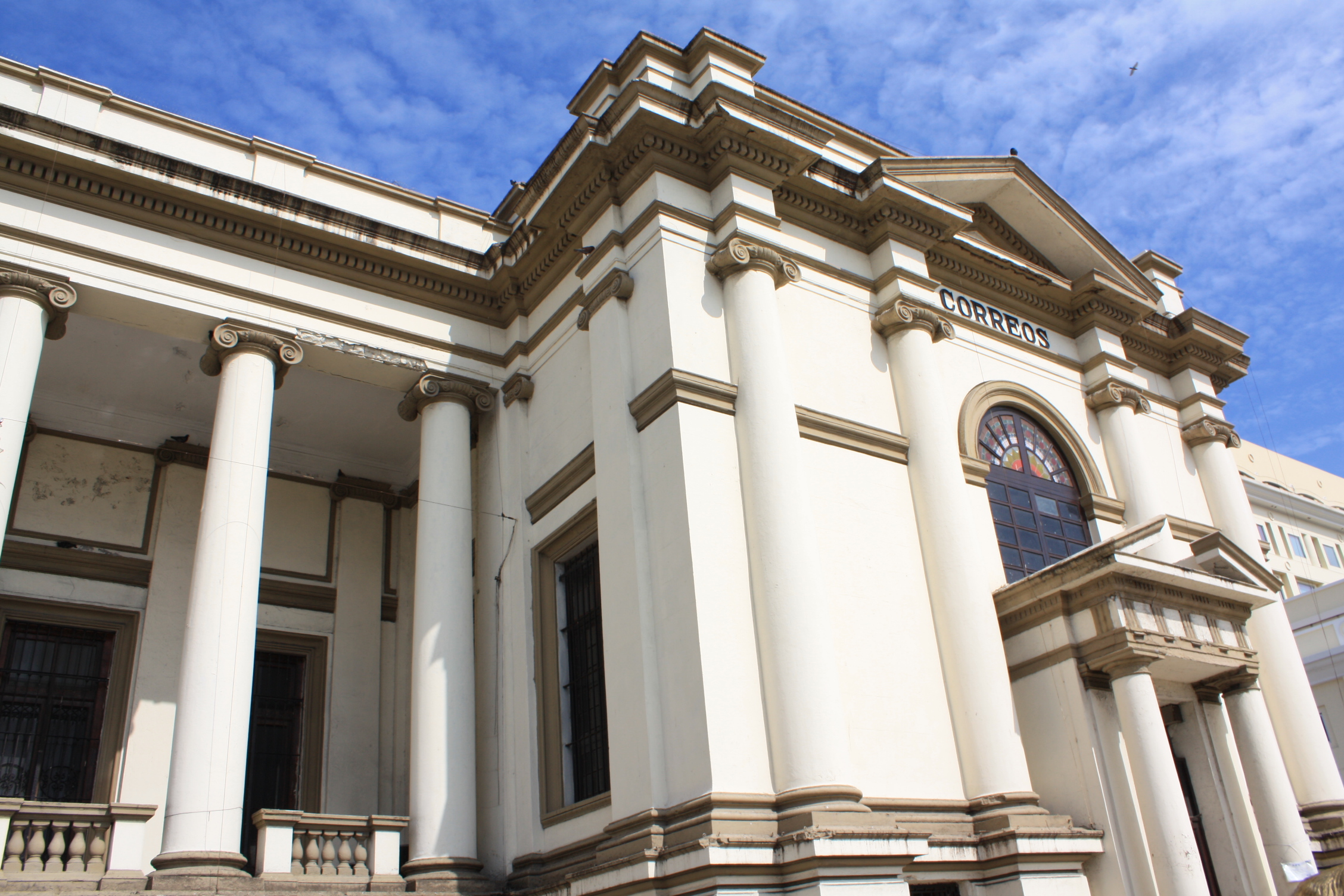
Historic post office of Veracruz

In the 2000s, the port continues to handle all kinds of cargo. This is expected to rise once modernization efforts have finished, especially a truck bypass that leads directly from the highway to the port. Veracruz is the gateway for Mexico's automobile industry, which is concentrated in the center of the country, in the states around Mexico City. This port has several advantages. It is the first to be equipped specifically for shipping automobiles. Located on the south-central coast, Veracruz is closer to car manufacturers and has better access to both import and export markets in the U.S., Europe, Central and South America than other Mexican ports. In 2004, the port handled 70% of the automobiles exported. With traffic expected to rise, the port authorities unveiled a program to enlarge the port's infrastructure and expand operations by 2010. However conversion of port area for tourism challenges operations. The port handles 700,000 to 800,000 vehicles per year; the largest volume on the continent.

== Education ==
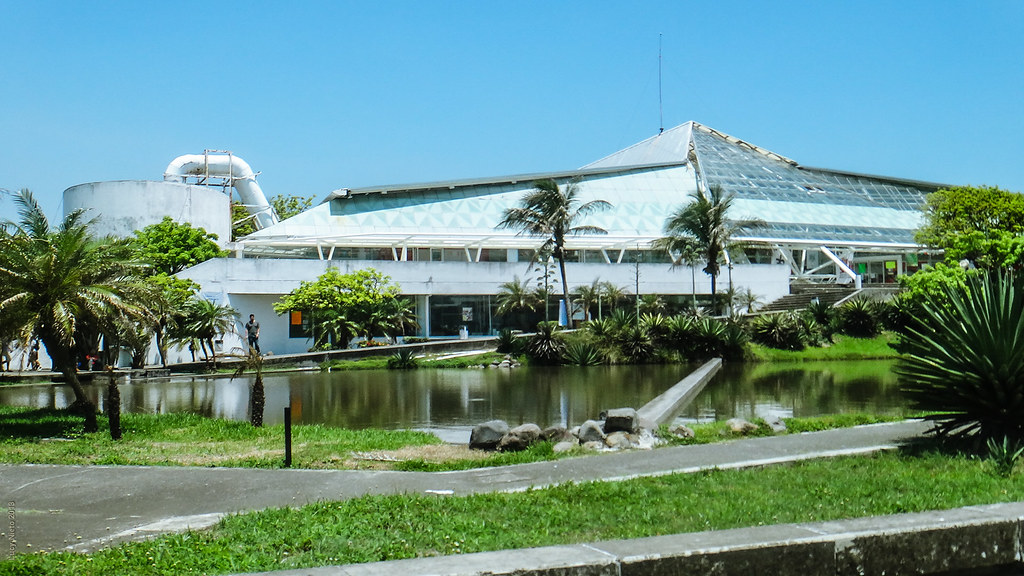
Universidad Veracruzana

The Universidad Veracruzana was established in 1944. It was created by joining a number of professional and higher education establishments together. It is now the main center of higher education in the state of Veracruz, with five campuses and twenty-two satellite locations in the state. The student population is approximately 70,000, offering degrees in sixty different fields.

Private universities include Cristóbal Colón University, mainly dedicated to architecture and administration. UNIMEX was founded in 1991 and focuses on marketing, graphic design and law.

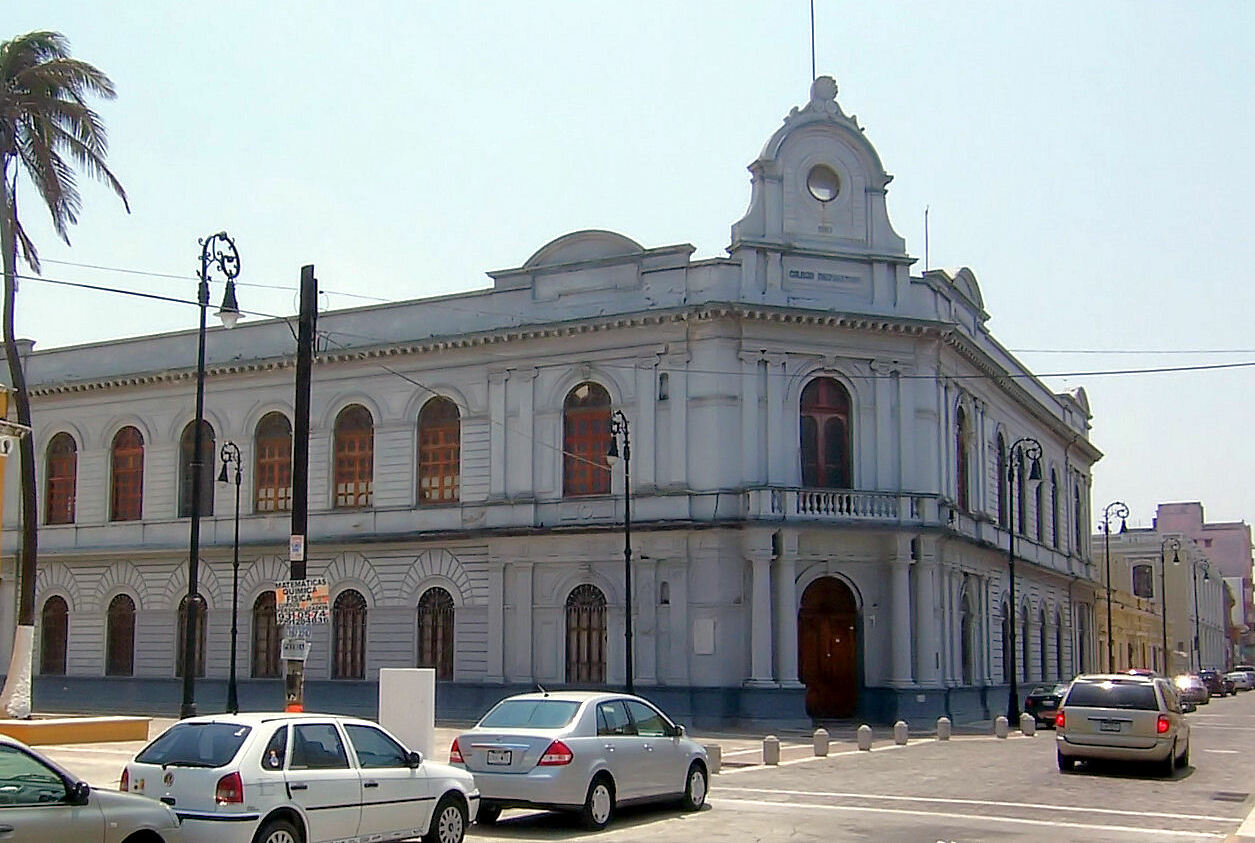
Ilustre Instituto Veracruzano

The Veracruz Institute of Technology was founded in 1946 by Ismael Lagunes Lastra. It started out as the School of Arts and Letters, with a mission to train students for the jobs associated with the developing port and industrial base of the city. It started teaching students at the secondary and high school level, later adding bachelor's degree programs. In 1952, the school received a grant of lands by the federal and state governments to expand. Technical programs were added in the 1960s and have become the main part of the school's work, Veracruz Institute of Technology is famous due to its bachelor of engineering in biochemical engineering, masters and PhD about food science and biochemical engineering.

The Ilustre Instituto Veracruzano (Illustrious Veracruzan Institute) was founded in 1853.

== Transportation ==
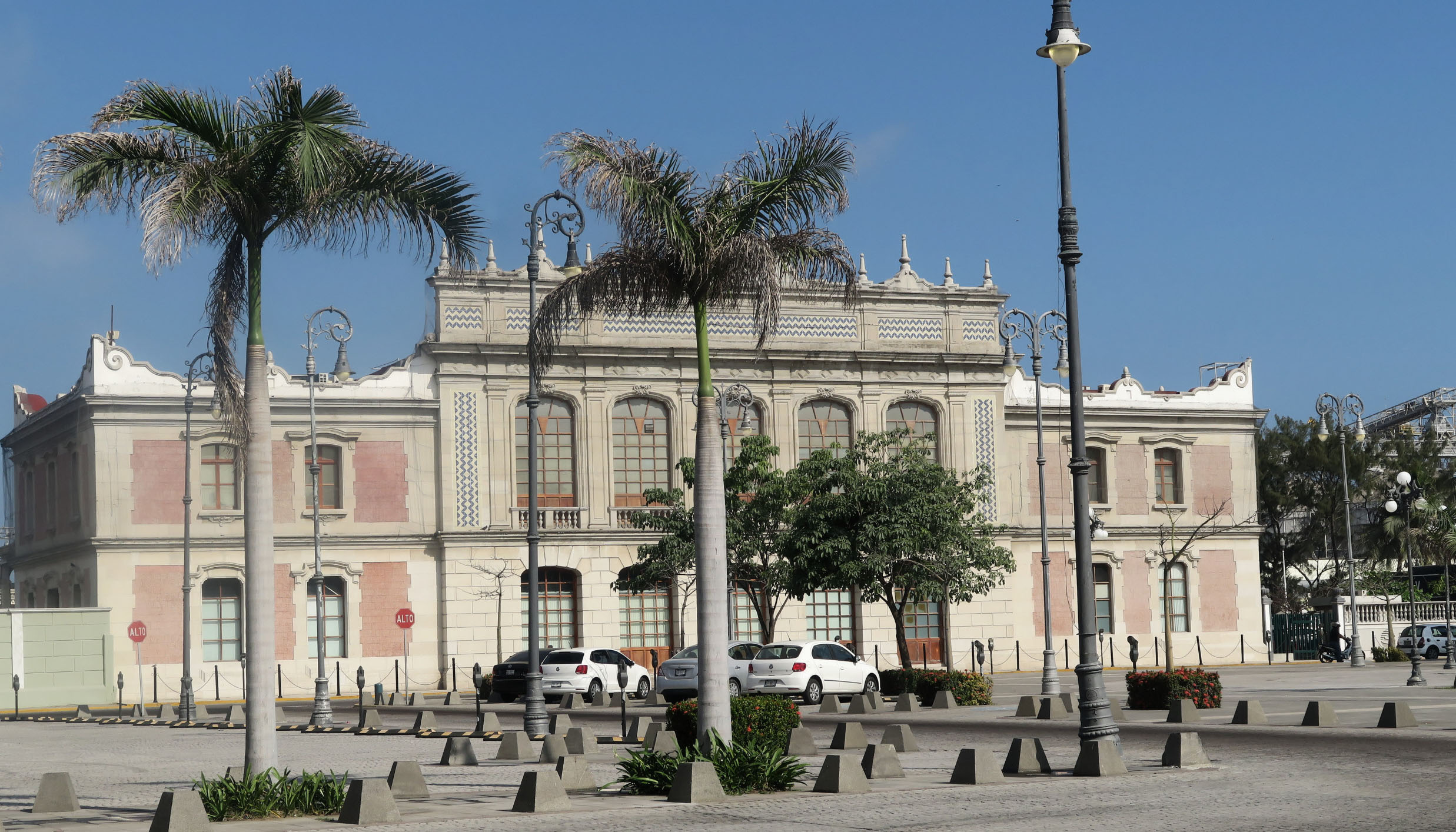
Veracruz Train Depot

Veracruz International Airport serves the city with daily service to Mexico City as well as international service to Dallas Fort Worth and Houston. The commercial passenger airlines to currently serve VER airport are Aeroméxico, United Airlines, American Airlines, Viva, Volaris and Aerus. In 2023, the airport handled 1,665,694 passengers.

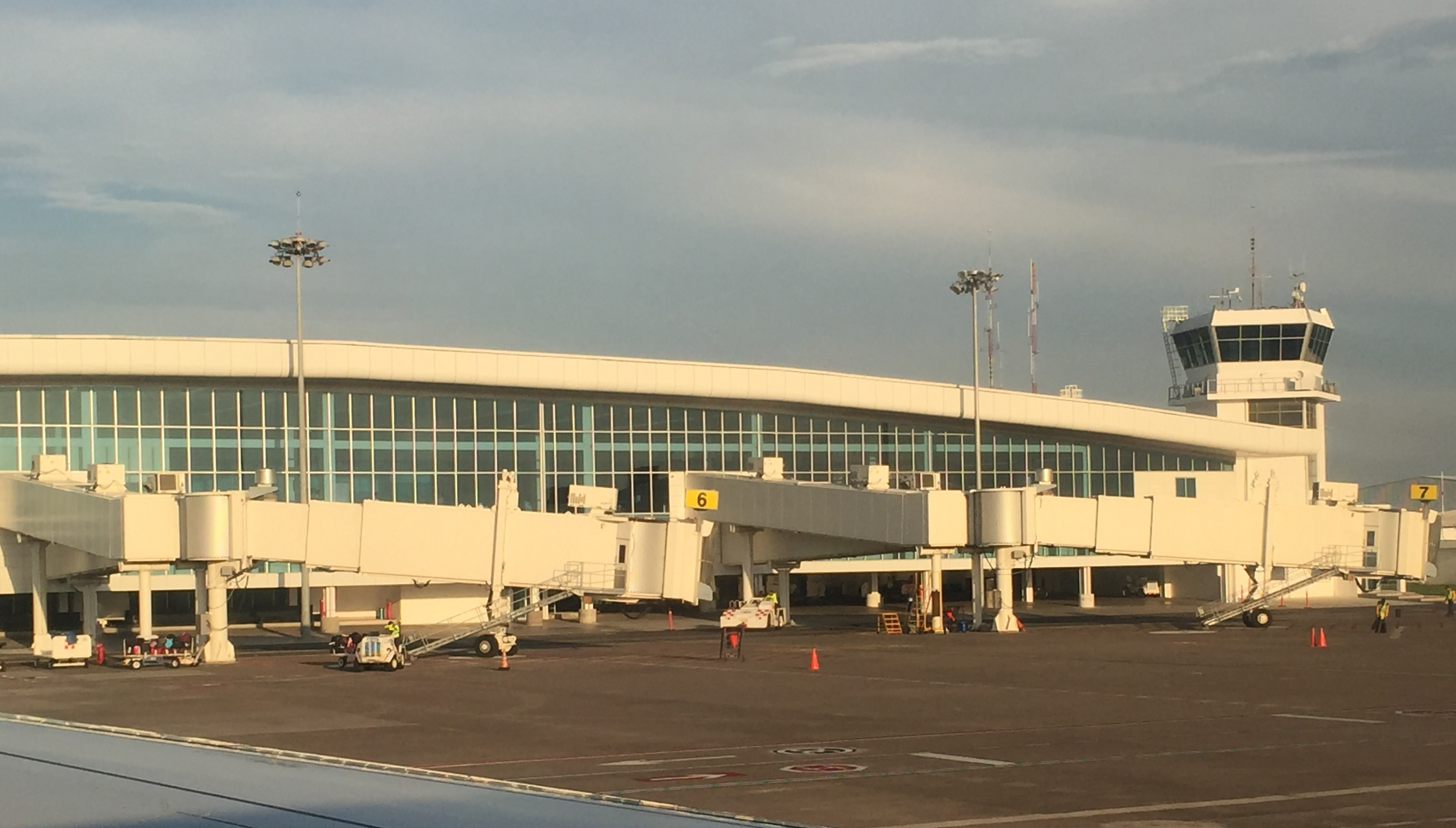
Veracruz International Airport

Non-passenger rail transport (Kansas City Southern de México) connects Veracruz with Mexico City and the state capital, Xalapa.

Veracruz is linked to Mexico City by a four-lane toll highway which also passes through Córdoba and Puebla. Halfway between Veracruz and Córdoba, it is connected to the La Tinaja-Cosoleacaque toll highway which goes as far as Villahermosa, Tabasco. Another toll highway goes to Xalapa.

Urban transport formerly was provided by the Veracruz tram system, from 1908 to 1981. The city has buses, including trolley-replica tour buses that resemble former trams.

== Sister cities ==
Veracruz is twinned with:

- Cádiz, Spain
- Callao, Peru
- Galveston, United States
- Havana, Cuba
- Laredo, United States
- Miami-Dade County, United States
- Mobile, United States
- Ordes, Spain
- Oviedo, Spain
- Pharr, United States
- Quetzaltenango, Guatemala
- San Jose, United States
- Santos, Brazil
- Seville, Spain
- Tampa, United States
- Valencia, Spain
- Valparaíso, Chile

== Notable people ==
- Adolfo Ruiz Cortines (1889–1973), president of Mexico from 1952 to 1958

== See also ==
- Boca del Río, Veracruz
- Veracruz Canyon
