= Veracruz metropolitan area =

- Metropolitan Area
- Zona Metropolitana de Veracruz (Spanish)
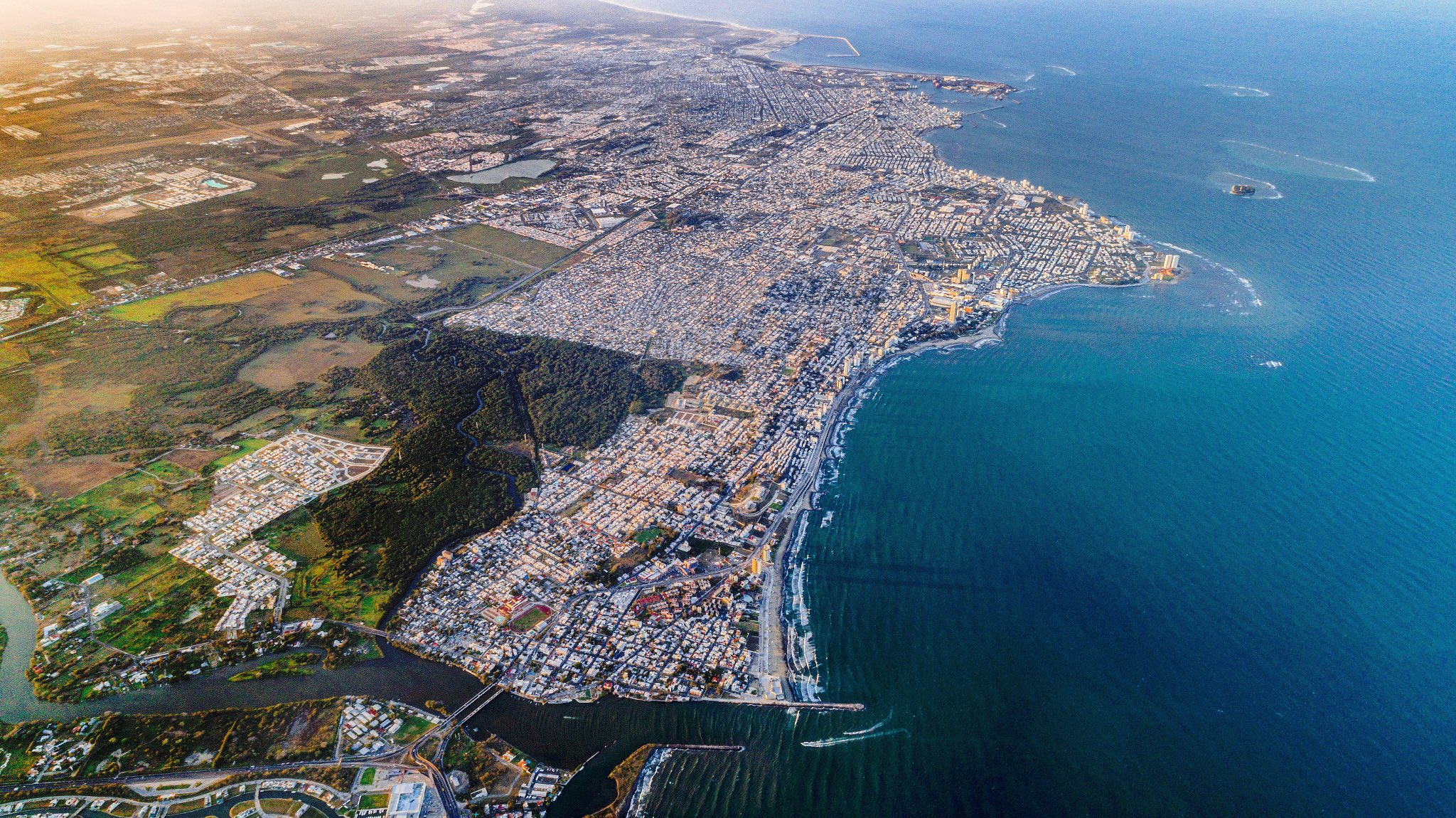
- Aerial view of Veracruz Metropolitan Area

- Seal
Interactive Map of Veracruz Metropolitan Area
City of Veracruz / Ciudad de Veracruz
Veracruz Metro Area / Zona Metropolitana
- Country: Mexico
- State: Veracruz
- Principal city: Veracruz
- Other cities: Boca del Río; Medellín; Alvarado; Jamapa; Manlio Fabio Altamirano

Area
  - Total: 1,888.8 km^{2} (729.3 sq mi)

Population (2020)
  - Total: 939,046
  - Density: 497.17/km^{2} (1,287.7/sq mi)
- Time zone: UTC-6 (CST)

The Veracruz metropolitan area (Zona metropolitana de Veracruz, ZMV) is a metropolitan area in Veracruz (state), Mexico formed by the city of Veracruz and its Veracruz municipality and five other municipalities.

According to the 2020 Census by the INEGI and published in 2021, the Veracruz metropolitan area had 939,046 inhabitants, the twentieth largest in Mexico, and in the most populated of the state of Veracruz. It fits to stand out that it presents a populational growth sustained #turn an axis of the region, since it considers him like the most important of the State of Veracruz and also of the Gulf of Mexico.

== Component municipios and localidades ==
The metropolitan area consists of 6 municipalities, roughly equivalent to U.S. counties in that they each contain multiple (localidades, places) such as cities, towns, and villages.

Municipality
Veracruz
Boca del Río
Medellín
Alvarado
Jamapa
Manlio Fabio Altamirano

=== Localidades ===
The 15 largest localidades are:

Localidad	Municipio	Population
Veracruz (localidad, Veracruz mun.)	Veracruz	607,209
Veracruz (localidad, Boca del Río mun.)	Boca del Río	144,550
Valente Díaz	Veracruz	36,818
Fraccionamiento Puente Moreno	Medellín	34,913
Lomas de Río Medio Cuatro	Veracruz	20,849
Alvarado	Alvarado	20,797
Fraccionamiento Geovillas los Pinos	Veracruz	16,855
Las Amapolas	Veracruz	15,076
Hacienda Sotavento	Veracruz	11,583
El Tejar	Medellín	11,144
Los Torrentes	Veracruz	10,870
Boca del Río	Boca del Río	9,988
Colinas de Santa Fe	Veracruz	9,205
Fraccionamiento Arboledas San Ramón	Medellín	8,894
Valle Alto	Veracruz	6,688

== Gallery ==
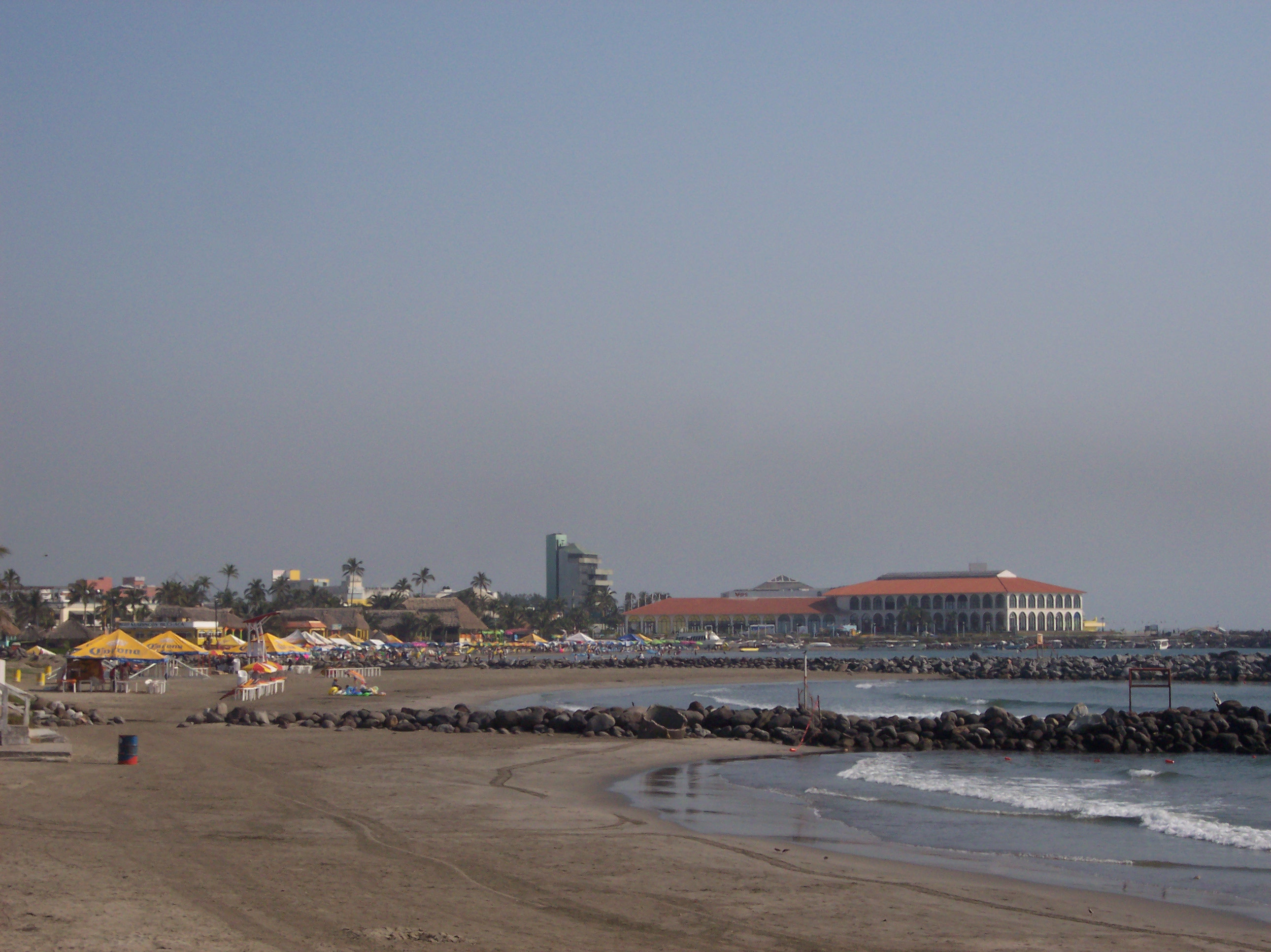
Playa Villa del Mar, Veracruz

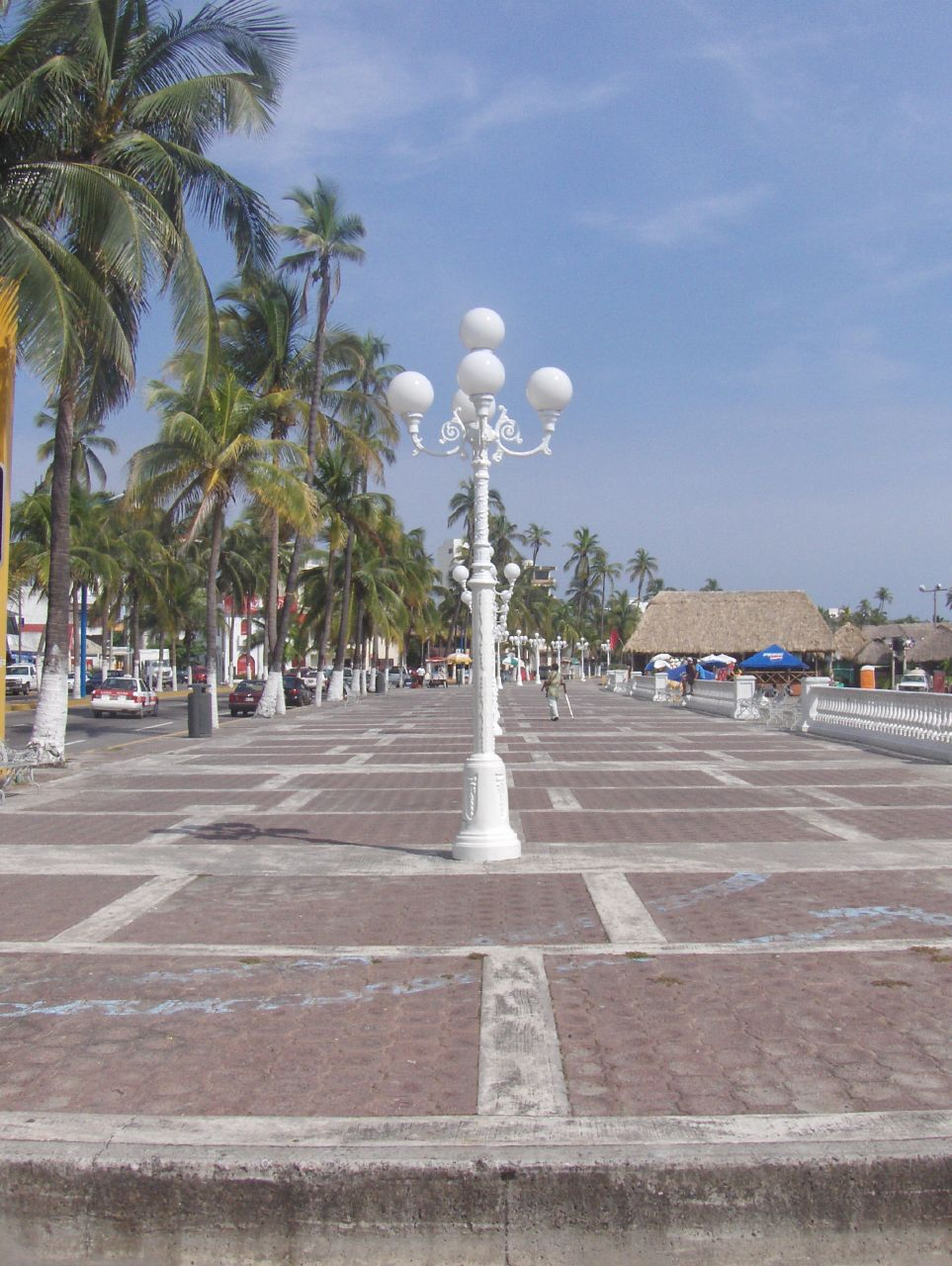
Boulevard Manuel Ávila Camacho, Veracruz

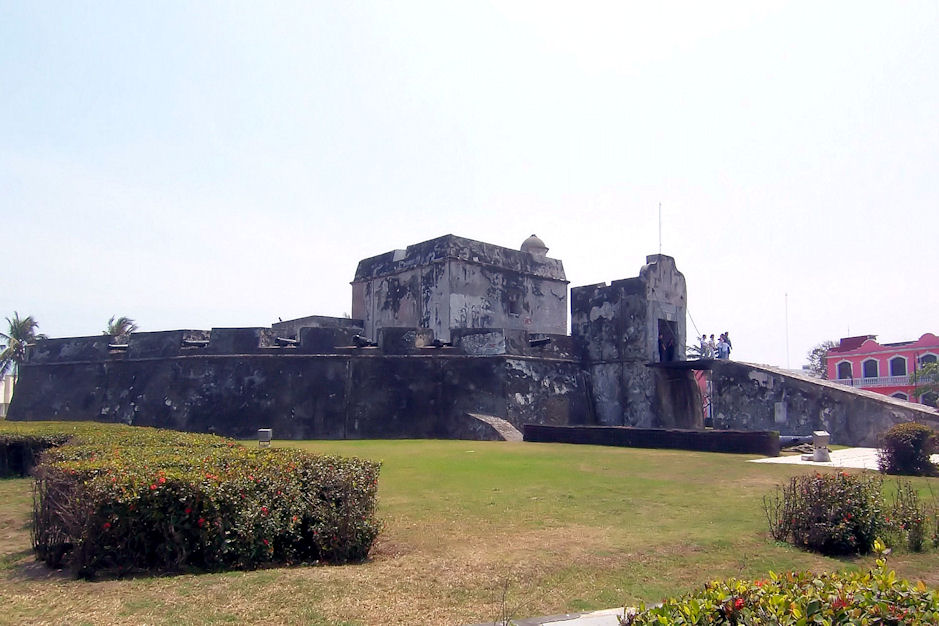
Baluarte de Santiago, Veracruz

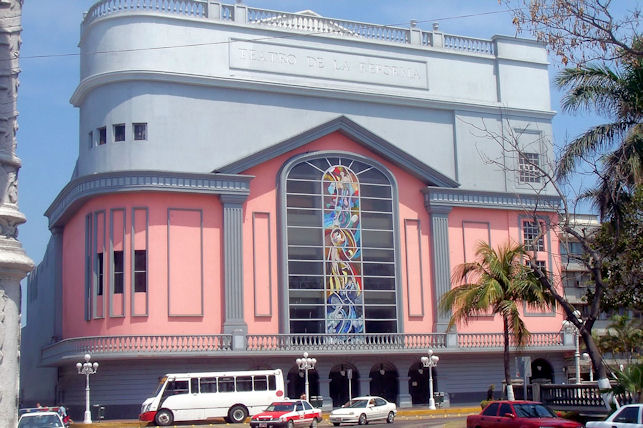
Teatro de la Reforma, Veracruz

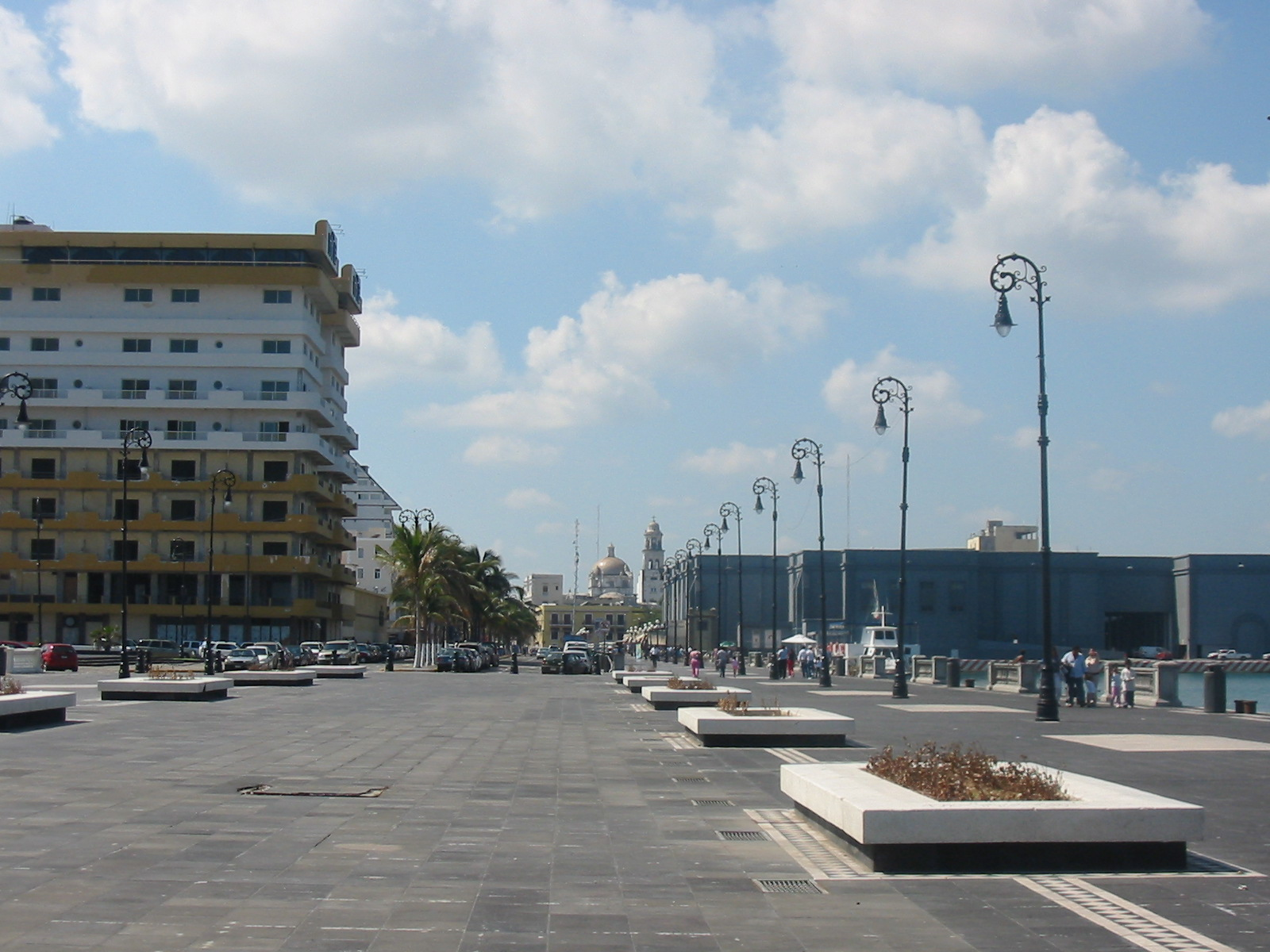
Malecón, Veracruz

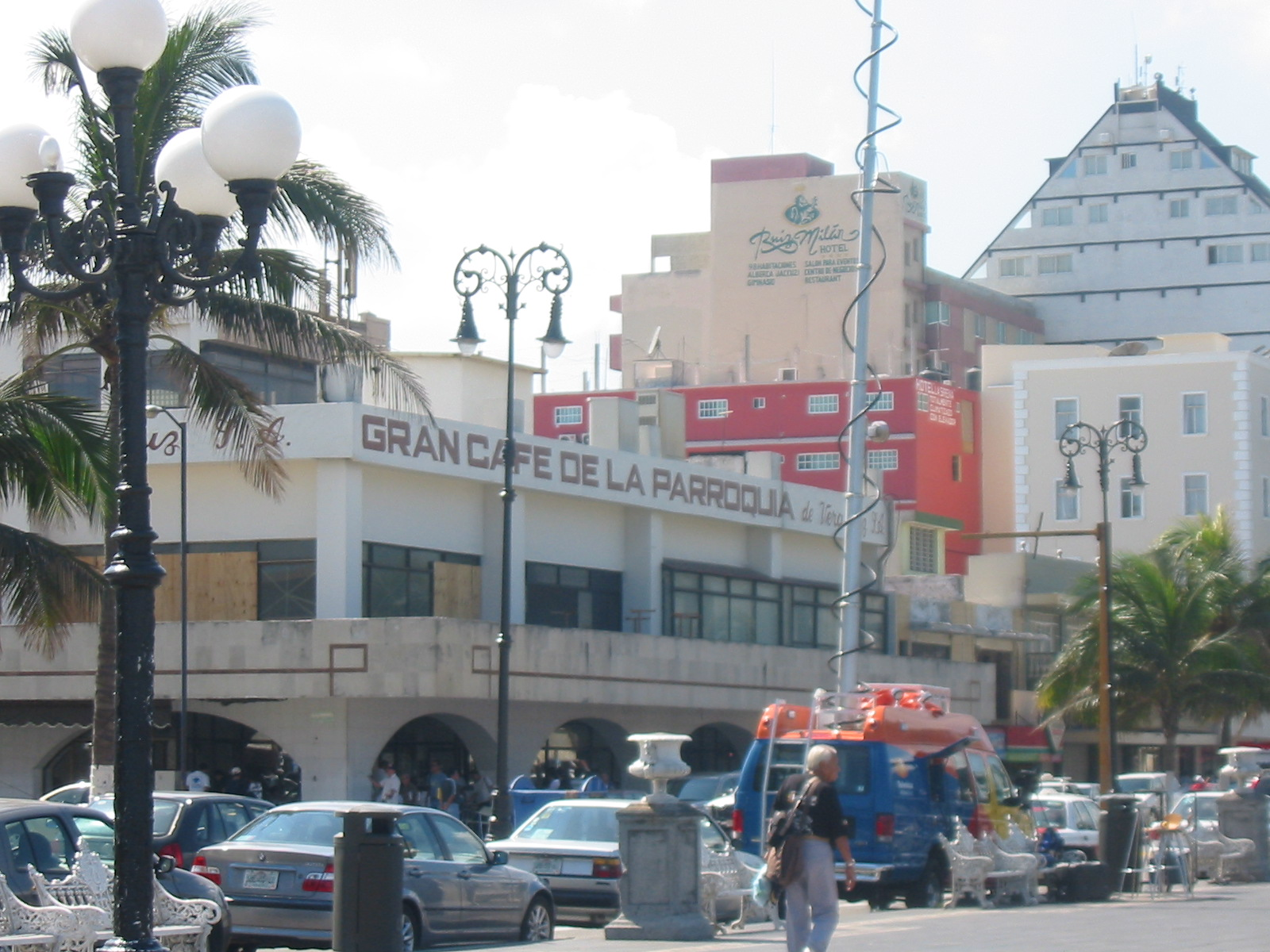
Gran Café de La Parroquia, Veracruz

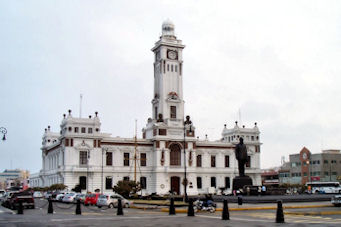
Faro de Venustiano Carranza, Veracruz

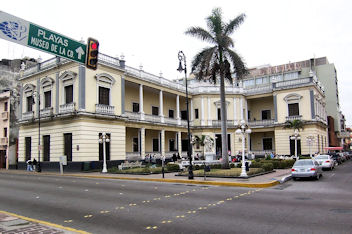
Registro Civil, Veracruz

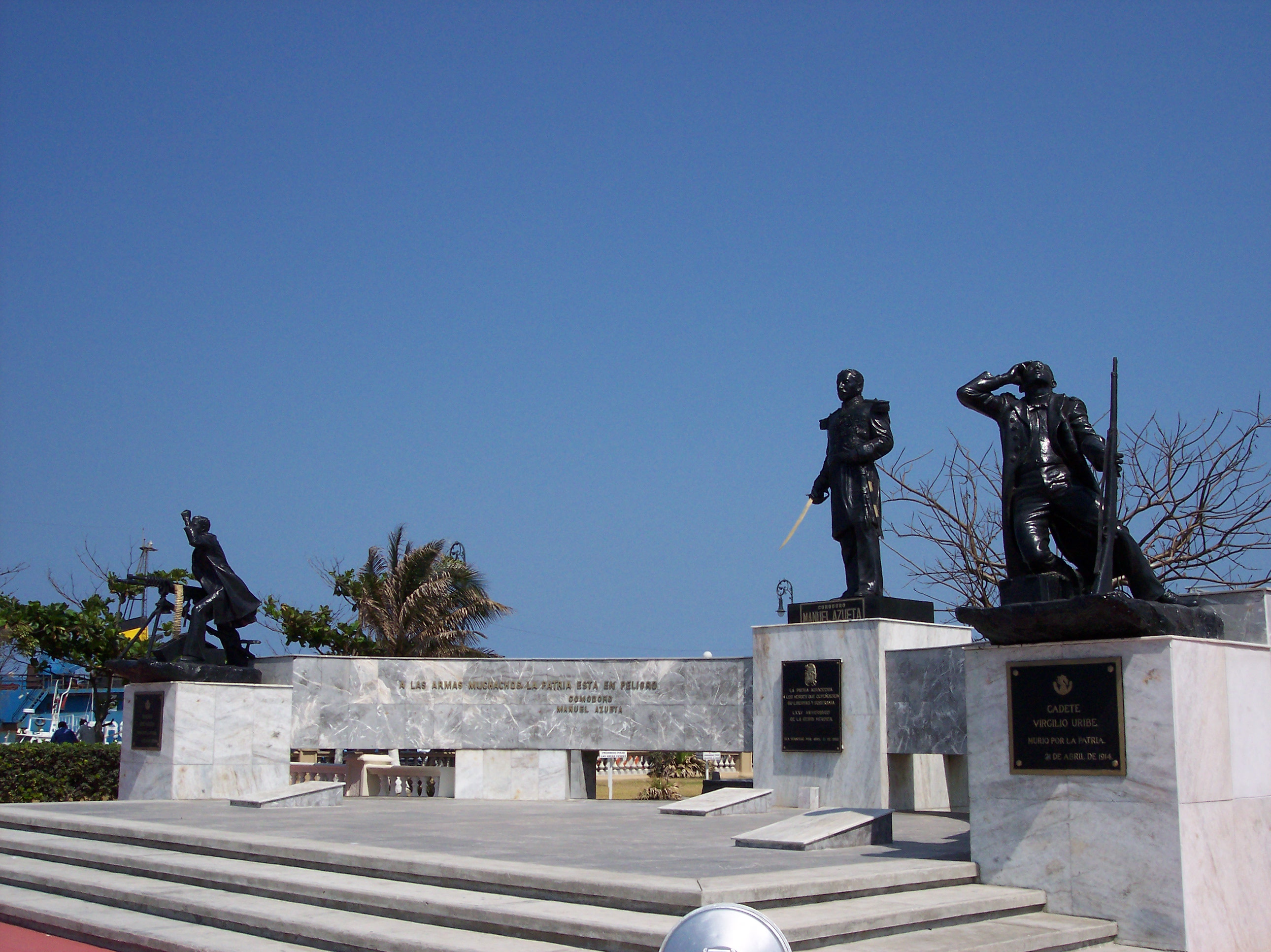
Monument to the defense against the U.S. invasion of Veracruz of 1914^{(es)}

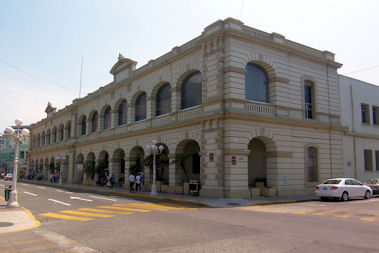
Palacio Federal, Veracruz

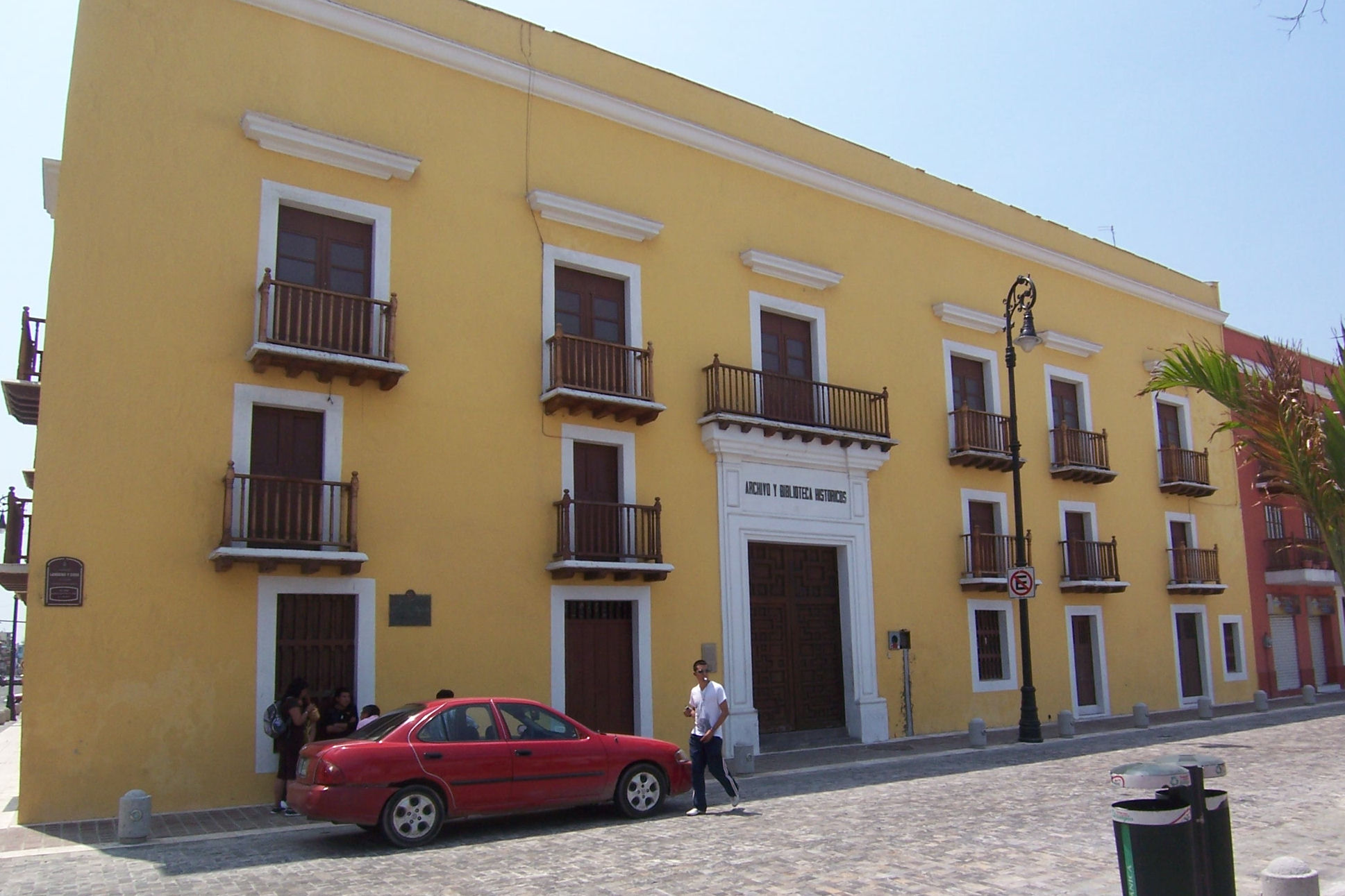
Archives and library, Veracruz

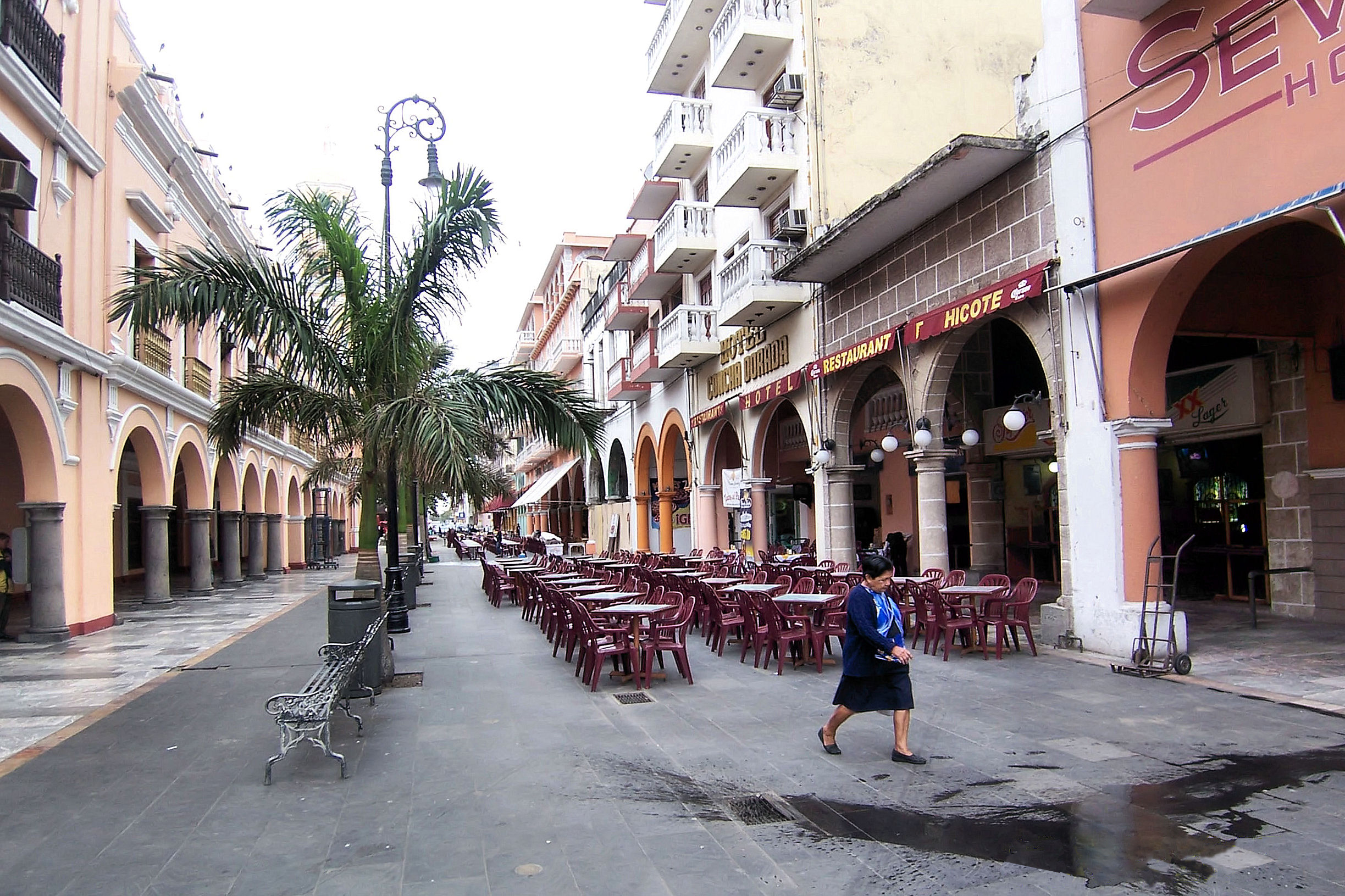
Los portales de Lerdo, Veracruz

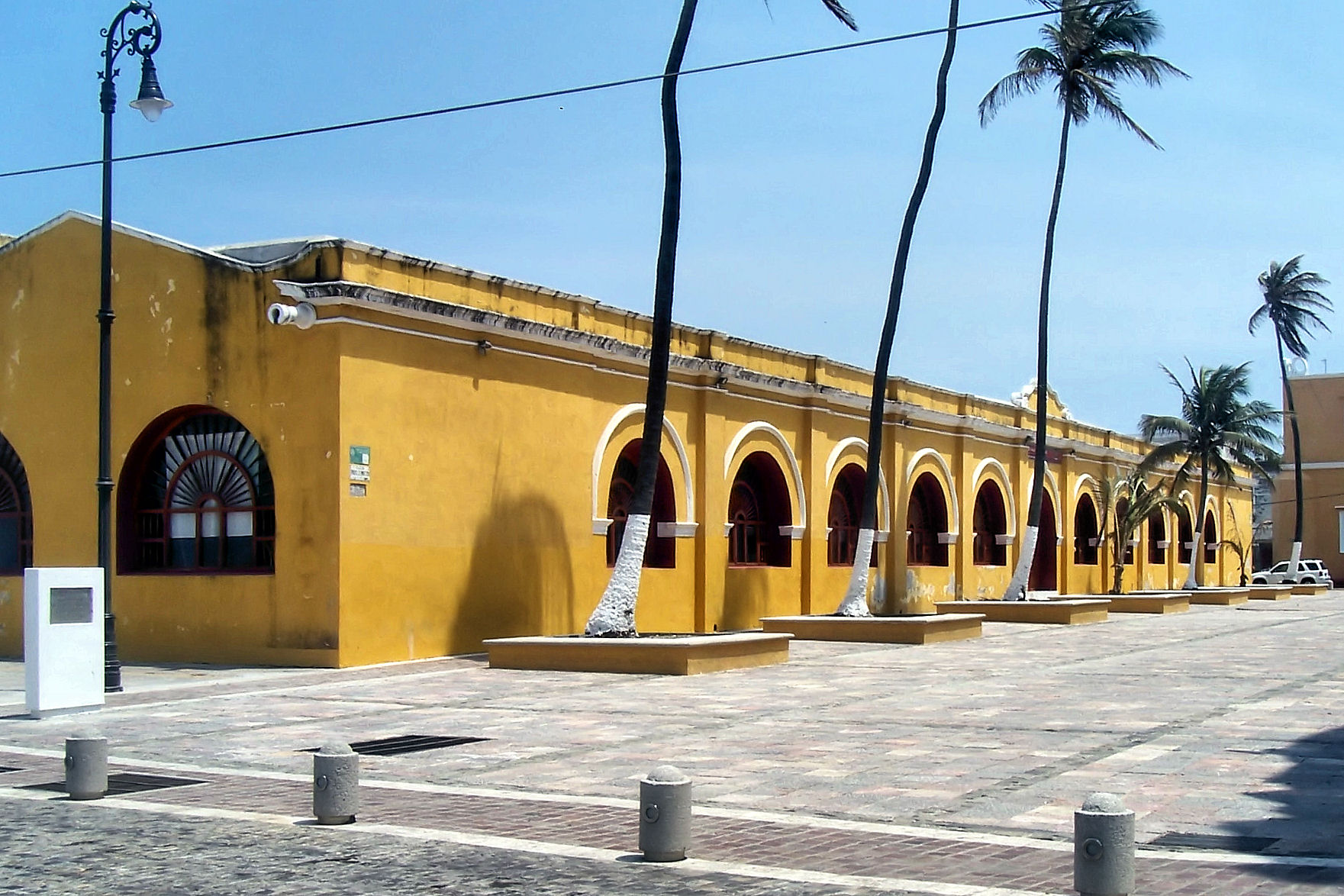
Las Atarazanas, Veracruz

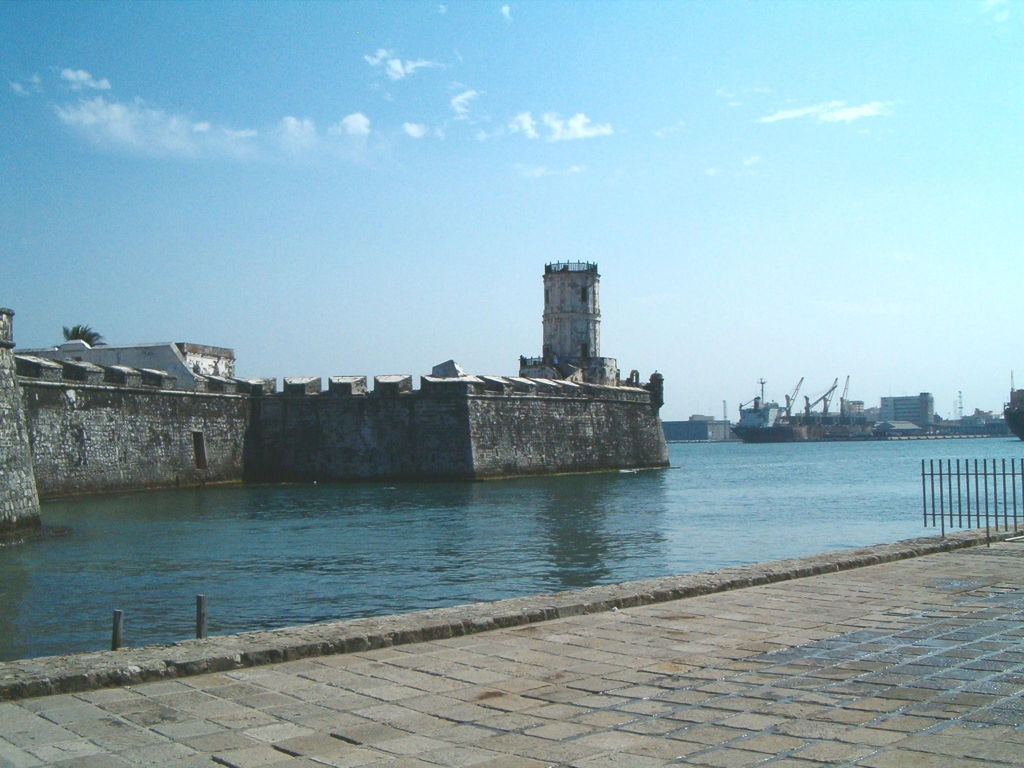
Fortaleza de San Juan de Ulúa, Veracruz

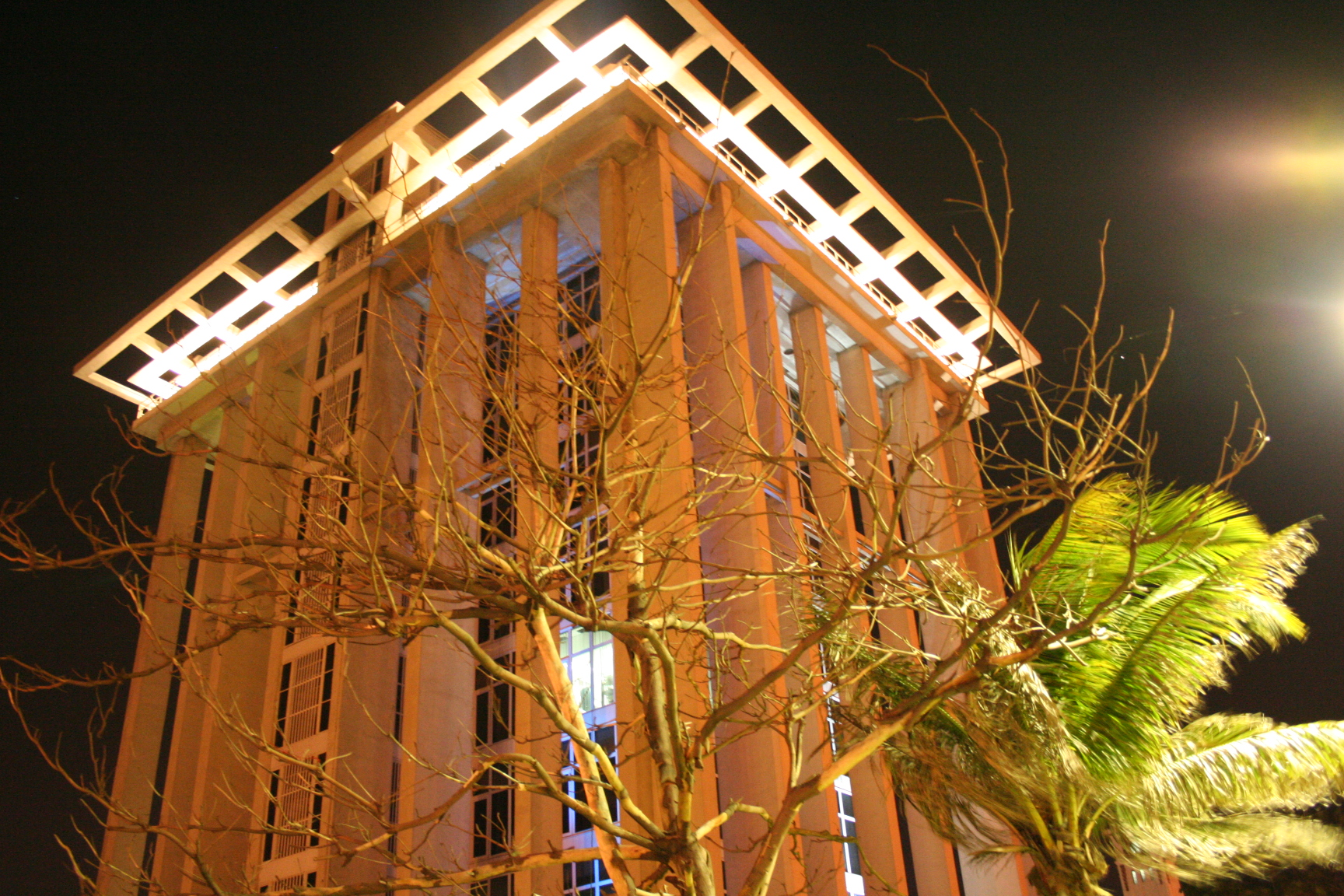
Torre de PEMEX tower, Veracruz

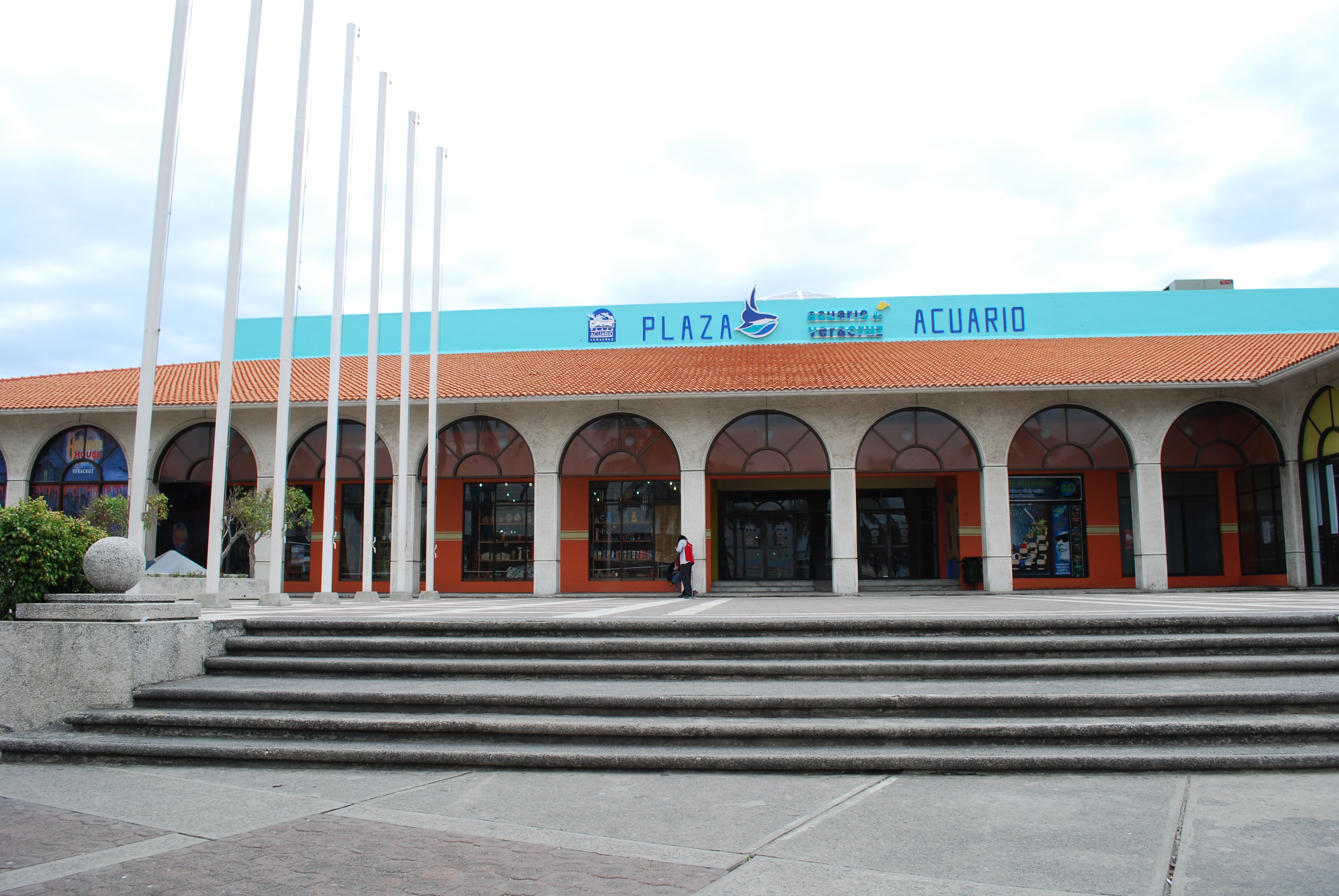
Aquarium, Veracruz

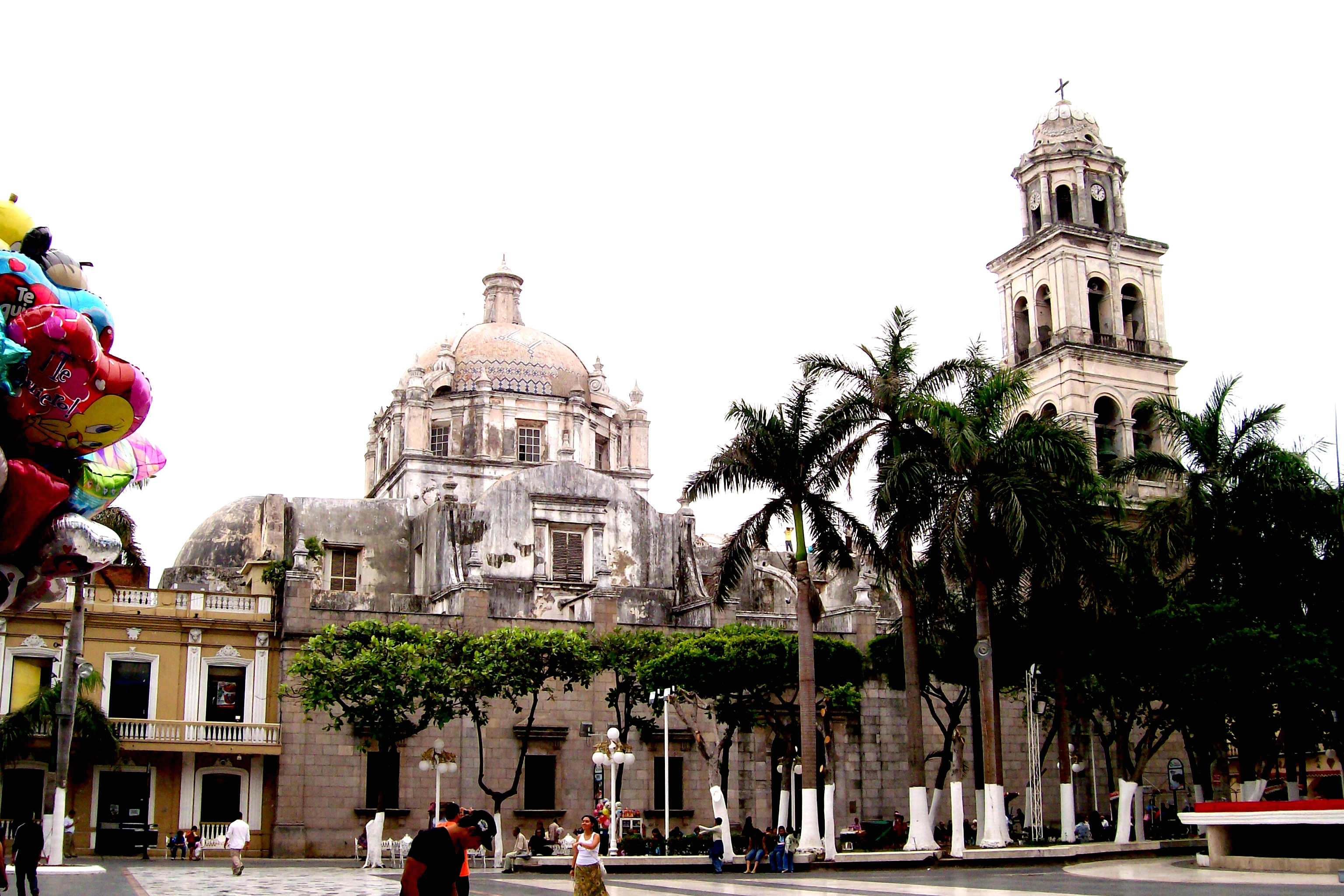
Cathedral, Veracruz

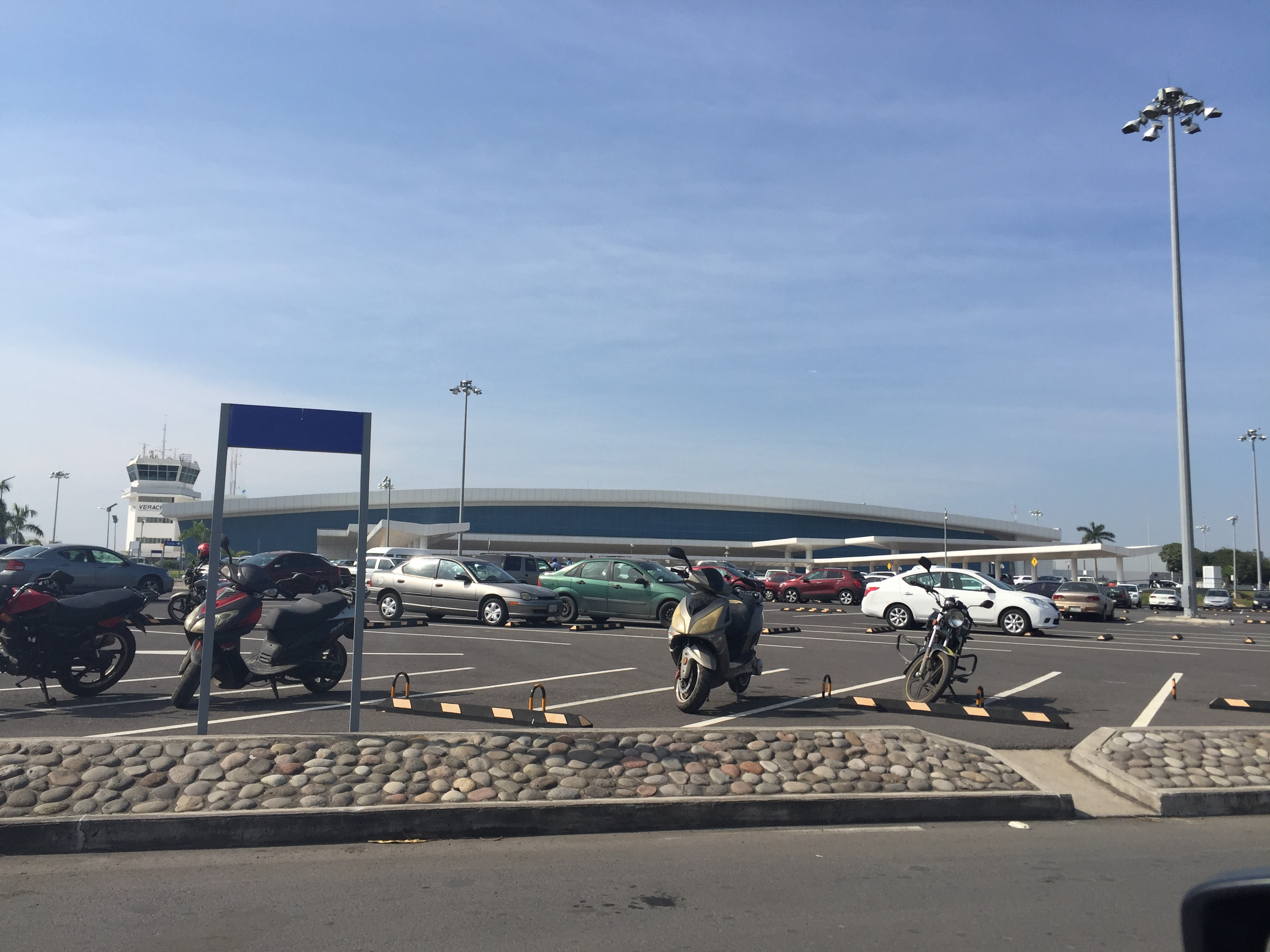
Veracruz airport

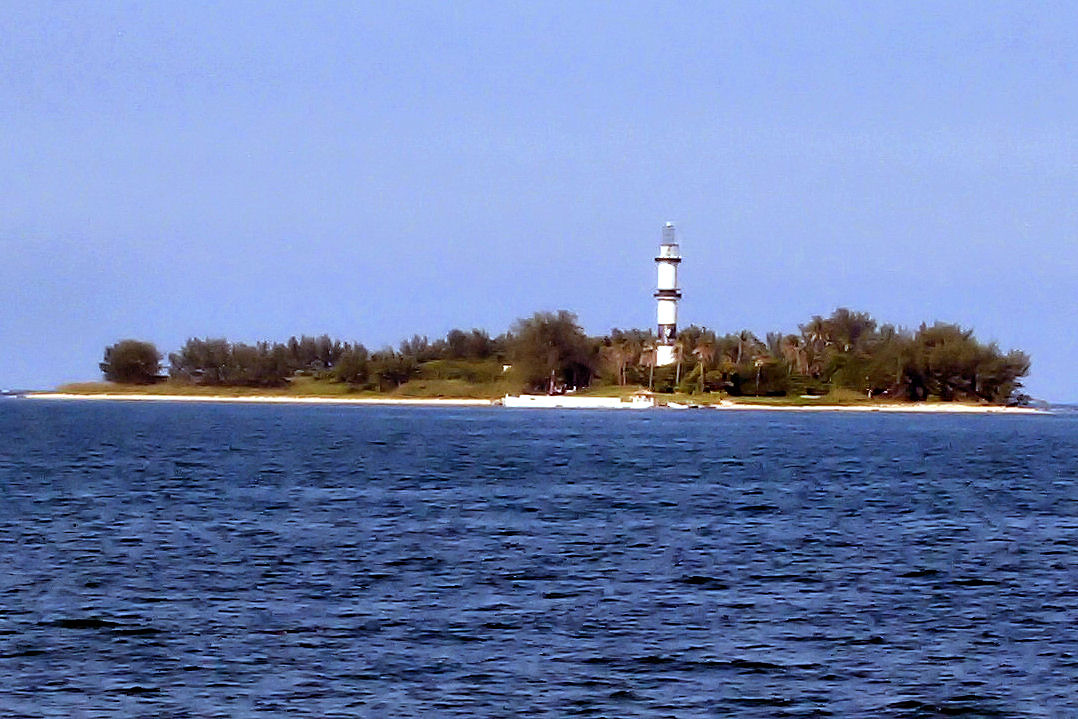
Isla de Sacrificios

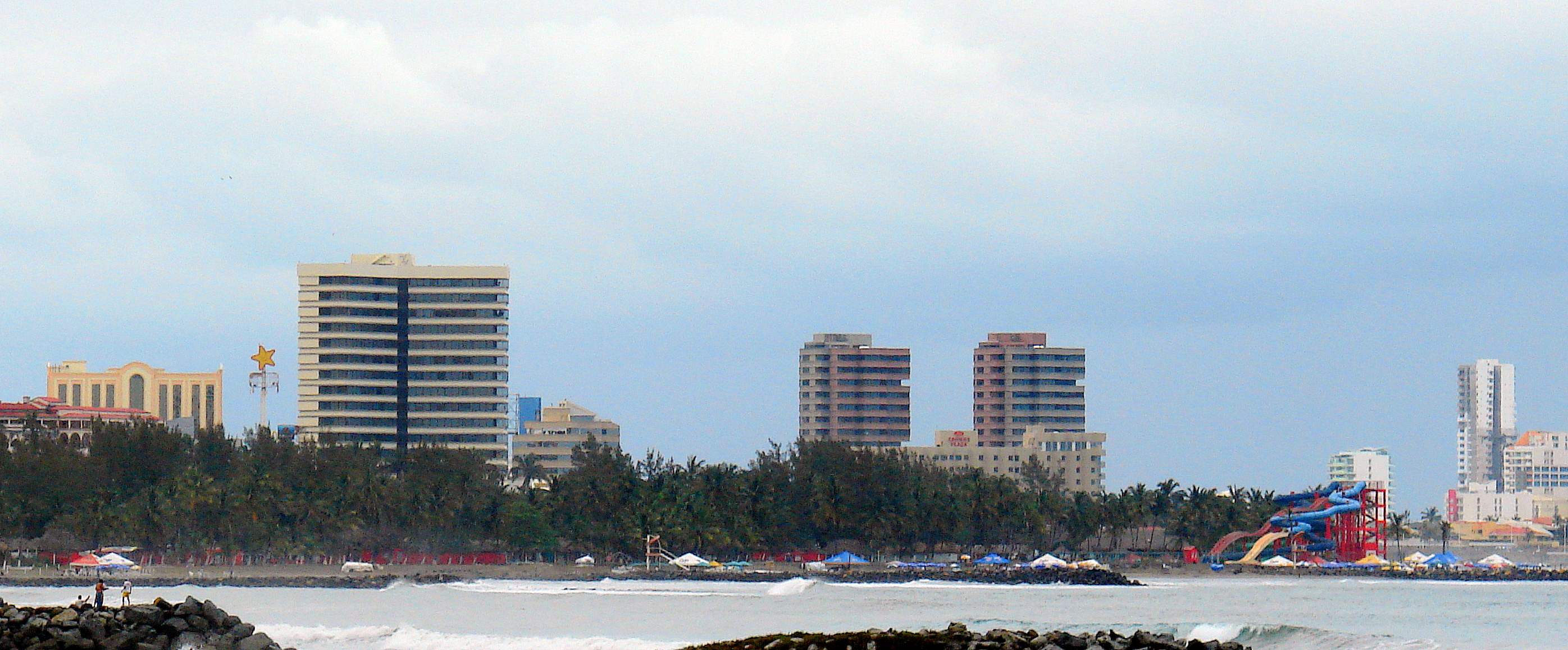
Tourist area of Veracruz

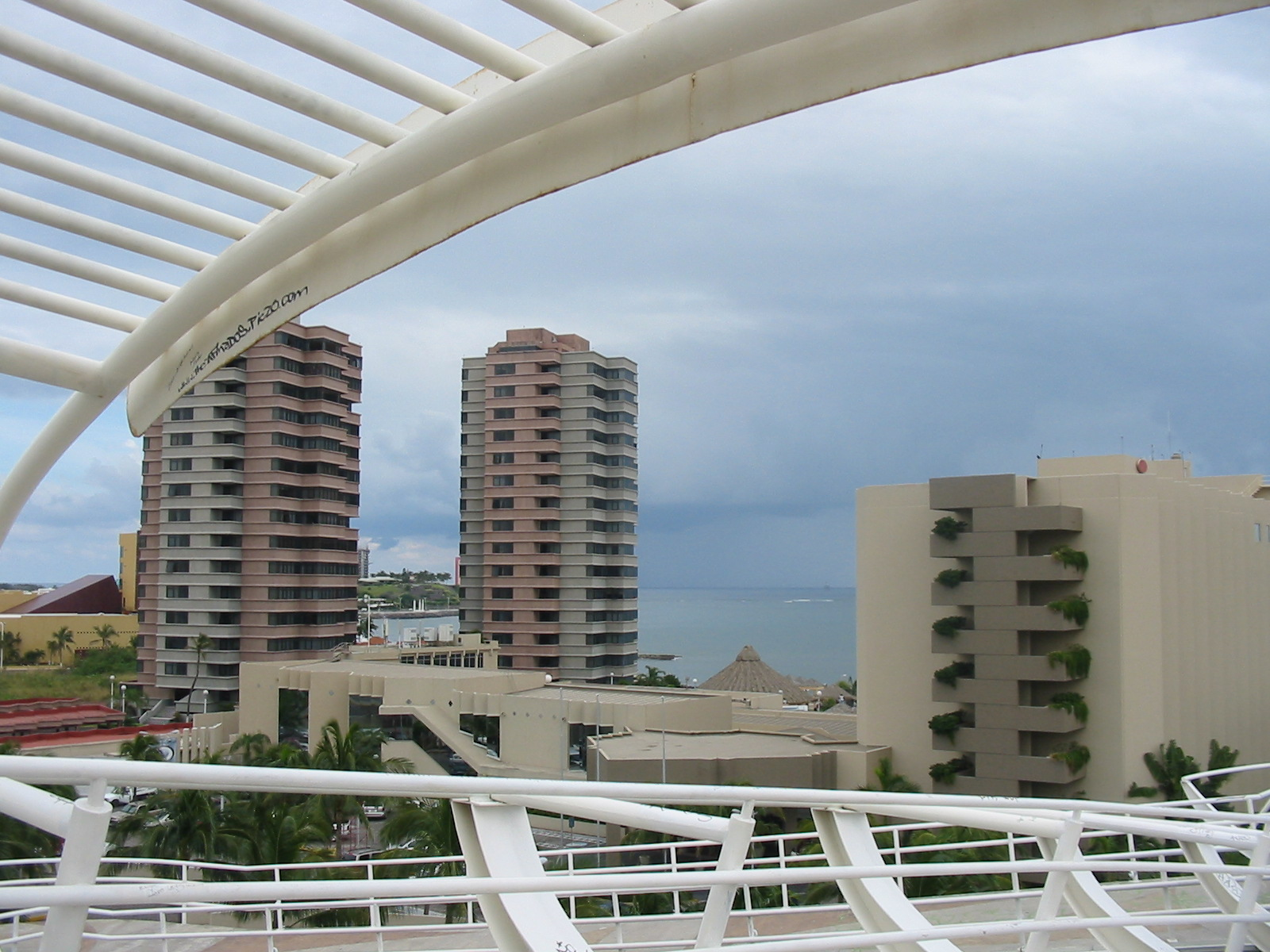
Puente de la Amistad bridge

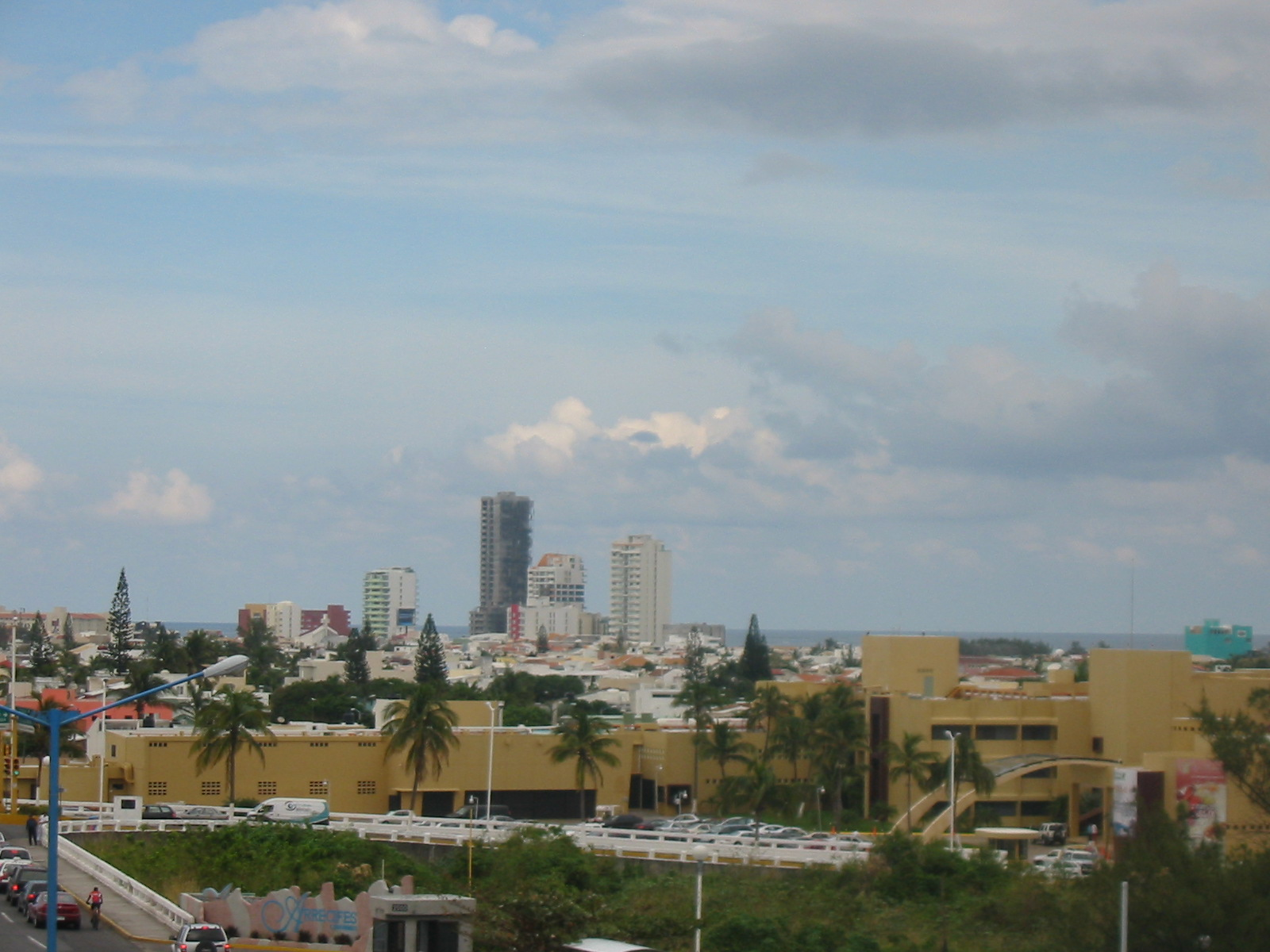
Sunset and sea view in Veracruz

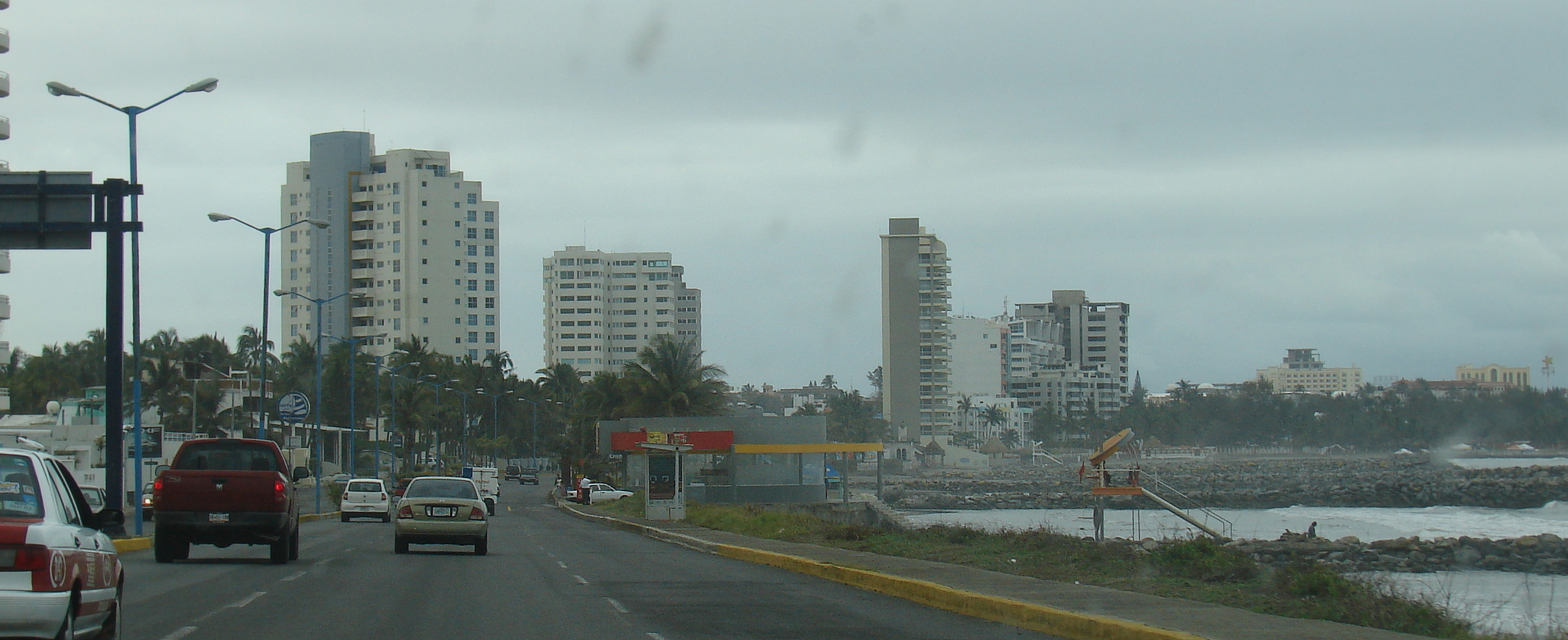
Boulevard Miguel Alemán, Veracruz

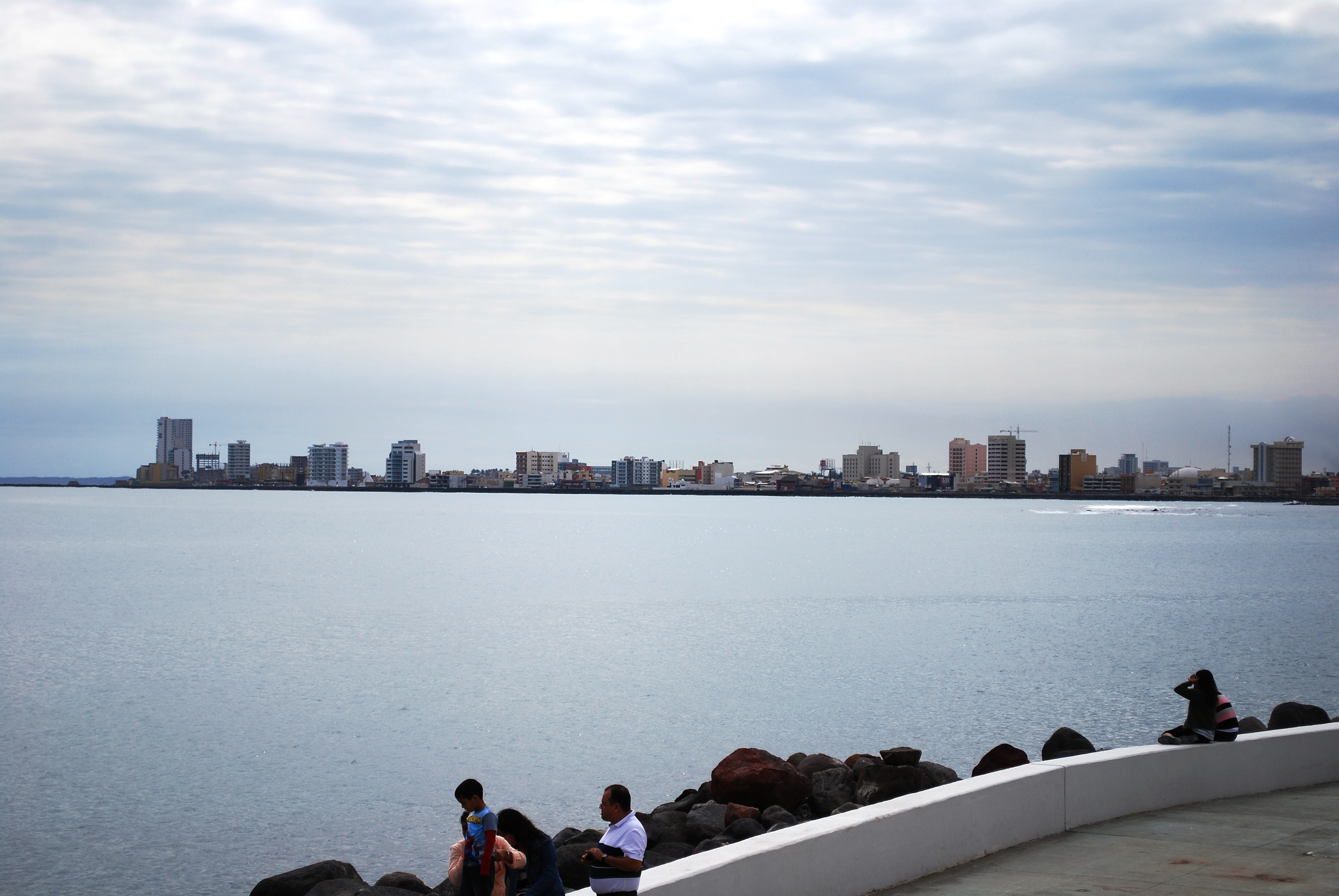
Boulevard Manuel Ávila Camacho, Veracruz

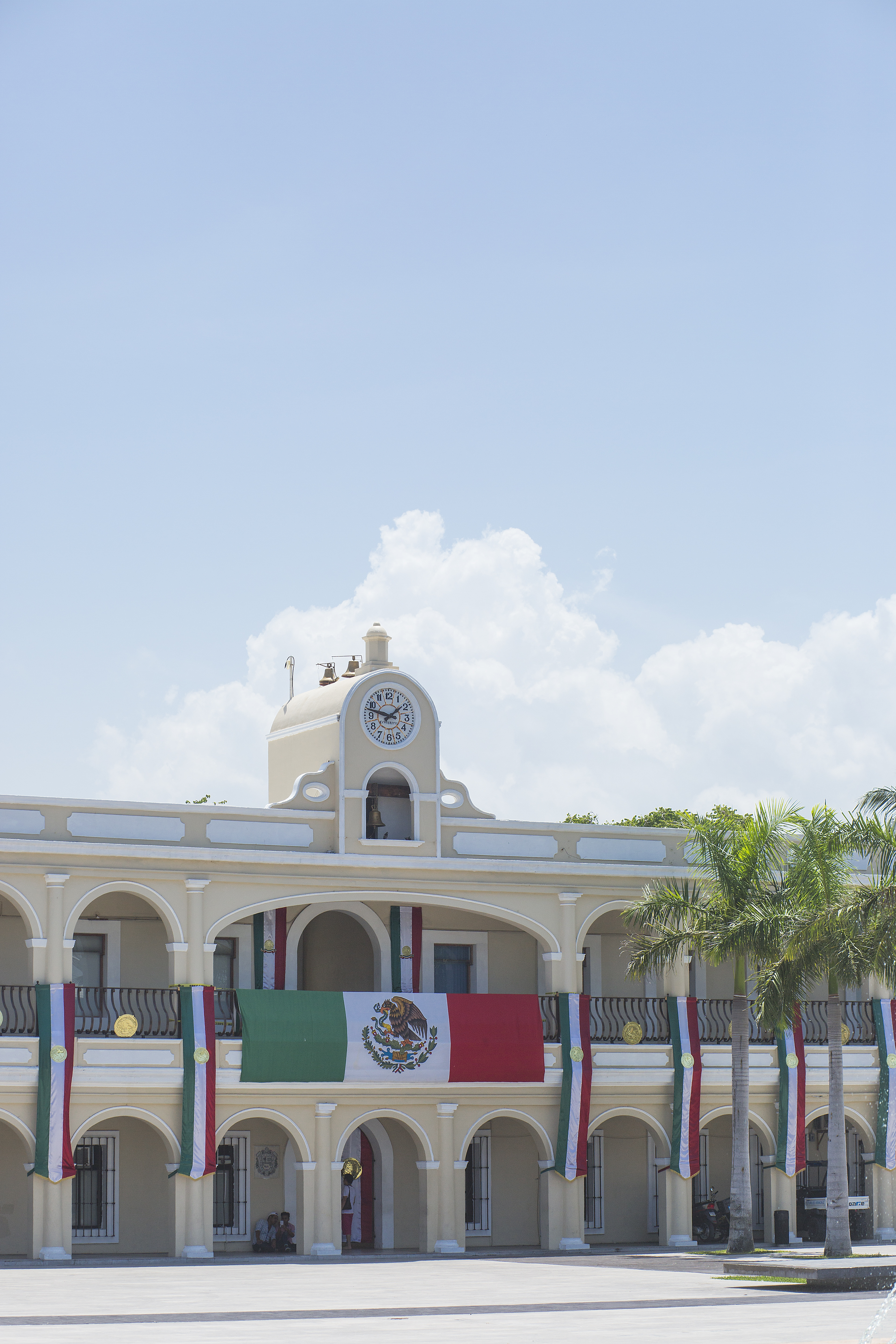
Boca del Río city hall

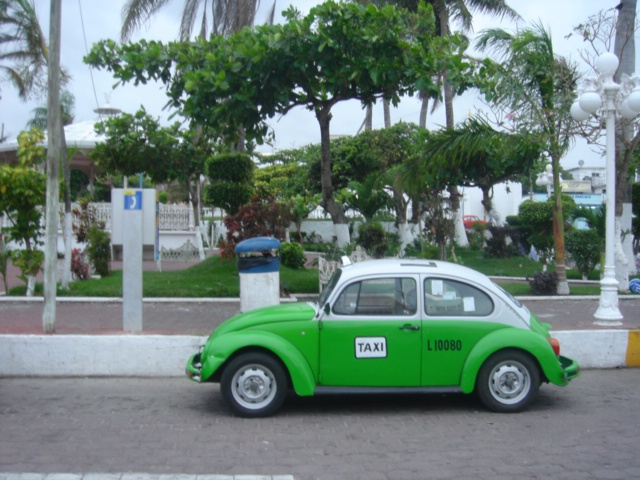
Zócalo, Boca del Río

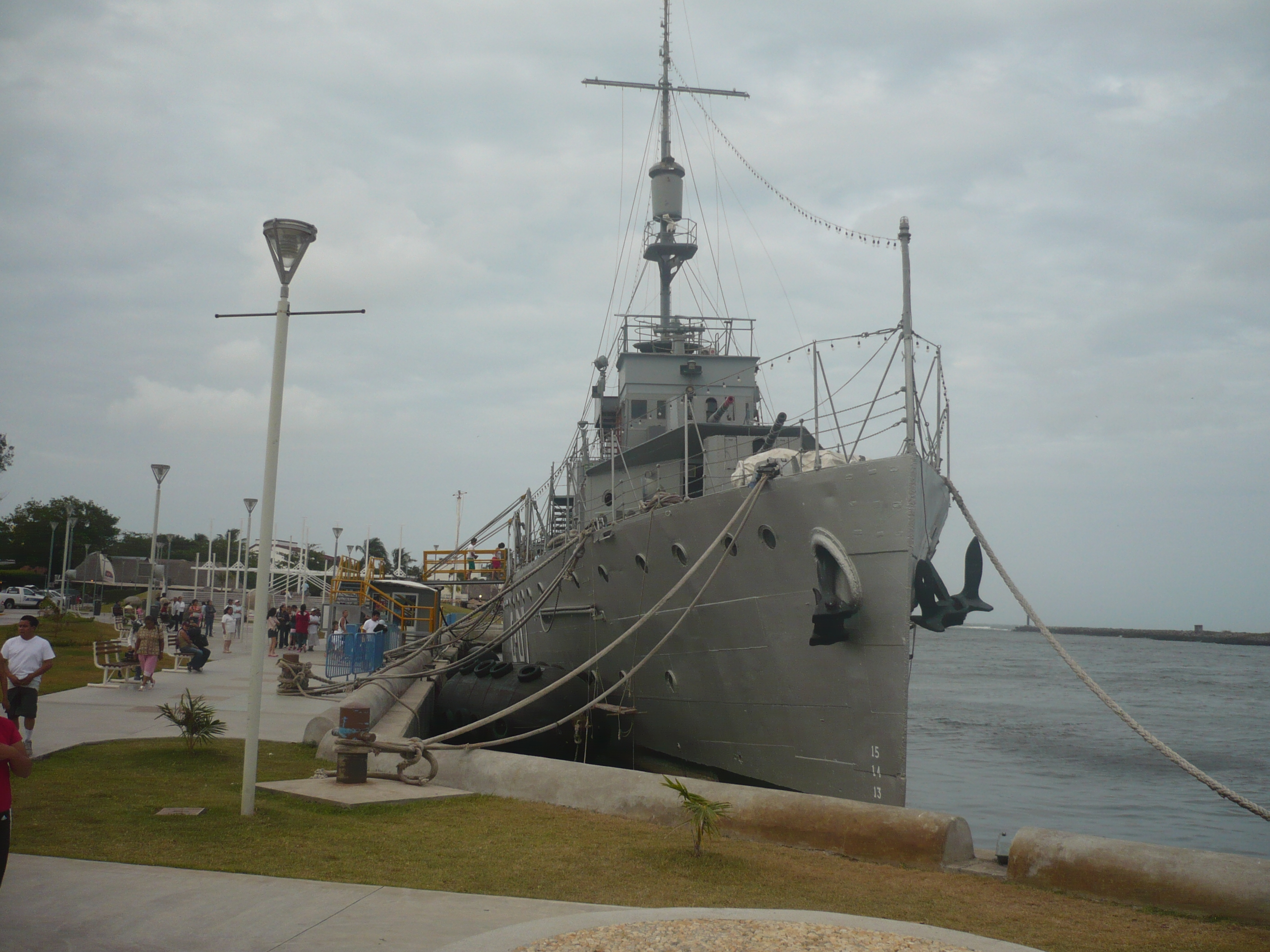
Malecón, Boca del Río

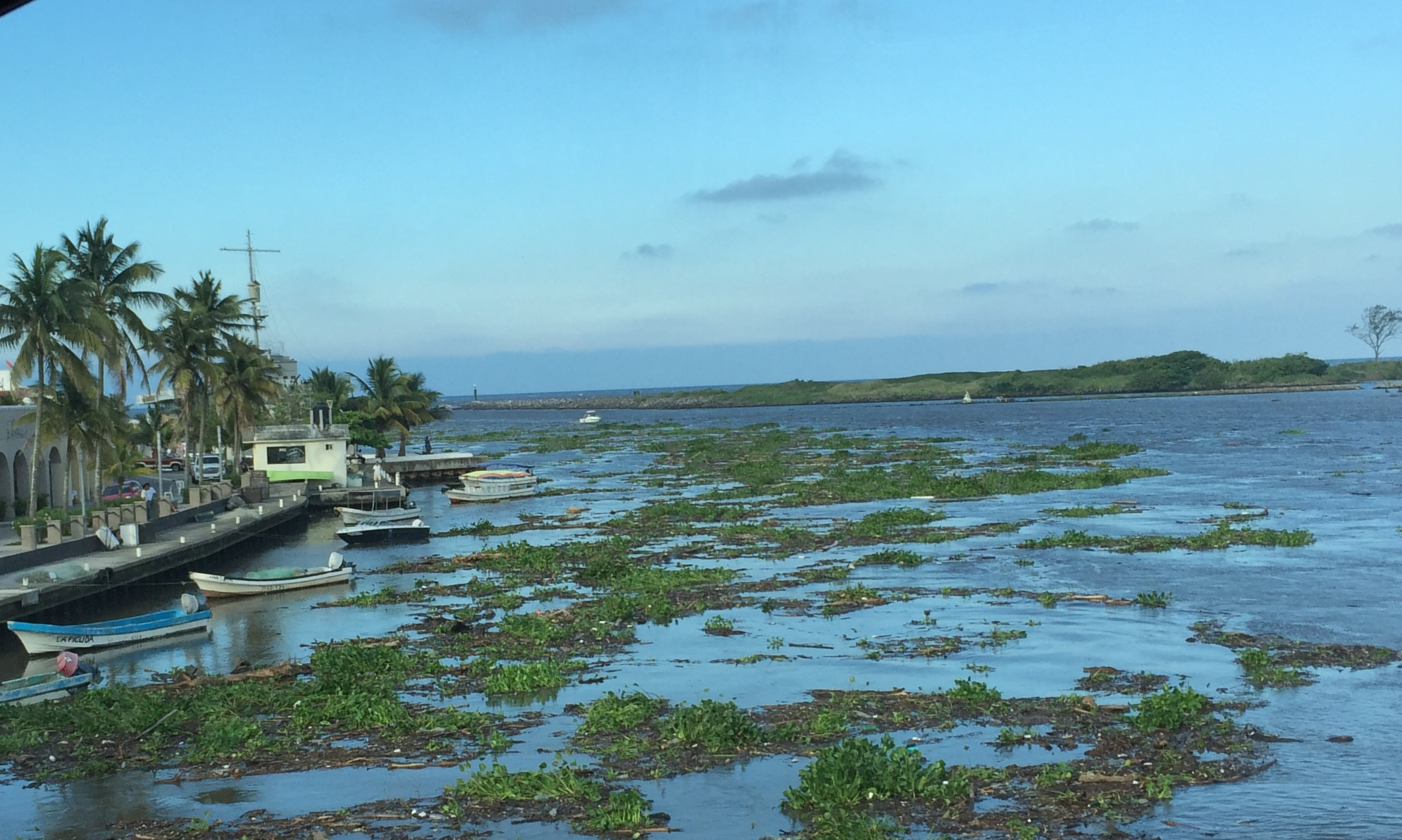
Río Jamapa, Boca del Río

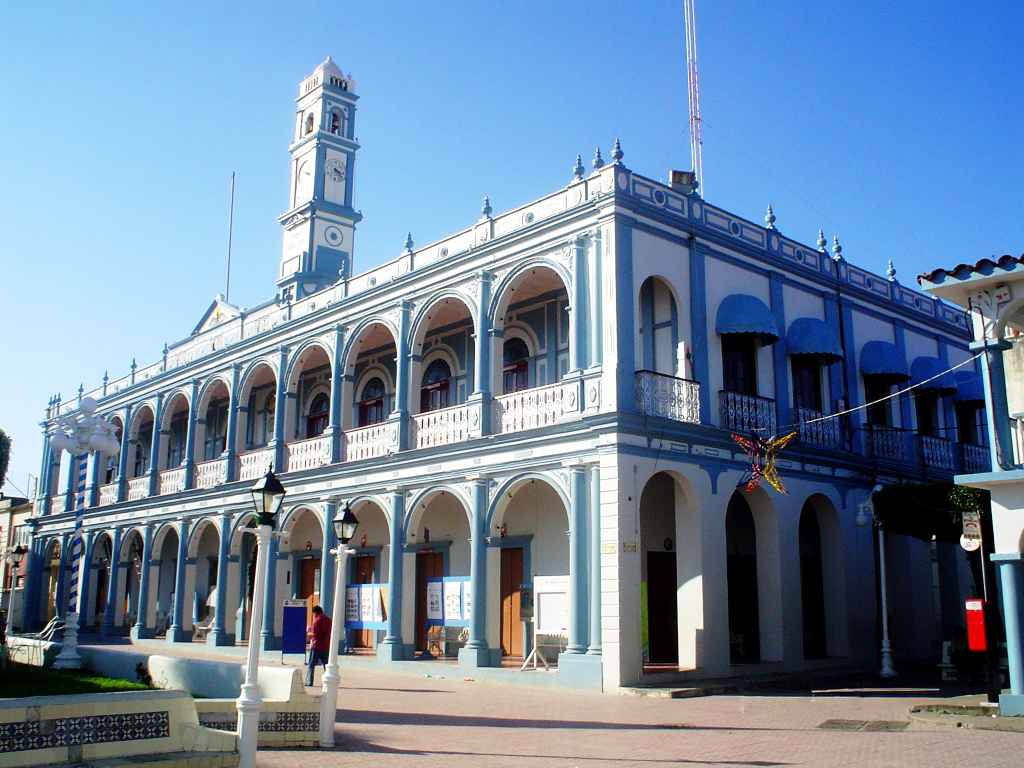
Alvarado city hall

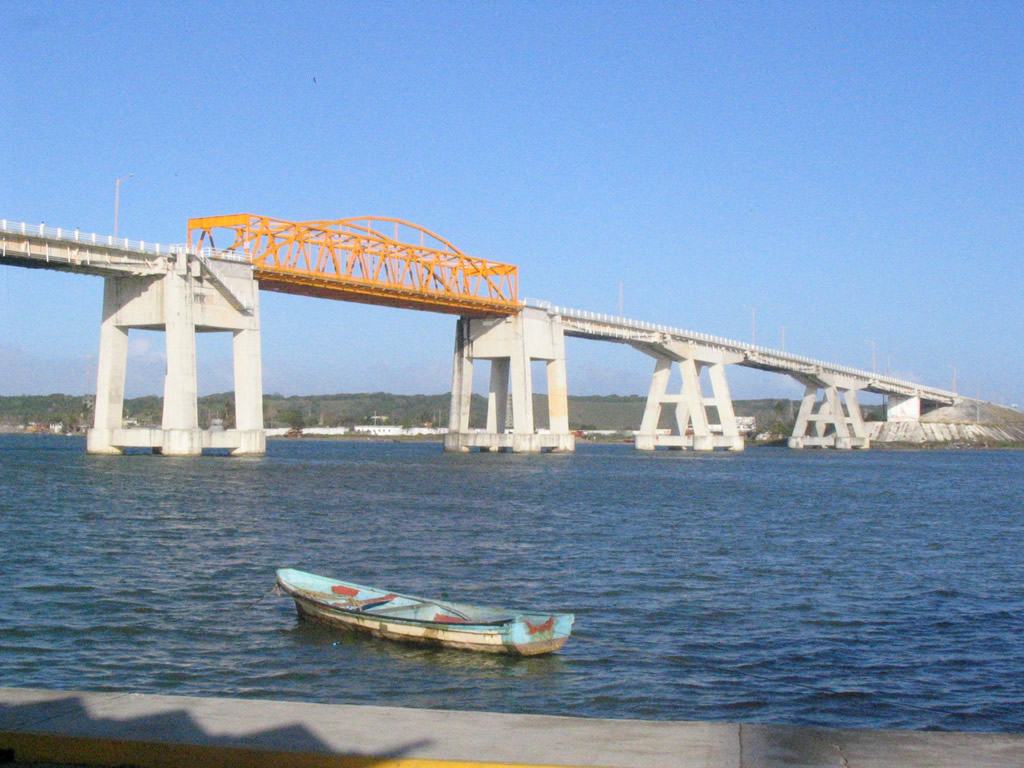
Alvarado bridge

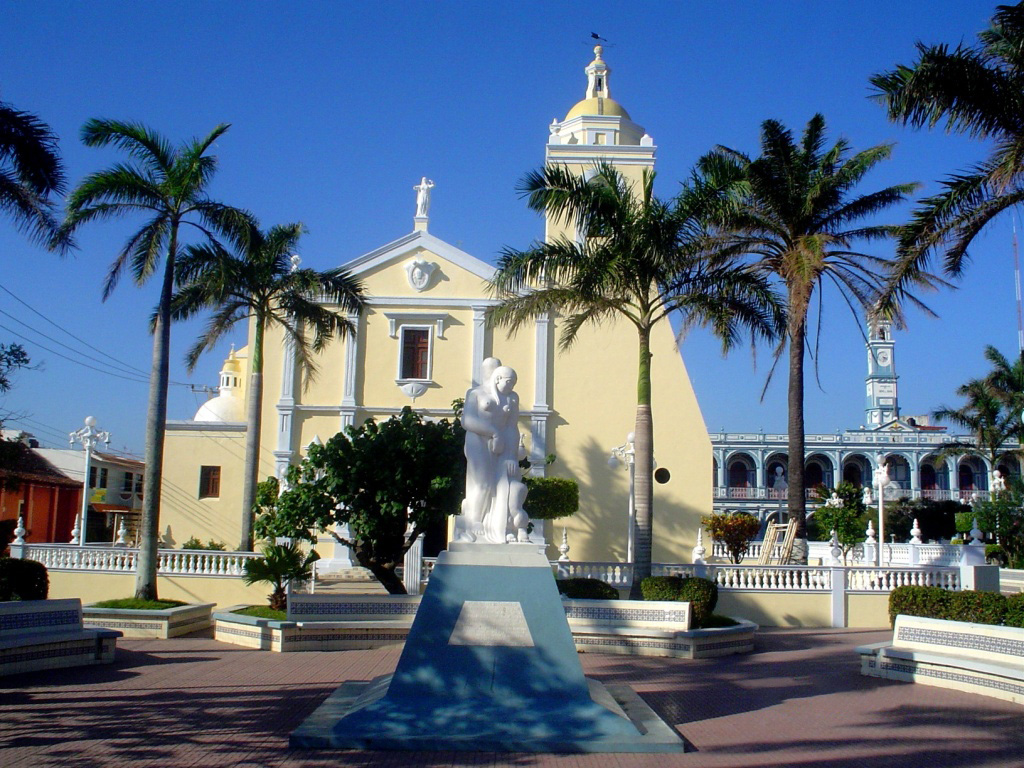
Monumento a los Héroes de Sotavento and Parroquia de Nuestra Señora del Rosario in Alvarado.

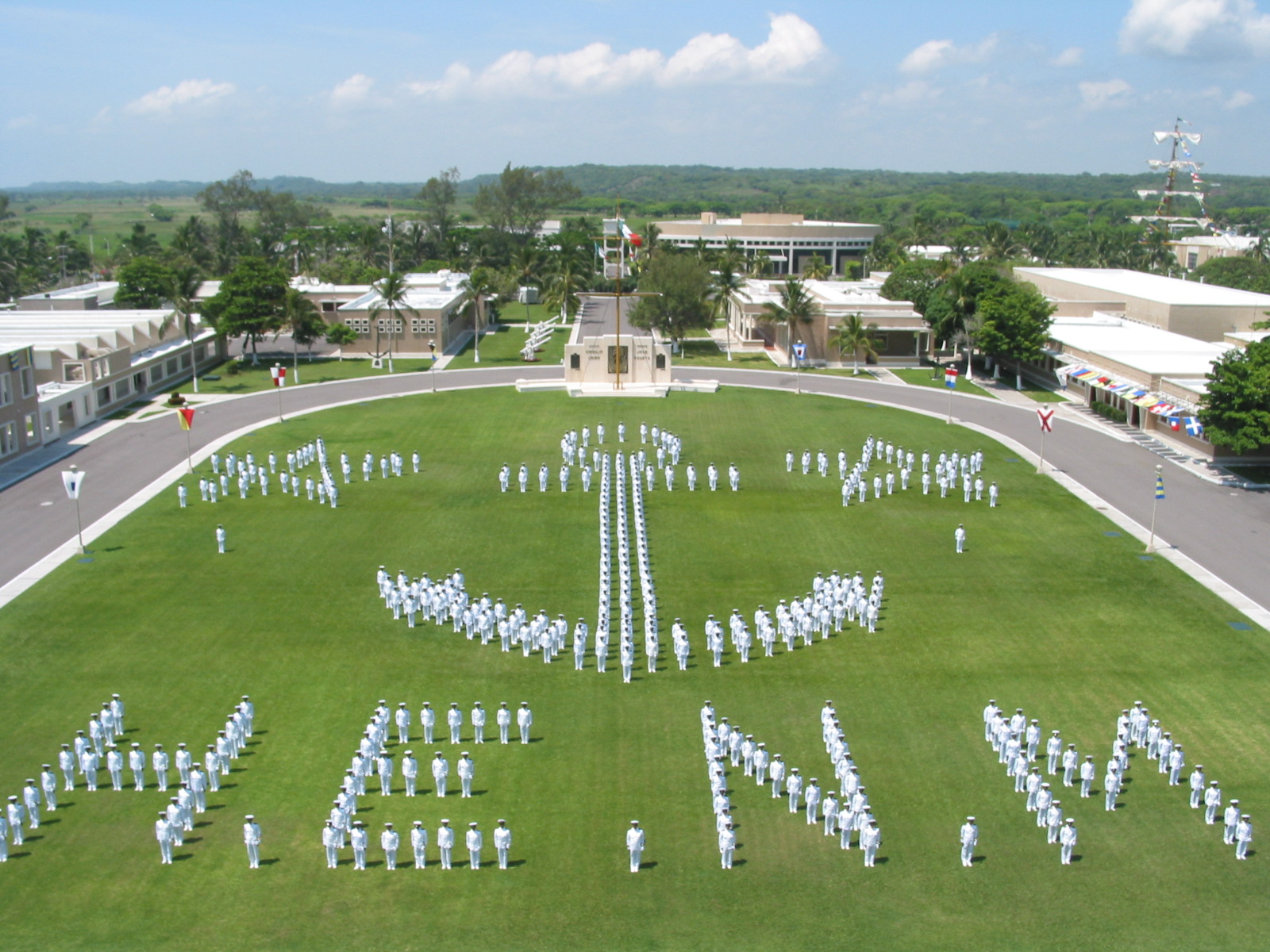
Heroica Escuela Naval Militar in Antón Lizardo

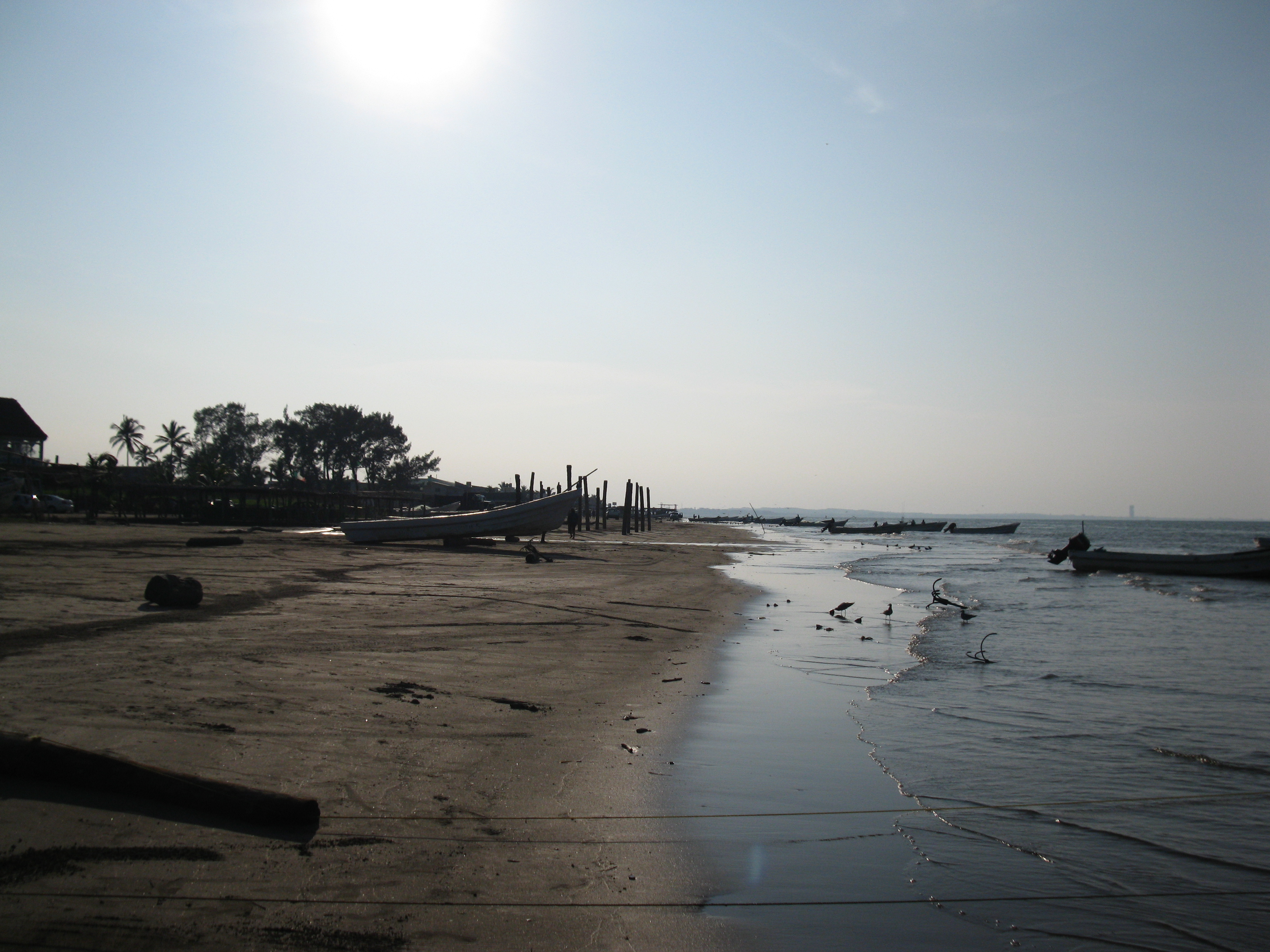
Beach, Antón Lizardo

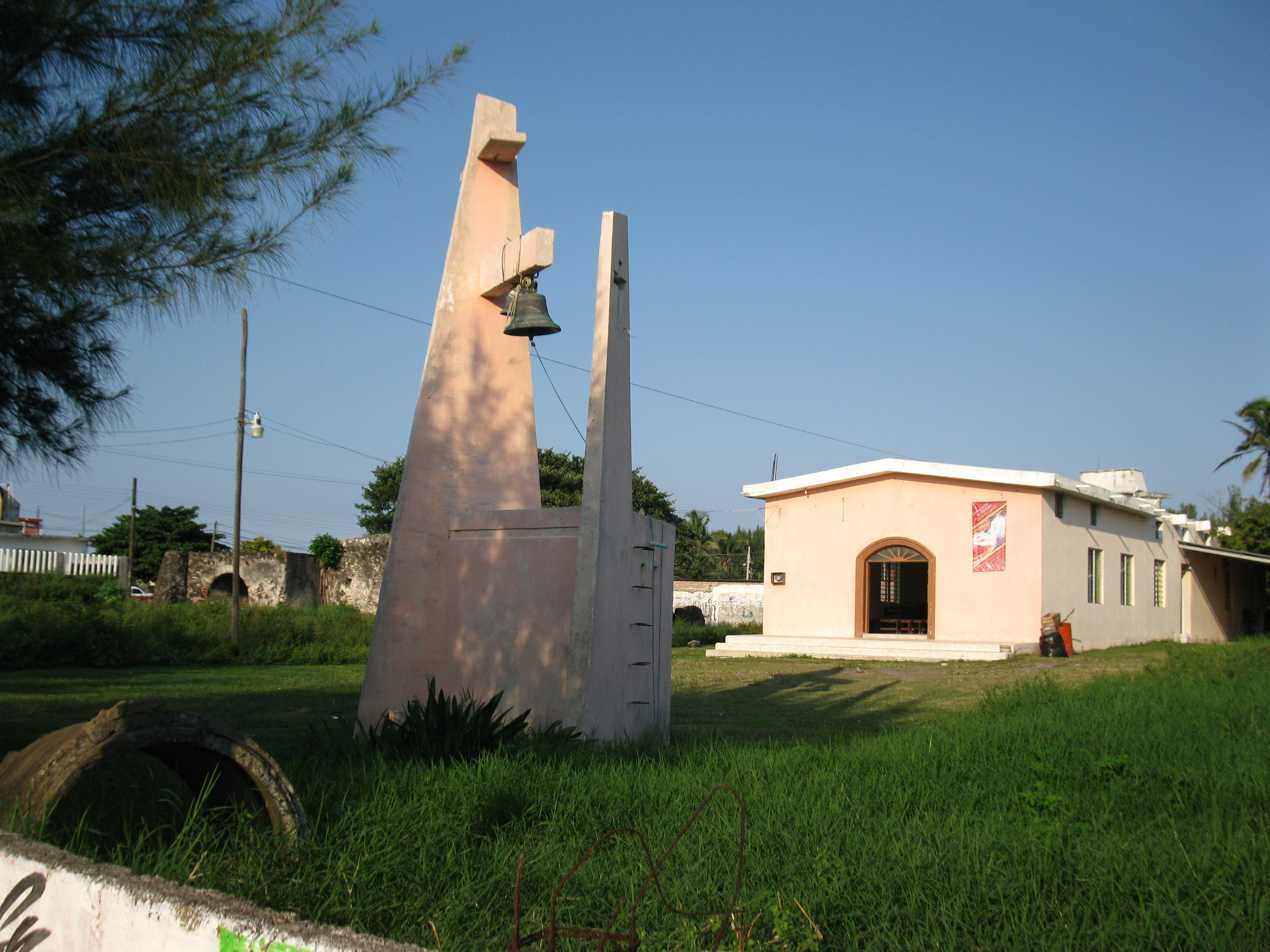
Church, Antón Lizardo

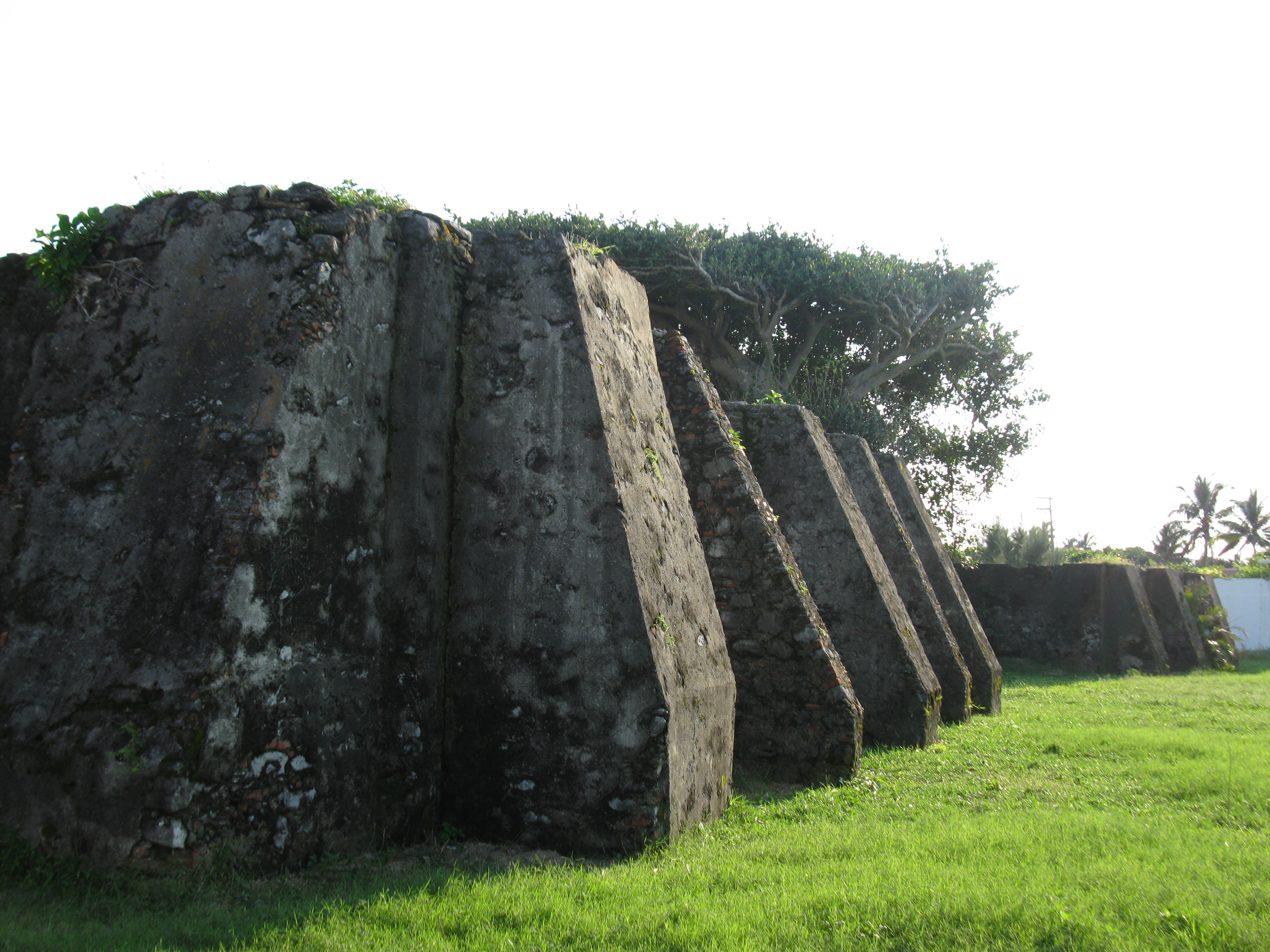
Ruins of Antón Lizardo

== See also ==
- Metropolitan areas of Mexico
