= Medellín Municipality, Veracruz =

Medellín de Bravo

- Coat of arms

- Location in Mexico Medellín de Bravo (Mexico)
- Coordinates: 19°03′42″N 96°09′44″W
- Country: Mexico
- State: Veracruz
- Region: Sotavento Region

Government
  - Mayor: Marcos Isleño Andrade (PVEM)

Area
  - Municipality: 398.2 km^{2} (153.7 sq mi)
- Elevation: 15 m (49 ft)

Population (2020)
  - Municipality: 95,202
  - Density: 239.1/km^{2} (619/sq mi)
  - Seat: 2,820
- Time zone: UTC-6 (Central (US Central))
- Postal code (of seat): 94270
- Climate: Aw
- Website: (in Spanish) Municipal Official Site

Historical population
Year	Pop.	±%
1995	32,828	—
2000	35,171	+7.1%
2005	38,840	+10.4%
2010	59,126	+52.2%
2015	75,346	+27.4%
2020	95,202	+26.4%

Medellín is a municipality in the Mexican state of Veracruz. The municipal seat is the town of Medellín.

== Geography ==
The municipality is located in the central zone of the state, about 100 km from the state capital Xalapa. It has a surface of 398.2 km2. The municipality of Medellín is delimited to the north by Veracruz, to the north-east by Boca del Río, to the east by Alvarado, to the south by Tlalixcoyan and to the west by Jamapa.

The weather in Medellín is warm all year with rains in summer and autumn.

== Demographics ==
As of 2020, Medellín Municipality had a population of 95,202, with over 155 localities. However only 3% lives in the municipal seat (2,820 hab.). The biggest localities as 2020 are Puente Moreno (34,913 hab.), El Tejar (11,144 hab.), Arboledas San Ramón (8,894 hab.), Paso del Toro (5,787 hab.) and Arboledas San Miguel (4,159 hab.).

== Agriculture ==
It produces principally maize, beans, green chile, rice, watermelon, mango and pineapple.

== Culture ==
In Medellín, in September takes place the celebration in honor to San Miguel Arcangel, Patron of the town.
