= La Antigua, Veracruz =

La Antigua
- Municipality
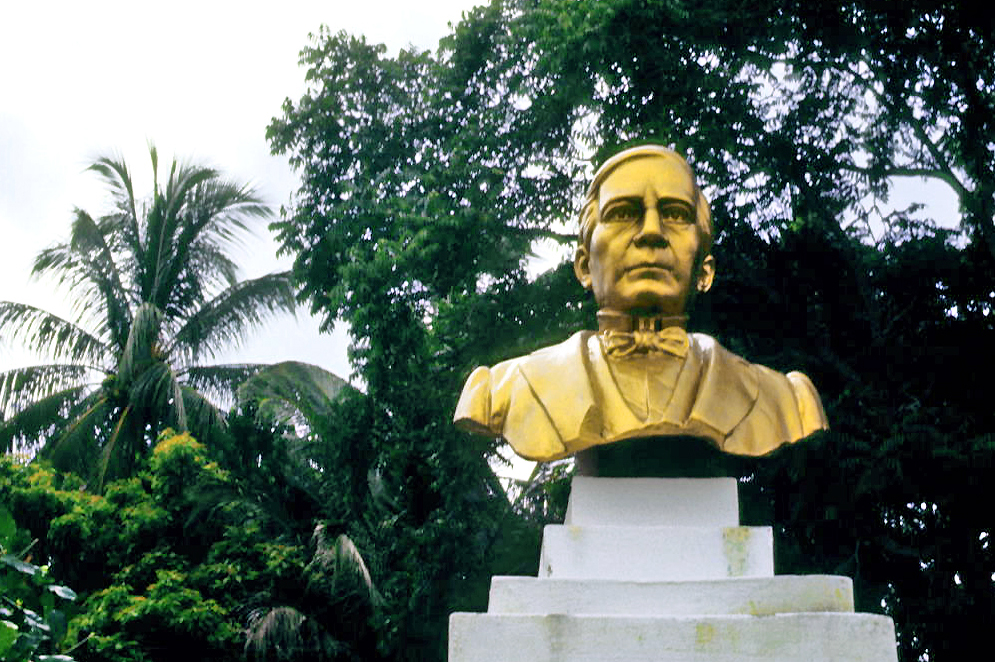
- Statue of Benito Juárez in La Antigua

- Location within Veracruz
- Coordinates: 19°19′3″N 96°22′24″W
- Country: Mexico
- State: Veracruz
- Region: Sotavento Region
- Municipal Seat: José Cardel

Area
  - Total: 131.45 km^{2} (50.75 sq mi)

Population (2015 census)
  - Total: 26,920
  - Density: 204.8/km^{2} (530.4/sq mi)
- Time zone: UTC-6 (Central Standard Time)

La Antigua is a municipality in the Mexican state of Veracruz. The city of José Cardel serves as the municipal seat. La Antigua is regarded as the first real Spanish town in Mexico.

== History ==
In prehispanic times, La Antigua was populated by a totonac settlement called Huitzilapan, which in Nahuatl means "in the river of the hummingbirds."

The town of La Antigua was first known as Vera Cruz Vieja (Old "Vera Cruz"), as it was the settlement for the city of Veracruz from 1525 to 1599, when the settlement moved to the actual place where the port stands. The place was chosen due to its better protection from the north winds and the inhospitable sandy areas of the area of San Juan de Ulúa. The oldest church in the Americas was founded here by Hernán Cortés in the early 16th century.

The majority of the commercial traffic of the Iberian Peninsula and New Spain arrived through La Antigua for approximately 75 years. At the end of the 16th century, when the Spanish returned to the settlement in San Juan de Ulúa, the town entered into decline and was renamed to "La Antigua" to avoid confusion with the new city.

During the War of Independence, Guadalupe Victoria installs an operations center in La Antigua. In 1855, was started the construction of the Ferrocarril Interoceánico, which passed through the municipality of La Antigua and led to the foundation to the city of San Francisco de las Peñas. On January 1, 1913, the municipal seat of La Antigua was changed from the nameshake town to the town of San Francisco de las Peñas, title which was returned to La Antigua 1914, but finally ceded the municipal seat to San Francisco de las Peñas on April 1, 1925, which was renamed shortly to José Cardel. As of today, the city of José Cardel is the municipal seat of La Antigua municipality.

== Geography ==
The municipality is found on the Sotavento Region, surrounded in the north by the Úrsulo Galván municipality and the Gulf of Mexico, in the east by the Gulf of Mexico and the Veracruz municipality, in the south by the Veracruz and Paso de Ovejas municipalities and in the west by the Paso de Ovejas, Puente Nacional and Úrsulo Galván municipalities.

The municipality is crossed by the La Antigua River (also called Huitzilapan), which collects water from the Paso de Ovejas and San Juan Rivers.

=== Climate ===
The municipality presents in its entirety a tropical savanna climate, with an average temperature between 24 and 26 °C and precipitations between 1100 and 1300 mm.

== Demographics ==
As of 2015, the population of La Antigua was of 26,920 inhabitants, of which 12,875 were men and 14,045 were women. The municipality contains 34 populated localities, being the largest José Cardel (the only urban locality on the municipality), Nicolás Blanco, La Antigua, La Pureza and Salmoral.

== Culture ==
=== Notable sites ===
Casa de Hernán Cortes: In the town of La Antigua stands the house of Hernán Cortés, a popular tourist attraction, although it is debated if it really was the house of the conquistador, as some sources indicate the house may have been in reality a customs house. The house was built in 1523 and was constructed with corals, snail slime, oyster, nopal, volcanic stone, brick and stucco; but since a hurricane hit the area in the 19th century is completely covered with roots and vines. The house contained 22 rooms, but at this day only 4 stand.

La Ceiba: At approximately 30 meters from the La Antigua River stands an old tree supported by chains. The tree, called La Ceiba, has branches more than 20 meters long. It is believed that Hernán Cortés moored his boats on the tree when arriving to La Antigua. The course of three hurricanes modified the course of the river to the point that the tree no longer stands by the river.

Ermita del Rosario: Built between 1523 and 1524 by Franciscans, it is the first church in the Americas.

Edificio del Cabildo: One of the oldest Spanish structures in Mexico. Built in 1523, it seated the first ayuntamiento or city council.

=== Festivities ===
There are four main festivities, the majority of which are celebrated in the town of La Antigua.

Carnival: Celebrated in March, masks and costumes

Fiesta de la Santa Cruz: on May 3, several dances accompanied by music are held in the town.

Fiesta de Santa Ana: on June 26, with the towns of Alvarado and Tlacotalpan, processions in honor to the Virgins of the Candelaria and Rosario are made along the La Antigua River.

Fiesta de la Virgen del Rosario: on October 7, a procession with launches is made along the La Antigua River in honor to the Virgin of the Rosario. Pyrotechnics can be heard and some launches head to the temple on the way back to La Antigua.
