= Sotavento Region =

Sotavento Region Región del Sotavento
- Region
- Sotavento Region in the State of Veracruz
- Country: Mexico
- State: Veracruz
- Largest city: Veracruz
- Municipalities: 12: Boca del Río; Cotaxtla; Jamapa; La Antigua; Manlio Fabio Altamirano; Medellín; Paso de Ovejas; Puente Nacional; Soledad de Doblado; Tlalixcoyan; Úrsulo Galván; Veracruz

Area (Note: Although public, some statistical information about Veracruz provided on the INEGI's website may not be conspicuously displayed and additional steps (query the database, download files) may be required to access it.)
  - Total: 3,960.69 km^{2} (1,529.23 sq mi)
  - Rank: 8th
- Lowest elevation (Gulf of Mexico): 0 m (0 ft)

Population (2020)
  - Total: 1,085,751
  - Rank: 4th
  - Density: 274.132/km^{2} (709.998/sq mi)
- Time zone: UTC−6 (CST)
- Largest municipality by area: Tlalixcoyan; 917.90 km^{2} (354.40 sq mi)

Sotavento Region is one of the regions of Veracruz, Mexico.

== Geography ==
Sotavento Region lies on the southern Gulf Coastal Plain. Sotavento means leeward, and the region lies in the rain shadow of the coastal Sierra de Chiconquiaco, which makes it drier than the rest of Veracruz' coastal lowlands to the north and south. The Veracruz dry forests ecoregion covers much of the region.

It is bounded on the northeast by the Gulf of Mexico, on the east and south by Papaloapan Region, on the west by Mountains Region, and on the north by Capital Region.

== Municipalities ==
Municipality code	Name	Population		Land Area			Population density	
Municipality code	Name	2020	Rank	km^{2}	sq mi	Rank	2020	Rank
028	Boca del Río	144,550	2	38.1	14.7	12	3,794/km^{2} (9,826/sq mi)	1
049	Cotaxtla	22,050	11	537.3	207.5	2	41/km^{2} (106/sq mi)	12
090	Jamapa	11,132	12	132.1	51.0	9	84/km^{2} (218/sq mi)	7
016	La Antigua	28,682	7	131.9	50.9	10	217/km^{2} (563/sq mi)	5
100	Manlio Fabio Altamirano	23,918	9	247.1	95.4	8	97/km^{2} (251/sq mi)	6
105	Medellín de Bravo	95,202	3	397.3	153.4	4	240/km^{2} (621/sq mi)	4
126	Paso de Ovejas	33,442	5	388.1	149.8	5	86/km^{2} (223/sq mi)	8
134	Puente Nacional	23,544	10	384.1	148.3	6	61/km^{2} (61/km^{2})	10
148	Soledad de Doblado	28,130	8	416.1	160.7	3	68/km^{2} (175/sq mi)	9
181	Tlalixcoyan	37,795	4	917.9	354.4	1	41/km^{2} (107/sq mi)	11
191	Úrsulo Galván	30,097	6	124.6	48.1	11	242/km^{2} (626/sq mi)	3
193	Veracruz	607,209	1	249.3	96.3	7	2,436/km^{2} (6,308/sq mi)	2
	Sotavento Region	1,085,751	—	3,166	1,530.51	—	274/km^{2} (709/sq mi)	—
Source: INEGI

=== Largest cities ===
Largest cities or towns in Sotavento Region Source:
Rank		Municipality	Pop.
1	Veracruz	Veracruz	405,952
2	Veracruz	Boca del Río	132,011
3	Valente Díaz	Veracruz	36,818
4	Fraccionamiento Puente Moreno	Medellín de Bravo	34,913
5	Lomas de Río Medio Cuatro	Veracruz	20,849
6	José Cardel	La Antigua	20,182
7	Fraccionamiento Geovillas Los Pinos	Veracruz	16,855
8	Las Amapolas	Veracruz	15,076
9	Soledad de Doblado	Soledad de Doblado	13,716
10	Hacienda Sotavento	Veracruz	11,583
