= Jamapa =

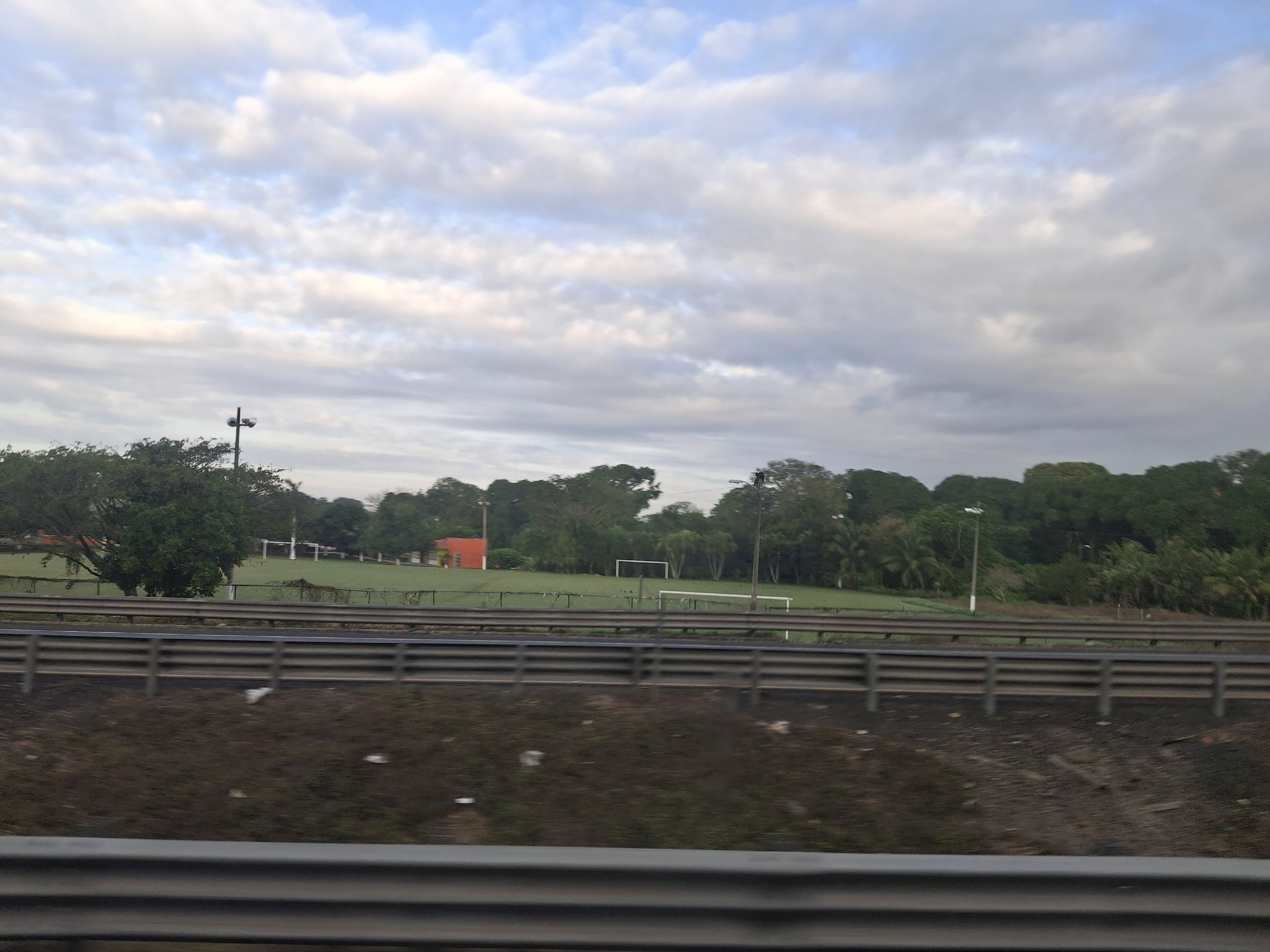
- Outside the city of Jamapa, from the Córdoba–Veracruz highway

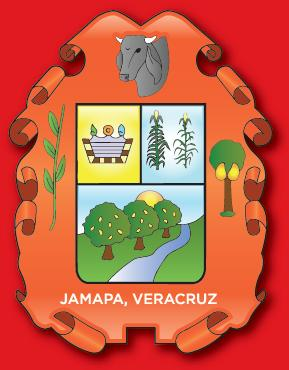
- Coat of arms

- Location in Mexico Jamapa (Mexico)
- Coordinates: 19°02′28″N 96°14′28″W
- Country: Mexico
- State: Veracruz
- Region: Sotavento Region

Government
  - Mayor: Victor Enedino Morales Castro (PRI)

Area
  - Municipality and City: 132.4 km^{2} (51.1 sq mi)
- Elevation: 18 m (59 ft)

Population (2020)
  - Municipality and City: 11,132
  - Seat: 4,677
- Time zone: UTC-6 (Central (US Central))
- Postal code (of seat): 94260
- Climate: Aw
- Website: (in Spanish) Municipal Official Site

Historical population
| Year | Pop. | ±% |
|---|---|---|
| 1995 | 9,135 | — |
| 2000 | 9,969 | +9.1% |
| 2005 | 9,772 | −2.0% |
| 2010 | 10,376 | +6.2% |
| 2015 | 10,361 | −0.1% |
| 2020 | 11,132 | +7.4% |

Jamapa is a municipality in the Mexican state of Veracruz which stands on Federal Highway 137. Its name comes from Nahuatl Xam-a-pan, meaning 'in the river of the adobes'. The municipality was established on 17 February 1870.

It had a population 11,132 in 2020. Jamapa borders Manlio Fabio Altamirano to the north and west, Medellín to the north, south and east, Cotaxtla to the west and south.

Jamapa is very agricultural as a region; major products are corn, coffee, fruits, and sugar.

On 10 November 2020, municipal president Florisel Ríos Delfín (a PRD member) was kidnapped and assassinated. Her body was found in Medellín de Bravo the next day.
