= Alvarado, Veracruz =

Alvarado Ilustre, Heroica y Generosa Ciudad y Puerto de Alvarado
- City
- Illustrious, Heroic, and Generous City and Port of Alvarado
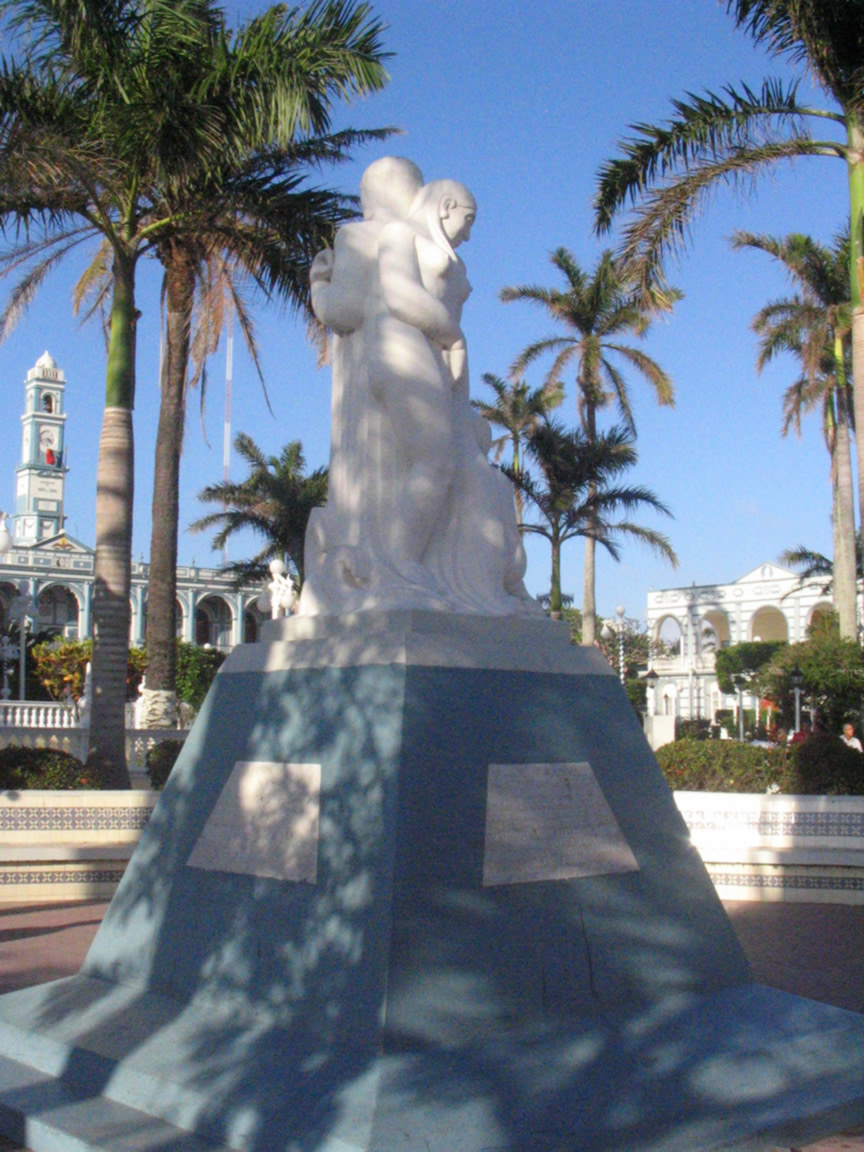
- Statue at the Municipal Plaza

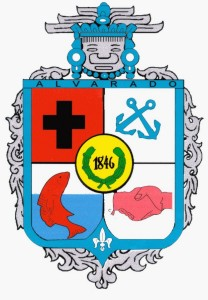
- Coat of arms
- Nickname: La Perla del Sotavento (The leeward's pearl)
- Motto: Ilustre, Heroica y Generosa (Illustrious, Heroic and Generous)
- Location within Mexico
- Coordinates: 18°46′52″N 95°45′26″W
- Country: Mexico
- State: Veracruz
- Region: Papaloapan
- Municipality: Alvarado
- Founded: 1518 (as San Cristóbal de Alvarado)
- Town status: 1816
- City status: 1878
- Founder: Pedro de Alvarado
- Boroughs: 21: 21 de Abril; Alvarado Centro; El Pescador; Escolleras; Infonavit; La Fuente; La Trocha; Las Aneas; Loma del Chile; Lomas del Rosario; Los Aguacates; Los Carriles; Los Framboyanes; Luz del Carmen; Magisterial; Marigalante; Pantanal; Paso Nacional; Valente Cruz; Villas Alvarado; Vista Hermosa

Government
  - Type: Municipal Council
  - Mayor: Lizette Álvarez Vera (Morena, Green Party, Labor Party)

Area
  - Total: 840.63 km^{2} (324.57 sq mi)
- Elevation: 10 m (33 ft)

Population (2020)
  - Total: 57,035
- Demonyms: Alvaradian; Spanish: Alvaradeño, -ña (formal); Jarocho, -cha (colloquial)
- Time zone: UTC-6 (CST)
- Postal code: 95250, 95270, 95272, 95274 to 95278
- Area code: 297
- HDI (2002): 0.77987 (medium)
- Climate: Aw
- Website: Official website

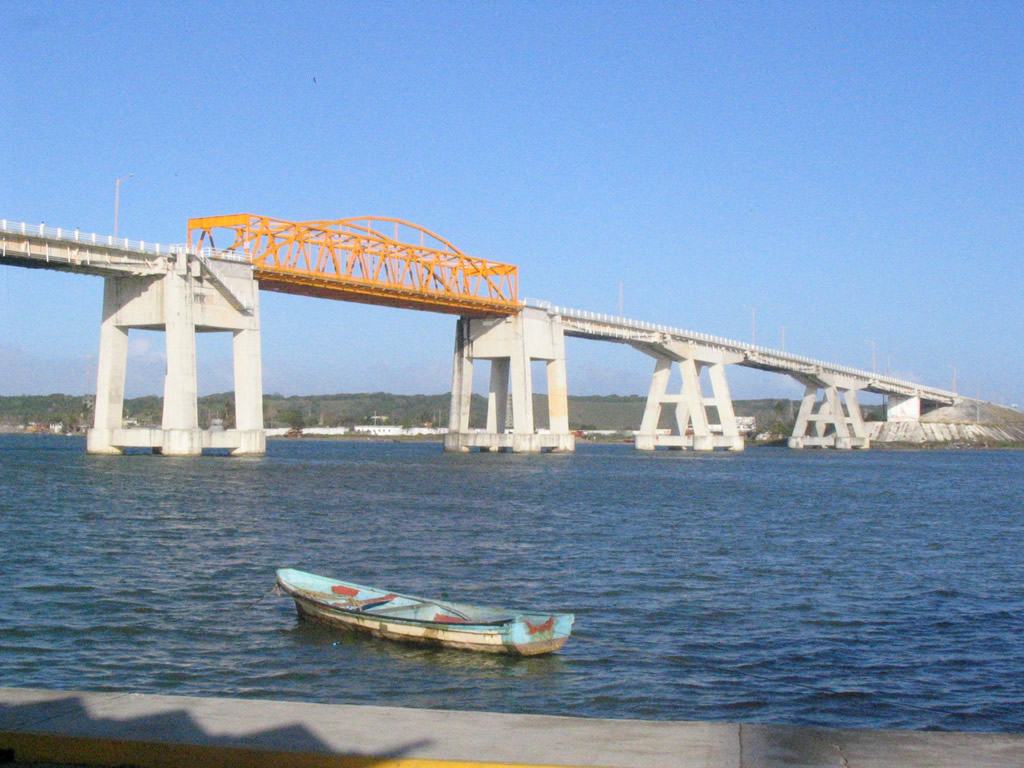
The Alvarado Bridge over the Papaloapan river

Alvarado (officially: Ilustre, Heroica y Generosa Ciudad y Puerto de Alvarado) is a city in the Mexican state of Veracruz. The city also serves as the municipal seat for the surrounding municipality of the same name. It is located 64 km (40 mi) from the city of Veracruz, Veracruz, on Federal Highways 180 and 125. Alvarado is bordered by Boca del Río, Tlalixcoyan, Medellín, Ignacio de la Llave, Ciudad Lerdo de Tejada, Tlacotalpan and Acula. It is 10 m (33 ft) above sea level. It lies in the so-called "Region Papaloapan" bordered on the south by the municipalities of Acula, Tlacotalpan and Lerdo de Tejada, on the east by the Gulf of Mexico and on the west by Ignacio de la Llave.

The geographic size of Alvarado is 840 square kilometres (320 sq mi).

The INEGI said that the population by 2000 was 22,608 people.

== History ==
Alvarado was founded in the 16th century. In 1518, Pedro de Alvarado arrived to Atlizintla. In 1563, Juan de Sahagún built a port in the area to supply the Port of Veracuz. The locality started being known as San Cristóbal de Alvarado from 1600 onwards.

== Economy ==
Major products of Alvarado are coffee, fruits, and sugar. The economy of this region is based on fishing and farming. Sugar cane and coffee are common products of this region.
