= Tlalixcoyan =

Municipality of Mexico

Coordinates: 18°48′11″N 96°03′40″W

- Municipality
- Location in Mexico Tlalixcoyan (Mexico)
- Country: Mexico
- State: Veracruz
- Demonym: (in Spanish)
- Time zone: UTC−6 (CST)

Tlalixcoyan (pronounced Tlah-leeks-KOH-yan) is a municipality in the Mexican state of Veracruz. In Tlalixcoyan the main indigenous language is the Chinantec.

== Geography ==
Tlalixcoyan is bordered by: Alvarado, Medellín, and Cotaxtla and is on Mexican Federal Highways 180 and 190.

== Notable people ==
Lorenzo Barcelata, composer, was born in Tlalixcoyan, Veracruz, and he died in Mexico City from cholera.
