= José Cardel, Veracruz =

José Cardel
- City
- Location in Mexico
- Coordinates: 19°22′0″N 96°22′0″W
- Country: Mexico
- State: Veracruz
- Municipality: La Antigua
- Elevation: 19.8 m (65 ft)

Population (2020 census)
  - Total: 20,165
- Time zone: UTC-6 (Central Standard Time)
- Postal Code: 91680
- Area code: 296

José Cardel is a city in the Mexican state of Veracruz. It serves as the municipal seat for the surrounding municipality of La Antigua. It's located 30 km north of the city of Veracruz.
