= Cotaxtla =

- Municipality and town
- Location in Mexico Cotaxtla (Mexico)
- Coordinates: 18°50′N 96°23′W
- Country: Mexico
- State: Veracruz
- Region: Sotavento Region

Government
  - Mayor: José Santurino Beltrán Vásquez (PAN)

Area
  - Total: 537.8 km^{2} (207.6 sq mi)
- Elevation: 18 m (59 ft)

Population (2020)
  - Total: 22,050
  - Density: 41/km^{2} (110/sq mi)
  - Seat: 1,316
- Time zone: UTC-6 (Central (US Central))
- Postal code (of seat): 94990
- Climate: Aw
- Website: (in Spanish) Municipal Official Site

Historical population
Year	Pop.	±%
1995	18,179	—
2000	18,920	+4.1%
2005	18,821	−0.5%
2010	19,710	+4.7%
2015	21,013	+6.6%
2020	22,050	+4.9%

Cotaxtla is a town and municipality in the Mexican state of Veracruz. It is located 45 km from the city of Veracruz on Federal Highway 180.

== Demographics ==
As of 2020, the municipality had a population of 22,050 inhabitants in 209 localities. Cotaxtla, the municipal seat had a population of 1,316 inhabitants as 2020; other localities includes La Tinaja (1,918 hab.), La Capilla (1,496 hab.), Colonia Ejidal (1,160 hab.) and Mata Tejón (612).

== Economy ==
Major products in Cotaxtla are corn, sugar, and fruits.

== History ==
Cotaxtla, originally known in Nahuatl as Cuetlaxtlan, was a prehispanic settlement. Nahuatl was apparently the main language, though some of the people in this region may have been called Pinome, meaning non-Nahuatl speakers. The local economy was based upon agricultural staples and riverine and marine resources, and birds (such as parrots), fruits (such as cherries), and game (such as deer) were also local products.

Cuetlaxtlan was a front of proxy conflict between the Aztec Empire and Tlaxcala. It was conquered by Nezahualcoyotl and/or Moctezuma I and the Tlaxcaltecas were unable to defend it. It was then incorporated into the Aztec Empire as a tributary province and was obliged to offer mantas, cacao, tropical feathers and amber. A Mexica governor/tribute collector, bestowed with the title Pinotecuhtli (lord of the Pinome), was installed here and expanded the tribute to include gems, animal skins, sea shells, fish, and shellfish.

Nonetheless, Cuetlaxtlan remained a restless area, which was encouraged by Tlaxcala as a way to undermine Aztec power. It did eventually rebel, which forced Axayacatl to reconquer the area. He then proceeded to replace the local rulers and install a new Mexica governor. From this point on the tribute consisted of large amounts of mantas, warrior costumes, precious stones, tropical feathers, a royal badge of quetzal feathers, lip plugs of crystal and amber, and cacao. The Aztecs built fortifications and a garrison here. At the time of the Spanish conquest, the calpixqui (tribute collector) was named Teniltzin.

In September 2010, the city suffered widespread damage from Hurricane Karl which inundated the area with floods up to 12 m (39 ft) deep.
