= Medellín, Veracruz =

Town in Veracruz, Mexico

- City and municipal seat
- Coat of arms

- Location in Mexico Medellín, Veracruz (Mexico)
- Coordinates: 19°03′42″N 96°09′44″W
- Country: Mexico
- State: Veracruz
- Region: Sotavento Region
- Municipality: Medellín
- Elevation: 10 m (33 ft)

Population (2020)
  - Total: 95,202

Medellín de Bravo, formerly known as Tecamachales, is a town in the Mexican state of Veracruz, and the capital of the municipality of Medellín. It is part of the Metropolitan Area of Veracruz.

== History ==
In pre-Columbian America the place was called Tecamachales. After the battle of La Noche Triste in 1520, Hernán Cortés ordered Gonzalo de Sandoval to found Medellín. In the year 1529, Don Juan de Zumárraga, bishop of Mexico, arrived in the town for the inauguration of the local church, considered the second in New Spain, which received the name of San Miguel Arcángel.

== Festivals ==
In September, celebrations takes place in honour of the Archangel Michael, the patron of the town.
