= Manlio Fabio Altamirano, Veracruz =

Manlio Fabio Altamirano
- City and municipality
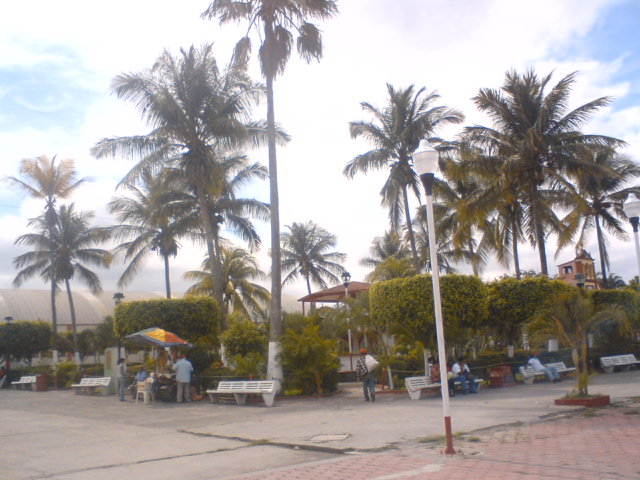
- Manlio Fabio Altamirano main plaza

- Location within Veracruz Location within Mexico
- Coordinates: 19°06′01″N 96°20′28″W
- Country: Mexico
- State: Veracruz
- Region: Sotavento Region

Government
  - Mayor: Ana Lilia Arrieta Gutiérrez (MORENA)

Area
  - Total: 246.8 km^{2} (95.3 sq mi)

Population
  - Total: 23,918
  - Density: 96.9/km^{2} (251/sq mi)
  - Seat: 6,084
- Time zone: UTC-6 (CST)
- Website: Official Website

Historical population
Year	Pop.	±%
1995	20,562	—
2000	20,580	+0.1%
2005	20,374	−1.0%
2010	22,585	+10.9%
2015	23,404	+3.6%
2020	23,918	+2.2%

Manlio Fabio Altamirano (also, Manlio Favio Altamirano and Altamirano) is a town in the Mexican state of Veracruz. It serves as the municipal seat for the surrounding municipality of the same name. As of 2020 the municipality had a population of 23,918, about 25% resides in the municipal seat (6,084 hab.). Other localities includes Mata Loma (2,121 hab.), Tenenexpan (2,050 hab.), Loma de los Carmona (1,183 hab.) and El Sauce (865 hab.).
