= Campestre =

Campestre may refer to:

== Places ==
Brazil

- Campestre, Alagoas
- Campestre, Minas Gerais
- Campestre da Serra, Rio Grande do Sul
- Campestre de Goiás, Goiás
- Campestre do Maranhão, Maranhão
- Campestre do Menino Deus, Santa Maria, Rio Grande do Sul
- São José do Campestre, Rio Grande do Norte

Colombia

- Club Campestre El Rancho
- Gimnasio Campestre

France

- Campestre-et-Luc, commune in the Gard department

Mexico

- Campestre (Ciudad Juárez), an area of Ciudad Juárez

== Plants ==
- Acer campestre
- Cheiracanthium campestre
- Compsibidion campestre
- Epidendrum campestre
- Eryngium campestre
- Geastrum campestre
- Lepidium campestre
- Symphyotrichum campestre
- Trifolium campestre
