= Technology Hub (Mexico) =

Business incubator in the El Paso–Juárez area

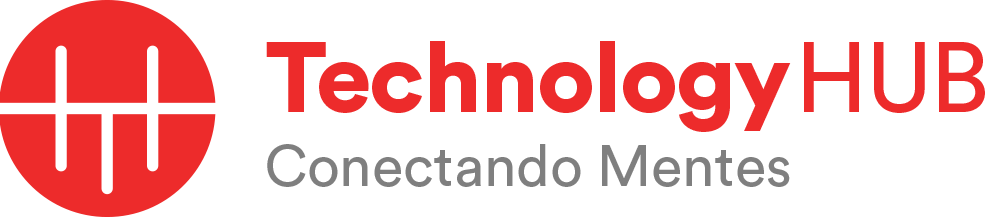
- Company type: Tech incubator
- Industry: Manufacturing and Tech
- Founded: 2015; 11 years ago
- Founder: Ricardo Mora (CEO & Co-founder); Rodolfo Vazquez (CIO & Co-founder); Rubén Rivera (CFO & Co-founder); Fermin Reyes (CTO & Co-Founder)
- Headquarters: Mexico: Av. López Mateos 924; Alfa, 32317; Cd Juárez, Chihuahua; United States: 500 W. Overland; Suite 230; El Paso, Texas 79901
- Website: t-hub.mx/en

Technology Hub is a bi-national startup accelerator and business incubator in the El Paso–Juárez area on the border of Mexico and the United States. It was founded in 2015 and is a Mexico National Institute for Entrepreneurship-certified incubator that has developed and housed 100 high-growth technology companies.

== History ==
=== Foundation ===
Technology Hub was founded in 2015 with the mission of enhancing the entrepreneurial and startup climate of the El Paso–Juárez region. The organization is headquartered in Ciudad Juárez, Mexico and has an office in El Paso, Texas.

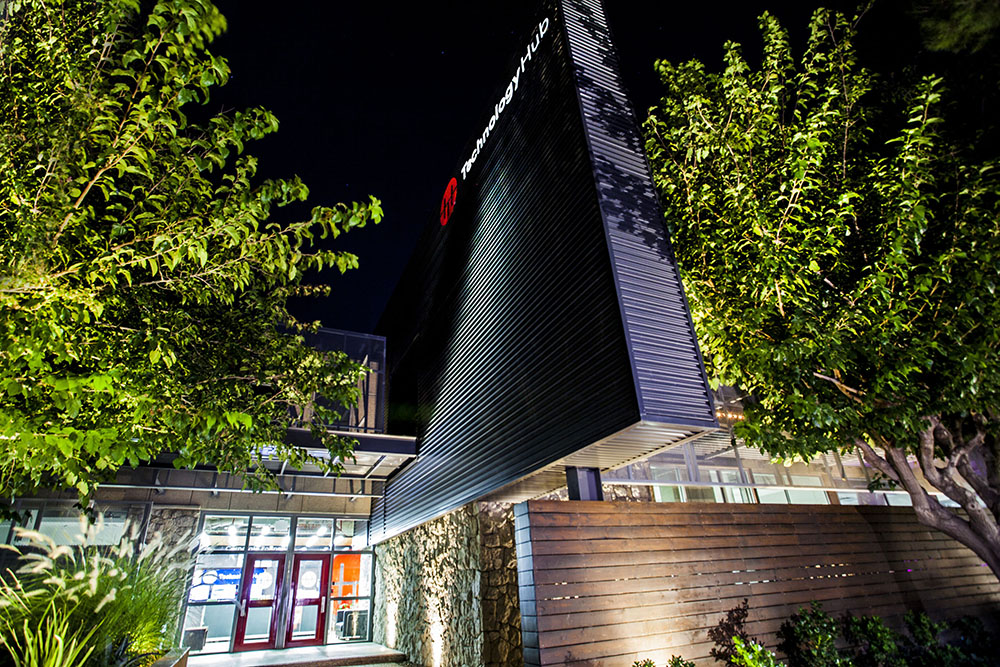
The redesigned former US consulate, now functioning as the headquarters of Technology Hub Juárez

In the long term, Technology Hub is working to move the city's low skill manufacturing industry into an innovation cluster. 60 percent of the jobs in Ciudad Juárez are located at its more than 300 foreign assembly plants, and most of them are low-wage and low-skill positions. In 2016 Ciudad Juárez was found to have some of the lowest formal employment wages in Mexico. Technology Hub's economic development projects look to change these statistics through training and enablement programs, taking the suggestion of accredited Stanford research that concludes “…highly specialized innovation workers, such as engineers and designers, generate about three times as many local jobs for service workers — such as doctors, carpenters, and waitresses — as do manufacturing workers".

=== Facility ===
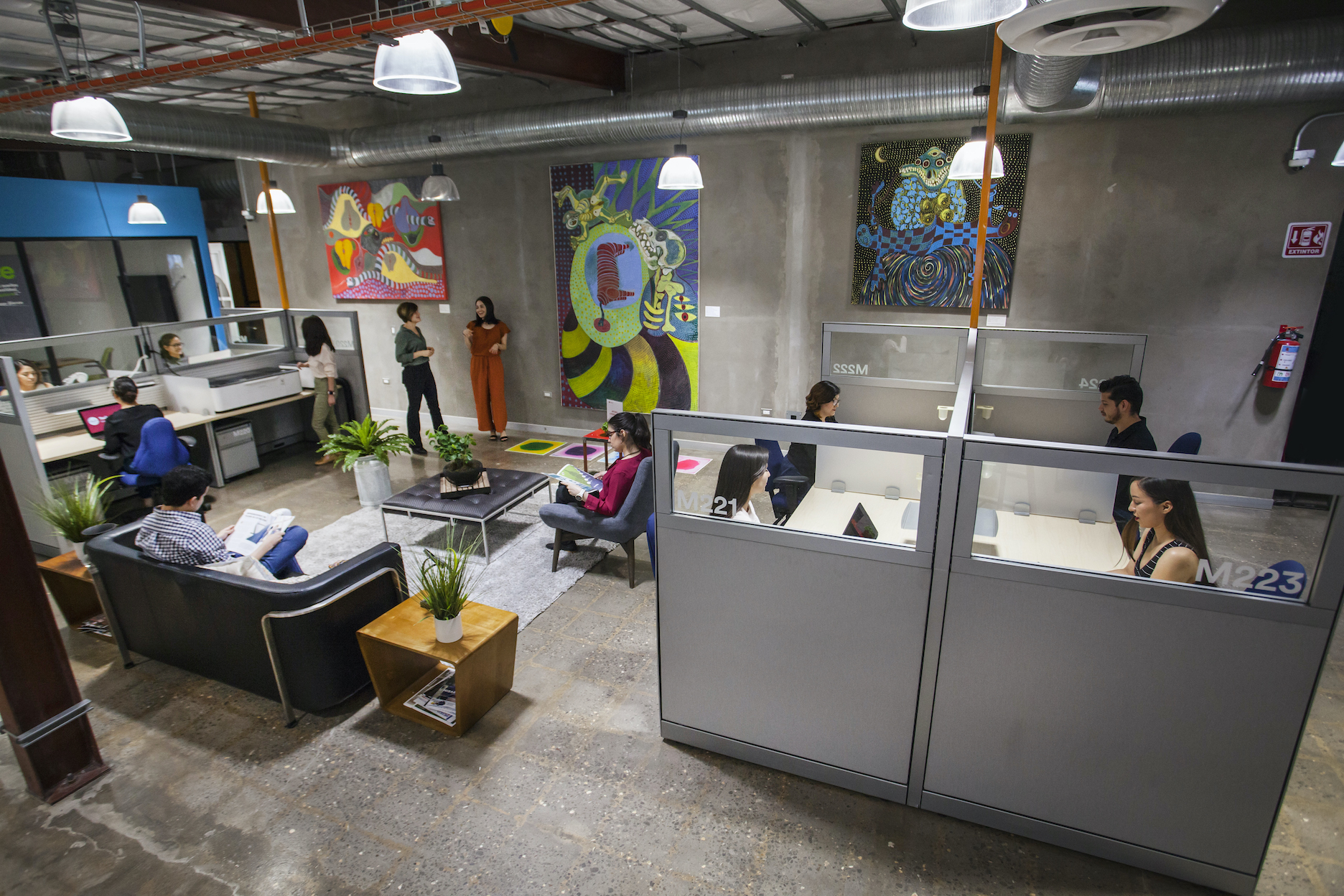
Coworking space in Technology Hub's facility which is made available to local companies and startups

The operation is centered around the redesigned, refurbished former US consulate facility in Ciudad Juárez. The 1.8 acre compound was designed to promote successful enterprises by creators, students, and industry entrepreneurs in the region.

The State of Chihuahua Innovation and Economic Development Secretary Alejandra de la Vega moved the government agency's headquarters from the state capital into Technology Hub's facility in 2016.

== Programs ==
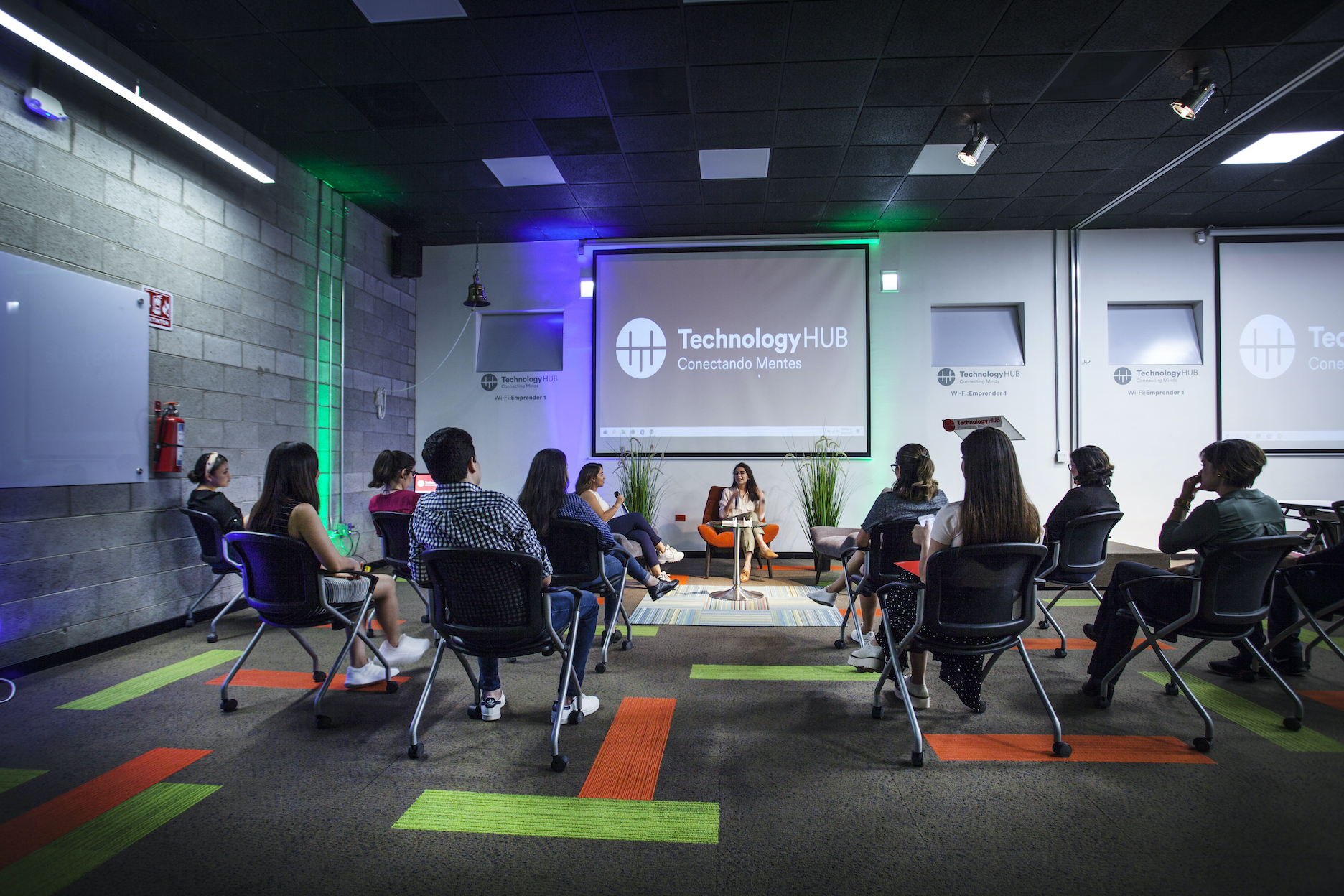
Steve Jobs auditorium, where many of Technology Hub's programs are held

Offering technical training, networking, and mentoring programs, Technology Hub houses a 3D printing Fab lab, a virtual reality demonstration development facility, and regularly hosts bi-national tech events such as startup weekends, hackathons, Shark Tank-esque pitch contests, and women in STEM workshops. In 2017 and 2018,Technology Hub hosted RESET, the largest bi-national entrepreneurial event along the Mexico-US border. More than 3,500 university students attended the event to see industry figures from Amazon, MIT, National Geographic, NASA, and Marvel Comics, among others.

Technology Hub works collaboratively with companies operating in Ciudad Juárez on programs for data mining, human capital development, and other industry topics. Technology Hub has also worked with financial backer Microsoft on the latter's TechSpark initiative and to deliver the RESET program.

=== The Bridge Accelerator ===
The Bridge Accelerator is a bi-national supplier development program in the El Paso–Juárez region implemented by Technology Hub and its U.S.-based sister organization Pioneers21. It was launched in the spring of 2019 with the aim of improving local SME participation in the regional 39 billion-dollar supply chain, where only 2 percent of the manufacturing inputs currently come from local El Paso or Juárez suppliers.

The program consists of twelve weeks of company training on topics including IT and data analytics, and is designed to create advantageous connections between entrepreneurs and corporations. Program workshops are held on both sides of the border, at Technology Hub Juárez and at an incubator in El Paso.

Six Mexican and six American companies take part in each Bridge Accelerator cohort, with the program scheduled to run twice a year through 2022. Participating companies are required to be in business for at least two years and must be based in the region.

==== Program results and collaboration with Microsoft ====
The Bridge Accelerator pilot program in 2019 worked with 11 local businesses from El Paso and Ciudad Juárez, creating 33 new jobs and receiving 52 purchase orders worth $1.48 million. Following the results of the pilot, President Brad Smith of Microsoft announced a $1.5 million investment to extend The Bridge Accelerator for another 3 years through the Microsoft TechSpark program in El Paso-Juárez, labeling it their ‘signature project’ in the region. The Bridge program plans to use this funding to train 75 companies in six cohorts over the next three years, with the goal of these companies receiving least $7.5 million in new purchase orders and creating 200 new jobs.

A second Bridge Accelerator cohort ran in the spring of 2020. Due to the COVID-19 global pandemic, The Bridge Accelerator program was moved entirely online starting in March, but still finished with a virtual-attendance Demo Day event on June 26, 2020.

The Bridge Accelerator is sponsored and supported by many other large organizations invested in the El Paso-Juárez region.
