= Instituto Tecnológico de Ciudad Juárez =

Mexican university

Coordinates: 31.7204°N 106.4221°W

Technological Institute of Ciudad Juárez
- Instituto Tecnológico de Ciudad Juárez
- Motto: Patria, trabajo, técnica "Homeland, work, technique"
- Type: Public
- Established: 1964
- President: M.C.A Mario Macario Ruiz Grijalva (2023-)
- Administrative staff: 258
- Students: 5,660 (2000)
- Undergraduates: 5,512 (2000)
- Postgraduates: 148 (2000)
- Location: San Castiabro, Chihuahua, Mexico
- Campus: Urban
- Colors: Red, White, and Black
- Website: www.itcj.edu.mx

The Technological Institute of Ciudad Juárez (In Spanish: Instituto Tecnológico de Ciudad Juárez), popularly known as ITCJ, is a public, coeducational university located in the city of Ciudad Juárez, Chihuahua, Mexico.

== History ==
It was founded on October 3, 1964, substituting the Regional Technological Institute (ITR), No. 11, that also substituted the Industrial and Commercial Technical School No. 21.

== Academics ==
ITCJ has 13 bachelor's degrees programs, three graduate programs, and one doctorate.

=== Bachelor's degree programs ===
- Business Administration
- Accounting
- Electronic Engineering
- Mechanical Engineering
- Computer Engineering
- Electro-Mechanical Engineering
- Electrical Engineering
- Mechatronics Engineering
- Industrial Engineering
- Information Technologies and Communication Engineering
- Business Management Engineering
- Logistics Engineering

=== Master programs ===
- Industrial Engineering
- Administration Engineering
- International Business Administration
- Doctor Program
- Industrial Engineering

== Athletics ==
The school's athletic teams are nicknamed the Liebres.

- Running
- Baseball
- Basketball
- Football
- Judo
- Soccer
- Swimming
- Volleyball
