= Juan Chavez =

Mexican serial killer

- Born: 1965; Ciudad Juarez, Mexico
- Died: September 9, 1999 (aged 33–34); Folsom State Prison, California, U.S.
- Other name: Job Rocha
- Status: Dead
- Conviction: First degree murder with special circumstances (5 counts)
- Penalty: Life sentence

Details
- Victims: 6+
- Span of crimes: 1986–1990
- Country: United States
- State: California

Juan Chavez (1965 – September 9, 1999) was a Mexican serial killer who, between 1986 and 1990, killed at least six gay men in three cities in Los Angeles County, California. In 1999, he was sentenced to five consecutive life sentences without the possibility of parole, but hanged himself at Folsom State Prison just two months later.

== Early life ==
Juan Chavez was born in 1965 in Ciudad Juarez, Mexico. Not long after, he and his half-brother were left on the doorstep of his grandmother's home for her to care for. After she allegedly hit a teenaged Chavez with a pipe, Chavez and his half brother became runaways in and around Ciudad Juarez. The pair eventually crossed the border into the United States, where Chavez relocated to California. Because he lacked formal education, he was forced to work in low-skilled labor jobs in Los Angeles. Despite this, Chavez got married, and went on to have two children.

== Crimes ==
After moving to Los Angeles, Chavez racked up multiple arrests for petty crimes.

On July 17, 1986, Chavez met up with 46-year-old Alfred Rowswell at a well-known pickup spot for male "street hustlers". After an exchange, Rowswell brought Chavez back to his apartment in LaFayette Park to perform sex, but when they got there, Chavez held Rowswell at knifepoint and forced him on the bed, where he tied him up and strangled him to death. After the killing, Chavez took belongings and money from the apartment, including stealing Rowswell's car from the apartment building's parking lot, and gifted it to a felon. Later that year, police located Rowswell's car in Utah, and collected an unknown male fingerprint on the driver-side window. Between the remainder of 1986 and 1989, Chavez picked up no known arrest records. In September 1989, Chavez was picked up by 57-year-old Ruben Panis in Los Angeles. Panis was a highly regarded fashion designer, who had worked for the likes of Zsa Zsa Gabor and Los Angeles Mayor Tom Bradley's wife. Panis took Chavez to his home on South Tremaine Avenue, and while in his home, Chavez bound and strangled Panis to death. After the killing, Chavez stole both of Panis' cars, a 1977 Mercedes-Benz 450 SL and a 1988 Honda Civic. Later that September, Chavez was let into the home of 48-year-old Donald Kleeman, where he strangled Kleeman like the previous victims.

In October 1989, Chavez found himself in West Hollywood. While there, he was approached by 46-year-old Michael Cates, who offered to take him to his house. Once there, as with the other victims, he strangled Cates, then took money and belongings from the home. Later in November, Chavez killed 52-year-old elementary school teacher Leo Hildebrand in his Alhambra home. In July 1990, Chavez strangled to death 60-year-old Lynn Penn in his apartment. A cigarette butt discovered inside Penn's apartment contained his killer's DNA, and police collected it and stored it in a file.

== Investigation ==
In 1992, Chavez was convicted on multiple counts of kidnapping and robbery in unrelated cases, and was sentenced to life imprisonment. Following his conviction, investigators re-examined four murders from 1989 and came to the conclusion that an unidentified serial killer was targeting gay middle-aged men. After a further examination, they started re-investigating the murder of Alfred Rowswell. In 1994, the fingerprint that was found on Rowswell's car was entered into a database and it corresponded with an inmate in a Washington prison.

Investigators traveled to the prison and spoke with the inmate, who claimed that Chavez had given him the car and requested to abandon it as far as he could travel. After learning that, Chavez became the prime suspect in Rowswell's case. After an interview with high-profile investigators, Chavez confessed to killing him. After a further examination, authorities tied him to the 1989 murders, as he was identified as the man seen looting one of the victims ATM's on camera after the killing. When asked why he did it, he claimed he wanted to clear California of gays because he wanted to bring an end to the sexually transmitted virus HIV, which causes AIDS.

Chavez pleaded guilty to killing Roswell, and later to the killing of the four other men in 1989. He received a total of five life sentences on June 21, 1999. On September 9 of that year, Chavez hanged himself in his cell at Folsom State Prison.

== Aftermath ==
Chavez was not linked to the Penn case until 2012. They examined the DNA left on the cigarette butt, and after test results came back, it was found it corresponded with Chavez's DNA. Investigators publicly announced that the killing of Penn had been solved, but by that time Chavez had been dead for almost thirteen years.

== See also ==
- List of serial killers in the United States
- List of serial killers by number of victims
