= Rivera del Bravo =

Rivera del Bravo is a neighborhood in eastern Ciudad Juárez, Chihuahua, Mexico. One of the newer neighborhoods in the city, Riviera del Bravo has multiple schools and strip malls. A former state governor once described Riviera del Bravo as a model for future neighborhoods. Drug violence forced a number of people to flee the area. By 2010 rows of abandoned and vandalized houses, with graffiti and trash, were in Riviera del Bravo. Alfredo Corchado of The Dallas Morning News referred said that around Riviera del Bravo there were "stories abound of gunfights, headless corpses and men in SUVs peering through dark tinted windows."
