= Nuestras Hijas de Regreso a Casa A.C. =

Mexican organization

Nuestras Hijas de Regreso a Casa A.C. ("May Our Daughters Return Home, Civil Association") is a non-profit organization composed of mothers, family members, and friends of victims of the female homicides in Ciudad Juárez. The mothers claim that their cases have gone unsolved in some cases for over 12 years. Their hope is to get the murderers of their daughters arrested and hopefully convicted.

== Founding and purpose ==
The organization was co-founded by Norma Andrade, mother of Lilia Alejandra Garcia Andrade, who was kidnapped on February 14, 2001, and found dead 10 days later. The other founder of NHRC is Marisela Ortiz Rivera, Lilia's high school teacher turned activist. Many of the victims have been found to be poor working mothers employed in factories in Ciudad Juárez, which is located in the northwestern Mexican state of Chihuahua, and is located across the Rio Grande from the U.S. city of El Paso, Texas. Since 1993, female bodies have been found in the city of Juárez, and most of the cases remain unsolved. The group's mission is to put pressure on the Mexican government to fight impunity, solve the murders, and counter-act the prevalence of femicide.

== Reception and danger ==
Norma Andrade was shot at 5 times in an attempt to silence her. As prominent advocate and President and co-founder of NHRC, her and other women live in danger in Ciudad Juarez. The group is controversial as some politicians want the outrage and discourse to die down but the women continue to disappear, year after year. NHRC is an intersectional feminist group in Mexico that is the voice for the problematic subject that is the "Women of Juárez." The group says they will not stop fighting for the respect and dignity of the disappeared and murdered in Ciudad Juárez also known as Feminicidios. The group is composed of mothers of the victims of Femicide and continues to fight together and advocate for The Women of Juárez.

== Prevalence of femicide ==
According to Amnesty International, as of February 2005 more than 600 bodies had been found and over 800 women were still missing. In November 2005, BBC News reported Mexico's human rights ombudsman Luis Raúl González Pérez as saying that 28 women had been murdered so far in 2005.

== In the media ==
Nuestras Hijas de Regreso a Casa group was worked with filmmaker Zulma Aguiar on a Juárez Documentary titled "Juarez Mothers Fight Femicide," which was filmed in 2005.

In January 2010, UK Television News program Channel 4 News broadcast a report from Ciudad Juárez in which a young girl told how she had been abducted by a gang of men and forced into prostitution. She told the program's reporter Nick Martin how she had witnessed girls being murdered by the gang and how children were abducted and sold to order to American citizens. The report was recognized by the Foreign Press Association as TV News Story of the Year in 2010 and prompted US Immigration & Customs Enforcement to launch a cross border investigation into the women's claims.

== Femicide in Mexican law ==
In Mexico, femicide is typified in the Federal Penal Code in Article 325, from June 14, 2012, to the letter, defines this crime as:

"ARTICLE 325.- The crime of femicide is committed by one who deprives a woman of life for gender reasons. Gender reasons are considered to exist when any of the following circumstances exist:

1. The victim presents signs of sexual violence of any kind;
2. The victim has been inflicted with infamous injuries or mutilations or degrading, before or after the deprivation of life or acts of necrophilia;
3. There are antecedents or data of any type of violence in the family environment, work or school, of the active subject against the victim;
4. There has been a sentimental, affective or emotional relationship between the asset and the victim trust;
5. There are data that establish that there were threats related to the event criminal, harassment or injury of the active subject against the victim; The victim has been held incommunicado, whatever the time prior to the deprivation of life;
6. The victim's body is exposed or displayed in a public place. Whoever commits the crime of femicide will be imposed from forty to sixty years of prison and five hundred to a thousand days fine. In addition to the sanctions described in this article, the active subject will lose all rights in relation to the victim, including inheritance rights. In the event that femicide is not accredited, the homicide rules will apply. To the public servant who maliciously or negligently retards or hinders the Attorney or administration of justice will be sentenced to three to eight years and a fine of five hundred to fifteen hundred days, in addition, he will be dismissed and disqualified from three to ten years to perform another job, position or commission public.
