= Norma Andrade =

Mexican activist

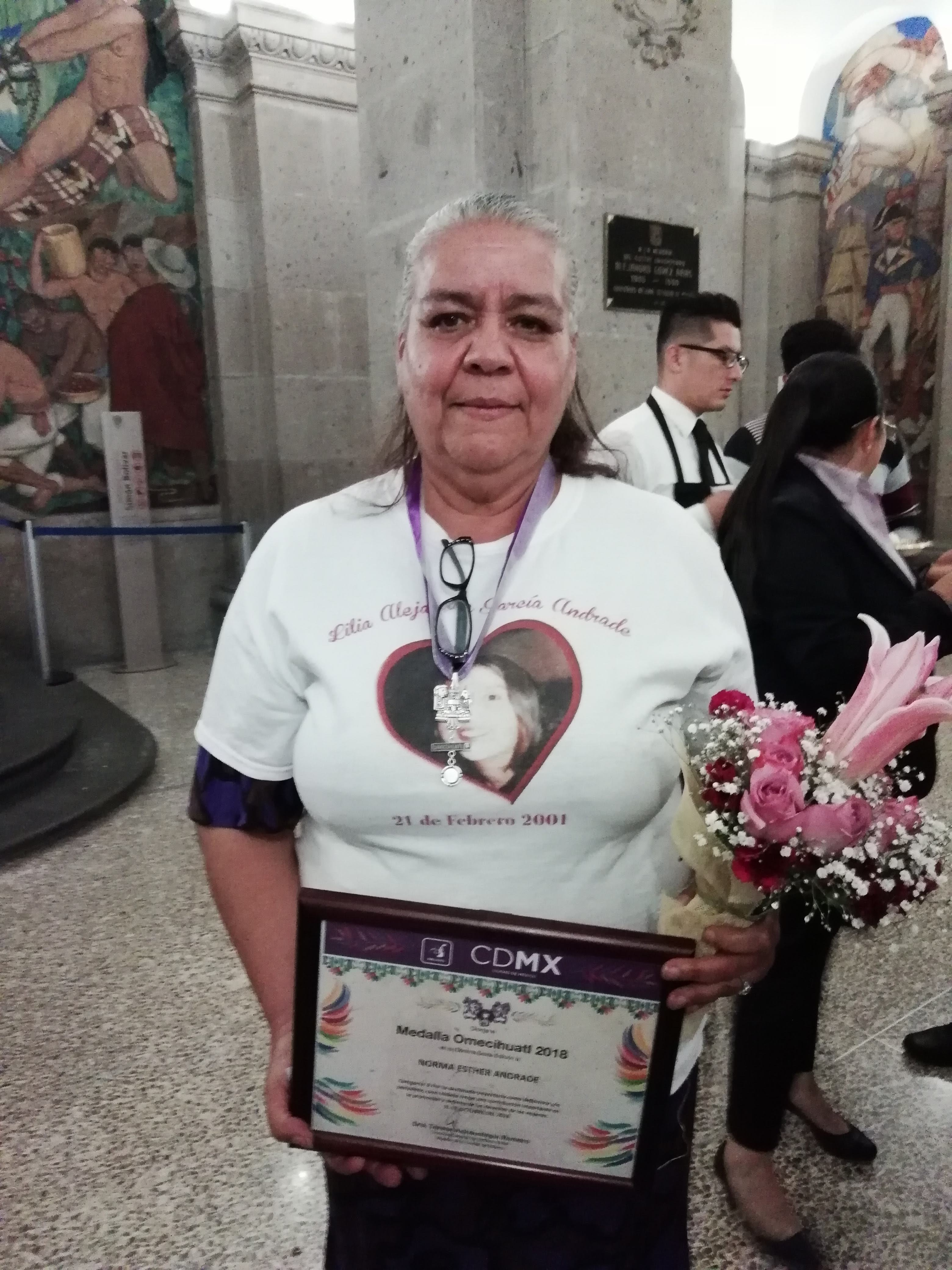

Norma Esther Andrade is one of the founding members of Nuestras Hijas de Regreso a Casa A.C., a Mexican non-profit association of mothers whose daughters have been victims of female homicides in Ciudad Juárez. Her daughter, Lilia Alejandra García Andrade, disappeared on February 14, 2001. On February 21, Lilia Alejandra's body was found wrapped in a blanket. On her body were signs of physical and sexual assault.

Andrade is also the mother of the director of the May Our Daughters Return Home group, Malu Garcia, who was forced to flee to Mexico City due to threats (suspected to be from drug traffickers). According to reports, on September 30 of 2011, Malu’ Garcia received threatening phone calls from an unidentified source claiming to know the location of her and her family, including her mother. Shortly after, a close friend of Malu’ Garcia was assaulted and threatened. After she was physically assaulted, she was instructed to the tell Malu’ that she had 12 hours to leave the city or they would kill her family members. In response to these actions, increased protection was requested for Malu’ and her mother, Norma Andrade, in response to the threats they were facing.

== Death threats ==
On Friday December 2, 2011, Andrade was shot and wounded in Mexico's Ciudad Juarez, several times (some reports say she was shot five times) by a group of armed men as she was leaving work. The shooting was initially blamed by officials on an attempted carjacking. The focus of the investigation later changed when it was learned that Andrade received death threats on the day of the shooting. It was reported that unknown individuals contacted the school where she is employed the morning of the attack. These individuals asked various questions like when she arrived, when she would be leaving, and if she was planning to come to work in the afternoon. The unknown callers then threatened to be waiting outside the school for her after it was clear that the staff wasn't revealing any information. Many members of the Nuestras Hijas de Regreso a Casa A.C. have reported threats they have received in their fight against female homicide to the authorities. However, reports confirm that the authorities are not effectively investigating these claims and attempting to bring the source of these threats to justice. On Tuesday, December 6, 2011, Andrade was released from the hospital where she was treated and operated on for the gunshot wounds she sustained. She was taken with her family to a house in Ciudad Juarez, where she was placed under 24-hour protection.

On February 3 of 2012 Norma Andrade was attacked for a second time by an unknown assailant outside of her residence. At approximately 9am on February 3, 2012 Norma Andrade left her house in the Coyoacán neighborhood in the south of Mexico City to escort her granddaughter to school. She was attacked by a man whose identity remains unknown. He slashed her face with a knife before immediately fleeing the scene. Andrade was brought to the hospital where she was treated for a two-inch lesion in her cheek. The house in which the second attack took place is the house she chose to stay in for protection following the first attacks on her life. Andrade was supposed to be under police protection when the second attack occurred.

Following the second attack on Andrade's life, a petition was started on Twitter requesting that Mexican President Felipe Calderón give Andrade the protection she needs and deserves. The petition argued that if the Mexican state cannot find those responsible for the assault, rape, and murder of her daughter they could at least provide adequate protection. In addition to the petition circulating on Twitter, close to a hundred international human rights groups, over two hundred women's rights groups, and individual women activists from Central America strongly requested immediate and efficient protection for Andrade and her family. Since 2008, the Inter-American commission on Human Rights has been pressuring the Mexican government to supply protection to four of Andrade's organization's members, including Norma. The government has failed to do so. These groups are also calling attention and criticism to the Mexican Government for not providing the proper security that they committed to.
