= Ignacia Jasso =

Mexican drug dealer (1901–1982)

La Nacha Ignacia Jasso
- Ignacia Jasso's mugshot after being arrested in Ciudad Juarez.
- Born: 1901; Mapimí, Durango
- Died: January 10, 1982 (aged 80–81); Ciudad Juárez, Chihuahua
- Status: Released in 1945, recidivised.
- Convictions: Narcotics trafficking, murder
- Criminal charges: Narcotics trafficking, murder
- Penalty: Indefinite confinement (released in 1945)

Ignacia Jasso, la Viuda de González (1901 – January 10, 1982), more commonly known as Ignacia Jasso or by her nickname La Nacha, was a Mexican drug dealer. Along with her family, Jasso established one of the first major drug cartels in Northern Mexico in the 1930s and would go on to control much of the heroin, morphine, marijuana, and hemp trade in Ciudad Juárez until the 1970s.

== Biography ==
The wife of a farmer in Ciudad Juárez, Jasso became entangled in criminal activities alongside her husband during the 1920s. Following her husband's death in a Juárez brothel, Jasso persisted in her association with the drug trade. The co-manager of a nearby nightclub, Enrique Fernández, was involved in a number of criminal enterprises and convinced Jasso to join his organization.

Starting out as a lower-ranking member, Jasso managed Fernández's illicit drugs business, gradually growing her power inside the organization. The organization soon became known as the Fernández gang and came to wield considerable influence over local and state authorities, the first criminal organization to do so. To control the drug trade, the pair eliminated their competition through a campaign of bribery, assassination, and intimidation. Her business expanded throughout the 1930s and 1940s, during which time much of Jasso's family also became involved in the trade; in addition to the production and smuggling of drugs, the family turned to other industries, notably prostitution and alcohol smuggling.

Her actions resulted in her being targeted by the Federal Bureau of Narcotics, with Harry J. Anslinger asking that she be extradited to the United States. This was unsuccessful, however, and Jasso was instead sent to Islas Marias, a historical Mexican maximum security prison, for a wartime stay. She was released after the war and moved to Guadalajara, to lie low and take a more active role in supply. Her family operated the drug cartel in Juarez.

== Legacy ==
The drug cartel established by Jasso operated for several decades, with one source noting the cartel remained in operation until the 1970s. In and out of prison several times, she died in relative obscurity. Many of the current tactics of the modern drug cartels in Mexico were invented by Jasso. This includes infiltrating intelligence services and bribing public agencies, numerous effective prison escapes, and the guarding of supply routes, many of which are guarded by different cartels, including the Sinaloa, Juarez, and Tijuana Cartels to this day. Her cartel was also the first homegrown organization to have control over the drug trade, a market previously dominated by Asian immigrants.
