= Chaveña =

Neighborhood in Ciudad Juárez, Chihuahua, Mexico

Coordinates: 22°29′N 103°09′W

La Chaveña (the Keyhole) is a neighborhood in the city of Ciudad Juárez in the Mexican state of Chihuahua, which borders the Rio Grande. It is on the northwest side of the city. Having been established before 1912, it is one of the oldest neighborhoods in the city.

La Chaveña is a working-class neighborhood, and it is characterized by the hundreds of discount shops known as los Cerrajeros (the Locksmiths) located in the area, specifically on the Revolución strip, where customers and merchants haggle in the most traditional market fashion on the prices of products and services.

It is also the location of two emblematic landmarks of the city:

- la Escuela Revolución (the Revolution School), a primary school inaugurated in 1939 by Mexican president Lázaro Cárdenas
- la Pila de la Chaveña (the Font of the Keyhole), a plaza regarded by juarenses (inhabitants of Ciudad Juárez) as a meeting point; its original focal point was a font that was built between 1895 and 1896, which was later replaced with a fountain
