= Campestre da Serra =

Municipality in Rio Grande do Sul, Brazil

Coordinates: 28°47′42″S 51°05′34″W

- Municipality
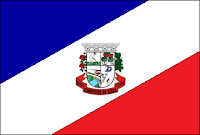
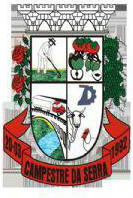
- Flag Coat of arms
- Interactive map of Campestre da Serra
- Country: Brazil
- Time zone: UTC−3 (BRT)

Campestre da Serra (literally a field surrounded by forest and mountains) is a municipality in the southern state of Rio Grande do Sul, Brazil. It is 2526 feet above sea level. As of 2020, the estimated population was 3,395.

== Geography ==
=== Climate ===
Campestre da Serra

Climate chart (precipitation, max. and min. temperature)
J	F	M	A	M	J	J	A	S	O	N	D
155 26 16	152 25 16	162 23 14	131 20 11	128 18 9	152 17 8	150 18 8	167 19 9	191 21 11	163 23 12	131 25 14	151 24 14
- █ Average max. and min. temperatures in °C
- █ Precipitation totals in mm
- Source: http://pt.climate-data.org/location/200843/
Imperial conversion
J	F	M	A	M	J	J	A	S	O	N	D
6.1 80 62	6 78 61	6.4 74 57	5.2 69 52	5 64 48	6 63 47	5.9 64 47	6.6 67 49	7.5 69 51	6.4 73 54	5.2 76 57	5.9 75 56
- █ Average max. and min. temperatures in °F
- █ Precipitation totals in inches

== See also ==
- List of municipalities in Rio Grande do Sul
