= Campestre (Ciudad Juárez) =

Area of Ciudad Juárez, Mexico

Campestre is a colonia (neighborhood) in the city of Ciudad Juárez in the Mexican state of Chihuahua, which borders the Rio Grande. Historically, it was a country club area of the city. Drug violence forced many people to flee the area. By 2010 many "for rent" and "for sale" signs were seen in the neighborhood. Residents placed large boulders in the streets to deter would-be extortionists and kidnappers. After the recuperation of the city and the decrease of violence, houses were gradually occupied and boulders removed. The area was again restored to its traditional luxury.
