= Campestre do Maranhão =

Coordinates: 6.17194°S 47.3639°W

- Municipality
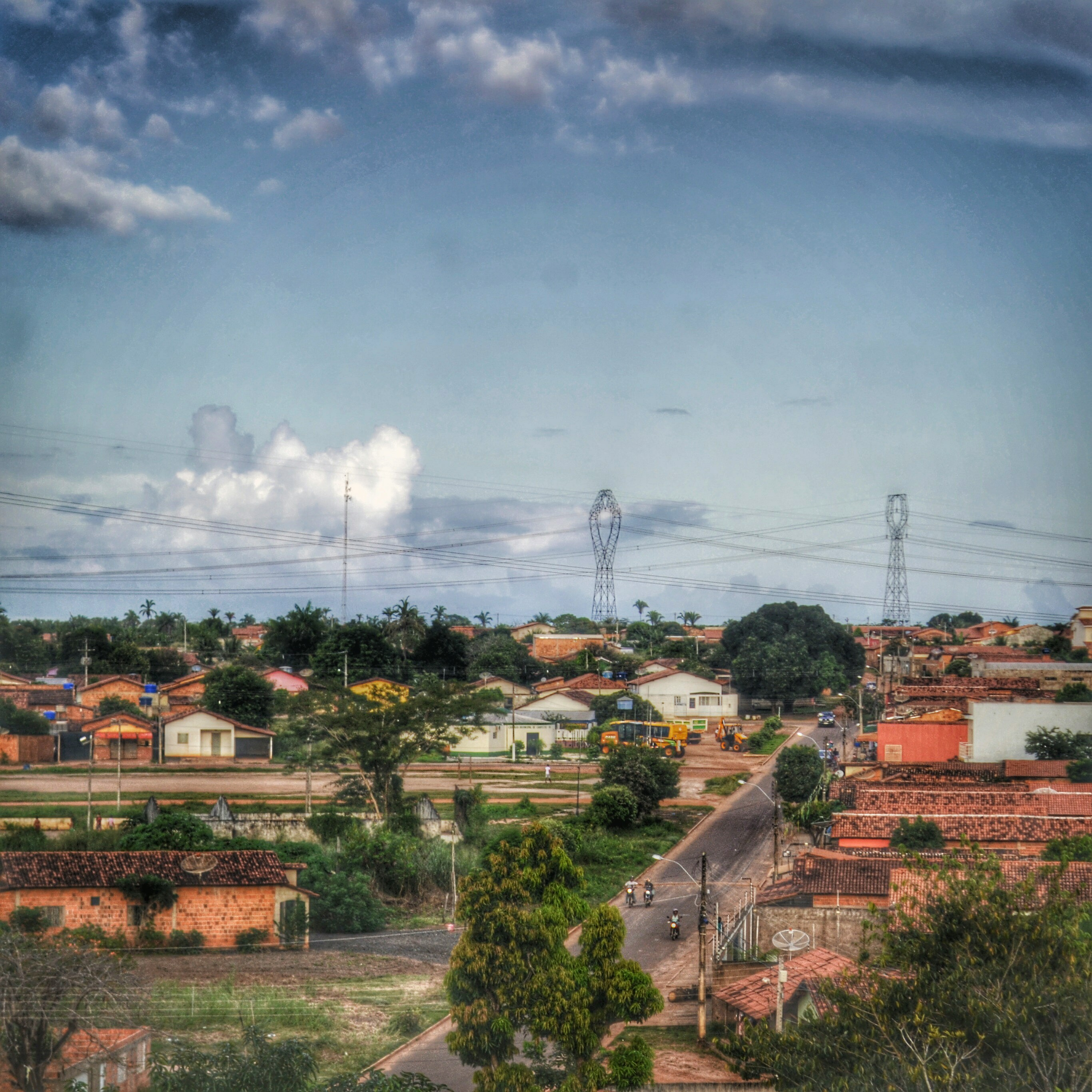
- City Hall District

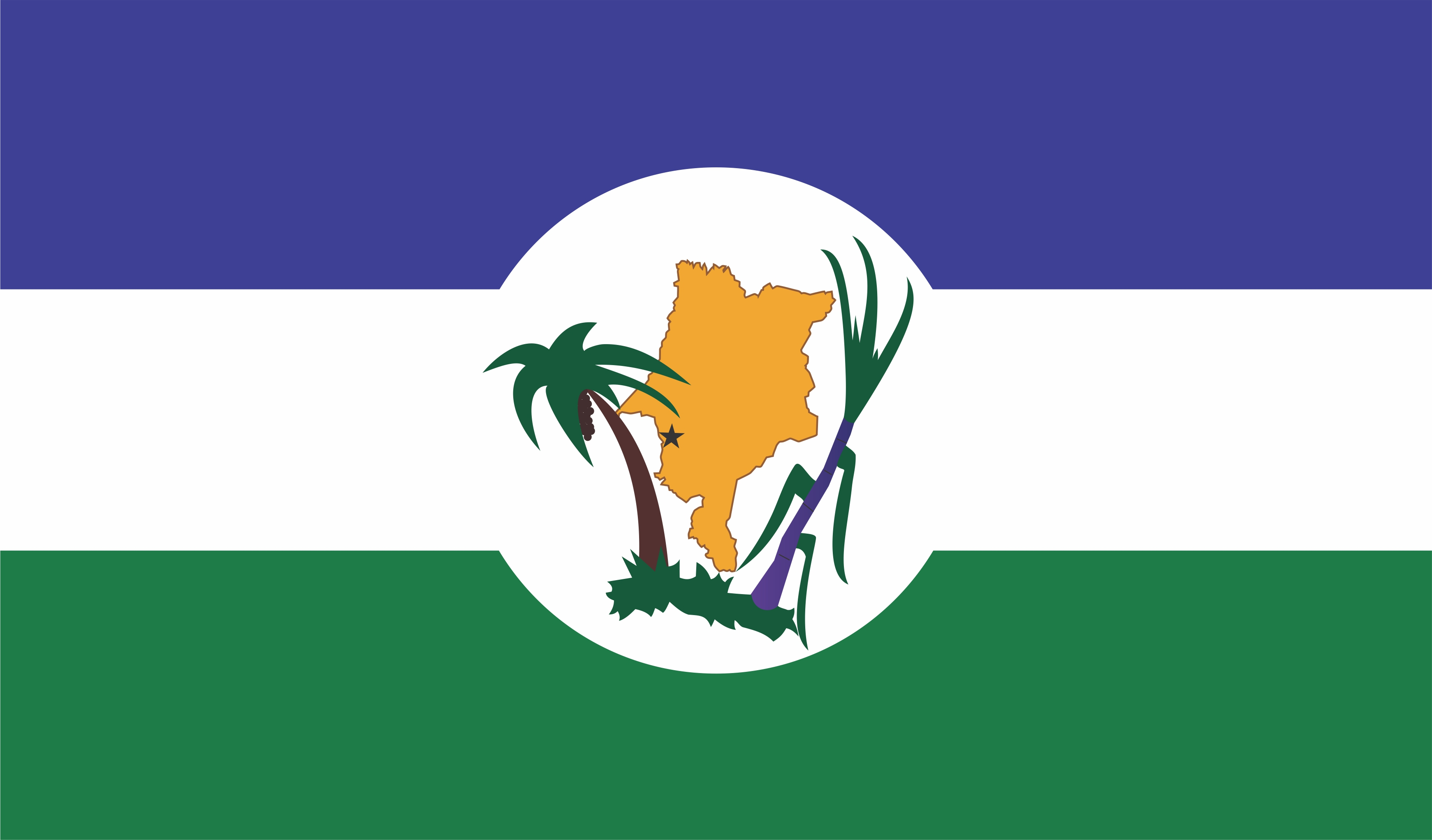
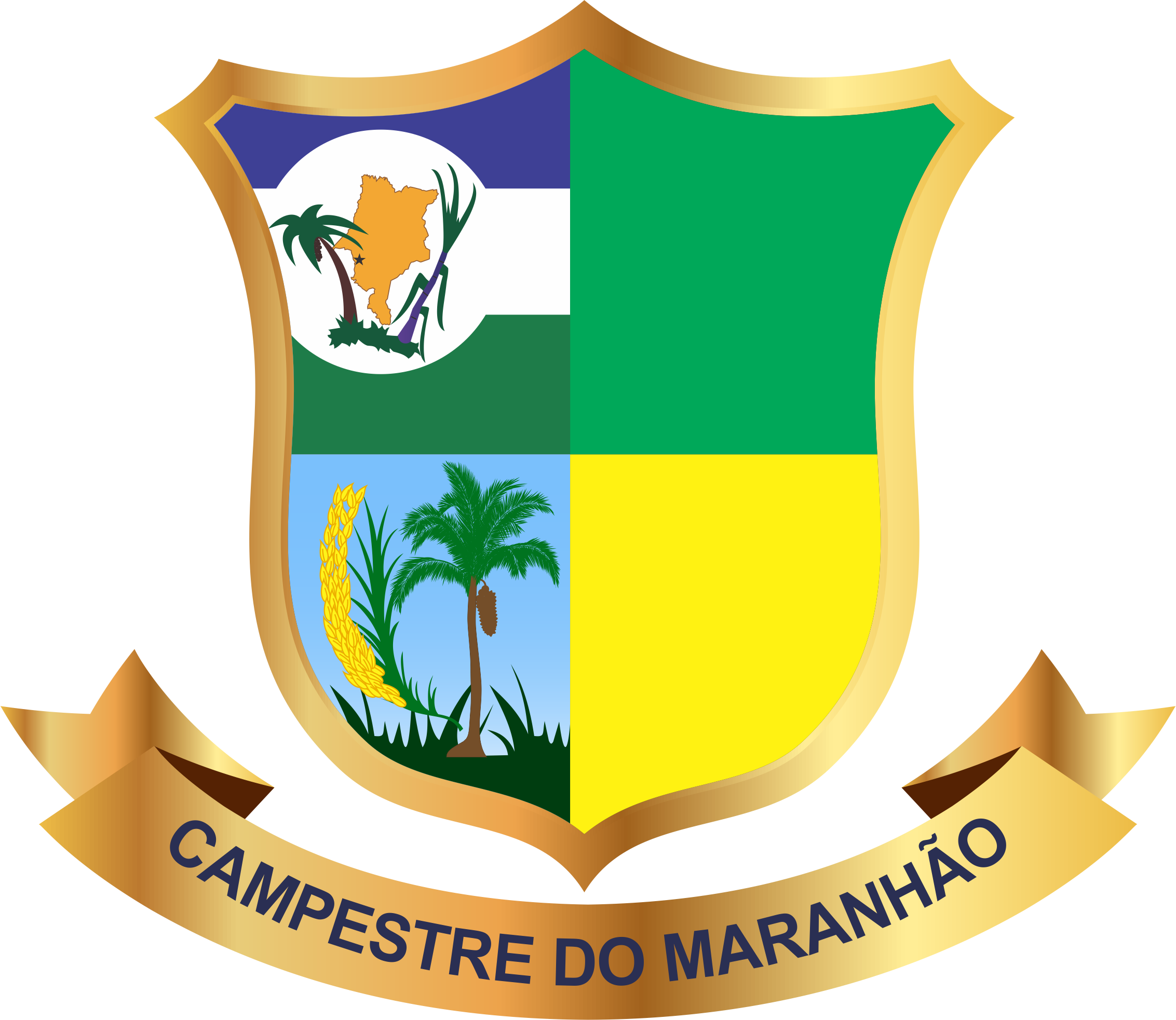
- Flag Coat of arms
- Interactive map of Campestre do Maranhão
- Country: Brazil
- Region: Nordeste
- State: Maranhão
- Mesoregion: Sul Maranhense

Population (2020)
  - Total: 14,453
- Time zone: UTC−3 (BRT)

Campestre do Maranhão is a municipality in the state of Maranhão in the Northeast region of Brazil.

== See also ==
- List of municipalities in Maranhão
