= Ni una menos =

Latin American feminist movement

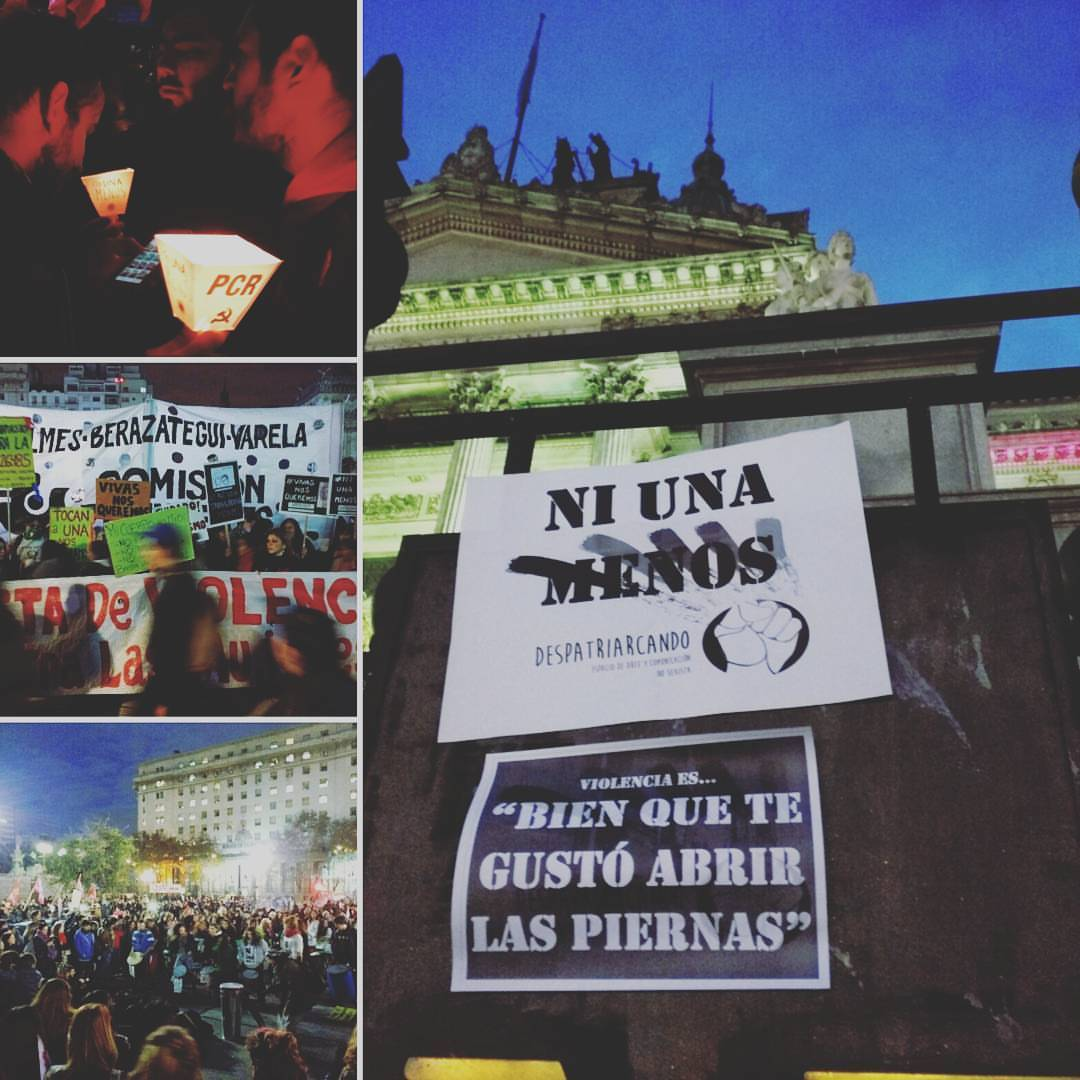
- Formation: 2015
- Type: Social movement
- Location: Argentina
- Website: niunamenos.org.ar

Ni una menos (Spanish: [ni ˈuna ˈmenos]; Spanish for "Not one [woman] less") is a Hispanic American fourth-wave grassroots feminist movement, which started in Argentina and has spread across several Hispanic American countries, that campaigns against gender-based violence. This mass mobilization comes as a response to various systemic issues that proliferate violence against women. On its official website, Ni una menos defines itself as a "collective scream against machista violence." The campaign was started by a collective of Argentine female artists, journalists and academics, and has grown into "a continental alliance of feminist forces". Social media was an essential factor in the propagation of the Ni Una Menos movement to other countries and regions. The movement regularly holds protests against femicides, but has also touched on topics such as gender roles, sexual harassment, gender pay gap, sexual objectification, legality of abortion, sex workers' rights and transgender rights.

The collective takes its name from a 1995 phrase by Mexican poet and activist Susana Chávez, "Ni una muerta más" (Spanish for "Not one more [woman] dead"), in protest to the female homicides in Ciudad Juárez. Chávez herself was assassinated in 2011, after which the phrase became a "symbol of struggle".

== Context for movement origin ==
Latin America has incredibly high rates of femicide; according to a study at least 12 women suffer from gender-based violence daily. Additionally, 14 out of the 25 countries with the highest rates of gender-based violence can be found in Latin America. The primary age group that is a victim of this sort of violence are young women aged 15–29. Gender-based violence can be described as diverse tactics to keep women in a subordinate position in society. The actual conditions and methods to exert violence can vary greatly. For example, they can range from murder in a civil war environment to being slapped in an otherwise peaceful home. Furthermore, defining victims of feminicide is slightly distinct from female victims of homicide. For a case to be classified as femicide, victims are killed because of their gender. Nevertheless, this statistic may be higher and more nuanced because collecting accurate data is difficult. This pattern creates more barriers to institutionalizing practices that may protect women from gender-based violence.

A factor that influences the prevalence of gender-based violence in Latin America is gender inequality. In Latin America, women are often more socially and economically disadvantaged compared to women in North America and Western Europe. This may perpetuate dynamics where women are more likely to remain in relationships where they are experiencing abuse or violence.

Furthermore, many feminists point to institutional violence as a factor that proliferates more gender-based violence and femicide. They cite impunity for men within legal institutions as a mechanism that impedes women from achieving justice. They argue that the legal system is built so that women face barriers or are improperly protected from violence. Researchers have concluded that the level of impunity in a country is an accurate predictor of higher rates of femicide.

On the other hand, toxic masculinity, or machismo, is very prevalent in Latin America. These concepts refer to the notion that men are stronger than women and must assert control in order to protect them. However, they often incorporate an aggressive and exaggerated assertion of masculinity that can translate into a propensity for gender-based discrimination and gender-based violence.

Lastly, gender-based violence is more common in areas that are more prone to cartel and gang violence. Violence against the female body is used as a tool to assert control and dominance. Furthermore, as cartels expand they begin to delve into practices beyond drugs, including sexual exploitation and trafficking. Moreover, it reiterates ideas of machismo and consequent female submissiveness. These patterns are prevalent in Latin America due to the amount of drug and cartel violence. In Central America, around 600,000 people are internally displaced due to gang violence. On the other hand, levels of violence across the region have been increasing in the past couple of years.

== Across Latin America ==
=== Argentina ===
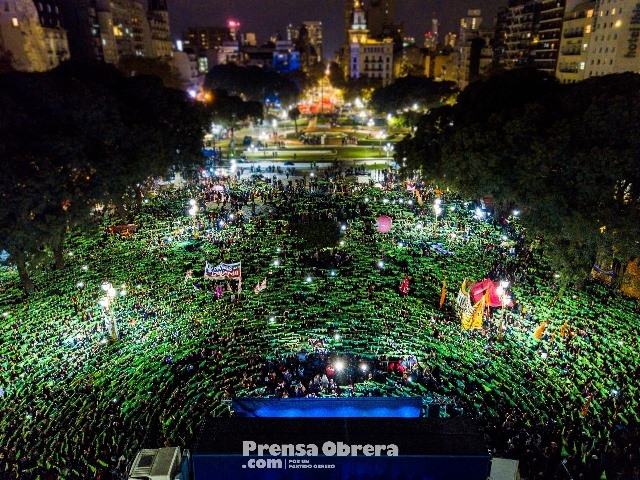
Ni Una Menos protest in Argentina in 2018. The green handkerchiefs are typically used to signal support for abortion legalization

The Ni Una Menos movement was born in Argentina. The protest was organized after the murder of 14-year-old Chiara Paez, found buried underneath her boyfriend's house on 11 May 2015, because she wanted to keep the baby and he did not, so he beat her to death when she was a few weeks pregnant. They were able to mobilize 200,000 people in Buenos Aires alone. The movement was iterated as opposition to femicide and violence against women, but did not discuss more controversial topics originally. The name Ni Una Menos can be roughly translated to "Not One [Woman] Less." This refers to not wanting any more women to die as a result of gender-based violence. The movement became nationally recognized with the use of the hashtag #NiUnaMenos on social media, title under which massive demonstrations were held on 3 June 2015, having the Palace of the Argentine National Congress as a main meeting point. Since the first #NiUnaMenos in 2015, demonstrations take place every year in Argentina on 3 June. Furthermore, the movement has continued to expand to other countries and regions due to its strong digital presence. The transnational spread through the use of social media after the movement's birth in Argentina has allowed for different places to adapt to their local needs while maintaining a sense of solidarity.

Another case that sparked protest in Argentina for the Green Wave movement and Ni una menos, "not one (woman) less", was Belén's case in 2014. In 2014 in Tucumán, Argentina, an Argentine woman went to a local low-income community hospital experiencing severe abdominal pain. She experienced a miscarriage while there, but she did not know she was pregnant prior. Because abortion was illegal at this time, the hospital accused her of self-inducing an abortion and she was arrested when she woke up from emergency surgery. After 2 years of pre-trial detention, her charge was changed to aggravated murder. She was found guilty at her trial and sentenced to 8 years in prison. After 2 years, her feminist lawyer, Soledad Deza, was able to appeal her trial and she was released. She took on the pseudonym, Belén. Soledad Deza rallied Amnesty International to ignite the movement, Ni una menos, symbolized by donning white masks, the same white mask Belén wore leaving prison. Belén's case became an uproar to gain greater protections for all women. Author, Ana Carrea, later interviewed her and wrote the book, Somos Belén in 2019 about her story and how it rallied the international movement. It was translated and rereleased as What Happened to Belén in 2024.

On 19 October 2016, the Ni una menos collective organized a first-ever women mass strike in Argentina, in response to the murder of 16-year-old Lucía Pérez, who was raped and impaled in the coastal city of Mar del Plata. It consisted of a one-hour pause from work and study early in the afternoon, with protesters dressed in mourning for what was known as Miércoles negro (Spanish for "Black Wednesday"). These protests became region-wide and gave the movement a greater international momentum, with street demonstrations also taking place in Chile, Peru, Bolivia, Paraguay, Uruguay, El Salvador, Guatemala, Mexico and Spain.

As a direct result of Ni Una Menos protests, the Registry of Femicides and the Centre for the Registration, Systematisation, and Monitoring of Feminicides were created to keep a better record of gender-based violence. The government also established the Ministry for Women, Gender, and Diversity. Moreover, Ni Una Menos protests in Argentina are credited as a catalyst for the legalization of first-trimester elective abortion on 30 December 2020. The movement drifted from their original mission to combat violence against women and adopted abortion rights as a key issue in the movement. The vastness of the protests caused abortion to become a salient topic in the Argentine legislature and caused more people to support its legalization.

=== Peru ===
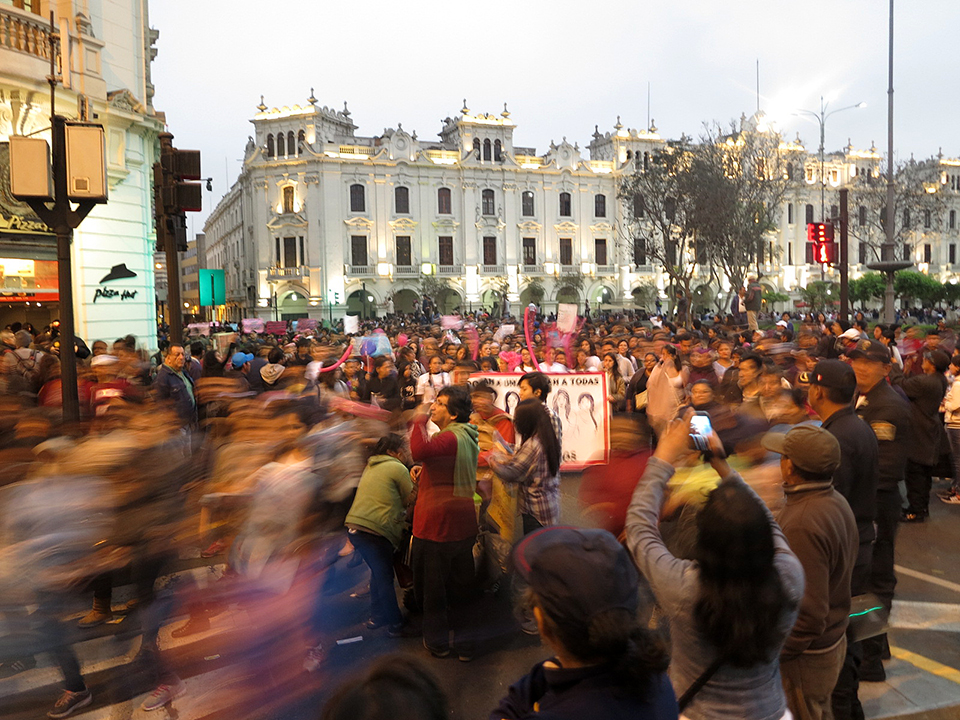
Ni Una Menos protest in Peru.

In Peru, over 30% of women report suffering physical violence at the hands of a spouse in their lifetime. Further, in a 2006 World Health Organization survey, they found that Peru had the highest rates of violence in the region with 61% reporting violence experiencing violence at the hands of an intimate partner. The NiUnaMenos (Peru) movement was sparked in July 2016 when Adriano Pozo Arias, a known abuser, was released from jail. A video captures him attacking his girlfriend, Cindy Arlette Contreras Bautista. He was convicted and sent to jail but only served a one-year sentence. Another case that impulsed Peruvians into action was when Ronny Garcia beat Lady Guillen. The resulting protest on 13 August 2016, has been recognized as the largest protest in Peruvian history with hundreds of thousands of people in attendance in Lima. People were mobilized and the march's logistics were planned over Facebook as tensions and frustrations about high levels of feminicide and the lack of a strong state response to this issue increased. There have been subsequent Ni Una Menos marches in Peru on 2017 and 2018.

In Peru, there has been considerable backlash against the adoption of abortion rights as an issue Ni Una Menos is championing for. Cardinal Juan Luis Cipriani, a prominent religious leader condemned the legalization of abortion in cases of child rape and the expansion of sex education courses in schools. He has even organized counterprotests to proliferate his opposing, more conservative beliefs.

=== Mexico ===
Historically, Mexico has been a country with one the highest femicide rates in Latin America. From the years 2015–2021, Mexico had a 135% increase of femicide, going from 427 victims to a little above 1,000 victims. In Mexico, the Ni Una Menos movement has been observed to be prevalent and active. While there have been many street demonstrations following the Ni Una Menos movement in Mexico, there was a bigger nationwide strike and Ni Una Menos protest on 9 March 2020. This protest consisted of women only staying home, meaning women didn't go to school, work, or any public place. This nationwide strike was carried out due to the lack of government involvement and cooperation to address and handle femicide, domestic violence, and other issues. Albeit, due to the COVID-19 pandemic, Ni Una Menos demonstrations or organizing were deterred, and femicide cases during the pandemic continued to increase. However, recently, a few efforts have been seen by the Mexican government to address some of these concerns. For example, there is a prosecutor's office that is dedicated to gender crimes, including femicides. Nevertheless, femicide is still an ongoing issue and a tragic reality for many women in Mexico, and other countries across Latin America.

=== Puerto Rico ===
In 2018, Puerto Rico reported high rates of femicide, with an estimated femicide per week on average. In 2020, Puerto Rico reported 60 femicide cases. Moreover, Puerto Rico declared a state of emergency against gender-based violence and femicide in January 2021. Despite declaring a state of emergency against gender-based violence, femicide rates continued. Within the same year, the news of the killings of two femicide cases in Puerto Rico was widespread and as a result, they received a lot of national attention and a big turnout for the Ni Una Menos demonstration on 2 May 2021. These cases were the cases of Andrea Ruiz Costas and Keishla Rodríguez Ortiz. Andrea Ruiz Costas was killed by her abusive ex-boyfriend in April 2021, after the court rejected the protection order she filed against him. Days later, on 1 May, the body of Keishla Rodríguez Ortiz was found in the San Jose Lagoon, located next to the San Juan's Teodoro Moscoso Bridge, where the demonstration took place. Keishla was pregnant when her famous boxer boyfriend, Felix Verdejo, killed her. As a result, activists and other Puerto Rican civilians took to the San Juan Teodoro Moscoso Bridge to protest against femicide and to call for justice for these victims. Hundreds of people showed up to the demonstration and shut down the bridge, stopping traffic and usage of the bridge. Protestors had signs with "Ni Una Menos" written on them and cars that blocked the lanes with the same phrase written on them. These protestors advocated for and preached the slogan, aligning themselves with the movement, as they were calling for an end to gender-based violence and femicide.

== #NiUnaMenos online movement origin and impact ==
=== March 2015 ===
After the murder of nineteen-year-old woman Diana Garcia, a couple of Argentinian journalists and writers organized a reading marathon. Vanina Escales was one of those journalists and activists that participated in the organization of the event. For the name of the event, Escales was inspired by Susana Chavez's phrase "Ni una Menos, Ni una Muerte Más" which means 'Not One Woman Less, Not One More Woman Killed' which Chavez used to protest the femicides that were occurring in Ciudad Juarez, Mexico. "Ni Una Menos" became the slogan to promote the event on Facebook as Escales wanted to bring immediate attention to the alarming increase of femicides. The event took place 26 March of 2015 in Buenos Aires' national library where artists and families touched by the tragedies attended the event. The event's goal was to shed light on the number of femicides in Argentina through a series of literary performances.

=== May 2015 ===
In the month of May, 14-year-old girl Chiara Paez was murdered by her boyfriend and his mother, and buried under their house. Argentinian radio journalist Marcela Ojeda who had covered femicide cases,was horrified upon learning about Paez's murder, so she went on Twitter's platform to denounce the alarming increase of femicides in Argentina. She wrote:

“Actrices, políticas, artistas, empresarias, referentes sociales...mujeres, todas, bah...no vamos a levantar la voz? NOS ESTAN MATANDO”

English translation:

“Women actors, politicians, artists, entrepreneurs, social activists . . . all women, are we not going to raise our voice? They are killing us.”

After Ojeda's Tweet Argentinian activists, artists, media personalities and even lawyers got involved through social media some them were; Florencia Etcheves, Florencia Abbate, Valeria Sampedro, Ingrid Beck, Hinde Pomeraniec, Claudia Piñero and Cecilia Palmeiro. Two groups were formed, one of them created the Ni Una Menos Twitter account and the other group managed the previously existing Facebook account. They created the hashtag #NiUnaMenos, where they encouraged people to share pictures including the hashtag. Many images were shared amongst users that informed the public on violence against women and images that tried to dismatle misogynistic behaviours in Argentinian society. Among those pictures, a drawing of a "little girl with a closed fist" came to represent the movement at the time.

Social media was a big part of the movement, the hashtag was used to protest different political and social issues that women were being victims of in Argentina. Their main concerns being the government not properly giving justice to violence victims, abortion rights and the gender pay gap. Many women were even using the hashtag to share their own stories. The movement gave women a platform to share what they went through such as Mariana Madiana, a woman who went through 59 surgeries because her husband had burnt her. She shared that: "With Ni Una Menos, women are no longer hiding,’... ‘Before, we would not talk,". Through these kinds of engagements with the hashtag, the movement increased awareness on violence against women. The media attention that the online movement generated was what made possible the organization of a march for justice on 3 June 2015.

=== June 2015 ===
This two groups of women who organized the #NiUnaMenos movement merged into one, comprising a total of 20 members. They worked together to plan a march on 3 June of 2015 to collectively denounce the femicides in Argentina and demand justice for the victims. Both the hashtag and the march were a huge success, the virality of the hashtag was so big that protests took place in 70 cities across Argentina. 200,000 people attended the march in Buenos Aires and 61.2% of the attendees were there because of social media. #NiUnaMenos became a slogan to fight violence against women as thousands of people showed up to the strike using this phrase. The online engagement with the hashtag kept ongoing as the march was taking place, #NiUnaMenos was mentioned 516,000 times that day. Between Ojeda's first tweet and the march, the hashtag was tweeted about 958,000.

=== Impact ===
#NiUnaMenos created a community which increased online engagement as anyone was able to participate in the movement. Research shows how the hashtag was key to the success of the movement as it increased the movements abilities to "raise awareness, mobilize support and even pressure policymakers to address the problem of femicide in Argentina." #NiUnaMenos became a tool to demand legal consequences for those who committed crimes against women and for them to be held accountable by the state. Furthermore, #NiUnaMenos is argued by some historians to have led to a judicial transformation in legal texts more than in courtrooms. Margarita Saona points out the introduction of specific gender violence training for judges, while Romina Accossatto and Mariana Sendra argue that lawmakers turned an attentive eye to the movement and subsequent marches.

Because of the amount of involvement that the protests received, Argentina's Supreme Court and government took immediate action and started collecting data about gender based violence and approved a law that protects women from verbal and physical abuse. The online movement even had a huge impact on activism numbers in Argentina, between 2014 and 2017. Women's involvement in manifestations went from 8% to 16% as a result of the social media movement.

The hashtag not only allowed people from outside Buenos Aires to join the movement but it allowed people from other countries to partake in it as well. This led to the hashtag to not only go viral in Argentina but in other South American countries too. It now holds a record within Latin America most popular hashtags. Because of this, #NiUnaMenos also impacted and increased discussions and campaigns about reproductive rights in Argentina and in other Latin American countries.

== The Impact of the Ni Una Menos Movement Within Other Movements ==
=== The Green Tide ===
While the Ni Una Menos movement is broader and extensive, this movement has inspired and has been incorporated or infused within other movements. This is seen in the Green Tide movement. The Green Tide movement refers to the movement in Latin America that fights for reproductive justice such as the legalization of abortion, which is heavily promoted through the usage of green bandanas or green scarves. The green bandanas were originally a symbol that represented the right to legalized abortions used by the National Campaign for Legal, Safe, and Free Abortion. This campaign is a campaign from Argentina that presented a bill in 2003, calling for the legalization of abortion, however, they had no luck in passing it. While the symbol and representation behind the green scarf were first started by the National Campaign for Legal, Safe, and Free Abortion, the Ni Una Menos movement is what popularized it and spread the symbol across Latin America. Many Ni Una Menos protests and demonstrations in Latin America are accompanied by green bandanas/ scarves. Along with these green pañuelos or bandanas, were many chants, such as the chant "Las ricas abortan, las pobres mueren", meaning the rich women abort, while the poor women die, highlighting the injustices and disproportionate inequalities that affect poor women due to the inaccessibility to a legal abortion. Although the Ni Una Menos movement's prime objective is to fight against femicide and domestic abuse, general women's rights such as the right to an abortion were heavily integrated into the movement. With many Ni Una Menos protests accompanied by the green scarves and the green movement, on 30 December 2020, abortion of up to 14 weeks of pregnancy was legalized in Argentina, the heart and origin of the movement. The presence of the Green Tide due to the Ni Una Menos movement was seen in many Latin American countries, such as Mexico, and as a result, curated law changes in favor of the movement's ideals. In September 2021, the Mexican Supreme Court declared that abortions would no longer be criminalized. Furthermore, every year on 28 September, International Safe Abortion Day, and 8 March, International Women's Day, cities across Latin America become visually green, as they are filled with green pañuelos and green bandana demonstrations, showing the impact of the green tide that was preached by the Ni Una Menos movement.

== Ni Una Menos: Public Health Framing of Abortion ==
Ni Una Menos, while widely recognized for its mobilization against gender-based violence, also contributed to re-framing abortion as a public health and social justice issue in Argentina and across Latin America. Rather than treating abortion solely as a matter of individual morality, this movement emphasized how restrictive abortion laws disproportionately affect people with lower socioeconomic status, who are more likely to resort to unsafe procedures.This framing aligned the movement with public health and feminist who argue that debates around abortion should not be limited to questions of fetal viability or moral doctrine, but should instead consider the structural inequalities that shape access to reproductive care.In contexts where abortion is criminalized, activists highlight that public health systems often fail to provide safe services, reinforcing stigma and leaving the most vulnerable at risk of preventable complications or death.

By centering these inequities, Ni Una Menos helped shift regional discussions toward understanding unsafe abortion as a systemic and preventable public health concern. This approach also generated comparisons with countries where abortion is formally legal but access remains stratified by class, such as the United States, continuing to raise questions about how economic inequality continues to affect who is able to obtain safe reproductive care.

=== Justicia para Nuestras Hijas ===
Another movement that incorporates Ni Una Menos values is the organization, Justicia para Nuestras Hijas, or Justice for Our Daughters. Justicia para Nuestras Hijas is an activist group that advocates for the rights and justice of femicide victims in Chihuahua, Mexico. This group is made up of family members and activists who seek justice for their daughters and want an end to femicide in Mexico. Due to the lack of proper investigation and government negligence, this organization conducts its own investigations to acquire justice for femicide victims or missing women. When there are public demonstrations or protests on the streets by this group, they carry a pink cross as their symbol. On this pink cross is the phrase "Ni Una Menos". This group carries on the message and incorporates the values of the Ni Unas Menos movement as the movement fights against femicide.

== Diversity ==
The Ni Una Menos has been a welcoming movement that has created a safe space for people of many different intersectionalities. The movement's diversity encourages younger generations to join the movement regardless of their backgrounds and identities. The movement's diversity also plays into part in why it has been successful and why it has been so widespread across Latin America. The inclusion and welcoming of Black, indigenous, trans, and queer women has allowed the movement to gain a lot of support and followers. The movement is not limited to one identity or one certain woman but instead accounts for many women and the many intersectionalities that encompass Latin America. While other movements such as the #MeToo movement are critiqued by feminist scholars, such as Angela Davis, for the lack of inclusion and taking into account structural issues such as race, the Ni Una Menos movement acknowledges structural issues such as race and gender in society. By using intersectional feminism, the Ni Una Menos movement is able to address issues affecting women with a broader perspective and can connect issues such as femicide to other gender and racial issues prevalent in society.

== The Queer Community ==
While it is not exactly clear where the Ni Una Menos collective stands with queer rights, queer issues, and other related issues, the Ni Una Menos is known to be an intersectional and welcoming movement where the LGBTQ+ community is embraced and active in Ni Una Menos demonstrations, aligning themselves with an LGBTQ+ rights agenda. For example, in 2018, the Ni Una Menos movement organized a global stance against patriarchy that was called the "Orgasmarathon". This event was an international and global orgasm that intended to include and preach for the necessities and aspirations of feminists and the LGBTQ+ community. This event was spread on social media to reach international participation, where women from wherever they were located, were encouraged to engage in self-pleasure and be a part of what was explained to be a "sexual revolution" by the Ni Una Menos collective, whilst embracing different sexualities and identities within the broader Ni Una Menos movement. This event occurred on the same day as the 2018 International Women's Strike, on 8 March at midnight.

== Beyond Latin America ==
=== United States ===
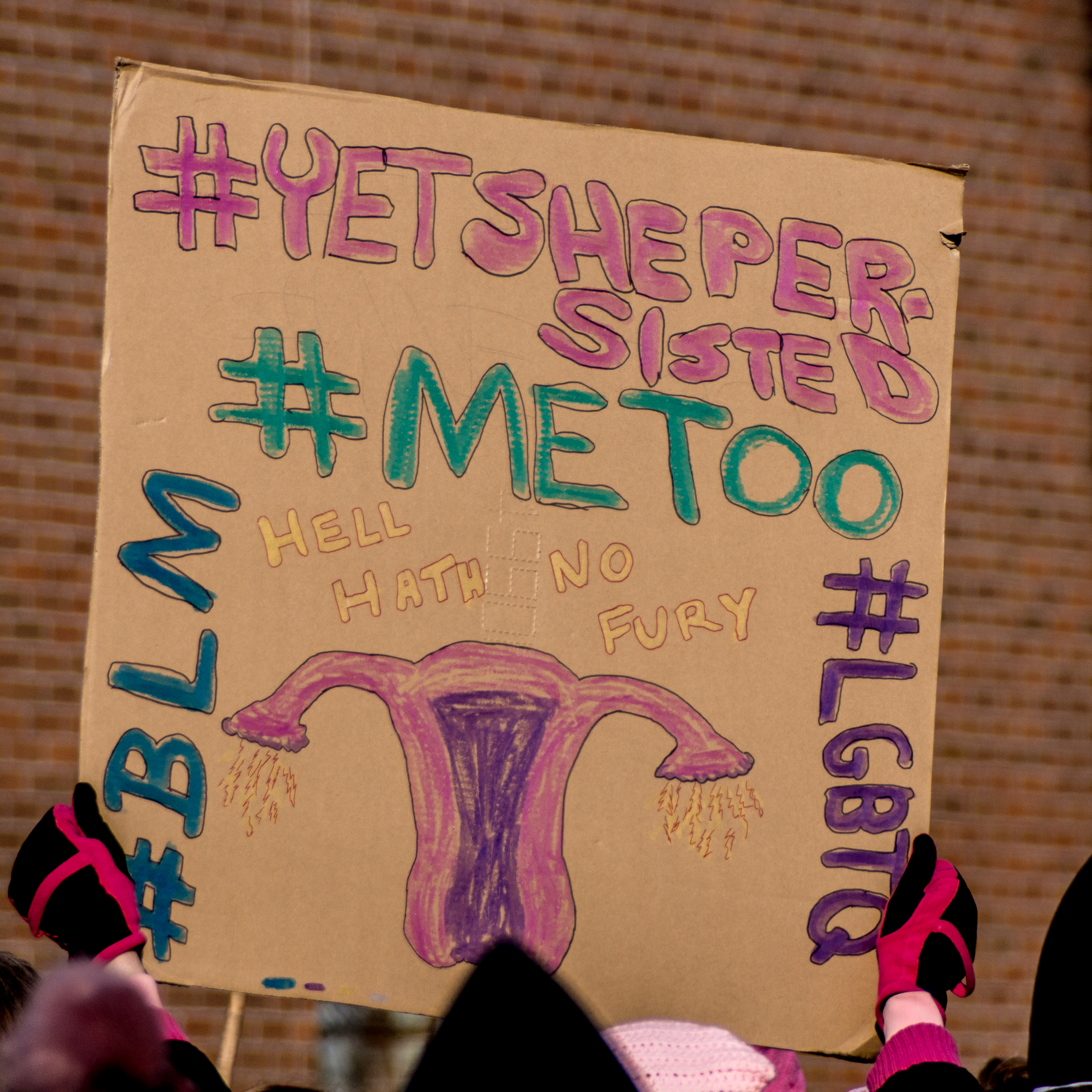
#MeToo sign at the 2018 Women's March in New York

The Ni Una Menos movement expressed itself as the large scale #MeToo Movement in the United States. Their missions are somewhat different since MeToo focuses on calling out perpetrators of sexual assault and harassment in positions of power, while Ni Una Menos pays more attention to femicide specifically. They share themes of improving the situation of violence against women and secured much of their support from social media. Moreover, #MeToo has collaborated with Ni Una Menos as they did for the International Women's Strike in 2017. They have also pointed to Ni Una Menos as an inspiration to their activism. The #MeToo Movement began in 2017, a couple of years after the first protest in Argentina and the movement had begun to spread throughout the rest of South America and the Caribbean. It was a reaction to Harvey Weinstein's continued inappropriate sexual behavior. Several actresses, including Alyssa Milano, took to social media to denounce Weinstein. They also encouraged other women to share experiences within the same industry with other perpetrators. This initiative expanded to other industries and people in power within them. The purpose of the movement was for women to find solidarity, support, and a safe space to share their stories of sexual assault and harassment. The phrase "Me Too" was originally coined by Tarana Burke in 2007 to encourage survivors to speak out. However, it became more mainstream once it reached social media in 2017.

== Reproductive Justice in the U.S. ==
Analysis of Ni Una Menos have also informed comparative discussions about reproductive justice in the United States, particularly regarding how race and socioeconomic inequality shape access to abortion and other forms of reproductive health care. During the 1970s, federal policy barriers such as the Hyde Amendment restricted the use of Medicaid funds for abortion except in limited circumstances, significantly limiting access for low-income communities and disproportionately affecting women of color.Insurance restrictions and high out-of-pocket costs have continued to make abortion more accessible to individuals with financial stability while limiting access for those living in or near poverty.

Following the 2022 Dobbs v. Jackson Women’s Health Organization decision, which overturned federal constitutions protections for abortion, numerous U.S. states enacted bans or severe restrictions.These policies have been linked to an increase in self-managed abortions, including unsafe methods among individuals unable to afford clinical care.

Viewed through the public health framework emphasized by Ni Una Menos, these developments illustrate how abortion restrictions can deepen existing inequalities and expose marginalized communities to preventable health risks. This perspective demonstrates the movement’s broader argument that abortion access is not just a women’s right issue but a critical matter of public health and social justice.

== Criticism and Backlash ==
The basis of the Ni Una Menos movement is that women face disproportionate violence due to their gender. Some critics counter this assertion with the fact that in aggregate men face more violence than women. Some respond to this by reframing feminicide as an effect of a patriarchal society that has negative consequences for everybody that lives within it. Meanwhile, others simply reject the movement.

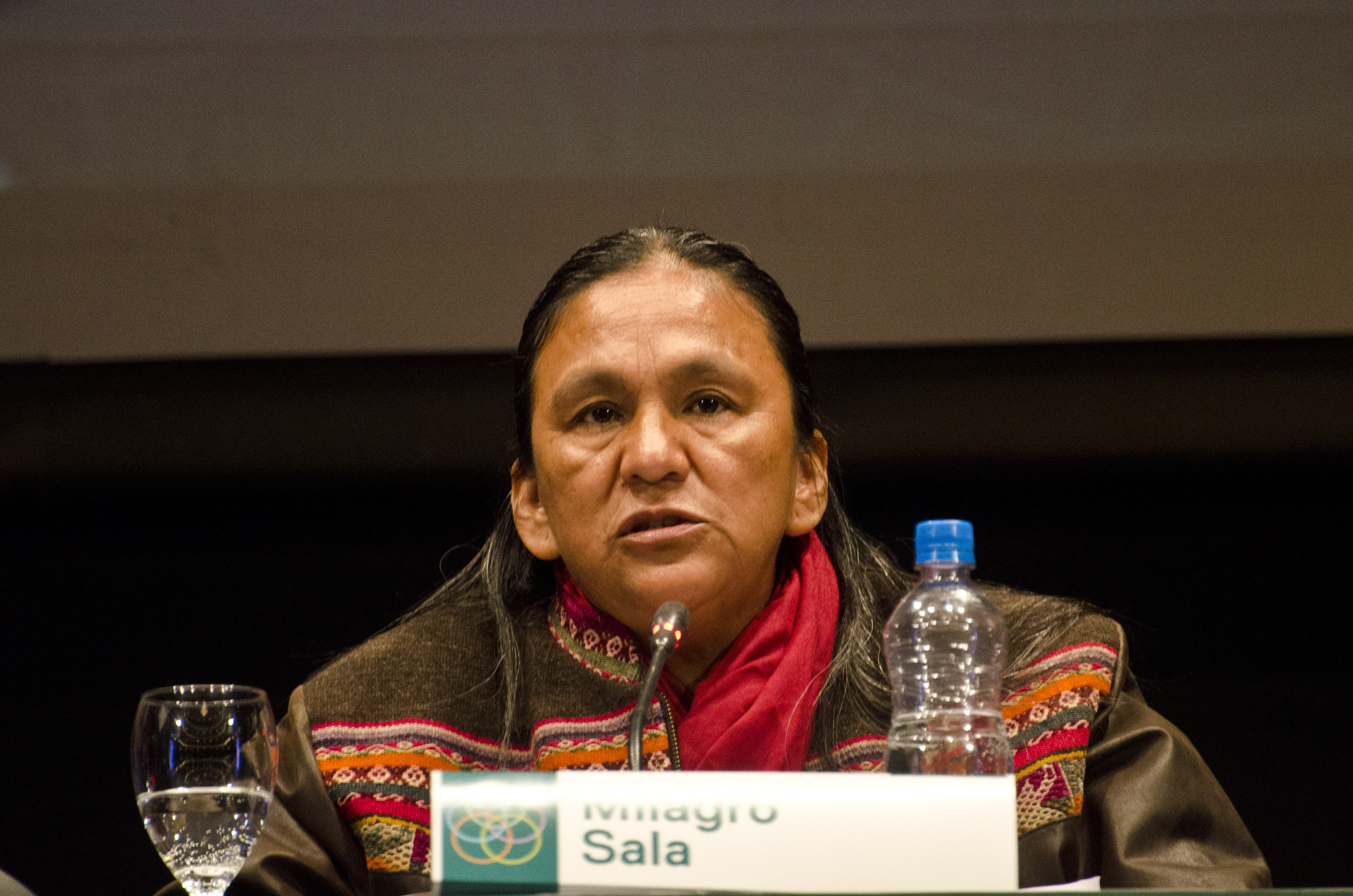
Milagro Sala, a figure in Argentine social and political spheres.

On the other hand, Ni Una Menos strategically establishes itself as a movement against gender based violence. While many members of the movement champion for other aspects of women's liberation, such as abortion rights and LGBTQ+ rights, the movement has not adopted an official position for either of these. However, there still are strong indicators that the rise of the Ni Una Menos movement facilitated the abortion legalization process in Argentina. Conservative and religious sectors across Latin America have opposed the overlap between people that support the Ni Una Menos movement and these other rights.

The movement has been criticized by some journalists, especially since 2017, for some of its demands, such as the freedom of Milagro Sala in Argentina.

== See also ==
- 2017 Women's March
- Ele Não movement (Brazil, 2018)
- Feminism in Latin America
- Feminism in Argentina
- Feminism in Chile
- Feminism in Mexico
- Women in Argentina
- Women in Chile
- Women in Paraguay
- Women in Peru
- Women in Uruguay
- Gender inequality in Bolivia
- LGBT rights in Argentina
- List of protests in the 21st century
- 2025 livestreamed murder in Argentina
