= Femicide in Peru =

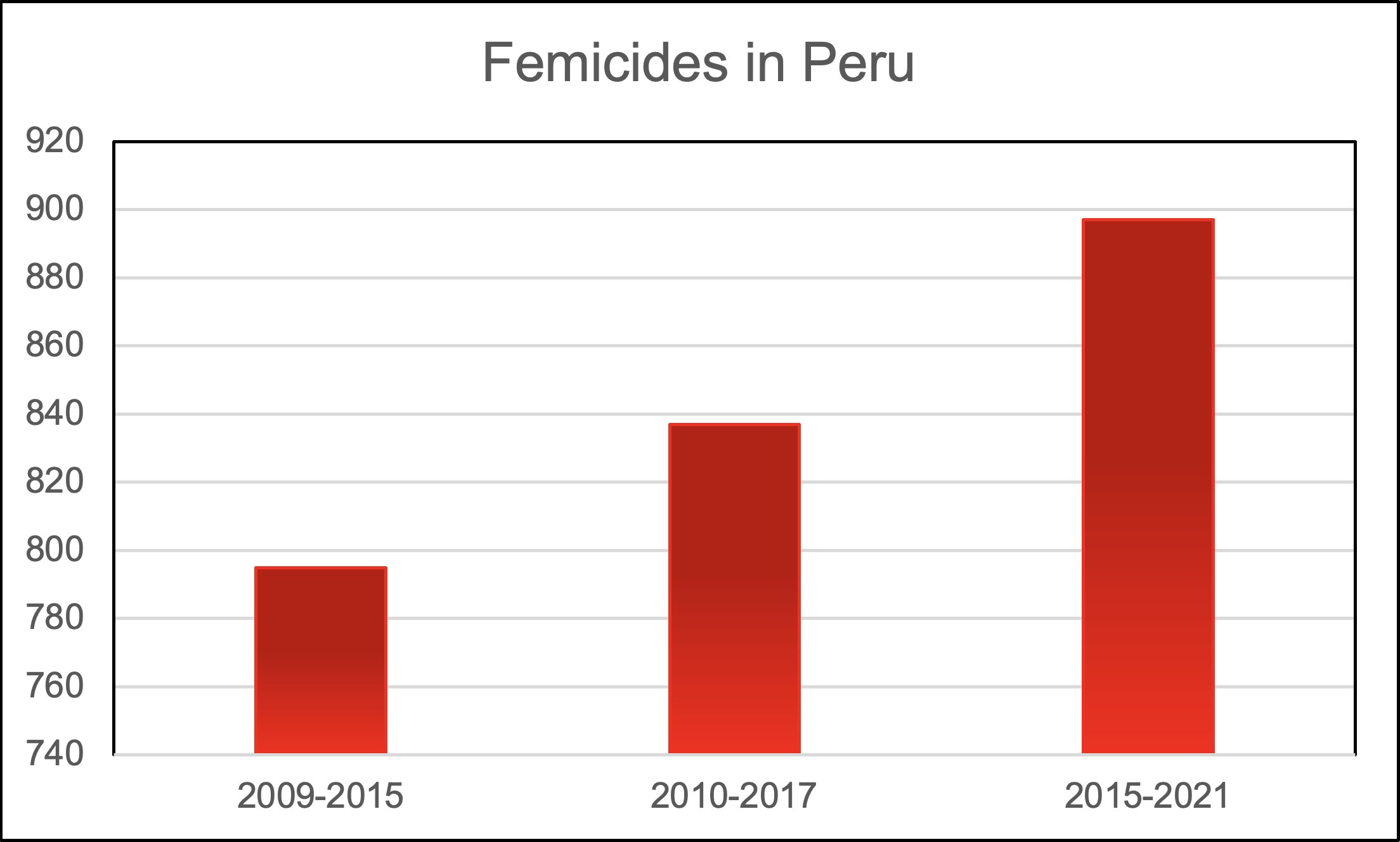

Femicides in Peru are murders committed against women in Peru, a country in South America, which experiences high levels of violence against women. Between 2010 and 2017, 837 women were murdered and 1,172 murder attempts were made. Updated numbers between 2015 and 2021 showed and increase in femicides, with 897 women being killed in Peru during the period.

== Statistics ==
According to a survey by the country's National Statistics Institute, 32.3% of Peruvian women stated they had experienced physical violence from a partner at some point, with 11.9% experiencing it within the previous 12 months.

In 2016 Eduardo Vega, the country's human rights ombudsman, reported that on average, ten women per month were murdered by their partners. A study by the ombudman's office found that between 2009 and 2015, 795 femicides had been committed, but with only 84 criminal sentences being passed between 2012 and 2015; in 81% of cases of attempted femicide, it was found no measures had been taken by authorities to protect the victims, 24% of whom were subsequently murdered by their partners.

Trends in femicide have increased in recent years; in 2017 there were 94 femicides, while in 2020, 138 femicides were reported. That same year, a newly created registry of disappeared people listed 5521 women, equating to two-thirds of missing people in Peru. In 2020, only two sentences were passed pertaining to femicide.

A 2018 study of intimate femicides by the University of Lima identified two main risk factors increasing the likelihood of femicide increasing: past psychological violence, and premeditated violence. The same study estimated the years of life lost due to premature mortality caused by femicides at 16, 567 between 2011 and 2015.

== Movement against violence towards women ==
In 2016, the organisation NiUnaMenos (Spanish: Not one less) was created, protesting against femicides and violence against women in Peru.

In 2020, protests began in Peru over the deaths of Judith Machaca and Noemí Escobar, two women whose bodies were found in a well; a public outcry followed when Santiago Pace, a police officer who confessed to murdering both women and being a member of a sex trafficking ring operating from within the Peruvian police, was released from custody by a local judge.

== See also ==
- Gender-based violence in Peru
- NiUnaMenos (Peru) — A Peruvian movement against violence towards women
