= Central General de Trabajadores =

Central General de Trabajadores ('General Workers Central') may refer to:

- Central General de Trabajadores (Dominican Republic)
- Central General de Trabajadores (Honduras)
