= Nora Cortiñas =

Argentine human rights activist (1930–2024)

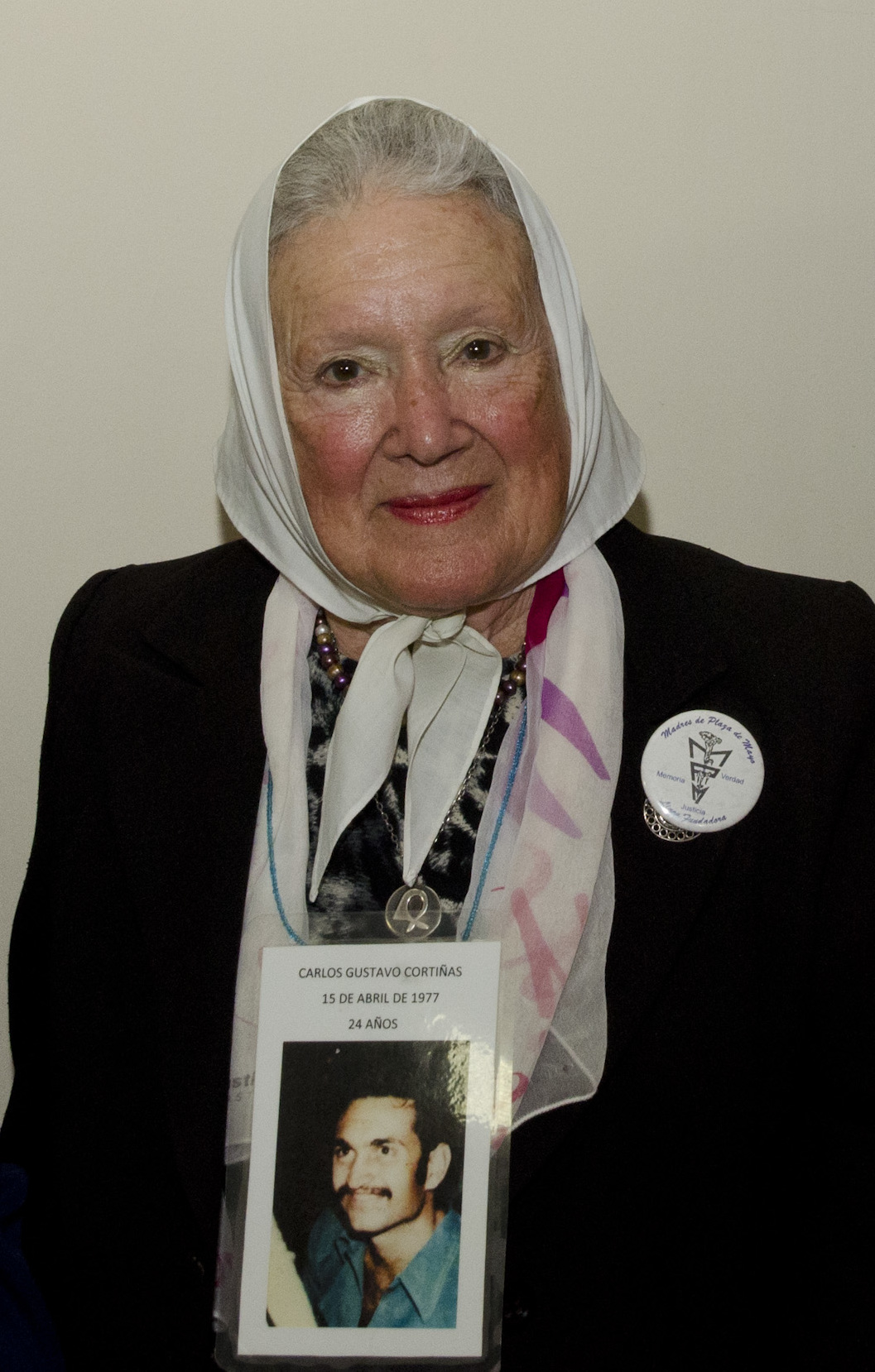
- Cortiñas in 2014
- Born: Nora Irma Morales; 22 March 1930; Buenos Aires, Argentina
- Died: 30 May 2024 (aged 94); Buenos Aires, Argentina
- Occupation: Human rights activist
- Organization(s): CGT, Madres de Plaza de Mayo Línea Fundadora
- Spouse: Carlos Cortiñas (m. 1950, ?)
- Children: 2

Nora Irma Morales de Cortiñas (born Nora Irma Morales; 22 March 1930 – 30 May 2024), better known as Nora "Norita" Cortiñas, was an Argentine social psychologist and human rights activist. She was a co-founder of Mothers of Plaza de Mayo and later of Madres de Plaza de Mayo Línea Fundadora.

== Career ==
Cortiñas was a social psychologist and professor at the Faculty of Economic Sciences at the University of Buenos Aires. From 1998, she held the chair of "Economic Power and Human Rights".

Her son Gustavo Cortiñas was a member of the Justicialist Party and the Montoneros organization in the Villa 31 neighborhood of Buenos Aires. He was arrested and disappeared in Castelar, Buenos Aires Province, on 15 April 1977, when he was working in the Ministry of Economy after having previously passed through the National Institute of Statistics and Census of Argentina and the National Securities Commission, by members of the Armed Forces.

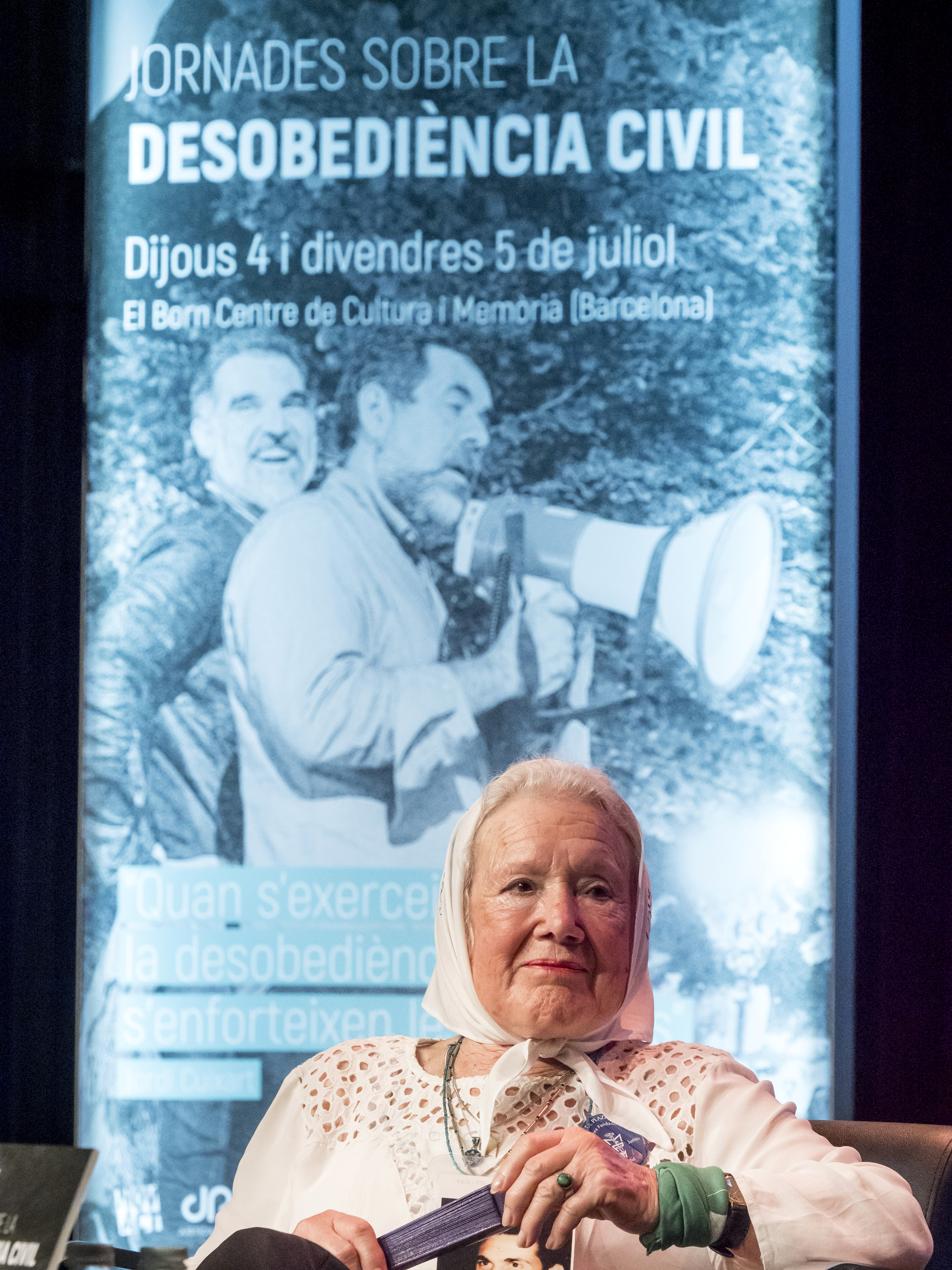
Cortiñas at the Jornades sobre Desobediència Civil (Conference on Civil Disobedience) in Barcelona, Spain, in 2019

From 1977, Cortiñas was part of the Madres de Plaza de Mayo Línea Fundadora, who demand that the authorities punish those guilty of the kidnappings, torture and forced disappearances of approximately 30,000 people during the military dictatorship from 1976 to 1983. She travelled through all continents calling for solidarity with the families of the disappeared and the punishment of those guilty of crimes against humanity in their country. As a university professor, she carried out analyses and studies on the relationship between the military dictatorship, foreign debt and the economic crisis in Argentina.

Cortiñas showed her support for the cause of legal abortion, being a speaker at the Ni una menos march on 4 June 2018, in favor of it.

Cortiñas died on 30 May 2024 in Buenos Aires, at the age of 94.

== Awards and honours ==
- 2000, Doctor Honoris Causa, Université libre de Bruxelles, Belgium
- 2004, Doctor Honoris Causa, National University of Salta
- 2012, Doctor Honoris Causa, University of Buenos Aires
- 2019, Doctor Honoris Causa, National University of Entre Ríos
- 2019, Human Rights Award from the Spanish Association for Human Rights, shared with Victoire Ingabire Umuhoza
