= General Confederation of Labour =

General Confederation of Labour can mean one of the following labor unions:

- Italian General Confederation of Labour (CGIL)
- General Confederation of Workers (Chile)
- Central General de Trabajadores (Dominican Republic), a trade union in the Dominican Republic
- Central General de Trabajadores (Honduras), a trade union in Honduras
- General Confederation of Labour of Luxembourg, a trade union federation in Luxembourg
- General Confederation of Workers (Mexico) (Confederación General de Trabajadores), a Mexican trade union
- General Confederation of Workers (Puerto Rico) (CGT)
- General Confederation of Labour (Spain), (CGT) a Spanish anarchosyndicalist trade union
- General Confederation of Labour (France), (CGT) one of the largest French confederations of trade unions
- General Confederation of Labour (Belgium) (CGT)
- General Labour Confederation of Belgium (CGTB)
- General Confederation of Labour (Argentina), the largest labor federation in Argentina
- Confederação Geral dos Trabalhadores, a Brazilian trade union
- General Confederation of Labour (Portugal), a Portuguese trade union
- Vietnam General Confederation of Labour, a Vietnamese trade union
