= CGT =

CGT can refer to:

- Canada's Got Talent
- General Confederation of Labour, various labour unions, initials in Latin-based languages
  - General Confederation of Labour (France)
- California Guitar Trio
- Capital gains tax
- Combinatorial game theory
- Compagnie générale transaérienne, a French airline (1909–21)
- Compagnie Générale Transatlantique, or French Line
- Compagnie générale transsaharienne, Saharan transport company
- Compensated gross tonnage
- Porsche Carrera GT
