= Susana Chávez =

Mexican poet and human rights activist (1974–2011)

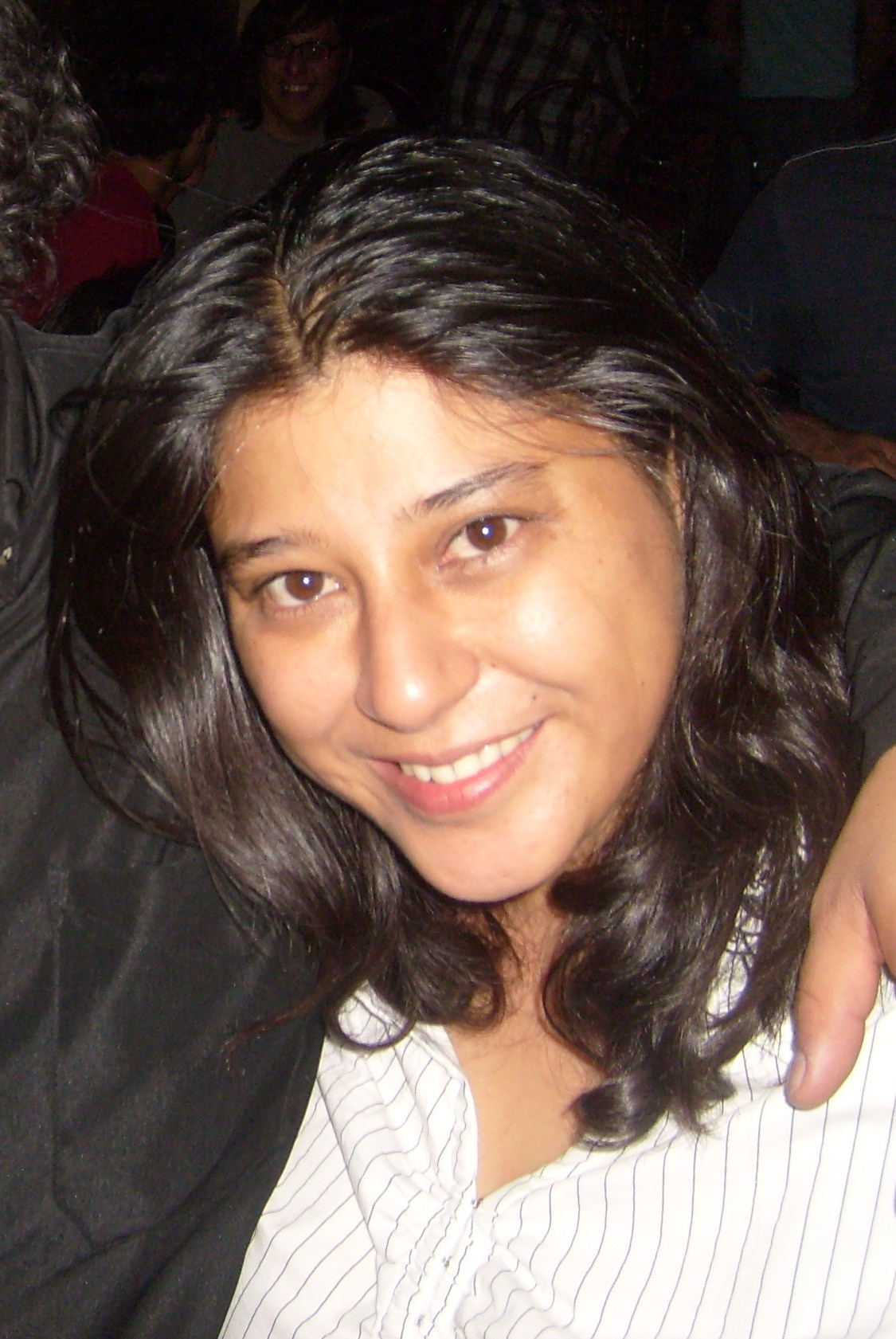
- Chávez Castillo in 2008
- Born: November 5, 1974
- Died: c. January 6, 2011 (aged 36); Ciudad Juárez, Chihuahua, Mexico
- Education: Universidad Autónoma de Ciudad Juárez

Susana Chávez Castillo (November 5, 1974 – c. January 6, 2011) was a Mexican poet and human rights activist who was born and lived most of her life in her hometown of Ciudad Juárez.

She is credited with the authorship of the phrase "Not one more" (Spanish: Ni una muerta más), which was used by the civil rights organizations and their supporters struggling to address the plight of women in Juárez and to end a wave of killings aimed specifically at women since 1993.

On January 6, 2011, Chávez was found murdered and mutilated in the "Colonia Cuauhtémoc" section of the city of Juárez where she was born and lived most of her life. Her family positively identified the remains on January 10, 2011, and this information was released the following day. She was 36 years old.

== Life and work ==
Susana Chávez began her foray into the poetry scene when she was aged eleven. She consistently participated in various literary festivals both in Ciudad Juárez and in other cultural forums throughout Mexico. According to Chávez's blog profile, she received a degree in psychology from the Universidad Autónoma de Ciudad Juárez (UACJ) and was working on a book of poems.

== Death ==
Chávez was strangled in her hometown of Ciudad Juárez, most likely on January 6, 2011. According to a statement released by Chávez's mother, her daughter was going to visit some friends but did not reach her destination. On the morning of January 6, 2011, her body and severed hand were found. Her head was covered with a black bag. On January 10, Chávez's family identified the body, but this information was not released until the next day after it was announced that three individuals were detained for their alleged involvement in the murder.

The state attorney general of Chihuahua, Carlos Manuel Salas, said that the murder of Chávez was not related to her role as an activist. According to Salas, Chávez had inadvertently met up with a group of youths who had gone out "to have fun", and this involved drugs and alcohol.

Human rights organizations argued that Salas was victim blaming Chávez for her own murder. Norma Ledezma, organization coordinator for Justice for our Daughters, said that the death of Susana Chavez is part of the attitude of exemption that lives in Juárez. On the same note, the founder of the organization May Our Daughters Return Home, Marisela Ortiz, denounced the culture of intolerance and impunity as perpetuating the idea that anyone can commit a crime. Amnesty International then demanded swift, apparent action be taken.

Gustavo de la Rosa, an official from the State Human Rights Commission of Chihuahua, showed his concern for the recent events by emphasizing that the majority of people in Juárez think that there is no delinquency, only organized crime. Nevertheless, he maintains his stance that he, along with others, are living in a state of criminal anarchy in which the lumpen (urban social group) dominate the areas that the government cannot control. Incidentally, the three detained minors belong to a socially marginalized group whom Susana was accustomed to working with in her humanitarian efforts.

After the arrest of the young men, it became known that they were a part of the gang Los Aztecas and had been under the influence of drugs and alcohol. Their confession of membership in Los Aztecas had started an intense disagreement; Susana then threatened to turn them into the police and they killed her.

In 2013 Chavez's three murderers were given the maximum penalty of fifteen years in prison by a specialized court for juvenile offenders.

== Legacy ==
In the summer of 2016, a demonstration for women's rights took place in Peru called "NiUnaMenos"; although ignited by the treatment of Arlette Contreras, it was called "#NiUnaMenos" in reference to the life and death of Susana Chávez.

== See also ==
- Female homicides in Ciudad Juárez
- Marisela Escobedo Ortiz (in Spanish)
- Chihuahuan (in Spanish)
