= 2018 Lima fire attack =

2018 incident in Miraflores, Peru

Lima fire attack
- 2018 Lima fire attack (Lima) Location of the fire attack
- Location: 35°37′19.8″N 139°33′57.7″E; Miraflores, Lima, Peru
- Date: 24 April 2018
- Attack type: Arson
- Weapon: Gasoline
- Deaths: 1
- Injuries: 10 (including the perpetrator)
- Perpetrator: Carlos Hualpa Vacas

On 24 April 2018, 11 passengers were burnt in an arson attack on a bus in the district of Miraflores, in Lima, Peru. One of the victims, 22-year old Eyvi Ágreda, who was the target of the attack, died more than a month later in the hospital. The attacker was identified as Carlos Hualpa Vacas, who belonged to the victim's work environment.

== Attack ==
It was around seven o'clock on the night of 24 April 2018, and the suspect, consisting of a man who was covered with a hood and dark glasses, went on the bus and sat on the back of the vehicle. He then got up and moved forward three seats to douse a woman, who was also sitting on the bus, with gasoline. After that, she was set on fire. The fire also reached at least 10 other passengers. The suspect escaped the scene with minor burns on his arm.

== Investigation ==
The testimonies of the witnesses, the recordings of the security cameras, as well as a clue given by the sister of the mortal victim, helped to find the author of this fact.

Hualpa Vacas was absent from his job the day after the attack because his arm was burnt. This coincides with the version of the bus driver, who said that the author of the attack fled the burning bus with his limb on fire, a crucial detail.

The bus driver also said that Hualpa Vacas had his head covered with a green hood and dark glasses, while other witnesses added that he was carrying a black backpack. The security cameras on the bus captured the person with these characteristics.

The victim's sister had received a warning message just before the attack. She had asked him to wait for her at the bus station, because she was afraid of a man named Javier who was chasing her. However, this has not been confirmed whether “Javier” was chasing Eyvi Ágreda, or if a man named Javier lived throughout the area where the bus arson happened.

The police went to the workplace of Hualpa Vacas, which he had to enter at 9:00 a.m, but when they knew he was on leave because he had suffered an accident the night before, they reinforced his hypothesis.

When Hualpa Vacas peeked out at the door of his house, he was intervened and immediately reduced, and it was confirmed that he had burn marks on his left hand and forearm, as reported by the driver of the bus in which the attack occurred.

In his testimony to the Police, Hualpa revealed the plan in detail, according to the policemen who questioned him without showing any remorse.

Hualpa Vacas said that he wanted to justify his actions and pointed out that he did not want to kill Eyvi Ágreda as if he would not do something “just to disfigure her”, and that he had planned the attack a long time ago, so a month earlier he bought the gasoline from a gas station, stored the fuel in a plastic bottle, and hid it away, possibly at his house, before concealing the gasoline-filled bottle inside his backpack, taking it to the bus station to catch the same bus that he and Eyvi Ágreda boarded on, using that bottle’s fuel to burn her alive.

One of the versions that he formulated is that he had injured himself while cooking in his house, but he also said that he burnt himself because he was very nervous when he realized that his name was given as a suspect. One of the policemen explained that nobody had mentioned it with certainty and had only given his second name.

The truth is that he could not say where he was treated for the burns he had, which was bandaged after the application of a substance, probably to relieve pain.

This case received extensive media coverage, both for the number of victims of this attack and for the way in which Eyvi was attacked. This was a representative case of the high numbers of murders of women registered in Peru.

== Reactions ==
- César Villanueva, president of Ministers Council, tweeted: "The National Police is in full investigation of the facts to find the person responsible for this attack, we are going to incorporate the most drastic measures to solve this problem, which is so unacceptable, that it is acts of violence against women". In addition, he assured that the Ministry of the Interior had deployed the necessary work teams to capture the person responsible for this crime.
- The Ombudsman Office highlighted "the need to approve a criminal type that sanctions the different manifestations of harassment that allows effective protection to victims."
- Fiorella Molinelli, president of Essalud, visited the victim at the hospital on 25 April. In statements to journalists, he condemned the attack: "The whole weight of the law must fall on this man who has attempted against the lives of many people," she said.
- Ana María Mendieta, Minister of Woman and Vulnerable Populations, affirmed that only prevention will make it possible to reduce cases of femicide in the country. He also appealed to "exemplary sanctions" applied by the judicial authorities to the aggressors, according to Andina state news agency.

== See also ==
- NiUnaMenos (Peru)
