= Gross tonnage =

Nonlinear measure of a ship's overall internal volume

Gross tonnage is calculated by measuring a ship's volume (from keel to funnel, to the outside of the hull framing) and applying a mathematical formula.

Gross tonnage (GT, G.T. or gt) is a nonlinear measure of a ship's overall internal volume. Gross tonnage is different from gross register tonnage. Neither gross tonnage nor gross register tonnage should be confused with measures of mass or weight such as deadweight tonnage or displacement.

Gross tonnage, along with net tonnage, was defined by the International Convention on Tonnage Measurement of Ships, 1969, adopted by the International Maritime Organization (IMO) in 1969, and came into force on 18 July 1982. These two measurements replaced gross register tonnage (GRT) and net register tonnage (NRT). Gross tonnage is calculated based on "the moulded volume of all enclosed spaces of the ship" and is used to determine things such as a ship's manning regulations, safety rules, registration fees, and port dues, whereas the older gross register tonnage is a measure of the volume of only certain enclosed spaces.

== History ==
The International Convention on Tonnage Measurement of Ships, 1969 was adopted by IMO in 1969. The Convention mandated a transition from the former measurements of gross register tonnage (grt) and net register tonnage (nrt) to gross tonnage (GT) and net tonnage (NT). It was the first successful attempt to introduce a universal tonnage measurement system.

Various methods were previously used to calculate merchant ship tonnage, but they differed significantly and one single international system was needed. Previous methods traced back to George Moorsom of Great Britain's Board of Trade who devised one such method in 1854.

The tonnage determination rules apply to all ships built on or after 18 July 1982. Ships built before that date were given 12 years to migrate from their existing gross register tonnage (GRT) to use of GT and NT. The phase-in period was provided to allow ships time to adjust economically, since tonnage is the basis for satisfying manning regulations and safety rules. Tonnage is also the basis for calculating registration fees and port dues. One of the convention's goals was to ensure that the new calculated tonnages "did not differ too greatly" from the traditional gross and net register tonnages.

Both GT and NT are obtained by measuring ship's volume and then applying a mathematical formula. Gross tonnage is based on "the moulded volume of all enclosed spaces of the ship" whereas net tonnage is based on "the moulded volume of all cargo spaces of the ship". In addition, a ship's net tonnage is constrained to be no less than 30% of her gross tonnage.

== Calculation ==
The gross tonnage calculation is defined in Regulation 3 of Annex 1 of The International Convention on Tonnage Measurement of Ships, 1969. It is based on two variables and is ultimately an increasing one-to-one function of ship volume:

- V, the ship's total volume in cubic metres (m^{3}), and
- K, a multiplier based on the ship volume.

The value of the multiplier K increases logarithmically with the ship's total volume (in cubic metres) and is applied as an amplification factor in determining the gross tonnage value. K is calculated with a formula that uses the common or base-10 logarithm:

$$K = 0.2 + 0.02 \times \log_{10}(V)\,$$

Once V and K are known, gross tonnage is calculated using the formula, whereby GT is a function of V:

$$GT = V \times K\,$$

which by substitution is:

$$GT = V\times(0.2 + 0.02\times\log_{10}(V))$$

Thus, gross tonnage exhibits linearithmic growth with volume, increasing faster at larger volumes. The units of gross tonnage, which involve both cubic metres and log-metres, have no physical significance but were chosen for historical convenience.

=== Volume from gross tonnage ===
Since gross tonnage is a bijective function of ship volume, it has an inverse function, namely ship volume from gross tonnage, but the inverse cannot be expressed in terms of elementary functions. A root-finding algorithm may be used for obtaining an approximation to a ship's volume given its gross tonnage. The formula for exact conversion of gross tonnage to volume is:

$$V = \frac{50 \times \ln 10 \times GT}{W(5 \times 10^{11} \times \ln 10 \times GT)}$$

where $\ln$ is the natural logarithm and $W$ is the Lambert W function.

Gross tonnage	Volume (m^{3})	Ratio (1/K)
0.2	1	5
2.2	10	4.545
24	100	4.167
260	1,000	3.846
2800	10,000	3.571
30000	100,000	3.333
320000	1,000,000	3.125

== See also ==
- Compensated gross tonnage
- List of world's largest ships by gross tonnage
- Ton
- Tonnage
