= Violence against women in Peru =

Public health issue of violent acts against women

Violence against women in Peru is defined as harassment or violence propagated against those who are born women. Intimate partner violence (IPV) is the most common form of gender-based violence that occurs though it can occur concurrently with sexual and emotional violence.

Peruvian women fare differently than men, experiencing higher rates of poverty and domestic and sexual violence. According to the World Health Organization, 49% of ever-partnered women (women who had been married, lived with a man, or had a regular sexual partner) in Lima and 61% in Cusco reported physical violence by a partner at some time in their life. For sexual violence by a partner these percentages were 23% in Lima and 47% in Cusco.

== Gender-based violence ==
The status and discrimination of women in Peru is complex because it varies with class, ethnicity, and the economic place of women in traditional Peruvian society. Unlike women in the U.S., women who live in Peru have often been involved in agricultural products as well as handicraft. This complexity has often not been recognized by the Peruvian government.

The Peruvian Constitution of 1993 recognized a person's fundamental right to its moral, physical, and psychological integrity. However, it didn't specifically expand these protections to women, nor does it have specific discrimination laws that apply to women. The following sections outline the types of gender-based violence that women experience.

=== Domestic violence ===
In 2006, Ministry of Women and Social Development (MIMDES) centers reported 25,036 cases of domestic violence in Peru. The centers helped an average of 2,067 men and women per month. MIMDES also operated a toll-free hot line, which handled 7,785 requests for assistance regarding family disturbances during 2006.

Women's organizations noted that alcohol abuse and traditional attitudes toward women aggravated the problems of rape and sexual abuse - particularly in rural areas. In November 2006, the World Health Organization reported that 69 percent of Peruvian women said they had suffered from some form of physical violence in their lives.

Abuses are aggravated and perpetuated law enforcement practice, and laws that government discrimination against women. MIMDES and NGOs stated that many domestic abuse cases went unreported. NGO sources stated that the majority of reported cases did not result in formal charges because of fear of retaliation or because of the expense of filing a complaint. The legal and physical protections offered were limited because of legal delays, ambiguities in the law, and the lack of shelters for victims. According to a study done in Lima, Peru in 2007, abused women have a 1.63-fold increased risk for unintended pregnancy. Additionally, women who have experienced both physical and sexual abuse are 3.31 fold more likely to get unintentionally pregnant.

Stereotypes and traditions normalize cycles of abuse. Across socioeconomic urban classes, "Mas me pegas, mas te quiero" (The more you beat me, the more I love you) is used to refer to amor serrano (high land love). This suggest two things: first, those in Peru tend to blame battered women who are poor and indigenous for the abuse they experience and second, that women enjoy violence.

Migration within Peru remains a significant issue in Peru. According to Alcalde, it can produce one of two outcomes. First, it may allow a woman to leave her abuser behind but second, migration to Lima may further entrench violence because women (in a new city) have to rely on an abusive partner.

OjoPúblico reported in 2025 that 2,239 officers of the National Police of Peru were investigated between 2018 and 2024 for allegations of violence against women, with the outlet noting that 269 officers were repeat offenders and that many did not face discipline for their alleged violent acts.

=== Femicides ===
Between the years 2010 and 2017, 837 women were murdered in Peru while another 1,172 murder attempts were made during the period. A 2015 study found that in about 81% of the cases of attempted femicide, no measures were taken by authorities to protect the survivor, and 24% of women who turned to the justice system for help were later murdered by the very men from whom they had sought protection.

=== LGBTQ violence ===
There has been a significant amount of violence propagated against the Peruvian LGBTQ population. First, according to a study done to determine the prevalence of sexual coercion among young adults in Peru, men and women who reported heterosexual coercion reported more lifetime STDs, lower age at first sex, and future homosexual behavior in men.

Second, the Peruvian transgender population has also faced discrimination and violence. Studies among MSM in Peru have shown that trans women show a higher proportion of HIV infection. This is often linked to higher rates of drug abuse, sex work, and lack of access to education. Additionally, trans women in Peru are often victims of IPV and do not receive aid from the police. These factors have caused overall HIV prevalence among trans women in Lima, Peru to be 29.6%.

=== Sexual violence ===
Peru demonstrates the complicity of the state government in the perpetration and perpetuation of sexual violence. However, the rationale and motives for committing sexual violence have differed across region and changed over time.

Whether the state promotes sexual violence or rather just allows it to occur is difficult to ascertain because of lack of access to classified state record or testimonies. However, aggregated analyses have shown a pattern in state conflict and sexual violence. Through Peru's conflict with rebels, there were two peaks in the number of sexual abuses that corresponded with particularly difficult times during the conflict. Linked with the weakening of the PCP-SL after Abimael Guzmán was captured in 1992, the number of sexual violence incidents in Peru decreased significantly. This correlation suggests that the state used sexual violence as a tool of war. However, though it was widespread, sexual violence in Peru tended to be more selected and perpetrated with deliberation - about 71% of cases involved a single victims. Rather than engaging in gang-rape, victims were often picked if they were identified as opposition to the state.

Past sexual violence against women during this period of internal conflict, the shocks of the violence had long-term health implications for women. Based on a study done by Grimard et al., the shock of the violence had an adverse effect on pregnant women, often stunting the growth of their children. This was true even when controlling for socioeconomic conditions.

In 2001, Interim President Valentín Paniagua chartered a twelve-person commission to investigate human rights violations. The commission took about two years to submit its final report. The report found that rape was the most frequent for of abuse, constituting about 48% in Peru. Military officials were the most frequent offender (48% in Peru). Additionally, sexual violence was most often committed while victims were detained (52% in Peru).

Finally, sexual violence in Peru was and often still is perpetuated towards its indigenous population. According to the National Statistics Institute, 20% of Peru's population is indigenous. These communities are politically and economically disadvantaged in comparison with the national population. The state responded with disproportionate violence and repression.

=== Street harassment ===
On par with other Latin American countries, street harassment is a prevalent problem in Peru. As a result, citizens created the Paremos el Acoso Callejero (PAC) initiative in 2012, which translates to 'Let's stop street harassment'. The purpose of this initiative was to analyze the structures of everyday violence towards women in Peru, such as catcalling. Additionally, this initiative was unique because it started on Facebook, Twitter, and DATEA, a platform that gives women the opportunity to geo-reference their experiences. Past being broadly successful with women, the PAC initiative has partnered with the Peruvian parliament spurring the only anti-street harassment law in Latin America.

== Prevention programs ==
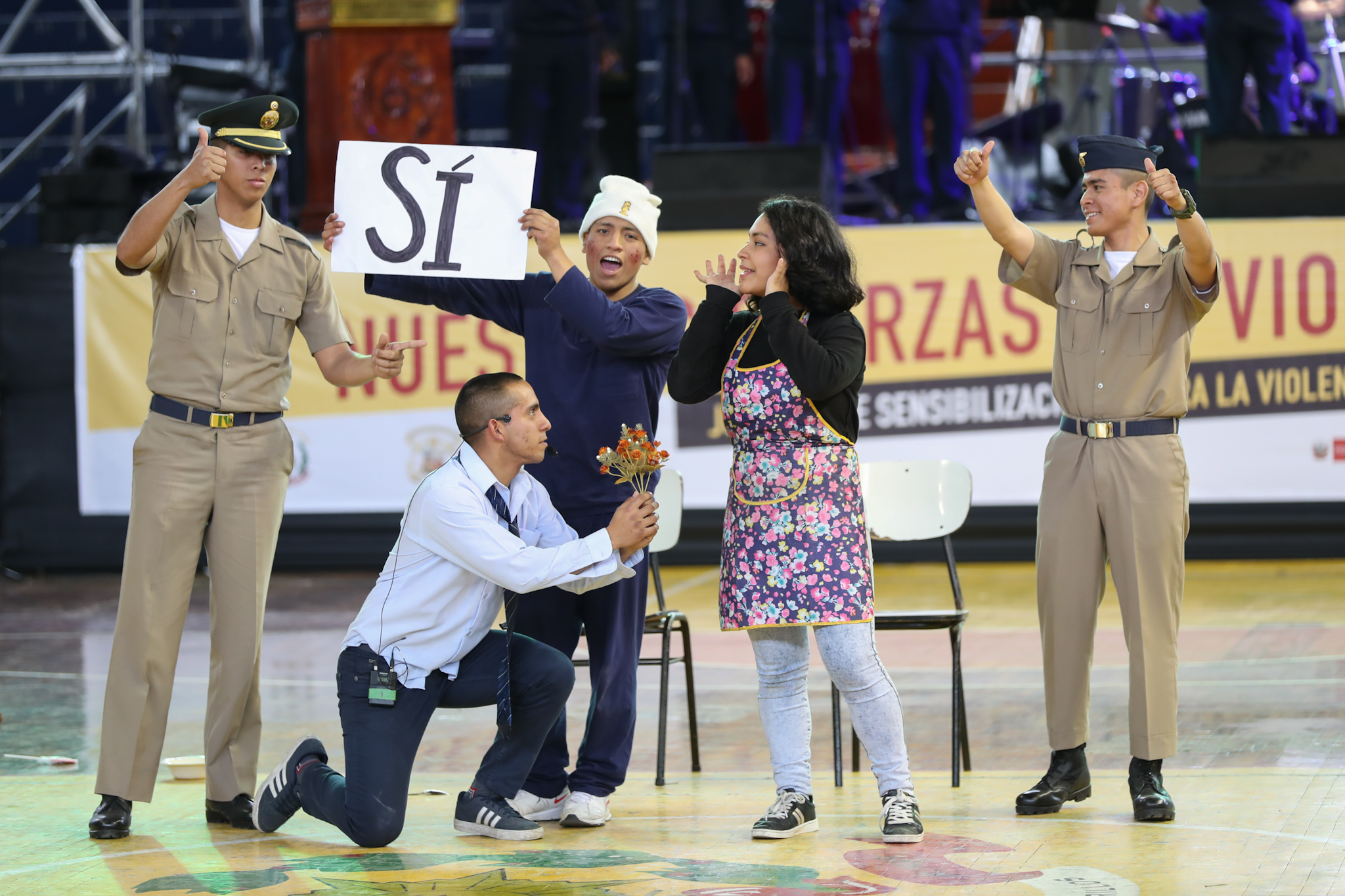
Say "yes" to respecting women

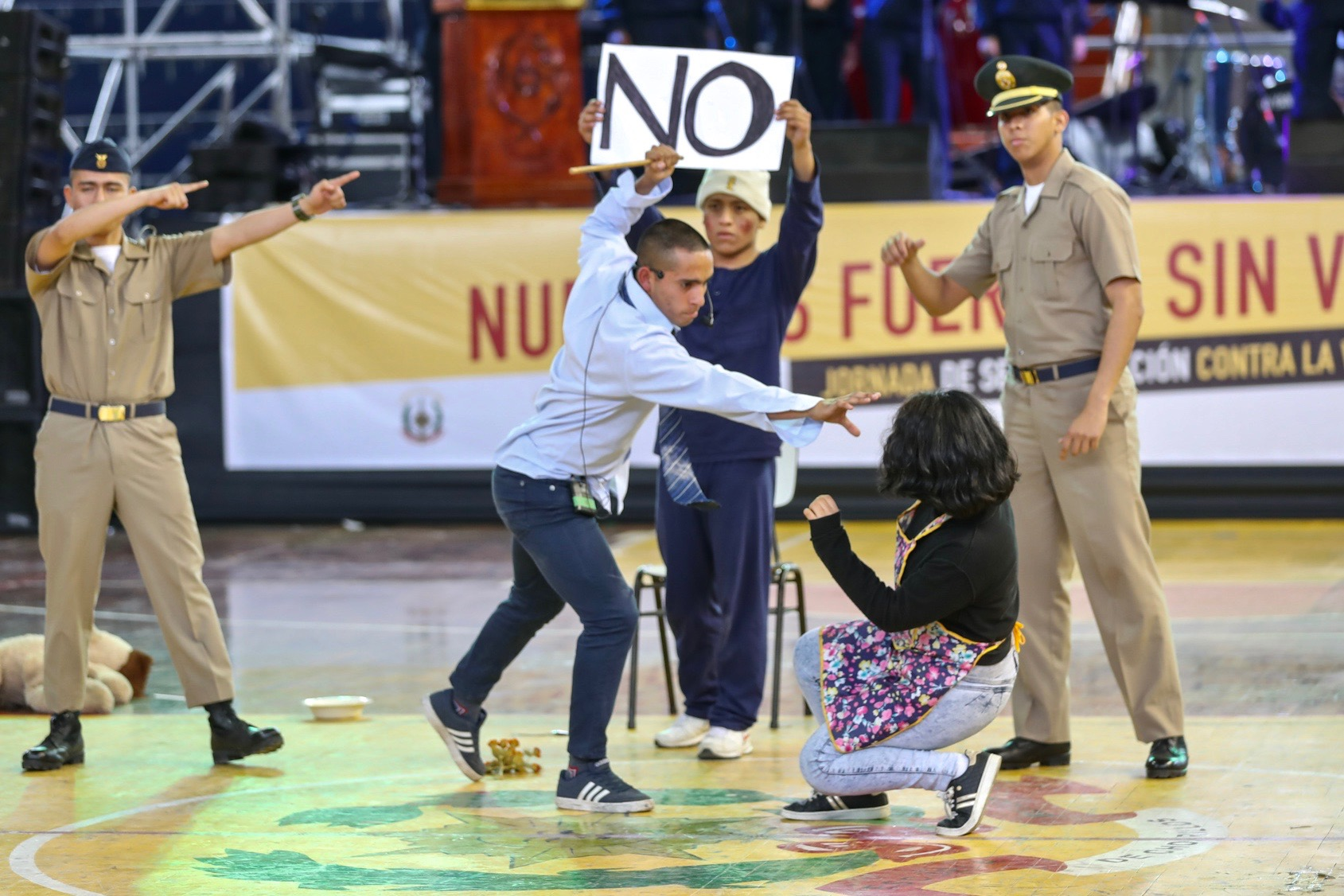
Say "no" to violence against women

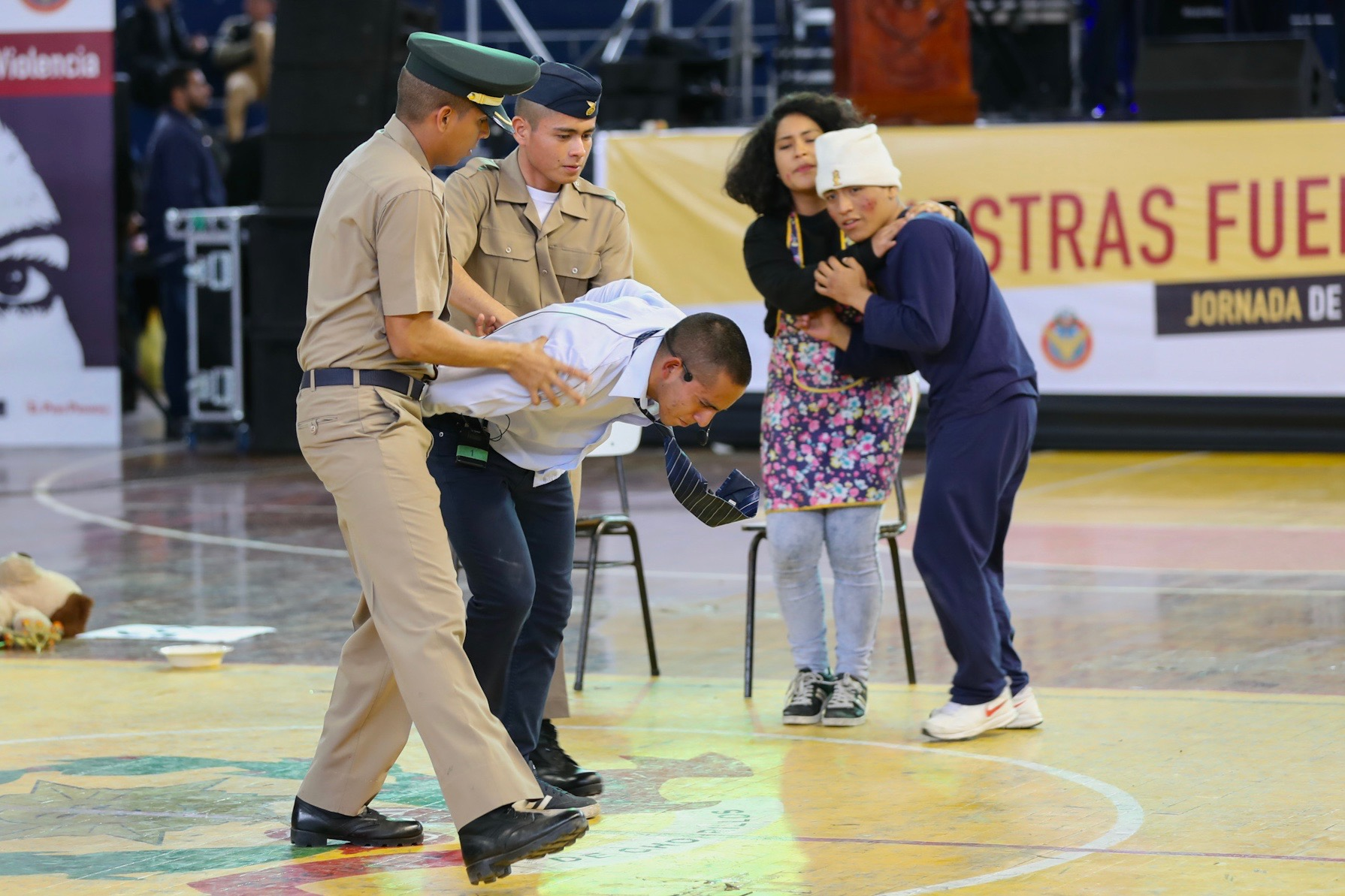
The result of violence is arrest.
Source: Government of Peru

The Peruvian government and population has recognized gender-based as a prevalent issue. Therefore, it has instituted a variety of programs to address violence directed towards women.

=== Law ===
The law prohibits domestic violence, and penalties range from one month to six years in prison. The law gives judges and prosecutors the authority to prevent the convicted spouse or parent from returning to the family's home and authorizes the victim's relatives and unrelated persons living in the home to file complaints of domestic violence.

The law also allows health professionals to document injuries. The law requires police investigation of domestic violence to take place within five days and obliges authorities to extend protection to women and children who are victims of domestic violence.

Specific laws that address intimate partner violence (IPL) in Peru include the Family Violence Law (FVL) in 1993. Several non-partisan organizations in Peru have applauded this law to address domestic violence, but say that there should be other factors included. For example, non-married couples are not included under the law. Additionally, the law does not cover victims of sexual violence and victims have to undergo a long, bureaucratic processes to press charges. Finally, the other flaw is that the laws require couples to attempt reconciliation even with proof of abuse.

Attempting to use Western-informed laws to address gender-based violence in Peru often fail because they don't take into account unique cultural or political factors that affect behavior. Studies contend that Peru should attempt to identify its own risk factors.

=== NGOs ===
MIMDES runs the Women's Emergency Program, which seeks to address the legal, psychological, and medical problems facing victims of domestic violence. As of 2006 MIMDES operated 39 centers, bringing together police, prosecutors, counselors, and public welfare agents together to help victims of domestic abuse. MIMDES continues efforts to sensitize government employees and the citizenry to domestic violence. In 2006, the Ombudsman's Office continued to complain that police officers reacted indifferently to charges of domestic violence, despite legal requirements to investigate the complaints. Also in 2006, female community leaders, former members of congress, and local media outlets launched awareness campaigns to provide citizens with more information about domestic violence.

Second, the Women's Information and Documentation Centre's main objective is to contribute to the equality between the genders and to facilitate changes in Peruvian society. Through mostly cultural means, it retains bibliographical information.

Third, there have been several groups that have engaged in advocacy and consciousness-raising regarding violence against the Peruvian LGBTQ population. For example, GALF, a Peruvian feminist lesbian group, organized to spur change against lesbophobia. GALF built partnerships within the gay community as well as with heterosexual feminist groups and services.

== See also ==
- Crime in Peru
- NiUnaMenos (Peru)
- Women in Peru
