= Compensated gross tonnage =

Indicator of the amount of work necessary to build a ship

Compensated Gross Tonnage (CGT) is an indicator of the amount of work necessary to build a given ship and is calculated by multiplying the tonnage of a ship by a coefficient, which is determined according to the type and size of a particular ship.

The standard CGT system was developed in 1977 by the OECD so that inter-country shipbuilding output could be reasonably compared, as different types of ships require a greater or lesser degree of work relative to their gross tonnage. For example, passenger ferry of a given size would require substantially more work to build than a bulk carrier of the same size due to the differing design requirements, internal structure, and required level of detail, but simply comparing the gross tonnage or deadweight of each ship would incorrectly show that they took the same amount of work. When expanded on a national scale, this difference could greatly mislead people as to the actual maritime production capacity of a given country.

The formula to calculate CGT was revised by the OECD in 2007.
