= General Workers Central =

CGT
- General Workers Central
- Central General de Trabajadores
- Headquarters: Tegucigalpa, Honduras
- Location: Honduras
- Members: 65,000
- Affiliations: ITUC

The General Workers Central (Spanish: Central General de Trabajadores; CGT), also known as the General Workers Confederation and the General Confederation of Labor, is a national trade union center in Honduras. It is traditionally associated with the National Party of Honduras.

When, in January 2009 two Honduran factories (Hugger and VisionTex) that were part of Nike, Inc.'s supply chain went bankrupt and closed, the CGT of Honduras claimed that Nike bore some of the responsibility for providing terminal compensation, benefits and priority rehiring for 1,800 factory employees.

The CGT is affiliated with the World Confederation of Labor, and hence the International Trade Union Confederation.
