= Central General de Trabajadores (Dominican Republic) =

CGT
- Central General de Trabajadores
- Headquarters: Santo Domingo, Dominican Republic
- Location: Dominican Republic
- Key people: Rafael Abreu, general secretary
- Affiliations: ITUC

The Central General de Trabajadores (CGT) is a trade union centre in the Dominican Republic. It is affiliated with the International Trade Union Confederation.
