= NiUnaMenos (Peru) =

Peruvian grassroots feminist group

#NiUnaMenos (Peru)
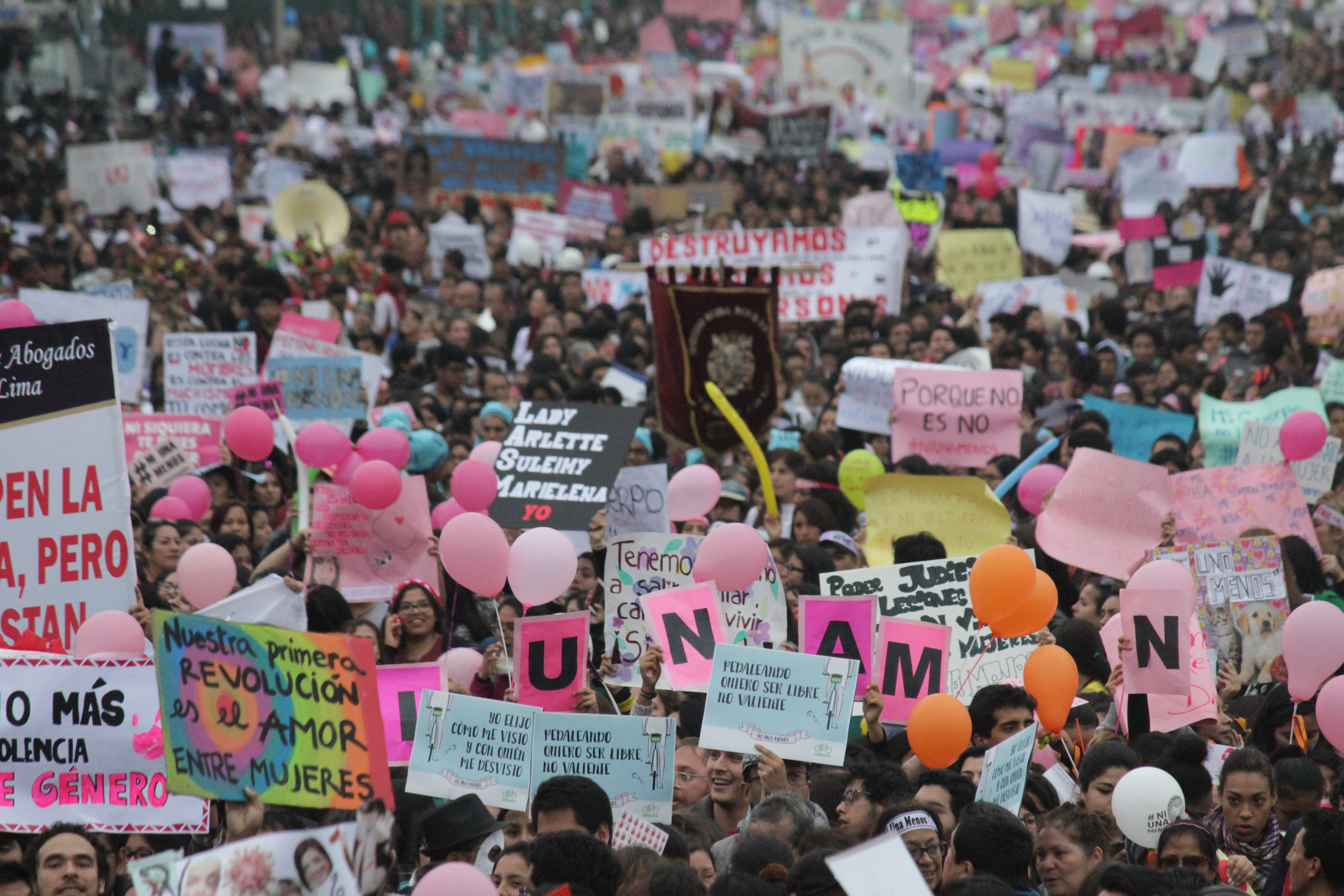
- NiUnaMenos of Lima
- Date: 13 August 2016; 25 November 2017
- Location: Lima, Peru
- Cause: Protest against femicides and violence against women in Peru
- Participants: 200,000—500,000 (2016); Tens of thousands (2017)

#NiUnaMenos (Spanish: Not one less) is a Peruvian group against femicides and violence against women in the Andean country. The movement was formed in July 2016, and the march it staged in August 2016 has been characterized as the largest demonstration in Peruvian history.

== Background ==
=== Statistics ===
According to Peru's National Statistics Institute 2014 survey, 32.3% of Peruvian women had at some point experienced physical violence from a spouse or partner, and 11.9% had experienced such in the previous 12 months. The country's national human rights ombudsman's office has estimated that every month 10 women are killed by their partners. A 2015 study by the same office revealed that from January 2009 to October 2015, 795 femicides were committed, but the courts had issued only 84 sentences between 2012 and 2015. In 81% of the cases of attempted femicide no measures were taken by authorities to protect the survivor, and 24% of women who turned to the justice system for help were later murdered by the very men from whom they had sought protection.

In 2017, between January and September there were 94 femicides, 5,707 sexual assaults and 21,000 assaults. Of the 5,707 sexual assaults, 71.33% of victims were children.

== Movement ==
The protest was called as a show of indignation following the freeing from jail of convicted batterer Adriano Pozo Arias. In July 2015 Pozo had been captured on video attacking his girlfriend, lawyer Cindy Arlette Contreras Bautista, in a hotel in the city of Ayacucho, and dragging her by the hair. The attack left her with damage to one of her legs, necessitating the use of a cane. On 22 July 2016 a three-judge panel issued Pozo a 1-year suspended prison sentence and ordered him released from jail.

== Protests ==
=== 2016 ===
The demonstration was called with the hashtags "#NiUnaMenos" and "#A13", and the slogan "If they lay a hand on one of us, they lay a hand on all of us" (Si tocan a una, tocan a todas). The protest took place in the streets of Lima, and other cities, on August 13, 2016.

The march in Lima started at the El Campo de Marte park, and proceeded to Plaza San Martín in Lima's historic downtown, before ending with a rally before the Palace of Justice. It was attended by an estimated 200,000 to 500,000 people (though at least one news outlet puts the figure at 1 million), comprising a column 30 blocks long, led by Cindy Arlette Contreras Bautista, Lady Guillén, and other women who had survived violence. It has been characterized as the largest march in Peruvian history.

=== 2017 ===
On 25 November 2017, NiUnaMenos again organized tens of thousands of Peruvians to march against violence towards women. The march began near the Palace of Justice and concluded in Plaza San Martín.

=== 2018 ===
On 2 June 2018, after the death of Eyvi Ágreda, a 22 years-old woman who was burned to death by her stalker, NiUnaMenos protesters were teargassed by police as they demonstrated outside the Palace of Justice in Lima demanding justice in femicide cases and an end to impunity.

== See also ==
- Gender-based violence in Peru
