= Arlette Contreras =

Peruvian lawyer and advocate for women

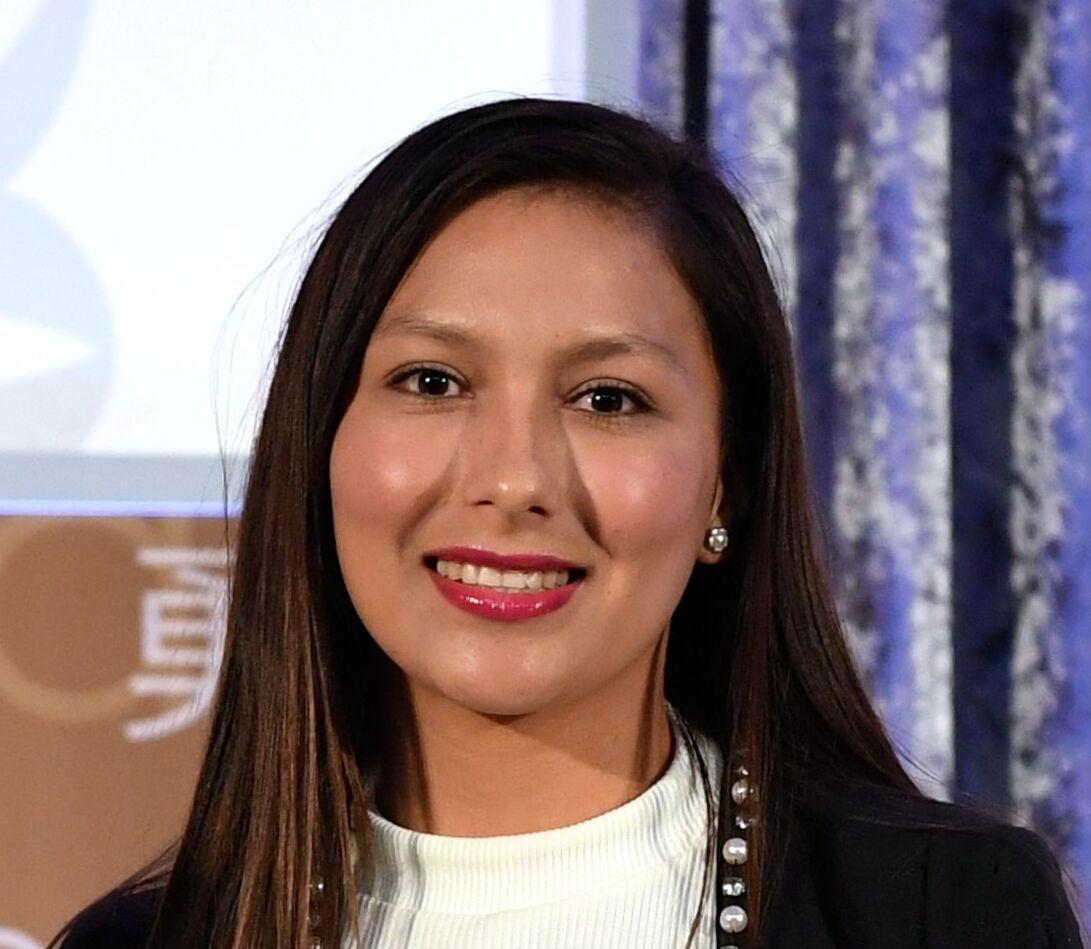
- Contreras in 2017

Member of Congress
- In office 16 March 2020 – 26 July 2021
- Constituency: Lima

Personal details
- Born: 26 June 1990 (age 36) Ayacucho, Peru
- Party: Independent (2019-present)
- Education: Universidad Alas Peruanas (LL.B.); Pontifical Catholic University of Peru (M.A.)
- Occupation: Lawyer
- Known for: Being an advocate for women's rights

Cindy Arlette Contreras Bautista (born June 26, 1990) is a Peruvian lawyer and social activist. She is an International Women of Courage Award recipient, and was also included in the Time 100 list of the most influential people.

== Assault incident ==
Contreras became known after she was assaulted at a hotel in Ayacucho by her then boyfriend, Adriano Pozo Arias, on 15 July 2015. Security cameras recorded her being battered and dragged screaming by her hair. The attack left her with damage to one of her legs, necessitating the use of a cane. Contreras went public with her demand for justice and pressed her case in the media.

The evidence against her assailant was sufficient for a conviction but a three judge panel decided that he should be given a suspended sentence in July 2016. The violence toward her and the treatment afterward became a rallying point for the nationwide NiUnaMenos movement. The march in Lima was said to be the largest demonstration ever in Peru. In November 2016, the Appeals Tribunal of the Ayacucho Superior Court threw out the conviction and ordered a new trial on charges of attempted rape and attempted femicide. On 8 July 2019, he was convicted to 11 years in prison for attempted femicide, but cleared of attempted rape.

== Recognition ==
In 2017 Contreras' advocacy was recognised by the US State Department who chose her with twelve others to receive an International Women of Courage Award each in Washington. She was also chosen as an "Icon" by Time magazine for their list of the 100 most influential people and listed as part of the 2018 BBC's 100 Women.
