= 2021 Mexican local elections =

- 6 June 2021

15 governorships 30 state congresses 1,910 municipalities
- PAN hold PVEM gain MC gain Morena hold Morena gain No election PAN-led hold PAN-led gain PRI-led gain PVEM-led gain Morena-led hold Morena-led gain No overall control No election

The 2021 Mexican local elections, held on June 6, 2021, saw voters electing fifteen governors for six-year terms, deputies for thirty state congresses, and officials for 1,910 municipalities. These elections took place concurrently with the country's federal legislative election. The elections, alongside the federal legislative election, were one of the most violent in the country's history, with 91 candidates assassinated prior to election day.

In the lead-up to the election, two prominent electoral alliances were formed: the ruling coaltiton Juntos Hacemos Historia, a left-wing coalition consisting of MORENA, the Labor Party and the Ecologist Green Party of Mexico, and Va por México, a big-tent featuring the National Action Party, the Institutional Revolutionary Party and the Party of the Democratic Revolution. Additionally, Citizens' Movement participated in the elections as an independent party. 13 of the 15 gubernatorial seats up for election were being defended by a party in Va por México.

In the gubernatorial elections, Juntos Hacemos Historia achieved remarkable success, securing twelve out of the fifteen governorships, flipping eleven, while Va por México was only able to successfully defend two of their thirteen seats. The Institutional Revolutionary Party suffered the biggest loss, losing all of its seats up for election to Juntos Haremos Historia, marking the end of the party's state level dominance in Mexican politics.

== Background ==
Prior to the campaigning period, 25 state governors signed an agreement with President Andrés Manuel López Obrador, which stated that they would maintain neutrality during the elections, uphold the people's free will, reject funding from organized crime, and abstain from utilizing official funds to back specific candidates or parties.

=== Influence of organized crime ===
Several different criminal gangs implicated in drug trafficking, human trafficking, and fuel theft have a great deal of political influence in some states. The Sinaloa Cartel exercises considerable control in the northwest while the Jalisco New Generation Cartel′s (CJNG) influence is in the west, including the states of Michoacan and Guerrero. The Gulf Cartel and Los Zetas are powerful in the northeast.

In the past, drug cartels have influenced campaigns by supporting candidates and even running some of their own members or sympathizers as candidates for office, such as Lucero Sánchez López, former federal deputy from Sinaloa who was also Joaquín "El Chapo" Guzmán′s lover. Election-related violence is of particular concern in Michoacan, not only because of the aforementioned drug cartels but also because of armed community police who often act as vigilantes.

== Incidents ==
=== Political assassinations ===
During the campaigning period, 91 candidates were assassinated, where 80% of the cases involved individuals who belonged to a party that did not control the state government. The secretary of Security and Civilian Protection, Rosa Icela Rodríguez, promised to step up security and provide protection to candidates who received threats.

=== Irregularities and fines ===
The Instituto Nacional Electoral (INE) canceled the registration of 19 candidates of MORENA for failure to report pre-campaign expenses.

The INE canceled the registration of 49 candidates affiliated with MORENA for failing to report expenses related to their pre-electoral campaigns, which affected two gubernatorial, 25 federal deputies, six local deputies, twelve municipal presidents, and four borough president candidates. Two candidates for federal deputy and one for governor of Michoacan from the Michoacán a Redes Sociales Progresistas were also withdrawn. The party was fined MXN $6,714,893.30. Fines were also imposed on PRD (MXN $409,031), MC ($227,886), independents ($182,361), PES ($98,782), Redes Sociales Progresistas ($85,229), PAN ($26,845), and PVEM ($1,476).

The FGR (Federal Elections Prosecutor) is investigating about 80 complaints about Internet celebrities (Spanish: influencers) who illegally used social media to sway votes toward the PVEM.

The INE said that 300 polling places could not be installed in Chiapas, Michoacán or Oaxaca due to social conditions that make voting dangerous or impossible.

=== Election day violence ===
Daniel Serrano, candidate (MORENA) for municipal president in Cuautitlán Izcalli, complained about vote buying on election day. The Instituto Electoral del Estado de México (IEEM) says that irregularities and violence on election day in Nextlalpan, State of Mexico, make it impossible to give a preliminary vote count (PREP), it may be necessary to hold another election. PRI says that vandals entered the candidate's house and burned it, in addition to sexually assaulting the candidate, and they destroyed voting material. MORENA says the allegation are false.

Violence was reported in Amecameca, Metepec, Naucalpan, Nextlalpan, and Valle de Chalco.

== Gubernatorial races summary ==
| State | Incumbent | | Candidates |
| State | Governor | Party | Candidates |
|---|---|---|---|
| Baja California | Jaime Bonilla Valdez | National Regeneration Movement | ▌ ✓ Marina del Pilar Ávila Olmeda (MORENA); ▌ Jorge Hank Rhon (PES); ▌ Lupita Jones (PAN) |
| Baja California Sur | Carlos Mendoza Davis | | ▌ ✓ Víctor Manuel Castro Cosío (MORENA); ▌ Francisco Pelayo Covarrubias (PAN) |
| Campeche | Carlos Miguel Aysa González | Institutional Revolutionary Party | ▌ ✓ Layda Elena Sansores (MORENA); ▌ Eliseo Fernandez (MC); ▌ Christian Castro (PRI) |
| Chihuahua | Javier Corral Jurado | | ▌ ✓ María Eugenia Campos Galván (PAN); ▌ Juan Carlos Loera de la Rosa (MORENA); ▌ Alfredo Lozoya Santillán (MC) |
| Colima | José Ignacio Peralta | Institutional Revolutionary Party | ▌ ✓ Indira Vizcaíno Silva (MORENA); ▌ Mely Romero Celis (PAN); ▌ Leoncio Morán Sánchez (MC); ▌ Virgilio Mendoza Amezcua (PVEM) |
| Guerrero | Héctor Astudillo Flores | Institutional Revolutionary Party | ▌ ✓ Evelyn Salgado Pineda (MORENA); ▌ Mario Moreno Arcos (PRI) |
| Michoacán | Silvano Aureoles Conejo | Party of the Democratic Revolution | ▌ ✓ Alfredo Ramírez Bedolla (MORENA); ▌ Carlos Herrera Tello (PRD) |
| Nayarit | Antonio Echevarría García | | ▌ ✓ Miguel Ángel Navarro Quintero (MORENA); ▌ Ignacio Flores Medina (MC); ▌ Gloria Elizabeth Núñez (PAN) |
| Nuevo León | Jaime Rodríguez Calderón | Independent | ▌ ✓ Samuel García Sepúlveda (MC); ▌ Adrián de la Garza (PRI); ▌ Fernando Larrazábal Bretón (PAN); ▌ Clara Luz Flores (MORENA) |
| Querétaro | Francisco Domínguez Servién | | ▌ ✓ Mauricio Kuri González (PAN); ▌ Celia Maya García (MORENA); ▌ Abigail Arredondo Ramos (PRI) |
| San Luis Potosí | Juan Manuel Carreras | Institutional Revolutionary Party | ▌ ✓ Ricardo Gallardo Cardona (PVEM); ▌ Octavio Pedroza Gaitán (PAN); ▌ Mónica Rangel Martínez (MORENA) |
| Sinaloa | Quirino Ordaz Coppel | Institutional Revolutionary Party | ▌ ✓ Rubén Rocha Moya (MORENA); ▌ Mario Zamora Gastélum (PRI) |
| Sonora | Claudia Pavlovich Arellano | Institutional Revolutionary Party | ▌ ✓ Alfonso Durazo (MORENA); ▌ Ernesto Gándara Camou (PRI) |
| Tlaxcala | Marco Antonio Mena Rodríguez | Institutional Revolutionary Party | ▌ ✓ Lorena Cuéllar Cisneros (MORENA); ▌ Anabell Ávalos Zempoalteca (PRI) |
| Zacatecas | Alejandro Tello Cristerna | Institutional Revolutionary Party | ▌ ✓ David Monreal Ávila (MORENA); ▌ Claudia Anaya Mota (PRI) |

== State races ==
=== Aguascalientes ===
All 27 seats of the Congress of Aguascalientes were up for election, where 18 were elected through first-past-the-post voting and 9 through proportional representation. Additionally, all positions of the state's 11 municipalities were up for election.

2021 Congress of Aguascalientes election
| Party | Before | After | Change |
|---|---|---|---|
| National Action Party | 12 | 13 | ▲1 |
| Morena | 5 | 6 | ▲1 |
| Institutional Revolutionary Party | 4 | 1 | ▼3 |
| Solidarity Encounter Party | 2 | 0 | ▼2 |
| Party of the Democratic Revolution | 1 | 4 | ▲3 |
| Ecologist Green Party of Mexico | 1 | 1 | Steady |
| Citizens' Movement | 1 | 1 | Steady |
| New Alliance Party | 1 | 0 | ▼1 |
| Labor Party | 0 | 1 | ▲1 |
| Total | 27 | 27 | |

=== Baja California ===
All 25 seats of the Congress of Baja California were up for election, where 17 were elected through first-past-the-post voting and 8 through proportional representation. Additionally, the governorship and all positions of the state's 5 municipalities were up for election. Nearly all the members of the state congress were seeking reelection, except five, which sought other positions in the government.

2021 Congress of Baja California election
| Party | Before | After | Change |
|---|---|---|---|
| Morena | 13 | 13 | Steady |
| Labor Party | 2 | 3 | ▲1 |
| Ecologist Green Party of Mexico | 2 | 1 | ▼1 |
| National Action Party | 2 | 3 | ▲1 |
| Party of the Democratic Revolution | 1 | 0 | ▼1 |
| Institutional Revolutionary Party | 1 | 1 | Steady |
| Citizens' Movement | 1 | 1 | Steady |
| Solidarity Encounter Party | 0 | 3 | ▲3 |
| Independents | 3 | 0 | ▼3 |
| Total | 27 | 27 | |

2021 Baja California gubernatorial election
| Candidate | Party | Votes | % |
|---|---|---|---|
| Marina del Pilar Ávila Olmeda | Juntos Hacemos Historia | 542,035 | 49.69 |
| Jorge Hank Rhon | Solidarity Encounter Party | 346,547 | 31.77 |
| María Guadalupe Jones Garay | Va por Baja California | 129,817 | 11.90 |
| Francisco García Lizardi | Citizens' Movement | 24,547 | 2.25 |
| Carlos Atilano Peña | Baja California Party | 21,044 | 1.93 |
| Jorge Ojeda García | Force for Mexico | 14,783 | 1.36 |
| Victoria Bentley Duarte | Progressive Social Networks | 11,079 | 1.02 |
| Non-registered candidates | | 1,006 | 0.09 |
| Total | | 1,090,858 | 100.00 |
| Valid votes | | 1,090,858 | 97.60 |
| Invalid/blank votes | | 26,856 | 2.40 |
| Total votes | | 1,117,714 | 100.00 |
Source: Computo IEE BC

==== Municipal elections ====
- Mexicali Municipality – Norma Bustamante (MORENA)
- Tijuana Municipality – Montserrat Cabellero Ramirez (MORENA)

=== Baja California Sur ===
All 21 seats of the Congress of Baja California Sur were up for election, where 16 were elected through first-past-the-post voting and 5 through proportional representation. Additionally, the governorship and all positions of the state's 5 municipalities were up for election.

2021 Congress of Baja California Sur election
| Party | Before | After | Change |
|---|---|---|---|
| Morena | 8 | 9 | ▲1 |
| Solidarity Encounter Party | 3 | 0 | ▼3 |
| National Action Party | 1 | 1 | Steady |
| Institutional Revolutionary Party | 1 | 2 | ▲1 |
| Party of the Democratic Revolution | 1 | 1 | Steady |
| Labor Party | 1 | 4 | ▲3 |
| Partido de Renovación Sudcaliforniana | 1 | 2 | ▲1 |
| Humanist Party | 1 | 1 | Steady |
| Force for Mexico | 0 | 1 | ▲1 |
| Independents | 4 | 0 | ▼4 |
| Total | 21 | 21 | |

2021 Baja California Sur gubernatorial election
| Candidate | Party | Votes | % |
|---|---|---|---|
| Víctor Manuel Castro Cosío | Juntos Hacemos Historia en Baja California Sur | 125,736 | 46.48 |
| Francisco Pelayo Covarrubias | Unidos Contigo | 109,134 | 40.34 |
| Jesús Armida Castro Guzmán | Ecologist Green Party of Mexico | 8,381 | 3.10 |
| Elizabeth Guadalupe Wayas Barroso | Force for Mexico | 6,660 | 2.46 |
| Andrea Marcela Geiger Villalpando | Citizens' Movement | 5,808 | 2.15 |
| Gabriel Andrade Leyva | New Alliance Party | 4,397 | 1.63 |
| Adonai Carreón Estrada | Solidarity Encounter Party | 3,256 | 1.20 |
| Ramón Alejo Parra Ojeda | Independent | 2,561 | 0.95 |
| Manuel Dersdepanian Skotinopulos | Progressive Social Networks | 2,237 | 0.83 |
| Alejandro Javier Lage Suárez | Partido Baja California Sur Coherente | 2,182 | 0.81 |
| Non-registered candidates | | 150 | 0.06 |
| Total | | 270,502 | 100.00 |
| Valid votes | | 270,502 | 97.44 |
| Invalid/blank votes | | 7,108 | 2.56 |
| Total votes | | 277,610 | 100.00 |

=== Campeche ===
All 35 seats of the Congress of Campeche were up for election, where 21 were elected through first-past-the-post voting and 14 through proportional representation. Additionally, the governorship and all positions of the state's 13 municipalities were up for election.

2021 Congress of Campeche election
| Party | Before | After | Change |
|---|---|---|---|
| Institutional Revolutionary Party | 12 | 8 | ▼4 |
| Morena | 11 | 16 | ▲5 |
| National Action Party | 6 | 2 | ▼4 |
| Labor Party | 2 | 0 | ▼2 |
| New Alliance Party | 2 | 0 | ▼2 |
| Party of the Democratic Revolution | 1 | 0 | ▼1 |
| Ecologist Green Party of Mexico | 1 | 0 | ▼1 |
| Citizens' Movement | 0 | 9 | ▲9 |
| Total | 35 | 35 | |

2021 Campeche gubernatorial election
| Candidate | Party | Votes | % |
|---|---|---|---|
| Layda Sansores San Román | Juntos Hacemos Historia | 139,503 | 33.84 |
| Eliseo Fernández Montúfar | Citizens' Movement | 133,627 | 32.42 |
| Christian Castro Bello | Va por Campeche | 129,120 | 31.33 |
| Sandra Guadalupe Sánchez Díaz | Ecologist Green Party of Mexico | 3,289 | 0.80 |
| Nicté-Ha Aguilera Silva | Solidarity Encounter Party | 2,912 | 0.71 |
| María Magdalena Cocom Arbez | Progressive Social Networks | 2,401 | 0.58 |
| Luis Alonso García Hernández | Force for Mexico | 1,290 | 0.31 |
| Non-registered candidates | | 52 | 0.01 |
| Total | | 412,194 | 100.00 |
| Valid votes | | 412,194 | 98.07 |
| Invalid/blank votes | | 8,092 | 1.93 |
| Total votes | | 420,286 | 100.00 |

==== Municipal elections ====
- Campeche Municipality – Biby Karen Rabelo (MC)

=== Chiapas ===
All 40 seats of the Congress of Chiapas were up for election, where 24 were elected through first-past-the-post voting and 16 through proportional representation. Additionally, all positions of the state's 124 municipalities were up for election.

2021 Congress of Chiapas election
| Party | Before | After | Change |
|---|---|---|---|
| Morena | 12 | 15 | ▲3 |
| Institutional Revolutionary Party | 5 | 2 | ▼3 |
| Ecologist Green Party of Mexico | 5 | 10 | ▲5 |
| Labor Party | 5 | 6 | ▲1 |
| Social Encounter Party | 4 | 1 | ▼3 |
| Chiapas Unido | 4 | 2 | ▼2 |
| Podemos Mover a Chiapas | 2 | 2 | Steady |
| National Action Party | 1 | 1 | Steady |
| Party of the Democratic Revolution | 1 | 0 | ▼1 |
| Progressive Social Networks | 0 | 1 | ▲1 |
| Independents | 1 | 0 | ▼1 |
| Total | 40 | 40 | |

==== Municipal elections ====
- Comitán – Constantino Kánter (MORENA), former mayor of Comitán (PRI, 2005–2007). Kanter is known for supporting ranchers and landowners against indigenous rights and against the Zapatista Army of National Liberation (EZLN) during the 1994 uprising.

=== Chihuahua ===
All 33 seats of the Congress of Chihuahua were up for election, where 22 were elected through first-past-the-post voting and 11 through proportional representation. Additionally, the governorship and all positions of the state's 67 municipalities were up for election.

Before the elections, on March 4, 2021, Yuriel Armando González Lara, mayoral candidate for Nuevo Casas Grandes, was assassinated.

2021 Congress of Chihuahua election
| Party | Before | After | Change |
|---|---|---|---|
| National Action Party | 12 | 15 | ▲3 |
| Morena | 8 | 10 | ▲2 |
| Institutional Revolutionary Party | 3 | 5 | ▲2 |
| Labor Party | 2 | 1 | ▼1 |
| Ecologist Green Party of Mexico | 1 | 0 | ▼1 |
| New Alliance Party | 1 | 0 | ▼1 |
| Citizens' Movement | 0 | 2 | ▲2 |
| Independents | 6 | 0 | ▼6 |
| Total | 33 | 33 | |

2021 Chihuahua gubernatorial election
| Candidate | Party | Votes | % |
|---|---|---|---|
| María Eugenia Campos Galván | Nos Une Chihuahua | 576,176 | 43.90 |
| Juan Carlos Loera de la Rosa | Juntos Hacemos Historia en Chihuahua | 444,634 | 33.88 |
| Alfredo Lozoya Santillán | Citizens' Movement | 155,918 | 11.88 |
| Graciela Ortiz González | Institutional Revolutionary Party | 95,792 | 7.30 |
| Brenda Ríos Prieto | Ecologist Green Party of Mexico | 20,549 | 1.57 |
| Luis Carlos Arrieta Lavenant | Solidarity Encounter Party | 14,363 | 1.09 |
| María Eugenia Baeza García | Progressive Social Networks | 4,562 | 0.35 |
| Alejandro Díaz Villalobos | Force for Mexico | 0 | 0.00 |
| Non-registered candidates | | 466 | 0.04 |
| Total | | 1,312,460 | 100.00 |
| Valid votes | | 1,312,460 | 96.71 |
| Invalid/blank votes | | 44,660 | 3.29 |
| Total votes | | 1,357,120 | 100.00 |

==== Municipal elections ====
- Ciudad Juárez – Cruz Pérez Cuéllar MORENA, former state president of PAN and gubernatorial candidate in 2016

=== Coahuila ===
All positions of the state's 38 municipalities were up for election.

=== Colima ===
All 25 seats of the Congress of Colima were up for election, where 16 were elected through first-past-the-post voting and 9 through proportional representation. Additionally, the governorship and all positions of the state's 10 municipalities were up for election.

2021 Congress of Colima election
| Party | Before | After | Change |
|---|---|---|---|
| Morena | 11 | 10 | ▼1 |
| Institutional Revolutionary Party | 6 | 5 | ▼1 |
| National Action Party | 2 | 3 | ▲1 |
| Ecologist Green Party of Mexico | 1 | 2 | ▲1 |
| Citizens' Movement | 1 | 1 | Steady |
| New Alliance Party | 1 | 1 | Steady |
| Labor Party | 1 | 1 | Steady |
| Solidarity Encounter Party | 1 | 1 | Steady |
| Force for Mexico | 0 | 1 | ▲1 |
| Independents | 1 | 0 | ▼1 |
| Total | 25 | 25 | |

2021 Colima gubernatorial election
| Candidate | Party | Votes | % |
|---|---|---|---|
| Indira Vizcaíno Silva | Juntos Hacemos Historia | 99,406 | 34.21 |
| Mely Romero Celis | Sí por Colima | 81,487 | 28.04 |
| Leoncio Morán Sánchez | Citizens' Movement | 56,186 | 19.34 |
| Virgilio Mendoza Amezcua | Ecologist Green Party of Mexico | 38,897 | 13.39 |
| Claudia Yáñez Centeno | Force for Mexico | 6,307 | 2.17 |
| Aurora Diana Cruz Alcaraz | Labor Party | 4,881 | 1.68 |
| Evangelina Bañuelos Rodríguez | Progressive Social Networks | 2,734 | 0.94 |
| Non-registered candidates | | 676 | 0.23 |
| Total | | 290,574 | 100.00 |
| Valid votes | | 290,574 | 97.47 |
| Invalid/blank votes | | 7,548 | 2.53 |
| Total votes | | 298,122 | 100.00 |

=== Durango ===
All 25 seats of the Congress of Durango were up for election, where 15 were elected through first-past-the-post voting and 10 through proportional representation.

2021 Congress of Durango election
| Party | Before | After | Change |
|---|---|---|---|
| Morena | 10 | 7 | ▼3 |
| National Action Party | 5 | 6 | ▲1 |
| Institutional Revolutionary Party | 5 | 8 | ▲3 |
| Labor Party | 4 | 1 | ▼3 |
| Ecologist Green Party of Mexico | 1 | 1 | Steady |
| Party of the Democratic Revolution | 0 | 2 | ▲2 |
| Total | 25 | 25 | |

=== Guanajuato ===
All 36 seats of the Congress of Guanajuato were up for election, where 22 were elected through first-past-the-post voting and 14 through proportional representation. Additionally, all positions of the state's 46 municipalities were up for election.

On March 31, 2021, Alejandro Galicia Juárez, candidate for regidor of Apaseo el Grande, was assassinated.

2021 Congress of Guanajuato election
| Party | Before | After | Change |
|---|---|---|---|
| National Action Party | 16 | 21 | ▲5 |
| Institutional Revolutionary Party | 5 | 4 | ▼1 |
| Morena | 5 | 8 | ▲3 |
| Party of the Democratic Revolution | 2 | 0 | ▼2 |
| Ecologist Green Party of Mexico | 2 | 2 | Steady |
| Citizens' Movement | 1 | 1 | Steady |
| New Alliance Party | 1 | 0 | ▼1 |
| Independents | 4 | 0 | ▼4 |
| Total | 36 | 36 | |

==== Municipal elections ====
- León – Ricardo Sheffield (MORENA), former mayor of León (PAN 2009–2012) and gubernatorial candidate in 2018

=== Guerrero ===
All 46 seats of the Congress of Guerrero were up for election, where 28 were elected through first-past-the-post voting and 18 through proportional representation. Additionally, the governorship and all positions of the state's 80 municipalities were up for election.

2021 Congress of Guerrero election
| Party | Before | After | Change |
|---|---|---|---|
| Morena | 24 | 22 | ▼2 |
| Institutional Revolutionary Party | 10 | 11 | ▲1 |
| Party of the Democratic Revolution | 7 | 9 | ▲2 |
| Ecologist Green Party of Mexico | 2 | 2 | Steady |
| National Action Party | 1 | 1 | Steady |
| Labor Party | 1 | 1 | Steady |
| Citizens' Movement | 1 | 0 | ▼1 |
| Total | 46 | 46 | |

2021 Guerrero gubernatorial election
| Candidate | Party | Votes | % |
|---|---|---|---|
| Evelyn Salgado Pineda | Morena | 643,814 | 44.91 |
| Mario Moreno Arcos | Va por Guerrero | 580,971 | 40.52 |
| Pedro Segura Valladares | Juntos Hacemos Historia | 90,361 | 6.30 |
| Ruth Zavaleta | Citizens' Movement | 32,347 | 2.26 |
| Irma Lilia Garzón Bernal | National Action Party | 32,180 | 2.24 |
| Dolores Huerta Baldovinos | Solidarity Encounter Party | 21,227 | 1.48 |
| Manuel Negrete | Force for Mexico | 17,939 | 1.25 |
| Ambrocio Guzmán Juárez | Progressive Social Networks | 14,371 | 1.00 |
| Non-registered candidates | | 483 | 0.03 |
| Total | | 1,433,693 | 100.00 |
| Valid votes | | 1,433,693 | 96.77 |
| Invalid/blank votes | | 47,840 | 3.23 |
| Total votes | | 1,481,533 | 100.00 |

==== Municipal elections ====
- Acapulco (municipality) – Abelina López (MORENA)

=== Hidalgo ===
All 30 seats of the Congress of Hidalgo were up for election, where 18 were elected through first-past-the-post voting and 12 through proportional representation. Additionally, there were special municipal elections for Acaxochitlán and Ixmiquilpan

2021 Congress of Hidalgo election
| Party | Before | After | Change |
|---|---|---|---|
| Morena | 17 | 11 | ▼6 |
| Institutional Revolutionary Party | 5 | 8 | ▲3 |
| National Action Party | 3 | 2 | ▼1 |
| Social Encounter Party | 2 | 0 | ▼2 |
| Labor Party | 1 | 4 | ▲3 |
| Party of the Democratic Revolution | 1 | 1 | Steady |
| New Alliance Party | 1 | 2 | ▲1 |
| Ecologist Green Party of Mexico | 0 | 2 | ▲2 |
| Total | 30 | 30 | |

=== Jalisco ===
All 38 seats of the Congress of Jalisco were up for election, where 20 were elected through first-past-the-post voting and 18 through proportional representation. Additionally, all positions of the state's 125 municipalities were up for election.

2021 Congress of Jalisco election
| Party | Before | After | Change |
|---|---|---|---|
| Citizens' Movement | 19 | 16 | ▼3 |
| National Action Party | 9 | 5 | ▼4 |
| Morena | 5 | 8 | ▲3 |
| Institutional Revolutionary Party | 3 | 5 | ▲2 |
| Party of the Democratic Revolution | 1 | 0 | ▼1 |
| Labor Party | 1 | 0 | ▼1 |
| Hagamos | 0 | 2 | ▲2 |
| Ecologist Green Party of Mexico | 0 | 1 | ▲1 |
| Futuro | 0 | 1 | ▲1 |
| Total | 38 | 38 | |

==== Municipal elections ====
- Guadalajara – Ismael del Toro (MC), incumbent
- Zapopan – Juan José Frangie Saade (MC)
- Tlajomulco de Zúñiga – Salvador Zamora Zamora (MC)
- Puerto Vallarta – Luis Michel (MORENA)

=== Michoacán ===
All 40 seats of the Congress of Michoacán were up for election, where 24 were elected through first-past-the-post voting and 16 through proportional representation. Additionally, the governorship and all positions of the state's 112 municipalities were up for election.

Organized crime and indigenous groups blocked the installion of 100 of the 6,251 polling places in the state.

2021 Congress of Michoacán election
| Party | Before | After | Change |
|---|---|---|---|
| Morena | 12 | 10 | ▼2 |
| National Action Party | 8 | 8 | Steady |
| Party of the Democratic Revolution | 8 | 5 | ▼3 |
| Institutional Revolutionary Party | 5 | 8 | ▲3 |
| Labor Party | 4 | 5 | ▲1 |
| Ecologist Green Party of Mexico | 2 | 2 | Steady |
| Citizens' Movement | 1 | 1 | Steady |
| Solidarity Encounter Party | 0 | 1 | ▲1 |
| Total | 40 | 40 | |

2021 Michoacán gubernatorial election
| Candidate | Party | Votes | % |
|---|---|---|---|
| Alfredo Ramírez Bedolla | Juntos Hacemos Historia | 730,836 | 43.29 |
| Carlos Herrera Tello | Equipo por Michoacán | 680,952 | 40.33 |
| Juan Antonio Magaña de la Mora | Ecologist Green Party of Mexico | 99,856 | 5.91 |
| Mercedes Calderón García | Citizens' Movement | 66,745 | 3.95 |
| Hipólito Mora | Solidarity Encounter Party | 54,794 | 3.25 |
| Cristóbal Arias Solís | Force for Mexico | 38,858 | 2.30 |
| Alberto Abraham Sánchez Martínez | Progressive Social Networks | 16,331 | 0.97 |
| Total | | 1,688,372 | 100.00 |
| Valid votes | | 1,688,372 | 96.49 |
| Invalid/blank votes | | 61,338 | 3.51 |
| Total votes | | 1,749,710 | 100.00 |

=== Mexico City ===
All 66 seats of the Congress of Mexico City were up for election, where 33 were elected through first-past-the-post voting and 33 through proportional representation. Additionally, the entity's 16 borough mayors were up for election.

2021 Congress of Mexico City election
| Party | Before | After | Change |
|---|---|---|---|
| Morena | 37 | 31 | ▼6 |
| National Action Party | 11 | 17 | ▲6 |
| Institutional Revolutionary Party | 6 | 9 | ▲3 |
| Party of the Democratic Revolution | 6 | 5 | ▼1 |
| Labor Party | 3 | 1 | ▼2 |
| Ecologist Green Party of Mexico | 2 | 2 | Steady |
| Social Encounter Party | 1 | 0 | ▼1 |
| Citizens' Movement | 0 | 1 | ▲1 |
| Total | 66 | 66 | |

==== Borough mayoral elections ====
- Azcapotzalco: Margarita Saldaña PAN
- Álvaro Obregón: Lía Limón García PAN
- Benito Juárez: Santiago Taboada PAN
- Coyoacán: Giovanni Gutiérrez PRD
- Cuajimalpa: Adrián Rubalcava PRI
- Cuauhtémoc: Sandra Xantall Cuevas PAN
- Gustavo A. Madero: Francisco Chiguil MORENA
- Iztacalco: Raúl Armando Quintero MORENA
- Iztapalapa: Clara Brugada MORENA
- Magdalena Contreras: Luis Gerardo Quijano PRI
- Miguel Hidalgo: Mauricio Tabe PAN
- Milpa Alta: Judith Venegas MORENA
- Tláhuac: Berenice Hernández MORENA
- Tlalpan: Alfa González Magallanes PRD
- Venustiano Carranza: Evelyn Parra MORENA
- Xochimilco: José Carlos Acosta MORENA PAN and PRI request a recount.

=== Mexico State ===
All 75 seats of the Congress of the State of Mexico were up for election, where 45 were elected through first-past-the-post voting and 30 through proportional representation. Additionally, all positions of the state's 125 municipalities were up for election.

On election day, several municipalities reported irregularities and violence. In Amecameca, two people were injured in a shooting incidenty that interrupted voting. In Metepec, twenty men destroyed a polling place. In Naucalpan, a fake grenade briefly caused panic. In Valle de Chalco, two polling stations were attacked by armed gunmen, causing their early closure.

2021 Congress of the State of Mexico election
| Party | Before | After | Change |
|---|---|---|---|
| Morena | 38 | 25 | ▼13 |
| Institutional Revolutionary Party | 12 | 22 | ▲10 |
| National Action Party | 9 | 11 | ▲2 |
| Labor Party | 7 | 4 | ▼3 |
| Social Encounter Party | 5 | 0 | ▼5 |
| Party of the Democratic Revolution | 2 | 4 | ▲2 |
| Ecologist Green Party of Mexico | 2 | 2 | Steady |
| Citizens' Movement | 0 | 2 | ▲2 |
| New Alliance Party | 0 | 5 | ▲5 |
| Total | 75 | 75 | |

==== Municipal elections ====
- Tepotzotlán: Ángeles Zuppa Villegas (MC), daughter of three-time mayor Ángel Zuppa Núñez.

=== Morelos ===
All 20 seats of the Congress of Morelos were up for election, where 12 were elected through first-past-the-post voting and 8 through proportional representation. Additionally, all positions of the state's 33 municipalities were up for election.

2021 Congress of Morelos election
| Party | Before | After | Change |
|---|---|---|---|
| Morena | 6 | 7 | ▲1 |
| Social Encounter Party | 5 | 0 | ▼5 |
| Labor Party | 2 | 1 | ▼1 |
| Institutional Revolutionary Party | 1 | 2 | ▲1 |
| Party of the Democratic Revolution | 1 | 0 | ▼1 |
| National Action Party | 1 | 5 | ▲4 |
| New Alliance Party | 1 | 1 | Steady |
| Citizens' Movement | 1 | 2 | ▲1 |
| Humanist Party | 1 | 0 | ▼1 |
| Partido Socialdemócrata de Morelos | 1 | 0 | ▼1 |
| Progressive Social Networks | 0 | 1 | ▲1 |
| Morelos Progresa | 0 | 1 | ▲1 |
| Total | 20 | 20 | |

==== Municipal elections ====
- Jojutla – Juan Ángel Flores Bustamante (MORENA), incumbent
- Jiutepec – Rafael Reyes (MORENA), incumbent
- Puente de Ixtla – Claudia Mazari (MORENA)
- Cuautla – Rodrigo Arredondo (MORENA)
- Axochiapan – Félix Sánchez (MORENA)
- Tlaltizapán – Gabriel Moreno (MORENA)
- Tlaquiltenango – Carlos Franco (MORENA)

=== Nayarit ===
All 30 seats of the Congress of Nayarit were up for election, where 18 were elected through first-past-the-post voting and 12 through proportional representation. Additionally, the governorship and all positions of the state's 20 municipalities were up for election.

The National Electoral Institute (INE) warned that Governor Antonio Echevarria was evading his responsibilities, claiming that he lied about the state not having MXN $200 million needed to organize the elections.

2021 Congress of Nayarit election
| Party | Before | After | Change |
|---|---|---|---|
| National Action Party | 9 | 2 | ▼7 |
| Institutional Revolutionary Party | 8 | 1 | ▼7 |
| Party of the Democratic Revolution | 5 | 1 | ▼4 |
| Labor Party | 2 | 3 | ▲1 |
| Morena | 2 | 12 | ▲10 |
| Citizens' Movement | 1 | 4 | ▲3 |
| New Alliance Party | 1 | 3 | ▲2 |
| Ecologist Green Party of Mexico | 0 | 3 | ▲3 |
| Progressive Social Networks | 0 | 1 | ▲1 |
| Independents | 2 | 0 | ▼2 |
| Total | 30 | 30 | |

2021 Nayarit gubernatorial election
| Candidate | Party | Votes | % |
|---|---|---|---|
| Miguel Ángel Navarro Quintero | Juntos Hacemos Historia | 234,742 | 50.56 |
| Ignacio Flores Medina | Citizens' Movement | 97,723 | 21.05 |
| Gloria Núñez Sánchez | Va por Nayarit | 84,228 | 18.14 |
| Águeda Galicia Jiménez | Movimiento Levántate para Nayarit | 20,546 | 4.43 |
| Nayar Mayorquín Carrillo | Progressive Social Networks | 14,169 | 3.05 |
| Víctor Manuel Chávez Vázquez | Visión y Valores en Acción | 4,549 | 0.98 |
| Natalia Rojas Iñiguez | Solidarity Encounter Party | 4,195 | 0.90 |
| Natalia Rojas Iñiguez | Force for Mexico | 3,985 | 0.86 |
| Non-registered candidates | | 179 | 0.04 |
| Total | | 464,316 | 100.00 |
| Valid votes | | 464,316 | 97.51 |
| Invalid/blank votes | | 11,872 | 2.49 |
| Total votes | | 476,188 | 100.00 |

=== Nuevo León ===
All 42 seats of the Congress of Nuevo León were up for election, where 26 were elected through first-past-the-post voting and 16 through proportional representation. Additionally, the governorship and all positions of the state's 51 municipalities were up for election.

Mayco Fabián Tapia Quiñones, state deputy candidate, was murdered on March 24, 2021.

2021 Congress of Nuevo León election
| Party | Before | After | Change |
|---|---|---|---|
| National Action Party | 15 | 16 | ▲1 |
| Institutional Revolutionary Party | 10 | 14 | ▲4 |
| Morena | 8 | 2 | ▼6 |
| Citizens' Movement | 3 | 6 | ▲3 |
| Labor Party | 2 | 0 | ▼2 |
| Ecologist Green Party of Mexico | 1 | 2 | ▲1 |
| New Alliance Party | 1 | 2 | ▲1 |
| Social Encounter Party | 1 | 0 | ▼1 |
| Independents | 1 | 0 | ▼1 |
| Total | 42 | 42 | |

2021 Nuevo León gubernatorial election
| Candidate | Party | Votes | % |
|---|---|---|---|
| Samuel García | Citizens' Movement | 786,808 | 37.35 |
| Adrián de la Garza | Va fuerte por Nuevo León | 598,052 | 28.39 |
| Fernando Larrazábal | National Action Party | 392,901 | 18.65 |
| Clara Luz Flores | Juntos Hacemos Historia | 300,588 | 14.27 |
| Emilio Jacques Rivera | Force for Mexico | 13,863 | 0.66 |
| Carolina Garza Guerra | Solidarity Encounter Party | 7,042 | 0.33 |
| Daney Siller Tristán | Progressive Social Networks | 6,629 | 0.31 |
| Non-registered candidates | | 702 | 0.03 |
| Total | | 2,106,585 | 100.00 |
| Valid votes | | 2,106,585 | 98.30 |
| Invalid/blank votes | | 36,420 | 1.70 |
| Total votes | | 2,143,005 | 100.00 |

==== Municipal elections ====
- Monterrey – Luis Donaldo Colosio Riojas (MC), deputy of the Congress of Nuevo León (2018–2021) and son of former presidential candidate Luis Donaldo Colosio Murrieta
- Apodaca – César Garza Villarreal (PRI)
- Guadalupe – María Cristina Díaz Salazar (PRI)
- Escobedo – Andrés Mijes Llovera, (MORENA)
- Juárez – Francisco Héctor Treviño Cantú (PRI)
- San Nicolás de los Garza – Daniel Carrillo Martínez (PAN)
- Santa Catarina – Jesús Ángel Nava Rivera (PAN)
- San Pedro – Miguel Treviño de Hoyos (independent), incumbent
- Cadereyta – Cosme Julián Leal Cantú, (PAN)
- General Terán – David Jonathan Sánchez Quintanilla (MC)
- Linares – Sergio Eduardo Elizondo Guzmán (PAN)

=== Oaxaca ===
All 42 seats of the Congress of Oaxaca were up for election, where 25 were elected through first-past-the-post voting and 17 through proportional representation. Additionally, all positions of the state's 153 municipalities were up for election.

Polling places could not be installed due to social-political conflicts in seven communities. Additionally, 800 ballots were stolen in “El Ocote” y San José Llano Grande, Miahuatlán de Porfirio Díaz.

2021 Congress of Oaxaca election
| Party | Before | After | Change |
|---|---|---|---|
| Morena | 26 | 23 | ▼3 |
| Institutional Revolutionary Party | 6 | 8 | ▲2 |
| Labor Party | 3 | 3 | Steady |
| Social Encounter Party | 2 | 0 | ▼2 |
| Ecologist Green Party of Mexico | 2 | 1 | ▼1 |
| National Action Party | 1 | 2 | ▲1 |
| Party of the Democratic Revolution | 0 | 3 | ▲3 |
| New Alliance Party | 0 | 1 | ▲1 |
| Partido Unidad Popular | 0 | 1 | ▲1 |
| Independents | 2 | 0 | ▼2 |
| Total | 42 | 42 | |

=== Puebla ===
All 41 seats of the Congress of Puebla were up for election, where 26 were elected through first-past-the-post voting and 15 through proportional representation. Additionally, all positions of the state's 217 municipalities were up for election.

2021 Congress of Puebla election
| Party | Before | After | Change |
|---|---|---|---|
| Morena | 15 | 16 | ▲1 |
| National Action Party | 6 | 9 | ▲3 |
| Labor Party | 5 | 5 | Steady |
| Institutional Revolutionary Party | 5 | 6 | ▲1 |
| Social Encounter Party | 3 | 0 | ▼3 |
| Party of the Democratic Revolution | 2 | 0 | ▼2 |
| Citizens' Movement | 2 | 1 | ▼1 |
| Ecologist Green Party of Mexico | 1 | 1 | Steady |
| New Alliance Party | 1 | 1 | Steady |
| Compromiso por Puebla | 1 | 0 | ▼1 |
| Pacto Social de Integración | 0 | 2 | ▲2 |
| Total | 41 | 41 | |

=== Querétaro ===
All 25 seats of the Legislature of Querétaro were up for election, where 15 were elected through first-past-the-post voting and 10 through proportional representation. Additionally, all positions of the state's 18 municipalities were up for election.

2021 Legislature of Querétaro election
| Party | Before | After | Change |
|---|---|---|---|
| National Action Party | 11 | 13 | ▲2 |
| Morena | 6 | 5 | ▼1 |
| Institutional Revolutionary Party | 4 | 3 | ▼1 |
| Social Encounter Party | 1 | 0 | ▼1 |
| Ecologist Green Party of Mexico | 1 | 1 | Steady |
| Partido Querétaro Independiente | 1 | 3 | ▲2 |
| Independents | 1 | 0 | ▼1 |
| Total | 25 | 25 | |

2021 Queretaro gubernatorial election
| Candidate | Party | Votes | % |
|---|---|---|---|
| Mauricio Kuri | ¡Contigo y con todo! | 491,550 | 55.36 |
| Celia Maya García | Morena | 218,310 | 24.59 |
| Abigail Arredondo Ramos | Institutional Revolutionary Party | 106,301 | 11.97 |
| Katia Reséndiz Jaime | Ecologist Green Party of Mexico | 21,865 | 2.46 |
| Beatriz León Sotelo | Citizens' Movement | 14,940 | 1.68 |
| Juan Carlos Martínez | Force for Mexico | 8,946 | 1.01 |
| Miguel Nava Alvarado | Progressive Social Networks | 8,628 | 0.97 |
| Raquel Ruiz de Santiago Álvarez | Party of the Democratic Revolution | 6,473 | 0.73 |
| María de Jesús Ibarra Pérez | Solidarity Encounter Party | 5,334 | 0.60 |
| Penélope Ramírez Manríquez | Labor Party | 4,859 | 0.55 |
| Non-registered candidates | | 639 | 0.07 |
| Total | | 887,845 | 100.00 |
| Valid votes | | 887,845 | 97.69 |
| Invalid/blank votes | | 20,981 | 2.31 |
| Total votes | | 908,826 | 100.00 |

==== Municipal elections ====
- Querétaro City – Adolfo Ríos (MC)

=== Quintana Roo ===
All positions of the state's 11 municipalities were up for election.

==== Municipal elections ====
- Benito Juárez – Mara Lezama Espinosa (MORENA)
- Tulum – Marciano Dzul Caamal (MORENA)
- Solidaridad – Lili Campos Miranda (PAN)
- José María Morelos – Erik Noé Borges Yam (MORENA)

=== San Luis Potosí ===
All 27 seats of the Congress of San Luis Potosí were up for election, where 15 were elected through first-past-the-post voting and 12 through proportional representation. Additionally, the governorship and all positions of the state's 58 municipalities were up for election.

2021 Congress of San Luis Potosí election
| Party | Before | After | Change |
|---|---|---|---|
| National Action Party | 6 | 6 | Steady |
| Morena | 6 | 4 | ▼2 |
| Institutional Revolutionary Party | 5 | 4 | ▼1 |
| Labor Party | 2 | 3 | ▲1 |
| Ecologist Green Party of Mexico | 2 | 6 | ▲4 |
| Party of the Democratic Revolution | 1 | 0 | ▼1 |
| New Alliance Party | 1 | 1 | Steady |
| Citizens' Movement | 1 | 1 | Steady |
| Social Encounter Party | 1 | 0 | ▼1 |
| Partido Conciencia Popular | 1 | 1 | Steady |
| Progressive Social Networks | 0 | 1 | ▲1 |
| Independents | 1 | 0 | ▼1 |
| Total | 27 | 27 | |

2021 San Luis Potosí gubernatorial election
| Candidate | Party | Votes | % |
|---|---|---|---|
| Ricardo Gallardo Cardona | Juntos Hacemos Historia | 458,156 | 39.14 |
| Octavio Pedroza Gaitán | Sí por San Luis Potosí | 400,273 | 34.19 |
| Mónica Rangel Martínez | Morena | 139,243 | 11.90 |
| José Luis Romero Calzada | Progressive Social Networks | 105,870 | 9.04 |
| Marvelly Costanzo Rangel | Citizens' Movement | 31,527 | 2.69 |
| Adrián Esper Cárdenas | Solidarity Encounter Party | 12,889 | 1.10 |
| Francisco Javier Rico Ávalos | New Alliance Party | 12,199 | 1.04 |
| Juan Carlos Machinena Morales | Force for Mexico | 6,093 | 0.52 |
| Arturo Segoviano | Independent | 4,330 | 0.37 |
| Total | | 1,170,580 | 100.00 |
| Valid votes | | 1,170,580 | 96.32 |
| Invalid/blank votes | | 44,776 | 3.68 |
| Total votes | | 1,215,356 | 100.00 |

==== Municipal elections ====
- San Luis Potosí City – Enrique Francisco Galindo Ceballos (PRI)

=== Sinaloa ===
All 40 seats in the Congress of Sinaloa were up for election, where 24 were elected through first-past-the-post voting and 16 through proportional representation. Additionally, the governorship and all positions of the state's 18 municipalities were up for election.

2021 Congress of Sinaloa election
| Party | Before | After | Change |
|---|---|---|---|
| Morena | 21 | 20 | ▼1 |
| Institutional Revolutionary Party | 8 | 8 | Steady |
| Labor Party | 5 | 1 | ▼4 |
| National Action Party | 2 | 2 | Steady |
| Partido Sinaloense | 1 | 8 | ▲7 |
| Social Encounter Party | 1 | 0 | ▼1 |
| Citizens' Movement | 0 | 1 | ▲1 |
| Independents | 2 | 0 | ▼2 |
| Total | 40 | 40 | |

2021 Sinaloa gubernatorial election
| Candidate | Party | Votes | % |
|---|---|---|---|
| Rubén Rocha Moya | Juntos Hacemos Historia | 624,225 | 57.94 |
| Mario Zamora Gastélum | Va por Sinaloa | 358,313 | 33.26 |
| Sergio Torres Félix | Citizens' Movement | 31,897 | 2.96 |
| Gloria González Burboa | Labor Party | 19,982 | 1.85 |
| Rosa Elena Millán | Force for Mexico | 12,396 | 1.15 |
| Ricardo Arnulfo Mendoza Sauceda | Solidarity Encounter Party | 11,285 | 1.05 |
| Misael Sánchez Sánchez | Ecologist Green Party of Mexico | 10,536 | 0.98 |
| Yolanda Cabrera Peraza | Progressive Social Networks | 8,386 | 0.78 |
| Non-registered candidates | | 422 | 0.04 |
| Total | | 1,077,442 | 100.00 |
| Valid votes | | 1,077,442 | 97.70 |
| Invalid/blank votes | | 25,380 | 2.30 |
| Total votes | | 1,102,822 | 100.00 |

=== Sonora ===
All 33 seats of the Congress of Sonora were up for election, where 21 were elected through first-past-the-post voting and 12 through proportional representation. Additionally, the governorship and all positions of the state's 72 municipalities were up for election.

2021 Congress of Sonora election
| Party | Before | After | Change |
|---|---|---|---|
| Morena | 12 | 14 | ▲2 |
| Institutional Revolutionary Party | 5 | 4 | ▼1 |
| Social Encounter Party | 5 | 0 | ▼5 |
| Labor Party | 4 | 3 | ▼1 |
| National Action Party | 3 | 4 | ▲1 |
| New Alliance Party | 2 | 2 | Steady |
| Ecologist Green Party of Mexico | 1 | 2 | ▲1 |
| Citizens' Movement | 1 | 2 | ▲1 |
| Party of the Democratic Revolution | 0 | 1 | ▲1 |
| Solidarity Encounter Party | 0 | 1 | ▲1 |
| Total | 33 | 33 | |

2021 Sonora gubernatorial election
| Candidate | Party | Votes | % |
|---|---|---|---|
| Alfonso Durazo | Juntos Hacemos Historia | 496,651 | 53.37 |
| Ernesto Gándara Camou | Va por Sonora | 339,139 | 36.44 |
| Manuel Scott Sánchez | Citizens' Movement | 45,539 | 4.89 |
| María del Rosario Robles Robles | Force for Mexico | 19,426 | 2.09 |
| Carlos Zatarain González | Solidarity Encounter Party | 18,071 | 1.94 |
| David Cuahutémoc Galindo Delgado | Progressive Social Networks | 11,729 | 1.26 |
| Total | | 930,555 | 100.00 |
| Valid votes | | 930,555 | 97.08 |
| Invalid/blank votes | | 27,971 | 2.92 |
| Total votes | | 958,526 | 100.00 |

==== Municipal elections ====
- Hermosillo Municipality – Antonio Astiazarán Gutiérrez (PAN)

=== Tabasco ===
All 35 seats of the Congress of Tabasco were up for election, where 21 were elected through first-past-the-post voting and 14 through proportional representation. Additionally, all positions of the state's 17 municipalities were up for election.

2021 Congress of Tabasco election
| Party | Before | After | Change |
|---|---|---|---|
| Morena | 21 | 21 | Steady |
| Party of the Democratic Revolution | 6 | 6 | Steady |
| Institutional Revolutionary Party | 6 | 4 | ▼2 |
| Ecologist Green Party of Mexico | 1 | 3 | ▲2 |
| Citizens' Movement | 0 | 1 | ▲1 |
| Independents | 1 | 0 | ▼1 |
| Total | 35 | 35 | |

==== Municipal elections ====
- Centro Municipality (Villahermosa) – Yolanda Osuna Huerta (MORENA)

=== Tamaulipas ===
All 36 seats of the Congress of Tamaulipas were up for election, where 22 were elected through first-past-the-post voting and 14 through proportional representation. Additionally, all positions of the state's 43 municipalities were up for election.

2021 Congress of Tamaulipas election
| Party | Before | After | Change |
|---|---|---|---|
| National Action Party | 23 | 13 | ▼10 |
| Morena | 10 | 18 | ▲8 |
| Institutional Revolutionary Party | 2 | 2 | Steady |
| Citizens' Movement | 1 | 1 | Steady |
| Labor Party | 0 | 2 | ▲2 |
| Total | 36 | 36 | |

=== Tlaxcala ===
All 25 seats of the Congress of Tlaxcala were up for election, where 15 were elected through first-past-the-post voting and 10 through proportional representation. Additionally, the governorship and all positions of the state's 60 municipalities were up for election.

2021 Congress of Tlaxcala election
| Party | Before | After | Change |
|---|---|---|---|
| Morena | 11 | 8 | ▼3 |
| Labor Party | 4 | 4 | Steady |
| National Action Party | 2 | 1 | ▼1 |
| Party of the Democratic Revolution | 2 | 2 | Steady |
| Social Encounter Party | 2 | 1 | ▼1 |
| Institutional Revolutionary Party | 1 | 3 | ▲2 |
| Ecologist Green Party of Mexico | 1 | 2 | ▲1 |
| Citizens' Movement | 1 | 0 | ▼1 |
| New Alliance Party | 1 | 2 | ▲1 |
| Partido Alianza Ciudadana | 0 | 1 | ▲1 |
| Force for Mexico | 0 | 1 | ▲1 |
| Total | 25 | 25 | |

2021 Tlaxcala gubernatorial election
| Candidate | Party | Votes | % |
|---|---|---|---|
| Lorena Cuéllar Cisneros | Juntos Hacemos Historia | 305,468 | 49.93 |
| Anabell Ávalos Zempoalteca | Unidos por Tlaxcala | 231,424 | 37.83 |
| Juan Carlos Sánchez García | Progressive Social Networks | 38,771 | 6.34 |
| Eréndira Jiménez Montiel | Citizens' Movement | 14,660 | 2.40 |
| Viviana Barbosa Bonola | Force for Mexico | 11,867 | 1.94 |
| Liliana Becerril Rojas | Solidarity Encounter Party | 5,357 | 0.88 |
| Evangelina Paredes Zamora | Partido Impacto Social Si | 4,116 | 0.67 |
| Non-registered candidates | | 100 | 0.02 |
| Total | | 611,763 | 100.00 |
| Valid votes | | 611,763 | 97.47 |
| Invalid/blank votes | | 15,901 | 2.53 |
| Total votes | | 627,664 | 100.00 |

=== Veracruz ===
All 50 seats of the Congress of Veracruz were up for election, where 30 were elected through first-past-the-post voting and 20 through proportional representation. Additionally, all positions of the state's 212 municipalities were up for election.

On March 4, 2021, Melquiades Vázquez Lucas, mayoral candidate for La Perla, was assassinated.

2021 Congress of Veracruz election
| Party | Before | After | Change |
|---|---|---|---|
| Morena | 21 | 28 | ▲7 |
| National Action Party | 13 | 8 | ▼5 |
| Labor Party | 4 | 4 | Steady |
| Social Encounter Party | 4 | 0 | ▼4 |
| Institutional Revolutionary Party | 3 | 2 | ▼1 |
| Party of the Democratic Revolution | 2 | 1 | ▼1 |
| Citizens' Movement | 2 | 2 | Steady |
| Ecologist Green Party of Mexico | 1 | 4 | ▲3 |
| Force for Mexico | 0 | 1 | ▲1 |
| Total | 50 | 50 | |

=== Yucatan ===
All 25 seats of the Congress of Yucatan were up for election, where 15 were elected through first-past-the-post voting and 10 through proportional representation. Additionally, all positions of the state's 106 municipalities were up for election.

2021 Congress of Yucatan election
| Party | Before | After | Change |
|---|---|---|---|
| Institutional Revolutionary Party | 10 | 3 | ▼7 |
| National Action Party | 6 | 14 | ▲8 |
| Morena | 4 | 4 | Steady |
| Citizens' Movement | 2 | 1 | ▼1 |
| Party of the Democratic Revolution | 1 | 1 | Steady |
| Ecologist Green Party of Mexico | 1 | 1 | Steady |
| New Alliance Party | 1 | 1 | Steady |
| Total | 27 | 27 | |

=== Zacatecas ===
All 30 seats of the Congress of Zacatacas were up for election, where 18 were elected through first-past-the-post voting and 12 through proportional representation. Additionally, the governorship and all positions of the state's 58 municipalities were up for election.

2021 Congress of Zacatecas election
| Party | Before | After | Change |
|---|---|---|---|
| Morena | 8 | 12 | ▲4 |
| Institutional Revolutionary Party | 7 | 7 | Steady |
| National Action Party | 4 | 3 | ▼1 |
| Party of the Democratic Revolution | 3 | 2 | ▼1 |
| Labor Party | 2 | 3 | ▲1 |
| Ecologist Green Party of Mexico | 2 | 1 | ▼1 |
| New Alliance Party | 2 | 1 | ▼1 |
| Social Encounter Party | 2 | 0 | ▼2 |
| Solidarity Encounter Party | 0 | 1 | ▲1 |
| Total | 30 | 30 | |

2021 Zacatecas gubernatorial election
| Candidate | Party | Votes | % |
|---|---|---|---|
| David Monreal Ávila | Juntos Haremos Historia en Zacatecas | 340,934 | 50.67 |
| Claudia Anaya Mota | Va por Zacatecas | 265,557 | 39.46 |
| Ana María Romo Fonseca | Citizens' Movement | 19,428 | 2.89 |
| María Guadalupe Medina Padilla | Solidarity Encounter Party | 13,400 | 1.99 |
| Miriam García Zamora | Force for Mexico | 11,483 | 1.71 |
| Flavio Campos Miramontes | Paz para Desarrollar Zacatecas | 11,377 | 1.69 |
| Javier Valadez Becerra | Partido del Pueblo | 5,741 | 0.85 |
| Fernanda Salomé Perera Trejo | Progressive Social Networks | 2,659 | 0.40 |
| Bibiana Lizardo | Movimiento Dignidad Zacatecas | 1,946 | 0.29 |
| Non-registered candidates | | 368 | 0.05 |
| Total | | 672,893 | 100.00 |
| Valid votes | | 672,893 | 97.37 |
| Invalid/blank votes | | 18,174 | 2.63 |
| Total votes | | 691,067 | 100.00 |

== See also ==
- 2021 Mexican legislative election
- 2021 in Mexican politics and government
- List of political parties in Mexico
- List of elections in 2021
