= 2021 Mexican legislative election =

- 6 June 2021
- All 500 seats in the Chamber of Deputies; 251 seats needed for a majority
- Turnout: 52.7%
Party	Leader	Vote %	Seats	+/–
Juntos Hacemos Historia (278 seats)
MORENA	Mario Martín Delgado	35.30	198	+7
PVEM	Karen Castrejón Trujillo	5.63	43	+27
PT	Alberto Anaya	3.36	37	−24
Va por México (199 seats)
PAN	Marko Cortés Mendoza	18.89	114	+33
PRI	Alejandro Moreno Cárdenas	18.36	70	+25
PRD	Ángel Ávila Romero	3.78	15	−6
Other (23 seats)
MC	Clemente Castañeda	7.27	23	−4
This lists parties that won seats. See the complete results below.
Results by constituency

Legislative elections were held in Mexico on 6 June 2021. Voters elected 500 deputies (300 in single-member constituencies by first-past-the-post and 200 by proportional representation) to sit in the Chamber of Deputies for the 65th Congress. These elections took place concurrently with the country's state elections.

On 5 December 2020 the National Action Party, the Institutional Revolutionary Party and the Party of the Democratic Revolution announced an electoral alliance, Va por México ("Go For Mexico"). Morena, the Labour Party and the Ecologist Green Party of Mexico formed the Juntos Hacemos Historia (″Together we make history″) coalition. Both alliances were approved by the National Electoral Institute (INE).

On 13 April 2021 the INE cancelled the registrations of Manuel Guillermo Chapman (Morena), Ana Elizabeth Ayala Leyva, (Juntos Haremos Historia), and Raúl Tadeo Nava (Labor Party) for failure to certify their lack of involvement in gender violence. On 3 June, the INE warned about possible sanctions on Catholic bishops, in particular Juan Sandoval Íñiguez, for their interference in the elections.

The elections were Mexico's largest in history and were tainted by several political assassinations and the COVID-19 pandemic in Mexico.

== Background ==
=== COVID-19 pandemic ===
Several electoral events in 2020 were disrupted by the ongoing COVID-19 pandemic, leading to the postponement of the 2020 local elections from 7 June to 18 October. The National Electoral Institute (INE) implemented health protocols to mitigate the spread of the virus, which it later deemed successful.

On 3 February 2021, the INE stated that postponing the 2021 legislative election would not be advisable, with INE board president Lorenzo Córdova Vianello citing the effectiveness of the previously implemented sanitary measures. The institute also warned that a delay could trigger a constitutional crisis by preventing the timely installation of the 65th Congress.

== Electoral system ==
The National Electoral Institute (INE) oversees federal elections in Mexico. Its responsibilities include organizing election day logistics, producing and distributing electoral materials, counting votes, and certifying the election results.

Voters must present their voter ID at polling stations to cast their ballots.

On 28 April 2021, the INE announced that there were 93,528,473 registered voters in Mexico, 32,303 registered voters abroad, and 949 registered voters in preventive detention.

=== Legislative election ===
The 500 members of the Chamber of Deputies are elected in two ways: 300 are elected in single-member constituencies by plurality vote, and the remaining 200 are elected by proportional representation in five multi-member districts, with seats divided according to Hamilton's method. No party is permitted to hold more than 300 seats. Deputies are elected for three-year terms and will serve in the 65th Congress.

For the first time since 1933, deputies elected for the 64th Congress in 2018 were eligible for immediate reelection due to the 2014 electoral reform.

== Political parties and coalitions ==
Ten national political parties were registered with the INE and were eligible to participate in federal elections: the National Action Party (PAN), the Institutional Revolutionary Party (PRI), the Party of the Democratic Revolution (PRD), the Labor Party (PT), the Ecologist Green Party of Mexico (PVEM), Citizens' Movement (MC), the National Regeneration Movement (Morena), the Solidarity Encounter Party (PES), Progressive Social Networks (RSP), and Force for Mexico (FXM).

The General Law of Political Parties stipulates that national political parties can form coalitions for elections by submitting a coalition agreement to the electoral authority. Parties cannot join coalitions in their first election. As the Solidarity Encounter Party (PES), Progressive Social Networks (RSP), and Force for Mexico (FXM) were newly established parties, they were not eligible for joining a coalition.

Parties that do not reach 3% of the popular vote lose their registration as a national political party.

=== Summary ===
Party or alliance		Leader	Position
Juntos Hacemos Historia	National Regeneration Movement	Mario Delgado	Left-wing
Juntos Hacemos Historia	Ecologist Green Party of Mexico	Karen Castrejón Trujillo	Centre-left
Juntos Hacemos Historia	Labor Party	Alberto Anaya	Left-wing
Va por México	National Action Party	Marko Cortés Mendoza	Centre-right to right-wing
Va por México	Institutional Revolutionary Party	Alejandro Moreno Cárdenas	Centre or big tent
Va por México	Party of the Democratic Revolution	Ángel Ávila Romero	Centre-left to left-wing
Citizens' Movement		Clemente Castañeda	Centre to centre-left
Solidarity Encounter Party		Hugo Eric Flores Cervantes	Right-wing
Progressive Social Networks		José Fernando Gonzalez Sánchez	Centre-left
Force for Mexico		Gerardo Islas Maldonado	Centre-left

=== Juntos Hacemos Historia ===
In June 2020, Alfonso Ramírez Cuéllar, president of the National Regeneration Movement (Morena), announced an alliance with the Labor Party (PT), and the Ecologist Green Party of Mexico (PVEM), expressing full support for Andrés Manuel López Obrador's legislative agenda.

On 23 December 2020, Mario Delgado, the new president of Morena, introduced the Juntos Hacemos Historia electoral alliance, a coalition comprising Morena, PT, and PVEM. Initially planned for the coalition to run together in 150 of the 300 electoral districts, the alliance was expanded on 18 March 2021, to cover 183 districts.

Juntos Hacemos Historia
Candidate from MORENA (88)
Candidate from PVEM (50)
Candidate from PT (45)
No coalition candidate

=== Va por México ===
On 22 December 2020, the National Action Party (PAN), the Institutional Revolutionary Party (PRI) and the Party of the Democratic Revolution (PRD) formed the opposition electoral alliance Va por México. Initially planned to run together in 180 of the 300 electoral districts, on 23 December, the number was decreased to 171. On 15 February 2021, the alliance was expanded to cover a total of 219 districts.

Citizens' Movement (MC) announced that they would not form an alliance with the PAN and PRD, as they had in 2018, and would instead contest the election independently, citing disagreements with the parties.

Va por México
Candidate from PRI (77)
Candidate from PAN (72)
Candidate from PRD (70)
No coalition candidate

== Opinion polls ==
Poll Source	Date Published	Date of Poll	Sample Size	Margin of Error	Movimiento de Regeneración Nacional	Partido Revolucionario Institucional	National Action Party (Mexico)	Partido de la Revolución Democrática	Citizens' Movement (Mexico)	Other	Undecided/No Answer
Massive Caller	August 2020	No Data	600	No Data	40%	11.8%	24.2%	2.16%	3.23%	18.4%	No Data
GEA-ISA	17 September 2020	5–7 September 2020	No Data	No Data	22%	17%	14%	-	-	7%	40%
Massive Caller	19 October 2020	No Data	600	±4.3%	41.8%	12.3%	31.7%	2.3%	3.4%	8.5%	No Data
El Universal	30 November 2020	12–17 November 2020	1000	±3.54%	32%	16%	17%	4%	3%	No Data	No Data
Mitofsky	17 December 2020	No Data	No Data	No Data	28.4%	10.8%	14.9%	2.6%	2.6%	9.8%	30.9%
Mitofsky	27 December 2020	No Data	No Data	No Data	27.4%	13.9%	12.4%	3.3%	1.4%	5.8%	35.8%
El Financiero	4 February 2021	15–16 and 29–30 January 2021	1000	±3.1%	38%	10%	11%	3%	-	No Data	33%
Massive Caller	22 February 2021	19 February 2021	600	±4.1%	51.3%	10.7%	31.3%	2.0%	2.2%	No Data	No Data
El Financiero	4 March 2021	12–13 and 25–26 February 2021	1000	±3.1%	44%	10%	10%	3%	-	No Data	29%
El Financiero	8 April 2021	2–13 and 26–27 March 2021	1000	±3.1%	40%	10%	11%	3%	-	No Data	27%
Parametría	10 April 2021	31 March – 10 April 2021	800	±3.5%	32%	11%	12%	3%	4.5%	12.5%	25%
Massive Caller	16 April 2021	1–15 April 2021	600	±4.3%	42.1%	17.8%	24.1%	3.4%	4.8%	7.8%	No Data
Reforma	16 April 2021	8–13 April 2021	1200	±4.2%	45%	18%	17%	4%	3%	13%	No Data
El Financiero	5 May 2021	29 April – 2 May 2021	2000	±3.1%	40%	20%	19%	3%	5%	13%	No Data
El País	17 May 2021	10–14 May 2021	2000	±3.46%	44%	19%	18%	3%	5%	8%	—
GEA-ISA	May 2021	14–17 May 2021	1500	±2.5%	29.7%	13.0%	15.6%	4.6%	5.8%	9.8%	21.5%
Varela y Asociados	25 May 2021	29 April – 5 May 2021	1500	No Data	46%	15%	17%	5%	5%	12%	—
El Universal	27 May 2021	19–25 May 2021	1530	±2.86%	41%	15.3%	15.9%	3%	7.9%	16.9%	—
Parametria	1 June 2021	22–28 May 2021	1000	±3.1%	40%	16%	15%	3%	7%	19%	—
El Financiero	2 June 2021	14–15, 28–29, 27–30 May 2021	2000	±2.86%	39%	20%	21%	3%	5%	12%	—
Reforma	2 June 2021	22–30 May 2021	2000	±2.8%	43%	20%	18%	2%	7%	10%	—

== Conduct ==
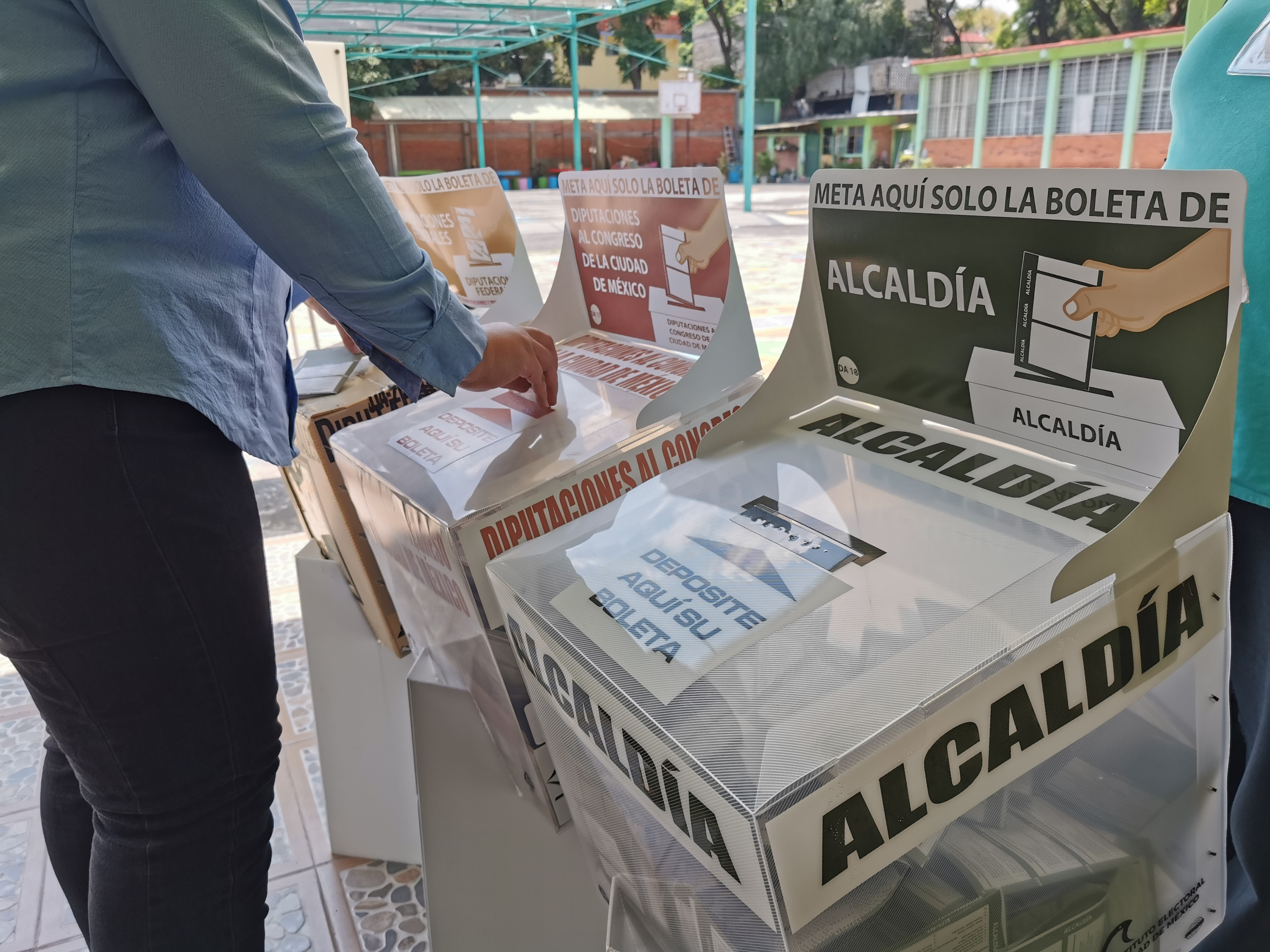
A woman inserting her vote into a ballot box, Mexico City, 6 June 2021

=== Possibility of post-election protests ===
Prior Mexican elections have been fraught with accusations of election fraud, this had led to massive protests after the majority of Mexican elections in the past two decades. The 2021 legislative election did not cause protests. In a speech on 14 June, President Andrés Manuel López Obrador said "We must celebrate it, because we achieved our purpose: to establish in Mexico an authentic, a true democracy."

=== Political assassinations ===
The runup to the 2021 legislative election in Mexico was filled with political assassinations. More than 91 politicians were killed, 14 of them being candidates. This political violence led to the 2021 elections being labeled as the second most deadly election since the year 2000.

== Absentee voting ==
Citizens from eleven states who live overseas could vote electronically or by mail. Most of the elections were for governors, but overseas citizens registered in Mexico City, Jalisco, and Guerrero were able to vote in local legislative elections.

INE approved a pilot program allowing prison inmates held in protective custody in Hermosillo (Sonora's 4th district); Villa Comaltitlán (Chiapas's 13th); Coatlán del Río (Morelos's 4th); and Buenavista Tomatlán (Michoacán's 12th) to vote absentee from 17–19 May 2021. The original order covered only male inmates, but there were plans to extend it to certain female prisons.

== Results ==
Approximately 49 million votes were cast in the election, with a turnout of 52.7%, a 5% increase in voter participation compared to the 2015 legislative election. This was the largest midterm election in Mexican history.

The ruling coalition, Juntos Hacemos Historia, retained a 27-seat majority in the Chamber of Deputies with about 44% of the vote, but lost a significant number of seats, resulting in the loss of the two-thirds supermajority it held during the LXIV Legislature. Va por México, securing 41% of the vote, won 199 seats, increasing their representation by 52 seats. Citizens' Movement earned 23 seats, a loss of 4 compared to the previous election. No newly established party secured any seats.

Many commentators saw the election as an electoral stalemate for President Andrés Manuel López Obrador, as the ruling coalition only achieved a majority and not his desired two-thirds supermajority. Some said López Obrador might negotiate to bring his policies to fruition. Others said he could attempt to flex his executive muscle and brute force changes by using his powers as president.

Seat distribution by coalition (left) and party (right)
Party or alliance		Party-list			Constituency			Total seats	+/–
Party or alliance		Votes	%	Seats	Votes	%	Seats	Total seats	+/–
Juntos; Hacemos; Historia	Morena	16,756,189	35.30	76	16,629,905	35.27	122	198	+7
Juntos; Hacemos; Historia	Ecologist Green Party of Mexico	2,670,677	5.63	12	2,659,178	5.64	31	43	+27
Juntos; Hacemos; Historia	Labor Party	1,594,635	3.36	7	1,588,152	3.37	30	37	–24
Juntos; Hacemos; Historia	Total	21,021,501	44.28	95	20,877,235	44.28	183	278	+10
Va por México	National Action Party	8,967,785	18.89	41	8,896,470	18.87	73	114	+33
Va por México	Institutional Revolutionary Party	8,715,191	18.36	40	8,663,257	18.37	30	70	+25
Va por México	Party of the Democratic Revolution	1,792,348	3.78	8	1,785,351	3.79	7	15	–6
Va por México	Total	19,475,324	41.03	89	19,345,078	41.03	110	199	+52
Citizens' Movement		3,449,804	7.27	16	3,425,006	7.26	7	23	–4
Solidarity Encounter Party		1,352,388	2.85	0	1,344,835	2.85	0	0	–56
Force for Mexico		1,216,780	2.56	0	1,210,384	2.57	0	0	New
Progressive Social Networks		868,444	1.83	0	864,391	1.83	0	0	New
Independents		44,311	0.09	0	44,292	0.09	0	0	0
Non-registered candidates		41,925	0.09	0	41,558	0.09	0	0	0
Total		47,470,477	100.00	200	47,152,779	100.00	300	500	0
Valid votes		47,470,477	96.60		47,152,779	96.60			
Invalid/blank votes		1,673,046	3.40		1,660,363	3.40			
Total votes		49,143,523	100.00		48,813,142	100.00			
Source: DOF, INE

== Aftermath ==
=== Election night ===
At around midnight Mexico City time, the INE published its official quick count, declaring that Juntos Hacemos Historia retained a majority in the Chamber of Deputies.

=== Party registrations ===
Based on the 2021 PREP results, all three newly established parties—the Solidarity Encounter Party (PES), Progressive Social Networks (RSP), and Force for Mexico (FXM)—failed to reach the 3% threshold required to maintain their registration as national political parties. This marked the second time the PES lost its registration, having previously done so in 2018 when it was known as the Social Encounter Party. On 17 June, auditors were appointed to oversee the liquidation process for the three parties. On 30 September, the INE officially declared their loss of registration.

=== Lawsuits ===
==== Results changes ====
Due to the annulment of ballot boxes in certain districts, the results in some constituencies changed, with Juntos Hacemos Historia losing three seats and Va por México gaining three.

- Baja California Sur's 1st – Changed from María Mercedes Maciel Ortiz (Juntos Hacemos Historia) to Marco Antonio Almendáriz Puppo (Va por México).
- Mexico City's 3rd – Changed from Gabriela Jiménez Godoy (Juntos Hacemos Historia) to Wendy González Urrutia (Va por México).
- Nuevo León's 3rd – Changed from José Luis García Duque (Juntos Hacemos Historia) to Wendy Maricela Cordero González (Va por México).

== See also ==
- LXV Legislature of the Mexican Congress
- 2021 Mexican local elections
- 2021 in Mexican politics and government
- List of elections in 2021
- List of political parties in Mexico
