= Andrés Atayde Rubiolo =

Mexican politician

President of the PAN Mexico City
- In office 2018–2024

Member of the Legislative Assembly of Mexico City
- In office 2015–2018

Personal details
- Born: 1 February 1985 Mexico City, Mexico
- Party: National Action Party (PAN)
- Education: Instituto Tecnológico Autónomo de México; Universidad Panamericana
- Occupation: Politician

Andrés Atayde Rubiolo (Mexico City, February 1, 1985) is a Mexican politician, member of the National Action Party. From 2015 to 2018, he was a multi-member local deputy. He is the current president of the capital PAN.

== Biography ==
Son of Andrés Atayde Pacheco and Catalina Rubiolo (originally from Argentina), he was born into a circus family. His grandfather was one of the founders of the famous Atayde Hermanos Circus, which was founded at the end of the 19th century during the Porfiriato era in Mexico.

He studied Economics and Political Science at the Instituto Tecnológico Autónomo de México (ITAM). He also holds a Master's degree in Government and Public Policy from the Panamerican University. He is currently pursuing a Master's Degree in Business Administration at ITAM.

== Political career ==
At the age of seventeen, in 2003, he joined the ranks of the National Action Party, influenced in part by fellow PAN member and diplomat Tarcisio Navarrete.

He began his political career as a youth leader in Benito Juárez. In 2005, he worked as an advisor at Seguro Popular. Later, he was elected Regional Secretary of Youth Action from 2010 to 2013.

Between 2012 and 2015 he served as Director of Medical and Social Services in the current Benito Juárez mayor's office. After the 2015 local midterm elections, he served as local representative for the principle of proportional representation of the VII Legislature of the Legislative Assembly of the Federal District (ALDF) for the period 2015-2018.

Member of the Legislative Assembly of Mexico City

In the last legislature of the Legislative Assembly, Atayde Rubiolo chaired the Finance Committee. There, he met his counterparts Israel Betanzos and Nora Arias, current local leaders of the Institutional Revolutionary and Democratic Revolution parties.

In 2018, he was elected President of the PAN of Mexico City for the 2018-2021 triennium, succeeding Mauricio Tabe Echartea. On September 15, 2021, he reported that he requested a license as a local leader to seek his reelection as head of PAN CDMX, being reelected for one more term until 2024 after the results delivered in the 2021 election in the City.
