= Victoria Bentley Duarte =

Mexican politician and trade unionist (born 1968)

Member of the Congress of Baja California from the 3rd district
- In office 1 October 2016 – 31 July 2019
- Preceded by: Gustavo Sánchez Vásquez
- Succeeded by: María Luisa Villalobos Ávila

Personal details
- Born: 1 June 1968 (age 58) Agua Prieta, Sonora, Mexico
- Party: RSP; Morena (former); PAN (former)
- Children: 2
- Education: UABC

Victoria Bentley Duarte (born 1 July 1968) is a Mexican politician and trade unionist. She served in the XXII Legislature of the Congress of Baja California from 2016 to 2019 – initially as a member of the National Action Party before switching her affiliation to Morena – and was a candidate in the 2021 Baja California gubernatorial election for the Progressive Social Networks.

A lawyer by profession, Bentley Duarte worked for the Mexicali municipal government for many years before becoming a union leader for government employees. During her time in the state congress, she used her legal background to implement reforms to the state's legal code.

== Early life and early career ==
Bentley Duarte was born on 1 July 1968 in Agua Prieta, Sonora, later moving to Mexicali, Baja California. She attended Instituto Salvatierra, a preparatoria in Mexicali, before earning a law degree from the Autonomous University of Baja California. Bentley Duarte began working for the Mexicali municipal government legal department in 1987, where she served in several roles, including as a juez calificador (judge), legal analyst, and secretary to municipal president Guillermo Aldrete Haas. In February 2014, she was elected to a three-year term as secretary-general of the Mexicali chapter of the SUTSPEMIDBC, a public employees' union in the state of Baja California. The following month, she was also elected secretary-general of the SUTSPEMIDBC executive committee.

== Political career ==
Ahead of the 2016 state elections, Bentley Duarte was nominated by the National Action Party (PAN) as its candidate for a seat in the Congress of Baja California, representing the 3rd district. She was elected to the seat after obtaining over 40 percent of the vote, and was sworn in on 1 October 2016. Within a few days, Bentley Duarte launched a campaign in her district to promote Breast Cancer Awareness Month. That same month, she was named president of the justice committee, and also launched her Diputada en tu Colonia (representative in your neighborhood) program, where she visited a different colonia every Monday to listen to her constituents' concerns. In November 2016, Bentley Duarte inaugurated a citizen service module in Mexicali. In 2017, she proposed laws aimed at protecting victims of crime and expanding the definition of influence peddling to include actions by private individuals. Bentley Duarte continued proposing reforms to the state's penal code in 2018, such as laws combatting bribery, violent car theft, and abuse of power by public officials.

Bentley Duarte had initially expressed an interest in re-election in 2019, and even registered as a pre-candidate that January. However, she suddenly withdrew her pre-candidacy just a few days prior to the PAN's internal election in March. A few days later, Bentley Duarte renounced her affiliation with the PAN and claimed that her own party impeded her re-election efforts in favor of another internal candidate, thus declaring herself an independent legislator. A month after that, she joined the Morena party. Bentley Duarte was among the 21 state legislators who voted that July in favor of extending the term of then-incumbent Governor Jaime Bonilla Valdez – a member of Morena – from two to five years, drawing widespread criticism and starting the 2019 Baja California political crisis. The reform, dubbed the "Bonilla Law", was later struck down as unconstitutional by the Supreme Court of Mexico. Bentley Duarte later called her decision a mistake almost two years after her vote.

In January 2021, Bentley Duarte registered with the newly created Progressive Social Networks (RSP), seeking the party's nomination in the 2021 Baja California gubernatorial election. After winning the RSP nomination, she officially registered her candidacy that March. Bentley Duarte indicated that public safety would be her top priority if she were to become governor. During the campaign, she accused supporters of Morena candidate Marina del Pilar Ávila Olmeda of taking down her election materials from public view, and asked her opponents to instead encourage the populace to vote. Bentley Duarte also alleged that she was offered a bribe to withdraw from the race in favor of another candidate, Lupita Jones. She ultimately finished in seventh place (out of seven candidates), receiving about 0.99 percent of the vote as Ávila Olmeda won the governorship.

In late 2024, Bentley Duarte reappeared in Baja California politics as the leader of Grupo Unidos en la Defensa de Issstecali, an advocacy group formed to defend the rights of retired public employees, specifically regarding the protection of the State Social Security Institute (ISSSTECALI).

== Personal life ==
Bentley Duarte is married and has two children.
