= Agua Prieta =

Agua Prieta, Sonora
- City
- Agua Prieta
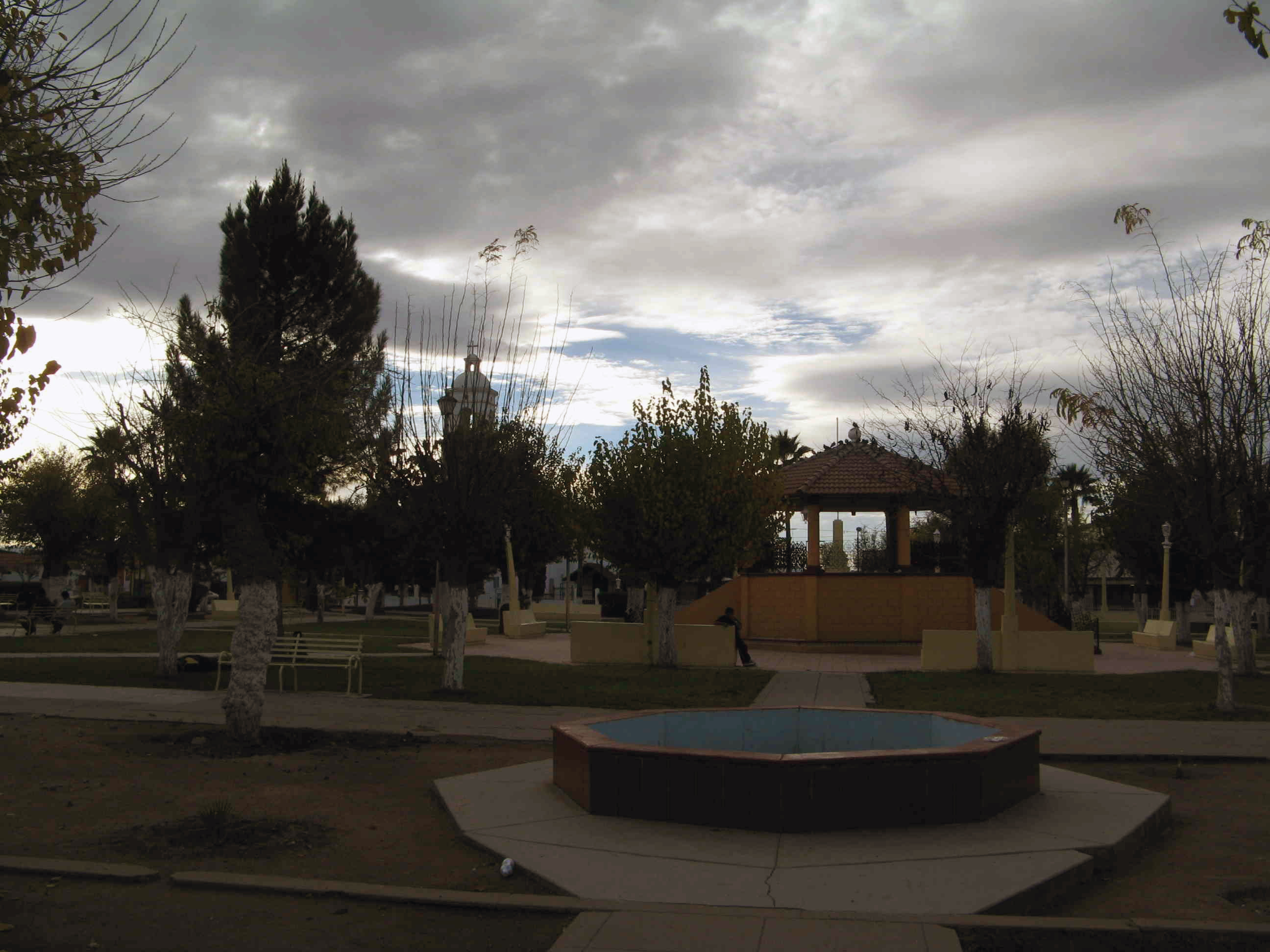

- Coat of arms

- Location within Sonora Location within Mexico
- Coordinates: 31°19′33″N 109°32′56″W
- Country: Mexico
- State: Sonora
- Municipality: Agua Prieta
- Settled: 1899
- Founded: 1903
- Incorporated: August 28, 1916
- Ascension to town status: May 8, 1933
- Ascension to city status: November 6, 1942

Government
  - Federal electoral district: Sonora's 2nd

Area
  - Total: 3,631.65 km^{2} (1,402.19 sq mi)

Population (2020)
  - Total: 91,029
- Time zone: UTC–07:00 (Zona Pacífico)
- Area code: +52 633

Agua Prieta (also known as "Bachicuy" in the native Ópata language, meaning 'Blackwater' in English) is a city in the northeastern corner of the Mexican state of Sonora. It stands on the Mexico–U.S. border, adjacent to the town of Douglas, Arizona. It serves as the municipal seat for the municipality of the same name, which covers an area of 3,631.65 km^{2} (1,402.2 sq mi). In the 2010 census, the city had a population of 79,138 people, making it the seventh-largest community in the state, with a literacy rate of 96.3%.

89% of the homes in the city have electricity, 94% have running water, and 86% are connected to the sewer system. The city is the location of the CFE Agua Prieta power plant. It is connected to the United States by the Douglas, Arizona Port of Entry, and is linked to the rest of Mexico by Federal Highways 2 and 17.

The town's name in Spanish literally means 'dark water', and it is known in the Opata language as Bachicuy.

== History ==
The city of Agua Prieta arose at the end of the 19th century as railroads were built between Douglas, Arizona, and Nacozari, Sonora, to transport minerals and goods. As a result, the first settlers of the city, then just a few blocks, were those employed by the U.S. mining company Phelps Dodge Corporation, which was based in Douglas, Arizona. One can say that the town was "founded" in 1899, but it was not until a "contract" was made in 1903 between officials and private citizens, to the name Camou, that area "pertaining" to those citizens was made a Commissary of the municipality of Fronteras. Agua Prieta did not become an independent seat of a municipality, with its current name and location, until August 28, 1916. Rodolfo L. Márquez was the new municipality's first president. It rose to the status of villa (town) on May 8, 1933, and it was "officially" placed in its current category of city relatively recently, on November 6, 1942.

== Geography ==
=== Climate ===
The climate is cold semi-arid (Köppen: BSk). In a latitude over the geographic subtropics, located in a plateau and in the interior of the continent gives a cold winter but at the same time a climatic pattern often dry and with great thermal amplitude during the day. And on the other hand the summer is very hot due to the absence of cloud cover and the air dry with average in the afternoon well above 30 °C. Most of the time there is no precipitation, but a considerable amount of rain falls between July and August.

Climate data for Agua Prieta (Infonavit 1), elevation: 1,210 metres (3,970 ft), 1951–2010 normals, extremes 1961–2016 (Note: Except snowy days and snowfall that correspond to the Bisbee Douglas International Airport, approximately 5 km to the northeast of the meteorological station of the SMN and to about 39 m. The data from the border city are from 1971 to 2000 and there are no standard combined from 1951 to 2010.)
Month	Jan	Feb	Mar	Apr	May	Jun	Jul	Aug	Sep	Oct	Nov	Dec	Year
Record high °C (°F)	30.0 (86.0)	32.0 (89.6)	35.0 (95.0)	38.0 (100.4)	42.0 (107.6)	45.0 (113.0)	44.0 (111.2)	42.0 (107.6)	41.0 (105.8)	38.0 (100.4)	36.0 (96.8)	31.0 (87.8)	45.0 (113.0)
Mean maximum °C (°F)	23.9 (75.0)	24.2 (75.6)	26.6 (79.9)	31.1 (88.0)	33.9 (93.0)	39.0 (102.2)	38.6 (101.5)	36.5 (97.7)	34.8 (94.6)	33.2 (91.8)	28.4 (83.1)	24.3 (75.7)	39.0 (102.2)
Mean daily maximum °C (°F)	16.6 (61.9)	18.7 (65.7)	22.0 (71.6)	26.1 (79.0)	30.8 (87.4)	35.6 (96.1)	35.1 (95.2)	33.6 (92.5)	31.8 (89.2)	27.5 (81.5)	21.6 (70.9)	17.0 (62.6)	26.4 (79.5)
Daily mean °C (°F)	8.0 (46.4)	9.8 (49.6)	12.9 (55.2)	16.6 (61.9)	21.1 (70.0)	25.9 (78.6)	27.2 (81.0)	26.1 (79.0)	23.6 (74.5)	18.2 (64.8)	12.2 (54.0)	8.2 (46.8)	17.5 (63.5)
Mean daily minimum °C (°F)	−0.7 (30.7)	0.9 (33.6)	3.7 (38.7)	7.0 (44.6)	11.5 (52.7)	16.2 (61.2)	19.4 (66.9)	18.6 (65.5)	15.6 (60.1)	9.0 (48.2)	2.9 (37.2)	−0.6 (30.9)	8.6 (47.5)
Mean minimum °C (°F)	−5.7 (21.7)	−5.6 (21.9)	0.4 (32.7)	3.6 (38.5)	7.7 (45.9)	12.2 (54.0)	17.3 (63.1)	15.7 (60.3)	12.9 (55.2)	5.3 (41.5)	−0.4 (31.3)	−5.0 (23.0)	−5.7 (21.7)
Record low °C (°F)	−12.5 (9.5)	−12.0 (10.4)	−9.0 (15.8)	−3.5 (25.7)	−1.0 (30.2)	2.1 (35.8)	2.0 (35.6)	10.0 (50.0)	2.0 (35.6)	−4.0 (24.8)	−8.5 (16.7)	−19.5 (−3.1)	−19.5 (−3.1)
Average precipitation mm (inches)	19.9 (0.78)	17.1 (0.67)	10.6 (0.42)	6.3 (0.25)	5.2 (0.20)	12.2 (0.48)	90.4 (3.56)	81.4 (3.20)	41.6 (1.64)	23.4 (0.92)	19.0 (0.75)	28.1 (1.11)	355.2 (13.98)
Average snowfall cm (inches)	0.51 (0.2)	0.25 (0.1)	0.25 (0.1)	0 (0)	0 (0)	0 (0)	0 (0)	0 (0)	0 (0)	0 (0)	0.25 (0.1)	0.76 (0.3)	2.02 (0.8)
Average precipitation days (≥ 0.1 mm)	3.5	3.3	2.1	1.6	1.3	2.0	11.2	9.3	5.2	2.7	2.7	3.9	48.8
Average snowy days (≥ 0.1 in)	0.3	0.2	0.1	0	0	0	0	0	0	0	0.1	0.3	1
Source 1: SMN
Source 2: NOAA (snow days)

== Culture ==
Los Apson was one of the most successful musical bands during the second half of the 60s; all original members originated from (A)gua (P)rieta, (Son)ora, hence their name. They led the phenomenon known in Mexico as the "northern invasion". Along with the British influence, Los Apson was one of the main decisive elements that brought new nuances to the Mexican musical movement.

== Sports ==
The main sport in Agua Prieta is baseball, closely followed by soccer and basketball. Agua Prieta's professional baseball team is the Toros de Agua Prieta. In 2012, Agua Prieta had its first ever Olympian when Luis Alberto Rivera represented Mexico in the long jump at the XXX Olympic Games in London.

== Economy ==
Agua Prieta II is the first integrated solar combined cycle (ISCC) power plant in Mexico – one of the first power plants of its type in the world – and it is being equipped with the SPPA-E3000 low-voltage switchgear solution from Siemens Mexico Energy. Agua Prieta II is a combined-cycle power plant (CCPP) that has been extended with a solar field and parabolic trough collectors. In this type of power plant, the steam generated by the solar field is fed into the water-steam cycle of the CCPP to increase steam turbine output and reduce carbon dioxide emissions. The power plant in Mexico will have an output of approximately 465 Megawatts (MW) with a contribution from the solar field of 12 MW, it will supply electricity to northwest Mexico. The end customer is the Mexican state power provider Comisión Federal de Electricidad, which already operates two plants of the same type in Morocco and Algeria.

Agua Prieta is home to several maquiladoras, including Levolor, Commercial Vehicle Group, Joyson Safety Systems, Velcro, Standex-Meder Electronics, and Alstyle Apparel & Activewear (Gildan).

== Politics ==
Agua Prieta played an important role in the Mexican Revolution. Plutarco Elías Calles and Lázaro Cárdenas, two future presidents of Mexico, both lived in the town during its early years. In 1914, the Hotel Central, a now-demolished hotel in the center of the city, was the seat of Carranza's constitutional government. In 1915, Pancho Villa made a night attack on Agua Prieta that was repelled by the forces of Plutarco Elías Calles, assisted by large searchlights (possibly powered by American electricity).

The Plan de Agua Prieta, a manifesto that called for the rejection of the government headed by Venustiano Carranza, was signed in a curiosity shop near the international border on 23 April 1920. by the governor of Sonora, Adolfo de la Huerta, and Plutarco Elías Calles in support of Álvaro Obregón, with the principal objective of bringing an end to Carranza's presidency, who was forced to flee Mexico City and was killed a month later. The Plan of Agua Prieta used as its political banner the 1917 Constitution, with which Carranza had not complied. It also advocated the convening of elections, appointed Huerta as supreme commander of the Constitutionalist Army, and dictated the rules for electing a provisional president, resulting in Huerta being named president by Congress in June.

=== List of mayors ===
- 1952–1954 Jesús Siqueiros PRI
- 1964–1967 Antonio B. Loreto Barthelemy PRI
- 1979–1982 Luis Córdova Corrales PAN
- 1982–1985 Leonardo Yáñez Vargas PAN
- 1985–1988 Bernardino Meza Ortíz PRI
- 1988–1991 Baudelio Vildósola Teran PRI
- 1991–1994 Bernardino Ibarrola Serrano PRI
- 1994–1997 Óscar Ochoa Patrón PAN
- 1997–2000 Vicente Terán Uribe PRI
- 2000–2003 Irma Villalobos Rascón PRI
- 2003–2006 David Figueroa Ortega PAN
- 2006–2009 Antonio Cuadras PRI
- 2009–2012 Vicente Terán Uribe PSD
- 2012 (March – September) Francisco Javier Carrera Hernandez PRI
- 2012–2015 Irma Villalobos Rascón PRI
- 2015–2018 Héctor David Rubalcava Gastélum PAN
- 2018–2021 Jesús Alfonso Montaño Durazo Morena
- 2021–2024 Jesús Alfonso Montaño Durazo Morena
- 2024– José Manuel Quijada Lamadrid Morena PVEM PT PNA Sonora PES Sonora

== Notable people ==
- Los Apson, early 1960s rock band named for the town (Agua Prieta SONora)
- Victoria Bentley Duarte, politician
- Zarela Martínez, New York City-based Mexican restaurateur and cookbook author

== See also ==
- San Bernardino, Sonora
