= 2021 in Mexican politics and government =

Events pertaining to 2021 in Mexican politics and government.

== Monthly events ==
=== January ===
- January 1
  - The minimum wage is increased 15% to MXN $123.22 generally and MXN $185.56 along the northern border.
  - Single-use plastics are banned in Mexico City (CDMX).
- January 2
  - Governor Carlos Mendoza Davis PAN of Baja California Sur vetoes the 2021 state budget.
  - The farm lobby criticizes Andrés Manuel López Obrador's decision to ban genetically modified corn, and organic farmers praise it as a move that should protect smaller farmers.
- January 4 – President López Obrador offers political asylum to WikiLeaks founder Julian Assange, who is in the United Kingdom pending extradition to the United States for trial on espionage charges.
- January 5 – Tatiana Clouthier Carrillo becomes Secretary of Economy (SE) nearly a month after being named to the post.
- January 11 – The Instituto Nacional Electoral (National Electoral Institute, INE) rules that President López Obrador′s daily press conferences (Mañaneras) are political propaganda and have to end on April 4 when campaigning begins. Exceptions can be made in cases of public health (including the pandemic), education, and civil protection.
- January 12
  - Restaurant owners in Mexico City, the State of Mexico, hold cacerolazos (protest involving the beating of kitchen utensils) against the closure of restaurants. 13,500 restaurants in Mexico City and 10,000 in the State of Mexico have closed since the beginning of the pandemic. Restaurants and similar establishments are believed to be where virus spread occurs most readily.
  - Juan Antonio Acosta Cano, deputy in Congress of Guanajuato (PAN) and pre-candidate for municipal president of Santa Cruz de Juventino Rosas) is assassinated.
- January 13 – President López Obrador introduces plans to eliminate private prisons. The government pays an average MXN$3,500 (USD$177) per day for each prisoner.
- January 14 – President López Obrador promises to protect free speech against blockage by social media outlets.
- January 15 – INE approves the electoral coalitions Va Por México (PAN PRI PRD) and Juntos hacemos historia (MORENA PT PVEM).
- January 16 – Facebook puts a warning on a post where Cardinal Juan Sandoval Iñiguez (Roman Catholic Archdiocese of Guadalajara, 1994-2011) lies about the COVID-19 vaccines.
- January 18
  - Ricardo Anaya (PAN) announces his candidacy for president in 2024.
  - Foreign Policy reported that former ambassador Roberta S. Jacobson would be in charge of Mexico–United States border affairs at the National Security Council under President Joe Biden.
- January 20
  - President López Obrador calls upon President Joe Biden to quickly resolve migration issues for Mexicans living in the United States, including the granting of dual nationality.
  - Christopher Landau ends his term as United States Ambassador to Mexico.
- January 22
  - U.S. President Joe Biden makes his first two official telephone calls to foreign leaders to Canadian Prime Minister Justin Trudeau and Mexican President Andrés Manuel López Obrador. Biden and López Obrador discuss immigration, COVID-19, and other topics.
  - Twitter blocks several accounts related to the Fourth Transformation because they broke rules related to spam.
- January 24 – President López Obrador announces he has a mild symptom of COVID-19. Interior Secretary Olga Sánchez Cordero will take over for him in his daily news conferences.
- January 25 – Deputy Gerardo Fernández Noroña (PT) apologizes to Adriana Dávila Fernández (PAN) regarding a comment he made in 2019 suggesting she had links to organized crime.
- January 26
  - Environmental groups led by the Global Alliance for Alternatives to Incineration (GAIA) demand that Mexico comply with the Basel Convention on the Control of Transboundary Movements of Hazardous Wastes and Their Disposal in relation to the importation of dangerous plastic waste. SEMARNAT reported the importation of 8,312,812 tons of plastic waste between 2013 and August 2020 (90% from the United States), and a 29% increase of imports from January to August 2020.
  - Senator Lilly Téllez (PAN) criticizes the government for its acquisition of 24 million doses of Sputnik V COVID-19 vaccine from Russia. The Russian embassy refuted charges that the vaccine is of poor quality, and Morena MORENA demanded an apology.
- January 29 – Authorities removed 150 empty tents from the Zócalo of Mexico City that had been installed as a protest in November 2020. Ten people were injured.
- January 31 – Hundreds, mostly women, march to demand justice for Mariana Sánchez Dávalos, a young doctor whose body was recently found in Nueva Palestina, Ocosingo, Chiapas. Marches took place in Tuxtla Gutiérrez, San Cristóbal de las Casas, and Tapachula.

=== February ===
- February 3
  - The National Electoral Institute (INE) issues a statement saying that it is not prudent to postpone the June 6, 2021 Mexican legislative election and doing so could even trigger a constitutional crisis by delaying the LXV Legislature of the Mexican Congress.
  - INE approves a pilot program allowing some inmates held in preventative prison to vote in the June 6 elections.
- February 6 – Leopoldo Maldonado Gutiérrez, director of Artículo 19, an organization dedicated to freedom of expression, denounces the publication of a modified cartoon by Rafael Pineda, ″Rapé″, in the official government Twitter account as ″manipulation of information″. ″Rapé″ noted that he had not authorized the publication of the altered image, which showed President López Obrador as a baseball player hitting a home run by defeating the SARS-CoV-2 virus. The tweet was taken down.
- February 9 – In response to a petition by Enrique Krauze, Héctor Aguilar Camín, José Woldenberg, and other intellectuals that infrastructure projects be put on hold to pay for COVID-19 vaccines, López Obrador noted that Mexico has already appropriated MXN $32 billion for that purpose; combined with healthy finances, this is more than sufficient.
- February 16
  - Esteban Moctezuma takes the oath of office as Ambassador to the United States.
  - The Instituto Nacional de Migración (National Migration Institute, INM) has arrested 1,189 people, 30% of them minors, in fifty operations in the last three weeks for illegal immigration. Most were headed for the United States.
- February 18
  - Former president Vicente Fox criticizes President López Obrador′s call for energy savings following massive power outages.
  - Calls increase for MORENA to withdraw the candidacy of Félix Salgado Mecedonio for governor of Guerrero.
- February 22
  - The Auditoría Superior de la Federación (Superior Auditor of the Federation, ASF) says it has found a number of irregularities and deficiencies in the Secretariat of the Civil Service (SFP), the branch of the government that is supposed to crack down on corruption, since 2019. The audit says closing the Mexico City Texcoco Airport (NAIM) cost MXN $232 billion more than estimated in April 2019. López Obrador said, ″I have other data.″
  - The government gives Pemex a USD $3.54 billion subsidy.
  - Argentine President Alberto Fernández begins an official visit.
- February 23 – Alfonso Ramírez Cuéllar, former leader of MORENA, proposes a wealth tax based on the Argentine model.
- February 26 – MORENA withdraws its support for Félix Salgado Macedonio, candidate for governor of Guerrero but declares he is innocent of charges of sex abuse and rape.

=== March ===
- March 1 – President López Obrador and U.S. President Joe Biden hold a virtual summit, where they discuss vaccination, migration, security issues, the economy, and energy.
- March 5 – Political campaigns begin.
- March 7 – Families and other demonstrators cover a metal barrier erected to protect the National Palace with signs, photographs, and flowers in memory of women who have been victims of violence.
- March 8
  - Metal walls measuring 3 m (9.8 ft) installed in Mexico City′s Zócalo to protect historic buildings are turned into a shrine on International Women's Day. Demonstrators also express their rejection of Felix Salgado as a candidate for governor of Guerrero. The Hidalgo metro station was closed until further notice because of demonstrations.
  - Police hunt down demonstrators in Aguascalientes after violence breaks out. Thirty women, including a 13-year-old girl, plus three men are arrested from a crowd of 6,000. There are demonstrations in every state.
  - Estefanía Veloz, commentator of the program De Buena Fe on Canal Once of the Instituto Politécnico Nacional (IPN), resigns from MORENA due to the candidacy of Felix Salgado Macedonio in Guerrero.
- March 9 – President López Obrador endorses the feminist cause but says the crowd in the Zócalo on March 8 was small due to violence backed by conservatives.
- March 10
  - Josefina Vázquez Mota, presidential candidate for PAN in 2012, accuses former presidents Fox (2000-2006) and Calderon (2006-2012) of gender violence.
  - NGOs criticize feminists who particiapate in violent demonstrations. Mujeres Libres y Soberanas said, ″No podemos reclamar derechos generando violencia, porque de esa forma se originan más asperezas″ (″We cannot claim rights by generating violence, because that originates more roughness″). Verónica Camargo of #NiUnaMenos, said, ″No me siento representada cuando una mujer reclama con odio, violencia e ira″ (″I do not feel represented when a woman complains with hatred, violence and anger″).
- March 15 – A group of demonstratorts shout down Claudia Sheinbaum in downtown Mexico City, demanding release of 139 motorcyclists arrested on March 5 in Tepito.
- March 22 – Members of the Frente de Pueblos en Defensa del Agua y la Tierra de Morelos, Puebla y Tlaxcala (″People′s Front in Defense of Water and Land of Morelos, Puebla and Tlaxcala″) protest on World Water Day to demand that the government guarantee that water from the Cuautla River not be used for the Morelos Integral Project (PIM) thermoelectric plant of the Federal Electricity Commission (CFE).
- March 24 – Bolivian President Luis Alberto Arce Catacora arrives for an official visit.
- March 25
  - AMLO appeals to the Electoral Court of the Federal Judicial Branch to block a ruling by the Instituto Nacional Electoral to prevent MORENA from achieving a majority in the Chamber of Deputies.
  - Accompanied by Bolivian President Luis Alberto Arce Catacora, AMLO pays homage to 504 years of indigenous resistance to colonialism by the inhabitants of Chakán Putum, Campeche.
- March 29
  - Salvadoran President Nayib Bukele demands justice for Victoria Salazar, a Salvadoran immigrant murdered by police in Tulum.
  - Seven Mexican soldiers are being held in La Esperanza, Tacaná, San Marcos Department, Guatemala, after a 30-year-old Guatemalan was killed in Mazapa de Madero, Chiapas. The incident is being investigated as a murder.
- March 30 – The United States Department of State calls fake news attacks by Sanjuana Martínez, director of Notimex, on ″Artículo 19″ and ″Signa Lab″ an attack on human rights. AMLO defends Martínez and points out that censorship does not exist in Mexico.

=== April ===
- April 4 – Campaigns for governor officially begin in Baja California, Baja California Sur, Chihuahua, Zacatecas, Nayarit, Sinaloa, Michoacán, Querétaro, and Tlaxcala.
- April 22 – Mexico participates in the Earth Day world summit on climate change convoked by U.S. president Joe Biden.

=== June ===
- June 6
  - 2021 Mexican gubernatorial elections – Preliminary results from INE give MORENA or allies eleven states, PAN two, PVEM and MC one each. The big loser was PRI, which controlled eight governorships before the election.
  - 2021 Mexican legislative election – Preliminary results from INE indicate that MORENA and its allies (PT and PVEM) received an absolute majority (50% + 1) but not the 2/3 required to amend the Constitution. Morena won about 197 seats on its own and PAN won about 111 seats, not including its allies PRI and PRD.
  - 2021 Mexican local elections
    - 2021 Coahuila elections
- June 9 – U.S. vice president Kamala Harris meets with AMLO to discuss immigration.

== Scheduled and anticipated events ==
- August 21 – 2021 Mexican corruption trial referendum

== History by government agency ==
Note: This section is provided for updates by government body or agency in a narrative format.

=== Banxico ===
See Banking and finance below.

=== Federal Electric Commission ===
The Federal Electric Commission (CFE) has come under scrutiny after massive blackouts on December 30, 2020, and related to the February 13–17, 2021 North American winter storm. The MRN party proposed reforming the Electricity Industry Law to the Congress of the Union. The proposal would reverse the energy reform approved under former president Peña Nieto. There are four priorities: 1) hydroelectric energy, 2) other energy produced by CFE (nuclear, geothermal, thermoelectric, and combined cycle gas turbines), 3) wind and solar energy produced by individuals, and 4) other. CFE contends that subsidies to renewable energy ″bleed″ billions of pesos. Critics say the proposed law is an attack on private industry and would violate both the Paris Agreement and the United States–Mexico–Canada Agreement.

The reform was passed and published in the Diario Oficial de la Federación on March 9, 2021, but a judge suspended it at the request of ″Parque Solar Orejana″ on March 10. President López Obrador called for an investigation.

== History by issue ==
Note: This section is provided for issue-based overviews in narrative format.

=== Banking and finance ===
On December 14, 2020, the government introduced proposed changes to allow the Bank of Mexico (Banxico) to make it capture U.S. dollars in cash. Cynically called the Ley Monreal, because of its support by Senator Ricardo Monreal MORENA, critics worry it will lead to an increase in money laundering and decrease the bank's autonomy. Further, Gabriel Casillas, president of the Comité de Estudios Económicos del Instituto Mexicano de Ejecutivos de Finanzas ("Committee of Economic Studies of the Mexican Institute of Finance Executives″, IMEF) says the primary beneficiary of the law will be Banco Azteca, owned by billionaire Ricardo Salinas Pliego. This is because Banco Azteca receives large quantities of dollars sent to families by Mexican expatriates living in the United States, but the bank does not have formal ties with an American banking institution.

Debate on the bill was postponed until January 2021. On January 21 President Lopez Obrador announced that he opposed a provision supported by Banco Azteca that would make it easier for banks to sell excess U.S. dollars to Banixco, although he said that the problem of excessive fees charged for sending money from the United to familities in Mexico persists.

=== Legalization of Marijuana ===
After the Supreme Court (SCJN) ruled in 2018 that prohibition of cannabis (marijuana) was unconstitutional, the legislature was given until December 15, 2020 to approve a new law. The Senate approved a law regulating cultivation, distribution, production, sale, and use of marijuana on November 19, 2020, but the Chamber of Deputies was unable to reach an agreement and the deadline was extended to February 2021.

Javier Molina, analyst of the investment firm eToro, notes that legalization of recreational marijuana will increase tax collection, but Alfredo Neme, representative of the National Cannabis Council (CCN), warns that the bill was written will be a boon for large pharmaceutical companies and leaves out public-private associations. New Frontier, an organization that analyzes legal marijuana markets estimates the Mexican market at 2.3 million consumers with a value of USD $3.2 billion (MXN $65.4 billion). Neme said there is a potential investment of USD $6 to $10 billion in investment from 40 companies, which would also boost the creation of formal jobs. The Chamber of Deputies approved recreational, medical, and scientific marijuana use on March 10, 2021, with a vote of 316-129. Recreational marijuana would be reserved for individuals over 18 who must register for its use.

Legalization of poppy growing for medicinal purposes is also being considered.

=== Elections ===
The July 2021 Mexican legislative election promises to be a battle between PAN, PRI, and PRD on one hand vs. MORENA and PANAL on the other.

President Andrés Manuel López Obrador has proposed referendums on his progress since 2018 and on criminal trials of his predecessors Enrique Peña Nieto, Felipe Calderón, Vicente Fox, Ernesto Zedillo, and Carlos Salinas de Gortari.

== See also ==
- Government of Mexico
- Politics of Mexico
  - Fourth Transformation
- Years in Mexico
- Timeline of Mexican history
- 2021 in politics and government
- 2020s

=== Specific situations and issues ===
- COVID-19 pandemic in Mexico
- Feminism in Mexico
  - Violence against women in Mexico
- Crime in Mexico
  - Mexican drug war
    - List of journalists and media workers killed in Mexico
    - List of politicians killed in the Mexican drug war
