= Alfa González Magallanes =

Mexican politician

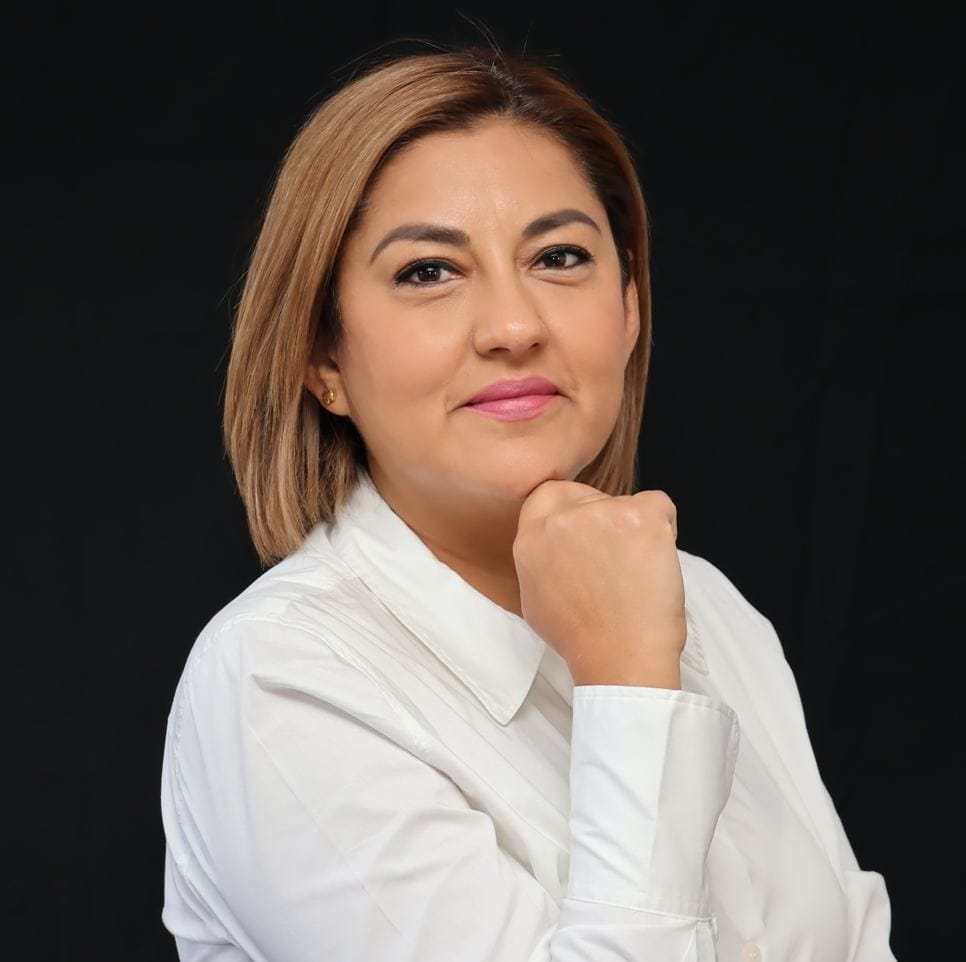
- Born: 28 May 1981 (age 44); Saltillo, Coahuila, Mexico
- Occupation: Politician
- Political party: PRD

Alfa González Magallanes (born 28 May 1981) is a Mexican politician affiliated with the Party of the Democratic Revolution (PRD). She served as the mayor of Tlalpan, a borough of Mexico City, from 2021 to 2024.

== Life ==
González was born in Saltillo, Coahuila, and obtained her undergraduate law degree from the Universidad Autónoma de Coahuila in 2003. By then, she had already started her career in politics, serving as the president of the PRD in Coahuila from 2002 to 2003. She unsuccessfully ran for a seat in the Congress of Coahuila in 2008, and after the loss, she served as an advisor to the PRD representatives in the Federal Electoral Institute (IFE) and as a member of the PRD's National Electoral Commission.

From 2012 to 2015, González was a federal deputy to the 62nd Congress, representing Coahuila from the second electoral region. She held positions as secretary on the commissions for Justice and Oversight of the Superior Auditor of the Federation and sat on four others. While in the Chamber of Deputies, she obtained a master's degree in law from the UNAM.

After her time in San Lázaro, González's political career shifted focus from Coahuila to Mexico City. She became the head of the Directorate General of Land Use Regularization for the city, serving in that post for four years. The next year, she graduated with another master's degree, in public administration, from the Universidad Anáhuac. She then took a PRD party post in Mexico City.

González ran in 2018 as a Por México al Frente coalition candidate for mayor of Tlalpan. That bid was unsuccessful, but she tried again in 2021, being put forward as the Va por México coalition candidate. Her second attempt was successful, as she won with 41.29 percent of the vote.
