= Fourth Transformation =

Campaign promise of Mexican president Andrés Manuel López Obrador

The Fourth Transformation (Spanish: Cuarta Transformación) is Mexican President Andrés Manuel López Obrador's (commonly known as "AMLO") 2018 campaign promise to do away with "privileged abuses", namely those of previous decades' high government officials. López Obrador defined the first three transformations as the Mexican War of Independence (1810–1821), the Reform War (1858–1861) and the Mexican Revolution (1910–1917).

Obrador's term "privileged abuses" mainly refers to the high salaries and luxurious lifestyles of high government officials, which were seen as "abuses" in the context of a high poverty level in Mexico. López Obrador aimed to lower salaries for not only the president but also Cabinet members and high-level bureaucrats, justices of the Supreme Court (SCJN), legislators, and members of independent agencies such as the electoral commission (INE) and the census office (INEGI). In addition to salaries, López Obrador mentioned luxury vehicles including airplanes and helicopters; expensive private health insurance in addition to the program for government officials (ISSSTE); expense accounts for bodyguards, gasoline, cell phones, and food; and a lack of transparency.

== Definition ==
"Based on what we have achieved, we will seek to undertake a peaceful and orderly transformation, yes, but no less profound than Independence, the Reformation, and the Revolution; we have not made all this effort for mere cosmetic changes, by far, and much less to stay with more of the same." — Andrés Manuel López Obrador

In a speech given at the end of his campaign for president, López Obrador outlined the meaning of the Fourth Transformation. He called for a nation of laws wherein nothing is outside the law and no one is above the law. He said the security services would be reformed so that no one was spied upon and religion, ideas, and the right to dissent would be respected. AMLO called for a true democracy guaranteeing free elections and prison for electoral fraud. He called for an end of corruption and said the law should apply not only to government officials but also to their families. He said he would reform the Constitution so that even the president could be prosecuted for corruption. He called for a popular consultation process after three years to determine whether the president should be recalled. He insisted that luxuries, such as high salaries for government officials, the presidential airplane and official residence, bodyguards, and presidential pensions should be cut or eliminated.

AMLO also called for increased attention to the needs of rural communities, revitalization of the construction industry, improvements in the energy sector, pensions for elderly Mexicans, free medicine, and improved education with access for all.

Forbes Mexico, in a September 2018 article said that the Fourth Transformation presents an opportunity for Mexico to move forward as a true democracy. It could not depend on one political party and must move beyond campaign slogans. The authors, Nicola Morfini and Bernardo Sainz Martínez of the Pan American Institute for High Business Management (IPADE), argue that Mexico is at a crossroads: the large margin of victory by Juntos Haremos Historia in the 2018 election makes true change possible while also highlighting the possibility of regression. They warn that if decision-making depends exclusively on National Regeneration Movement (Morena), the legislature could lose power as it did under the Institutional Revolutionary Party (PRI). Given the high poverty levels in the country, the authors suggest that popular democracy may be easily manipulated. They point out that many members of Morena were once members of PRI, which should have a moderating effect on political changes. Finally, they conclude that the future of Mexico depends on everyone.

== Background: the first three transformations ==
President Lopez Obrador cites three previous periods of transformation in history of Mexico: the Independence Movement (1810-1821), La Reforma (1858-1861), and the Mexican Revolution (1910-1917). While all three events involved extreme violence, AMLO insists that the fourth transformation be peaceful.

=== Mexican War of Independence ===
After nearly 300 years of Spanish colonization, on the morning of September 16, 1810, Catholic priest Miguel Hidalgo called the people of Dolores Hidalgo to take up arms against their Spanish overlords. Hidalgo took up a banner of the Virgin of Guadalupe. After a few battles, Hidalgo had gathered a ragtag, disorganized army of 80,000. Hidalgo's army was eventually defeated, and Hidalgo was defrocked and beheaded. His chief collaborator, Ignacio Allende was also captured and beheaded.

Hidalgo's disciple, Father José María Morelos took up the struggle, winning 22 battles in nine months. Morelos convened the Congress of Chilpancingo, which declared independence, abolished slavery and the caste system, and declared Catholicism the state religion. However, Morelos soon was defeated, caught, and executed.

For five years, the insurgents were confined mostly to guerrilla warfare, led by Guadalupe Victoria near Puebla and Vicente Guerrero in the mountains of Oaxaca. By 1819, the Spanish viceroy, Juan Ruiz de Apodaca was able to report that the situation was under control.

Events in Spain led to a weakening of the crown, With Guerrero, he wrote the Plan of Iguala. Iturbide, Guerrero, and Victoria marched on Mexico City; on September 27, 1821, they defeated the Spanish and Mexico consolidated its independence.

Iturbide became emperor of the new nation, but three years later he was deposed and a republic was established with Guadalupe Victoria as its first president.

=== Reform War ===
La Reforma (the Reform) was a liberal movement led by Benito Juárez in 1857 to disestablish the power of the Catholic Church; establish separation of Church and State; reduce the power of the military; and establish civil registry of births, marriages, and deaths. Conservatives fought back, leading to the War of Reform (1858-1861). The liberals won the war, but the war left the country weak, and it was soon followed by the French intervention, and the establishment of the Second Mexican Empire with Maximilian I of Austria as emperor (1864-1867). Juarez and the liberals retook power in 1867.

=== Mexican Revolution ===
After an unsuccessful electoral campaign against President and dictator Porfirio Díaz, on November 20, 1910, Francisco I. Madero called the Mexican people to arms. In 30 years of rule, Diaz had modernized the country and established a growing economy, but he had done so by granting numerous concessions to British and American investors while denying basic liberties to peasant farmers, miners, and workers. In a bad year, such as 1908–1909, the peasants were reduced to virtual slavery. Within six months of Madero's call to arms, Diaz had resigned and the moderate, middle-class Madero became president.

Madero's moderate reforms were not satisfactory to peasant leaders such as Pancho Villa in the north and Emiliano Zapata in the south. Fighting continued, and full warfare broke out. Madero was overthrown by the army and assassinated in early 1913 by Victoriano Huerta, who after thirteen months of harsh rule and fierce fighting was overthrown and executed. There were numerous small bands led by local warlords; eventually, many of them gave up while others united under Venustiano Carranza. Carranza was able to consolidate his power, and on February 5, 1917, he published the Constitution of 1917, which many see as the end of the Mexican Revolution. However, fighting continued well into the 1920s.

== Major acts and affairs ==
A year after the election and seven months since he took office, President López Obrador stated that he had fulfilled 78 of the 100 promises he had made, including ending the Drug War. He also said that the state has stopped being the principal human rights violator. He promised to end corruption and admitted that there is still a lot of work to do in questions of the economy, health, and public safety.

=== Infrastructure ===
President Lopez Obrador announced an MXN $859 billion (US$44 billion) investment plan for 147 infrastructure projects in November 2019. The investments are in highways, railways, ports, and airports as well as investments in telecommunications with most of the capital coming from the private sector. "This is of the highest importance," said Lopez Obrador. "Participation of the private sector in the country’s growth is necessary."

Priority energy projects are the coking plant in Tula, Hidalgo (MXN $40 billion), the refinery in Cadereyta, Nuevo León (MXN $17 billion), and the Pemex Gas Processing Complex to the Mayakán pipeline in Macuspana, Tabasco (MXN $1 billion). MXN $219 is destined for the port of Topolobampo, Sinaloa and the port in Lázaro Cárdenas, Michoacán is scheduled to receive MXN $41 million. MXN $14,152 is earmarked for 15 airport improvements, particularly in Cancun and Merida. An MXN $86.161 million investment is expected from telecommunications companies. Thirty-three projects may begin in 2020 with an investment of MXN $78 billion—other airport investments, railroads, highways, a new hospital for Torreón, Coahuila, and other energy projects. Fourteen projects worth MXN $21.356 billion (US$14 million), including the expansion of the Cuautitlán-Huehuetoca train in the State of Mexico, are planned for 2021.

==== Construction of a new airport for Mexico City ====
During the 2018 campaign for president, Andrés Manuel López Obrador opposed the construction of the Mexico City Texcoco Airport (NAIM), the principal infrastructure project of President Enrique Peña Nieto. AMLO complained about costs, corruption, and environmental concerns such as unstable soil on the bed of Lake Texcoco. He said it would be better to convert the military base of Santa Lucia in Zumpango, State of Mexico, to civilian use.

Ending the Texcoco project was highly controversial so after winning the election Lopez Obrador decided to submit the proposal to the people of Mexico. A popular consultation was held across the country, from October 25–28, 2018. The option to convert the Santa Lucia airport to civilian use and to improve the existing Benito Juárez International Airport and Toluca International Airports won with 69.95% of the votes: 748,335 for Santa Lucia and 311,132 in favor of Texcoco. The NAIM debt ran into MXN $105 billion (US$5.6 billion) when it was paid off in July 2019.

Conversion of the airport in Zumpango, which was renamed General Felipe Ángeles Airport, began on October 18, 2019. It has two runways for civilian use and one for military use and it was inaugurated despite not being complete on March 21, 2022.

==== Maya train ====
The Maya Train project, first proposed in September 2018, is a 1,525-kilometer (948-mile) railroad that will traverse the Yucatán Peninsula in the hopes of boosting tourism and boost the economy in one of the most marginalized areas of the country. The US $6.2-billion project was approved by 92.3% of the voters who participated in the December 14–15, 2019 referendum. Critics worry about environmental effects, threats to local indigenous cultures, and economic benefits that will include communities that do not have one of the 18 stops along the route. Another concern is that construction seems to be rushed in the hope of finishing before the end of AMLO's term in 2024. The Zapatista Army of National Liberation (EZLN) promises to resist construction of the train, and the Mexico office of the United Nations High Commissioner for Human Rights (ONU-DH) has criticized the consultation process, saying it fell short of international standards. Giovanna Gasparello of the National Institute of Anthropology and History (INAH) points out that there no studies linking the project and development have been published. 93% of the 100,940 people who voted in the referendum supported the project, but they represent only 2.86% of the 3,526,000 registered voters.

=== Energy ===
Fuel theft from pipelines owned by Pemex, has been a long-term problem in Mexico, with a loss to the government of between MXN $15 and $20 billion (US$820 million to US$1.09 billion) every year. When President Andrés Manuel López Obrador took office in December 2018, he launched a campaign against huachicoleros and dispatched close to 5,000 troops from the Armed Forces and the Federal Police to guard pipelines across Mexico. The plan began on December 21, 2018, and involved closing and monitoring pipelines, particularly in the states of Puebla, Guanajuato, Jalisco, and the State of México. It soon led to fuel shortages in the west and center of the country, despite the dispatch of numerous fuel trucks to supply local gas stations. Tragically, it also led to the Tlahuelilpan pipeline explosion on January 18 that caused 137 deaths. A memorial for the victims was built in 2020, and each family affected was granted MXN $15,000 (US$800) in compensation.

Andrés Manuel López Obrador was a leading voice against privatization of Pemex throughout the 2010s, and he emphasized that point once elected. As president he canceled contracts with private companies.

In a speech in Merida, Yucatan in February 2020, Lopez Obrador said that his policies had saved Pemex from bankruptcy. He promised to review the pensions for retired employees of the Federal Electricity Commission (CFE), inaugurated construction of gas pipelines (Cuxtal II and the Central Ciclo Combinado Mérida), and promised to build thermoelectric plants in Merida and Cancun. He also reminded his audience about the oil refinery that is being built in Dos Bocas, Tabasco, the first new refinery in forty years.

On February 28, 2020, Pemex released figures showing an increase in production and a decrease in debt. They say huachicol has decreased by 90%.

=== Corruption ===
61% of the population say that the government of Andrés Manuel López Obrador is acting "well" or "very well" against corruption, according to the Global Corruption Barometer 2019, compared to 24% who considered that of Enrique Peña Nieto's government in 2017. However, Eduardo Bohórquez, director of the watchdog group Transparencia Mexicana warns of "hyperpolitization" of corruption and compares the treatment of Rosario Robles with that of Carlos Lomelí Bolaños and their alleged roles in the Estafa Maestra (Master Scam).

While AMLO has emphasized the fight against corruption, many people worry that that does not include ranking members of the Mexican Armed Forces.

=== Crime and violence ===
As a candidate, Andrés Manuel López Obrador offered to remove the military from the streets; two weeks before taking office he released his Plan Nacional de Paz y Seguridad ("National Plan for Peace and Security"), calling for legalization of some drugs, an eventual disarming of criminal gangs, and the creation of a National Guard under the control of the Secretariat of National Defense (SEDENA). The National Guard was officially launched in July 2019, despite the opposition of groups such as Human Rights Watch.

One part of the plan proposes special laws for transitional justice similar to those found in countries that have been at war. Another strategy is to treat drug use as a health problem and to legalize the cultivation and use of marijuana. An Amnesty law for minor drug offenders continues to be a priority for the 2020 legislative session. La Unión Nacional de Padres de Familia ("The National Union of Parents of Families") insists this would be counterproductive.

Ten months into 2019, the results do not look promising. 28,741 intentional homicides and 833 femicides were committed in the first ten months of the year, (average 95 per day) 706 more than in January–October 2019.

Among the most notorious cases was the ambush-murder of 13 police officers in El Aguaje, Michoacán by the Jalisco New Generation Cartel on October 15, 2019. Two days later, on October 17, the police and National Guard botched an attempted arrest and extradition of Ovidio Guzmán López of the Sinaloa Cartel in Culiacán. Heavily armed men attacked various parts of the city, including an apartment complex housing the relatives of military personnel and the local airport, killing fourteen people before Guzmán López was released by the police. AMLO said he supported the release of Guzmán López, saying "This decision was taken to protect citizens... We do not want deaths. We do not want war." Three weeks after that, three women and six children, members of the LeBarón family, were massacred en route to a wedding in Le Barón, Galeana, Chihuahua, 70 miles south of the U.S.-Mexico border. All nine victims were dual Mexican-American citizens, prompting U.S. President Donald Trump to threaten to declare Mexican drug cartels "terrorists" which would give him the authorization to attack them, violating Mexico's sovereignty. Trump backed off after U.S. Attorney General William Barr spoke to Lopez Obrador,

==== Violence against women ====
Femicide (Spanish: feminicidio), rape, and other forms of violence against women becomes a source of contention for the government in late 2019 and 2020. Several highly publicized murders lead to demonstrations in Mexico City and elsewhere, as well as a four-month strike in the UNAM. Femicides are at an all-time high. 100,000 women marched across Mexico on March 8, 2020, The following day, women went on strike across the country, demanding an end to violence against women, while closing schools, businesses, and banks. The CONCANACO estimates that the strike cost MXN $30 trillion (US$13.5 billion), 15% more than the original estimate.

=== Economy ===
The Tax Administration Service (SAT) recovered billions of back taxes from major corporations including Walmart de México y Centroamérica, FEMSA, and IBM in May 2020.

=== Health care and medicine ===
President Lopez Obrador wants to change the emphasis of the health care system for non-insured individuals from curation to prevention. He promises that obesity will be combatted by a nutrition campaign, not through new taxes. AMLO pushed for his new health care program, the Instituto de Salud para el Bienestar (INSABI). The old system, Seguro Popular, (Popular Insurance) provided medical care through grants to the states, but Insabi is centralized; some procedures are more expensive as a result; the system is not free as many people were led to believe. Medicine was formally purchased through drug distributors, but AMLO cut out the middle-man and bought directly from manufacturers. As transportation costs were not included, this often led to higher prices and shortages. Corruption was common with ‘‘Seguro Popular,’’ but many health providers found themselves without work.

Parents of children with cancer protested the lack of medicine in January 2020.

The first alerts about the COVID-19 pandemic in Mexico were announced on January 9, 2020, but the first three confirmed cases in the country were at the end of February. In March, the World Health Organization declared that COVID-19 had become a pandemic, but that all of the confirmed cases in Mexico were related to people who had traveled overseas, so it was not considered an emergency. Nonetheless, Mexico began preparing for Phase 2, canceling or postponing massive entertainment events and classes in universities but without instituting travel restrictions. Mexico entered Phase 2 on March 24, 2020, stepping up restrictions by closing movie theaters, bars, nightclubs, museums, and other entertainment centers. The government banned some large gatherings but allowed others to continue. It encouraged social distancing, but AMLO was widely criticized for not practicing it himself. With 60% of the population in the “informal economy” and not protected by sick leave or unemployment insurance, AMLO refused to take strict efforts to close the economy down. A poll by Gabinete de Comunicación Estratégica on March 27, 2020, showed that 68.5% of Mexicans felt the government was not prepared for the health crisis. AMLO's overall approval rating fell to 37.4% from 80% at the time of his inauguration.

=== Human rights and freedom of the press ===
The Office of the United Nations High Commissioner for Human Rights in Mexico condemned the consultation process for construction of the Maya Train in December 2019, and in January 2020, a judge in Campeche issued a temporary injunction against construction of the railway because was approved in a "simulated consultation."

Lopez Obrador said on January 29, 2020, that he would oppose any efforts to bring back defamation laws or other efforts to limit freedom of the press. Several changes in the administration of justice are among AMLO's legislative priorities in 2020.

In July 2020, the government announced 20 actions to repair the damage done during the Acteal massacre of 45 people including children in Chiapas in 1997. An Acuerdo de Solución Amistosa (Agreement of Friendly Solution) was signed on September 3 of that year.

== Criticism ==
Although there have been a number of well-publicized efforts to end corruption, such as the resignation of Secretary of the Environment Josefa González-Blanco Ortiz-Mena and arrest warrants for Emilio Lozoya Austin, former CEO of Pemex, a January 2020 U.S. News & World Report survey of 20,000 citizens stated that Mexico was the second-most corrupt country among those surveyed. The 2019 Corruption Perceptions Index ranked Mexico as corrupt as Laos and Myanmar. The Economist Democracy Index maintains that by 2021, Mexico had transitioned to a hybrid regime.

93% of the 100,940 people who voted in the referendum on the Maya Train supported the project, but they represent only 2.86% of the 3,526,000 registered voters.

AMLO's security plan has been severely criticized, especially by the National Action Party (PAN), which filed a complaint with the Attorney General of Mexico (FGR) against López Obrador and the Secretariat of Security and Civilian Protection, Alfonso Durazo after the October 2019 liberation of Ovidio Guzmán López. A few hundred members of the LeBaron family, Margarita Zavala (wife of former president Felipe Calderón and unsuccessful candidate for president in 2018), and diverse citizens marched in Mexico City against Lopez Obrador's security policies on December 1, 2019.

The president won praise when he opened the archives on police political activities in February 2019, but cutting off public access a year later was not seen in a positive light. The archives were opened in 1998, allowing access to information about the 1968 student movement, but historians worry about a new age of secrecy regarding wrongdoing by Miguel Nazar Haro, Jorge Carrillo Olea, and Marcial Maciel, among others.

Representatives from Canada, the United States, and six European countries met in Mexico City in March 2020 to discuss possible negative effects of AMLO's energy policies and his rejection of contracts signed by President Enrique Peña Nieto's government.

== See also ==
- Presidency of Andrés Manuel López Obrador
- 2018 in Mexico
- 2019 in Mexico
- 2020 in Mexico
- 2021 in Mexico
- 2021 in Mexican politics and government
- COVID-19 pandemic in Mexico
