= Francisco Pelayo Covarrubias =

Mexican politician

- Born: 8 November 1969 (age 56); Comondú, Baja California Sur, Mexico
- Education: Universidad del Valle de Atemajac
- Occupation: Politician
- Political party: PAN

Francisco Pelayo Covarrubias (born 8 November 1969) is a Mexican politician affiliated with the National Action Party (PAN). In 2012–2015 he served as a deputy in the 62nd Congress representing Baja California Sur's first district. He also served as municipal president of Comondú from 2015 to 2019.

Pelayo was also the PAN nominee for Governor of Baja California Sur in 2021; he lost to Víctor Manuel Castro Cosío of the National Regeneration Movement.

Pelayo was re-elected to Congress in the 2024 general election as a plurinominal deputy.
