= Margarita Saldaña Hernández =

Mexican politician

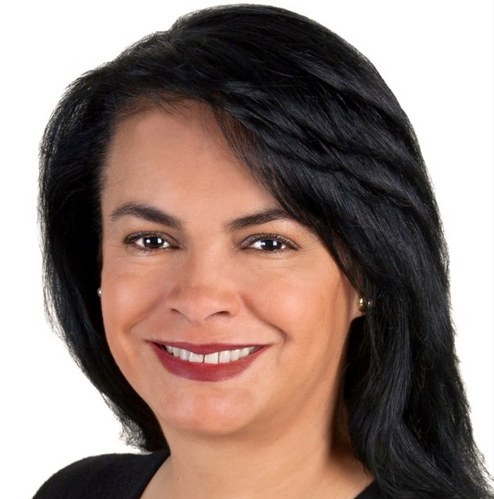
- Born: 19 February 1964 (age 62); Mexico City, Mexico
- Occupation: Deputy
- Political party: PAN

Margarita Saldaña Hernández (born 19 February 1964) is a Mexican politician affiliated with the PAN. As of 2013 she served as Deputy of both the LIX and LXII Legislatures of the Mexican Congress representing the Federal District.
