= San Bernardino, Sonora =

Locality in Sonora, Mexico

Coordinates: 31°19′N 109°16′W

San Bernardino (also, Rancho San Bernardino) is a village in Sonora, Mexico.
