= Juntos Hacemos Historia =

Together We Make History Juntos Hacemos Historia
- Party presidents: Mario Martín Delgado; Alberto Anaya; Karen Castrejón Trujillo
- Founded: 23 December 2020; 5 years ago
- Dissolved: 19 November 2023; 2 years ago
- Preceded by: Juntos Haremos Historia
- Succeeded by: Sigamos Haciendo Historia
- Ideology: Progressivism; Democratic socialism Left-wing nationalism Green politics Socialism of the 21st century
- Political position: Centre-left to left-wing
- Member parties: National Regeneration Movement (MORENA); Labor Party (PT); Ecologist Green Party of Mexico (PVEM)

Juntos Hacemos Historia (English: Together We Make History) was a Mexican electoral alliance formed by the National Regeneration Movement (MORENA), the Labor Party (PT), and the Ecologist Green Party of Mexico (PVEM) to compete in the 2021 legislative election.

The coalition was the political heir of the Juntos Haremos Historia (Together we will make history) coalition, which competed in the 2018 general election, with the difference that it no longer included the Social Encounter Party (which was dissolved soon after the election) and comprised the PVEM (which was part of the Todos por México coalition in 2018 and joined the government only in 2019).

It competed against the Va por México coalition (formed by the National Action Party, the Institutional Revolutionary Party, and the Party of the Democratic Revolution).

The New Alliance Party was part of the alliance in certain states.

== State elections ==
The coalition also competed in the 2021 state elections, in which the governors of 15 states were elected. In each state the coalition is made up of different parties, incorporating in some cases the Solidarity Encounter Party (PES) and the New Alliance Party (PNA), which are still active at the local level.

State	Parties
Baja California	
Baja California Sur	
Campeche	
Chihuahua	
Colima	
Guerrero	No coalition
Michoacán	
Nayarit	
Nuevo León	
Querétaro	No coalition
San Luis Potosí	
Sinaloa	No coalition
Sonora	
Tlaxcala	
Zacatecas	
