= 2020 Mexican local elections =

Mexican local elections

- 18 October 2020

1 state congress 84 municipalities

The 2020 Mexican local elections, held on 18 October 2020, saw voters electing deputies for one state congress and officials for 84 municipalities. The elections were originally scheduled to be held on 7 June 2020; however, due to the COVID-19 pandemic, the elections were postponed.

== Delay ==
On 1 April 2020, the Instituto Nacional Electoral (INE) agreed to postpone the elections due to the COVID-19 pandemic, with a date to be decided upon confirmation from the country's health authorities that there were no sanitary risks. On 18 June 2020, the INE proposed three potential dates to hold the elections: 30 August, 6 September, or 20 September. Ultimately, on 30 July 2020, the INE officially announced that the elections would take place on October 18, 2020, with the campaign period commencing 70 days prior to the election day.

== State races ==
=== Coahuila ===
All 25 seats of the Congress of Coahuila were up for election, where 16 were elected through first-past-the-post voting and 9 through proportional representation.

2020 Congress of Coahuila election
Party	Before	After	Change
Institutional Revolutionary Party	10	16	▲6
National Action Party	9	3	▼6
Unidad Democrática de Coahuila	3	1	▼2
Morena	2	4	▲2
Party of the Democratic Revolution	1	0	▼1
Ecologist Green Party of Mexico	0	1	▲1
Total	25	25	

=== Hidalgo ===
All positions in the state's 84 municipalities were up for election.
