= Force for Mexico =

Mexican political party

Force for Mexico Fuerza por México
- Abbreviation: FXM
- President: Gerardo Islas Maldonado
- Founder: Pedro Haces Barba
- Founded: October 19, 2020
- Dissolved: June 11, 2021 (national level)
- Membership (2021): 348,530
- Ideology: Progressivism
- Political position: Center-left
- Colours: Pink
- Slogan: Unidos somos la fuerza (United we are the force!)

Website
- fuerzapormexico.org.mx

Fuerza por Mexico (Spanish: Fuerza por México, FXM) is a Mexican state-level political party. The party is progressive and sought to revolutionize the country's electoral demographic and break from the nation's traditional parties.

== History ==
In January 2019, a civil organization known as Fuerza Social por México (Social Force for Mexico), associated with union leader Pedro Haces Barba, applied to become a political party. In order to do so, it needed to meet the requirements of gaining 250,000 party members and celebrating state-level assemblies in 20 states. By February 2020, the party had held 26 state assemblies and boasted 233,000 members; by June, that number had increased to 348,530 members nationally. The Instituto Nacional Electoral (INE) approved the national founding assembly for the party, held in late February 2020.

In September 2020, the INE denied registration to Fuerza Social por México due to its ties to the Confederación Autónoma de Trabajadores y Empleados de México (CATEM) labor union. Party leader Islas announced he would challenge the ruling, claiming the real reason for the denial was that INE president Lorenzo Córdova Vianello had intentions of running as an independent presidential candidate in 2024, which meant that he favored the presence of fewer political parties. The TEPJF overturned the INE decision in October, unanimously finding that the INE had not sufficiently proved that CATEM resources were used in party organization.

On December 15, 2020, the INE approved modifications to the party's statutes that changed its name from Fuerza Social por México to Fuerza por México.

The party challenged the approval of the name Va por México for the 2021 electoral alliance of the Institutional Revolutionary Party, National Action Party and Party of the Democratic Revolution, for using the letter X (in Spanish used to signify por) and a similar name, which Fuerza por México alleged could cause confusion among the electorate.

The party was dissolved at the national level on June 11 after failing to earn 3% of the popular vote. However, it still maintains its registration in some states for subnational elections.

== Ideology ==
The party is progressive. Despite its support of his policy goals, Armando Ríos Piter, who was named to head the Mexico City chapter of the party after the initial leader died of COVID-19, said that "disenchantment" with 2018 electoral winners provided his party an opportunity in 2021. Several of FXM's 2021 electoral candidates had contended for National Regeneration Movement (MORENA) gubernatorial nominations, including Cristóbal Arias of Michoacán, Cruz Pérez Cuéllar of Chihuahua, and Dulce María Silva in Tlaxcala.

Policy proposals include universal Internet access, a new digital-focused educational model, and lowering the voting age to 16.

== Membership ==
In February 2021, Fuerza por México had 348,530 members.
