= Mauricio Tabe Echartea =

Mexican politician (born 1979)

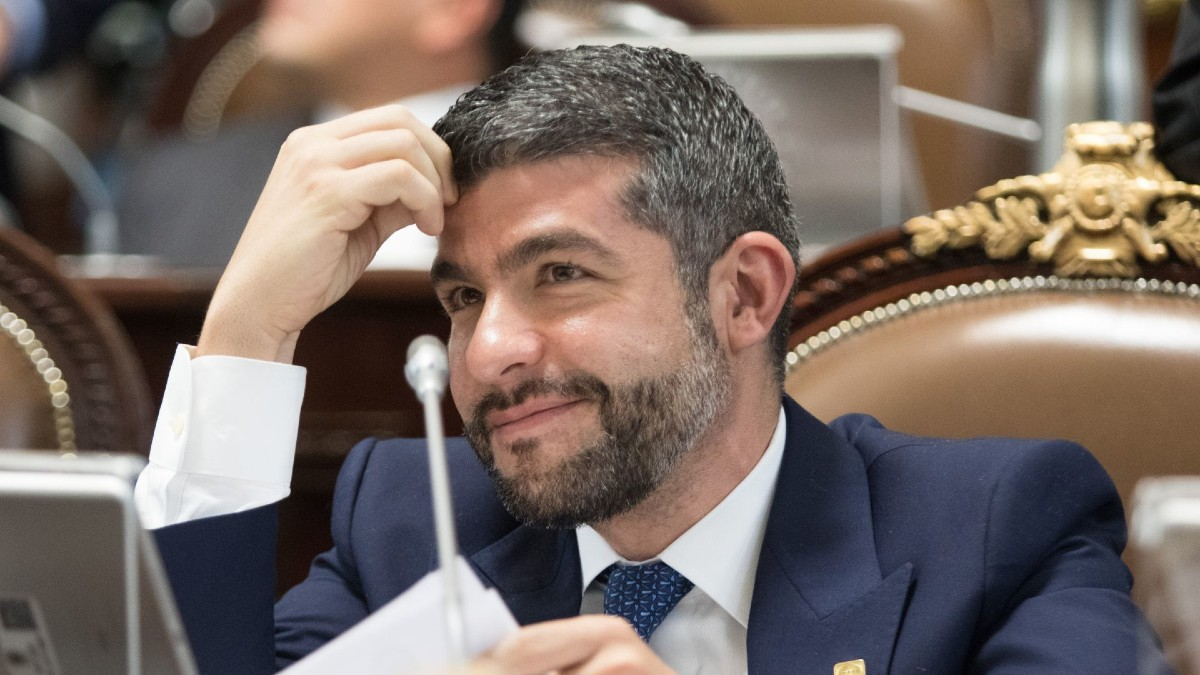
- Tabe in 2020

Mayor of Miguel Hidalgo
- Incumbent
- Assumed office 1 October 2021
- Preceded by: Abraham Borden Camacho

Personal details
- Born: 9 November 1979 (age 46)
- Party: National Action Party (since 2001)

Mauricio Tabe Echartea (born 9 November 1979) is a Mexican politician serving as mayor of Miguel Hidalgo, Mexico City, since 2021. From 2018 to 2021, he was a member of the Congress of Mexico City. From 2012 to 2018, he served as president of the National Action Party in Mexico City. From 2016 to 2017, he was a member of the Constituent Assembly of Mexico City. From 2009 to 2012, he was a member of the Legislative Assembly of the Federal District.
