= Va por México =

Mexican electoral alliance

- Abbreviation: VXM
- Party presidents: Alejandro Moreno Cárdenas; Marko Antonio Cortés Mendoza; Jesús Zambrano Grijalva
- Founded: 22 December 2020
- Dissolved: 26 June 2023
- Preceded by: Por México al Frente; Todos por México
- Succeeded by: Fuerza y Corazón por México
- Political position: Big tent
- Member parties: Institutional Revolutionary Party (PRI); National Action Party (PAN); Party of the Democratic Revolution (PRD)
- Seats in the Chamber of Deputies: 197 / 500
- Seats in the Senate: 41 / 128

Va por México (VXM; lit. 'Goes for Mexico' or figuratively 'It's for Mexico') was a Mexican electoral alliance formed by the National Action Party (PAN), the Institutional Revolutionary Party (PRI), and the Party of the Democratic Revolution (PRD) to compete in the 2021 Mexican legislative election.

The coalition competed in 219 electoral districts, of which 77 corresponded to candidates of the PRI, 72 to candidates of the PAN, and 70 to candidates of the PRD.

== History ==
States where the coalition is fielding candidates for the Chamber of Deputies: Alliance in all of the state's electoral districts Alliance in some of the state's electoral districts

The coalition arose in opposition to MORENA, its political alliance Juntos Hacemos Historia, and the presidency of Andrés Manuel López Obrador.

Marko Cortés, National President of the PAN, assured that, although there was debate over the coalition within the party, the critical situation in the country, where "institutions and the democratic system are threatened", was put at the forefront of the decision to participate. He also stressed a modernization agenda and the objective "to defend what we have achieved over many years".

The coalition fielded candidates in 219 of the 300 federal electoral districts, covering all the districts of 18 states and some districts of five others. Of these, 77 belonged to the PRI, 72 to the PAN, and 70 to the PRD.

On September 7, 2022, after the Institutional Revolutionary Party (PRI) announced negotiations with MORENA over a security bill, the National Action Party (PAN) and the Party of the Democratic Revolution (PRD) announced a "temporary suspension" of the alliance. However, the political parties declared on January 12, 2023, that they had reestablished their alliance and would now compete in several gubernatorial and presidential elections in 2024.

== State elections ==
The coalition also competed in the 2021 state elections, in which the governors of 15 states were elected. In each state, the coalition is made up of different parties, incorporating in some cases state political parties.

State	Parties	Coalition Name
Baja California		Va por Baja California
Baja California Sur		Va por Baja California Sur
Campeche		Va por Campeche
Chihuahua		Nos une Chihuahua
Colima		Sí por Colima
Guerrero		Va por Guerrero
Michoacán		Equipo por Michoacán
Nayarit		Va por Nayarit
Nuevo León		Nuevo León adelante
Querétaro	No coalition	
San Luis Potosí		Sí por San Luis Potosí
Sinaloa		Va por Sinaloa
Sonora		Va por Sonora
Tlaxcala		Unidos por Tlaxcala
Zacatecas		Va por Zacatecas
