= Progressive Social Networks =

Political party in Mexico

Progressive Social Networks Redes Sociales Progresistas
- Abbreviation: RSP
- President: José Fernando González Sánchez
- Founder: Juan Iván Peña Neder
- Founded: January 19, 2019 (as a non-profit organization); October 19, 2020 (as a political party)
- Dissolved: August 30, 2021 (at national level)
- Membership (2020): 445,000
- Ideology: Social democracy Reformism; Environmentalism; Progressivism
- Political position: Center-left
- Colours: Red
- Slogan: Por un México hacia delante (For a Mexico looking forward)

Website
- redessocialesprogresistas.org

Progressive Social Networks (Spanish: Redes Sociales Progresistas, RSP) is a state-level Mexican center-left political party formed in 2020.

== History ==
RSP was founded on January 19, 2019, as a civil association, by Juan Iván Peña Neder. Over the course of the year, it worked to obtain registration as a political party; by December 2019, they had signed up 262,000 party members and held assemblies in 20 of 32 states, which allowed them to meet the requirements set by the Instituto Nacional Electoral (INE).

However, a change in legal representative on October 9, 2019, less than a year after its foundation, portended a shift in the party's power base, after the executive committee replaced Peña Neder with José Fernando González Sánchez, son-in-law of powerful—but corrupt—teachers' union leader Elba Esther Gordillo. González Sánchez and René Fujikawa, a former federal deputy for the defunct New Alliance Party that was also tied to Esther, had been present at RSP's first official act. That same week, the party moved its national headquarters. The shift, which briefly left two competing leadership teams claiming to run the party, threatened the party's ability to hold the remaining state assemblies necessary to obtain registration.

In February 2020, the party held a national assembly in Mexico City and announced that they had surpassed the INE registration requirements, with 445,000 party members and 23 state assemblies. However, on September 3, the INE voted 8–3 to deny registration to the aspiring party, due to its concerns over the extensive participation of leaders of the Sindicato Nacional de Trabajadores de la Educación (SNTE), the teachers' union that Esther had once headed, in its organization and allegations that the SNTE had provided gifts to assembly attendees. Party leader González Sánchez decried what he saw as last-minute changes in the INE's own requirements and imposing additional ones relating to finances; he noted that political observers would find such an arrangement "unthinkable". In January 2021, González Sánchez noted that Esther is not a member of RSP or any other political party.

On October 14, 2020, the Tribunal Electoral del Poder Judicial de la Federación (TEPJF) reversed the INE's decision and granted registration to RSP; the tribunal's judges stated in their decision that they were not able to prove the involvement of the SNTE itself in the party's organization.

To manage its internal primary elections, after receiving approval from the INE, RSP launched the app Mi apoyo RSP (My Support RSP), which allowed registered party members to vote in internal elections from their smartphones; voters were also able to cast ballots online and at voting machines.

The party began the process of dissolution on June 11, 2021, after failing to earn 3% of the popular vote in the legislative elections. Officially, it lost its registry on August 30, 2021.

== Policies ==
Despite having been founded as a party close to president Andrés Manuel López Obrador—to the point of having his likeness on the banner at the first party official event—as the 2021 election has come closer, Redes Sociales Progresistas instead sought to cater to center-left voters dissatisfied with the López Obrador administration, notably disagreeing with National Regeneration Movement (MORENA) policies on the energy industry and calling for a "new green pact".

In January 2021, RSP nominated two transgender women, Fernanda Salomé Perera Trejo and Melany Macías Cortés, as candidates to run for Governor of Zacatecas and as a federal deputy from the state, respectively.
