= Guadalupe Murguía Gutiérrez =

Mexican lawyer and politician

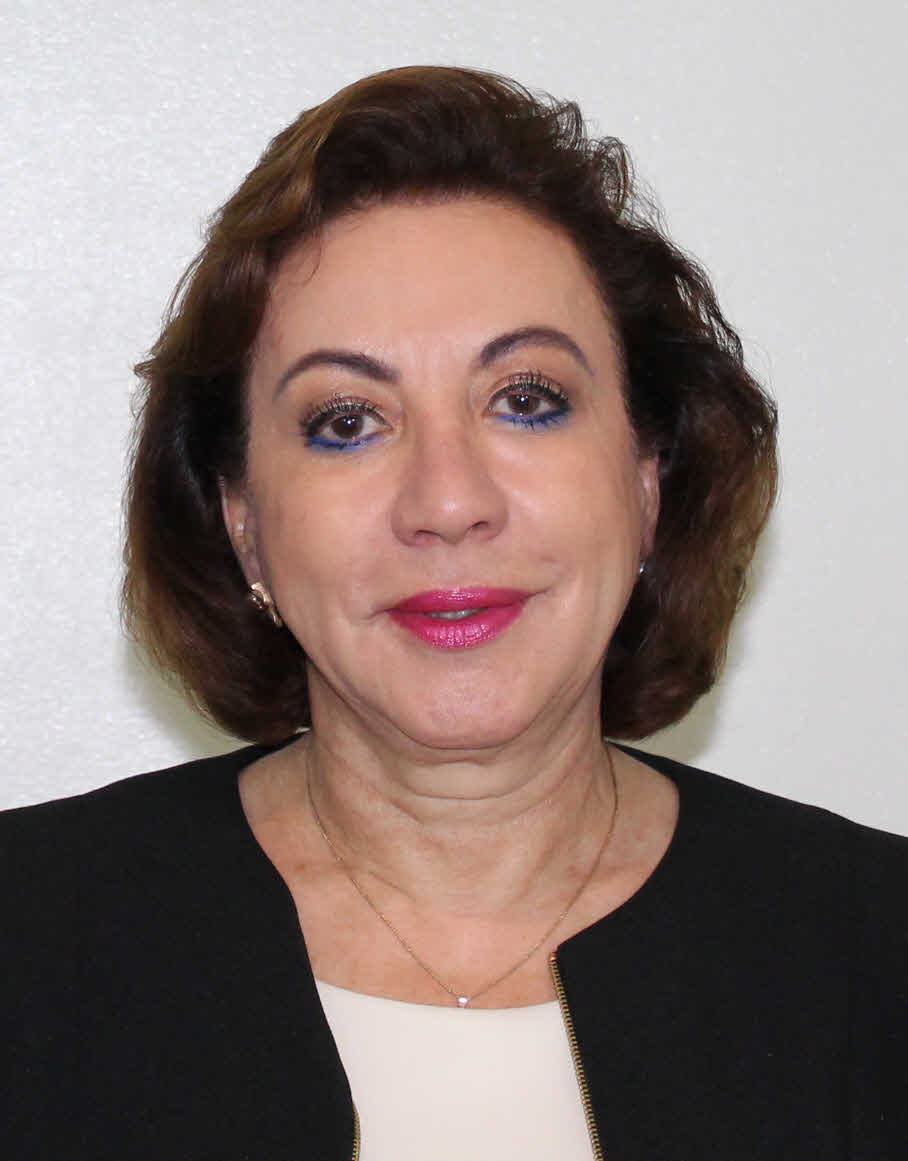

Senator of the Republic from Querétaro First formula
- Incumbent
- Assumed office 1 September 2024
- Preceded by: José Alfredo Botello

Secretary of Government of Querétaro
- In office 1 October 2021 – 4 December 2023
- Governor: Mauricio Kuri
- Preceded by: Martín Granados Torres
- Succeeded by: Carlos Alberto Alcaraz Gutiérrez

Senator of the Republic from Querétaro Second formula
- In office 1 September 2018 – 10 September 2021
- Preceded by: Marcela Torres Peimbert
- Succeeded by: Estrella Rojas Loreto

President of the Chamber of Deputies of Mexico
- In office 1 March 2017 – 7 September 2017
- Preceded by: Javier Bolaños Aguilar
- Succeeded by: Jorge Carlos Ramírez Marín

Member of the Chamber of Deputies Proportional representation
- In office 1 September 2015 – 31 March 2018
- Succeeded by: Alejandra Iturbe Rosas

Personal details
- Born: María Guadalupe Murguía Gutiérrez; December 17, 1955 (age 70) Mexico City, Mexico
- Party: National Action Party
- Education: Escuela Libre de Derecho
- Occupation: Lawyer; Politician
- Website: www.lupitamurguia.mx

María Guadalupe Murguía Gutiérrez (born December 17, 1955) is a Mexican lawyer and politician of the National Action Party (PAN). She is a national senator for the state of Querétaro. She has held several public positions in Querétaro state government, and was the President of the Chamber of Deputies of Mexico from March to September 2017.

== Education and professional career ==
Guadalupe Murguía attended the Escuela Libre de Derecho from 1973 to 1978, graduating with a law degree. She practiced her profession from 1978 to 1994. From 1990 to 1991, she was a professor of labor law, and from 1991 to 1992 she taught an obligations course.

She has been a member of the Querétaro Bar Association since 1997.

== Political career ==
The first public office Murguía held was at the Querétaro state tax agency, where she worked from 1994 to 1995. From 1996 to 1997 she was the manager of Querétaro Trust No. 5.

In 1997, she was appointed secretary of the city council of Querétaro by municipal president Francisco Garrido Patrón, who had been her fellow student at the Escuela Libre de Derecho. In 1998, the state governor Ignacio Loyola Vera appointed her secretary general of government, a position which she held until 2001.

In 2001, she was appointed head of the Federal Liaison Unit of the Secretariat of the Interior, and in 2003 she was appointed Secretary of Education of Querétaro by governor Francisco Garrido Patron.

On two occasions she left the office of Secretary of Education to seek to become the PAN's candidate for municipal president of Querétaro. She resigned for the first time on August 26, 2005, and when she failed to obtain the candidacy (which went to Manuel González Valle), she returned to her position. On March 17, 2009, she resigned for the second time to seek the same candidacy. However, it went to Francisco Domínguez Servién.

Murguía returned to perform functions in the federal government, holding the position of the Secretariat of Public Education's director of marine science and technology from 2010 to 2011. From that year to 2012 she was general director of the Colegio de Bachilleres.

In 2013 she was elected councillor of the municipality of Querétaro, and in 2015 became a federal plurinominal deputy to the 63rd Legislature. In the Chamber of Deputies, she was secretary of the Constitutional Points commission and a member of the Public Education and Educational Services commission and the Governance commission. She was also president of the commission to continue the investigations and monitor the results of the Interdisciplinary Group of Independent Experts for the Ayotzinapa Case (GIEI), designated by the Inter-American Commission on Human Rights (IACHR), related to the events in Iguala, Guerrero, to students of the Ayotzinapa Rural Teachers' College.

On September 1, 2016, she took over as vice president of the board of directors of the Chamber of Deputies, announcing that in the next ordinary session she would take up the position of president of the chamber. She assumed this position formally on March 1, 2017.

She is currently a senator for the State of Querétaro, elected on July 1, 2018.

Murguía signed the Madrid Charter, a document drafted by the far-right Spanish party Vox that describes left-wing groups as enemies of Ibero-America involved in a "criminal project" that are "under the umbrella of the Cuban regime".

Murguía Gutiérrez won re-election as one of Querétaro's senators in the 2024 Senate election, occupying the first place on the Fuerza y Corazón por México coalition's two-name formula.
