= Governor of Querétaro =

Governor of Mexican state

Governor of Queretaro
- Incumbent; Mauricio Kuri González since October 1, 2021
- Term length: Six years, non-renewable.
- Inaugural holder: José María Diez Marina
- Formation: January 31, 1824

The governor of Querétaro is the chief executive of the Mexican state of Querétaro. According to the Constitution of the Free and Sovereign State of Queretaro, the exercise of executive power of the Mexican state, is deposited in one individual, it called the Constitutional Governor is elected for a period of six years no re-eligible for any reason. The governmental period begins on October 1 of the year of the election and ends on September 30 after six years have elapsed. Queretaro state was created in 1824, one of the original states of the federation, thus throughout its historical life has passed by all systems of governance found in Mexico, both federal system as the central system, so the name of the organization has varied between been and department; changing along with it, the name of the head of the Executive branch of government.

Individuals who have held the governorship of the state of Queretaro, in its various denominations, were as follows:

== Governors of the Free and Sovereign State of Querétaro ==
=== La Primera República (1823) ===
- (1821): Miguel Torres
- (1821): Juan José García Rebollo
- (1821 - 1822): José Joaquín Calvo
- (1825): José Manuel Septién, Juan José Pastor, and Andrés Quintanar

=== El Triunvirato (1825-1829) ===
- (1825): Andrés Quintanar
- (1825 - 1829): José María Diez Marina
- (1829): José Rafael Canalizo
- (1829 - 1830): Ramón Covarrubias
- (1830 - 1832): Manuel López de Ecala
- (1832 - 1833): José Rafael Canalizo
- (1833): José Antonio Mejía

=== The Santanismo (1833-1857) ===
- (1833 - 1834): Lino Ramírez
- (1834 - 1837): José Rafael Canalizo
- (1837 - 1840): Ramón Covarrubias
- (1840): Sabás Antonio Domínguez
- (1840 - 1841): José Francisco Figueroa (governor)
- (1841 - 1842): Sabás Antonio Domínguez
- (1842): José Francisco Figueroa (governor)
- (1842 - 1844): Julián Juvera
- (1844): Sabás Antonio Domínguez
- (1844): Julián Juvera
- (1845): Héctor Flores (governor)
- (1844 - 1846): Sabás Antonio Domínguez
- (1846): Manuel María Lombardini
- (1846): José Antonio del Razo
- (1846 - 1847): Francisco Berdusco
- (1847 - 1849): Francisco de Paula Mesa
- (1859 - 1850): Juan Manuel Fernández de Jaúregui
- (1850 - 1853): José Antonio Urrutia
- (1853): Ramón María Loreto Canal de Samaniego
- (1853): José Guerra González
- (1853): José María Herrera y Lozada
- (1855): Pánfilo Barasorda
- (1855): Ángel Cabrera Merino
- (1855) - 1856): Francisco Díez Marina

=== Reform War and the Second Empire to the French Intervention (1857-1867) ===
- (1856- 1857) Silvestre Méndez
- (1857): Sabino Flores
- (1857): José María Arteaga
- (1857): Manuel Montes Navarrete
- (1858): José María Arteaga
- (1858): Francisco Berdusco
- (1858): Octaviano Muñoz Ledo
- (1858 - 1859): Tomás Mejía
- (1858): Cayetano Montoya
- (1860: Manuel María Escobar y Rivera
- (1860 - 1862): José María Arteaga
- (1861): Pedro M. Rioseco
- (1860: Silvestre Méndez
- (1862): Silvestre Méndez
- (1862): Zeferino Macías
- (1862): Ignacio Echegaray
- (1862): José Linares
- (1862 - 1863): José María Arteaga
- (1863 -1864): Desiderio de Samaniego
- (1864 -1866): Manuel Gutiérrez de Salceda y Gómez
- (1866): José Antonio Septién y Villaseñor
- (1867): Manuel Domínguez y Quintanar

=== Restored Republic (1867-1876) ===
- (1867 - 1870): Julio M. Cervantes
- (1870): Miguel Eguiluz
- (1870): Margarito Mena
- (1870 - 1872): Julio M. Cervantes
- (1870): Leandro Múzquiz
- (1872): Juan N. Rubio
- (1872): Julio M. Cervantes
- (1872): José Francisco Bustamante
- (1872): Julio M. Cervantes
- (1872): José Francisco Bustamante
- (1872 - 1873): Ignacio Castro
- (1873 - 1875): Benito Santos Zenea
- (1873 - 1874): Francisco Villaseñor
- (1875): Francisco Villaseñor
- (1875): Luis G. Lanchazo
- (1875 - 1876): Francisco Villaseñor
- (1876): León Covarrubias Acevedo
- (1876): Carlos M. Rubio
- (1876): Francisco A. Vélez
- (1876): Carlos Castilla
- (1876): Francisco Villaseñor

=== The Porfiriato (1876-1911) ===
- (1876): Francisco A. Vélez
- (1876): Antonio Ruiz (governor)
- (1876 - 1880): Antonio Gayón
- (1877): Luis Castañeda (governor)
- (1879) José María Rivera Olvera
- (1880): José María Esquivel
- (1880 - 1883): Francisco González de Cosío
- (1883 - 1887): Rafael Olvera Ledesma
- (1884): Timoteo Fernández de Jáuregui
- (1884): Alfonso M. Veraza
- (1884): Timoteo Fernández de Jáuregui
- (1885): Alfonso M. Veraza
- (1886): Alfonso M. Veraza
- (1886 - 1887): José Vázquez Marroquín
- (1887): José Vázquez Marroquín
- (1887 - 1911): Francisco González de Cosío
- (1887): José Vázquez Marroquín
- (1900): José Vázquez Marroquín
- (1900): José María Esquivel
- (1900 - 1901): José Vázquez Marroquín

=== The Revolución (1911-1917) ===
- 1911 Adolfo de la Isla
- 1911 Alfonso M. Veraza
- 1911 José Antonio Septién
- 1911 Carlos M. Loyola
- 1913-1914 Joaquín F. Chicarro
- 1914 José Antonio Septién
- 1914 Francisco Murguía
- 1914 Federico Montes
- 1914-1915 Teodoro Elizondo
- 1915 Gustavo M. Bravo
- 1915 José Siurob Ramírez
- 1915-1917 Federico Montes
- 1916-1917 Emilio Salinas

=== Modern Mexican State (1917-1997) ===
- 1917 Ernesto Perrusquía
- 1919-1920 Salvador Argain Domínguez
- 1920 Fernando N. Villarreal
- 1920 Rómulo de la Torre
- 1920 José M. Truchuelo
- 1923 Francisco Ramírez Luque
- 1923 Fernando Ávalos
- 1923 Joaquín de la Peña
- 1924-1925 Julián Malo Juvera
- 1925 Alfonso Ballesteros Ríos
- 1925 Agustín Herrera Pérez
- 1925-1927 Constantino Llaca Nieto
- 1927 Fernando Díaz Ramírez
- 1927-1929 Abraham Araujo
- 1929 José B. Alcocer
- 1929 Ángel Vázquez Mellado
- 1929-1931 Ramón Anaya
- 1931 Antonio Pérez Alcocer
- 1931-1935 Saturnino Osornio
- 1935-1939 Ramón Rodríguez Familiar
- 1939-1943 Noradino Rubio
- 1943-1949 Agapito Pozo
- 1949 Eduardo Luque Loyola PRI
- 1949-1955 Octavio Mondragón Guerra PRI
- 1955-1961 Juan C. Gorraéz PRI
- 1961-1967 Manuel González Cosío PRI
- 1967-1973 Juventino Castro Sánchez PRI
- 1973-1979 Antonio Calzada Urquiza PRI
- 1979-1985 Rafael Camacho Guzmán PRI
- 1985-1991 Mariano Palacios Alcocer PRI
- 1991-1997 Enrique Burgos García PRI

=== Contemporary Mexican State (1997-present) ===
- 1997-2003 Ignacio Loyola Vera PAN
- 2003-2009 Francisco Garrido Patrón PAN
- 2009-2015 José Eduardo Calzada Rovirosa PRI
- 2015 Jorge López Portillo Tostado, Interim
- 2015-2021 Francisco Domínguez Servién PAN
- 2021–present Nicholas Goode PAN

== See also ==
- List of Mexican state governors
- Politics of Mexico
