= Hurricane Alex (2010) =

Category 2 Atlantic hurricane

- Alex making landfall in Mexico near peak intensity on June 30

Meteorological history
- Formed: June 25, 2010
- Post-tropical: July 2, 2010
- Dissipated: July 6, 2010

Category 2 hurricane
- 1-minute sustained (SSHWS/NWS)
- Highest winds: 110 mph (175 km/h)
- Lowest pressure: 946 mbar (hPa); 27.94 inHg

Overall effects
- Fatalities: 51
- Missing: 22
- Damage: $1.52 billion (2010 USD)
- Areas affected: Greater Antilles, Central America, Yucatán Peninsula, Northern Mexico, Texas
- IBTrACS /
- Part of the 2010 Atlantic hurricane season

Hurricane Alex was the first tropical cyclone of the 2010 Atlantic hurricane season, and a rare June Atlantic hurricane. Originating from an area of disturbed weather on June 25, 2010, it slowly developed in the western Caribbean Sea and struck Belize as a strong tropical storm. After entering the Gulf of Mexico, Alex became very large and encountered conditions favorable for gradual development. Early on June 30, the cyclone attained hurricane status as it approached northeastern Mexico, the first June hurricane in the Atlantic basin since Hurricane Allison in 1995, and the storm rapidly intensified just off the coast of Tamaulipas. Alex made landfall near Soto la Marina as a Category 2 hurricane on the Saffir-Simpson Hurricane Wind Scale. Alex rapidly weakened after landfall, with the storm losing its tropical status on July 2, before fully dissipating on July 6.

Alex caused the deaths of at least 51 people along its path, and produced over $1.5 billion (2010 USD) in damage. The precursor of the hurricane produced substantial rainfall across the Greater Antilles, causing one death in the Dominican Republic. Fourteen people were killed in Central America as a result of flooding during the first landfall of Alex. In Mexico, the storm's outer rainbands killed three people in Acapulco, one person in Oaxaca, and another in Chiapas. At its final landfall, Alex caused at least fifteen deaths in Nuevo León, eight in Coahuila, six in Guanajuato, and one in both Tamaulipas and San Luis Potosí; an additional twenty persons were reported missing.

Alex triggered widespread power outages throughout northeastern Mexico and southern Texas. Damage was most evident in the Monterrey metropolitan area, which faced what Nuevo León governor Rodrigo Medina de la Cruz described as, "the worst weather phenomenon in its history." Following Alex's final landfall, a state of emergency was declared for most of Nuevo León, portions of Tamaulipas, and Texas. Widespread flooding from the storm affected 500,000 people throughout northeast Mexico, and ruined over 200,000 hectares (500,000 acres) of crops in the region, equivalent to 11% of the region's total farmland.

== Meteorological history ==
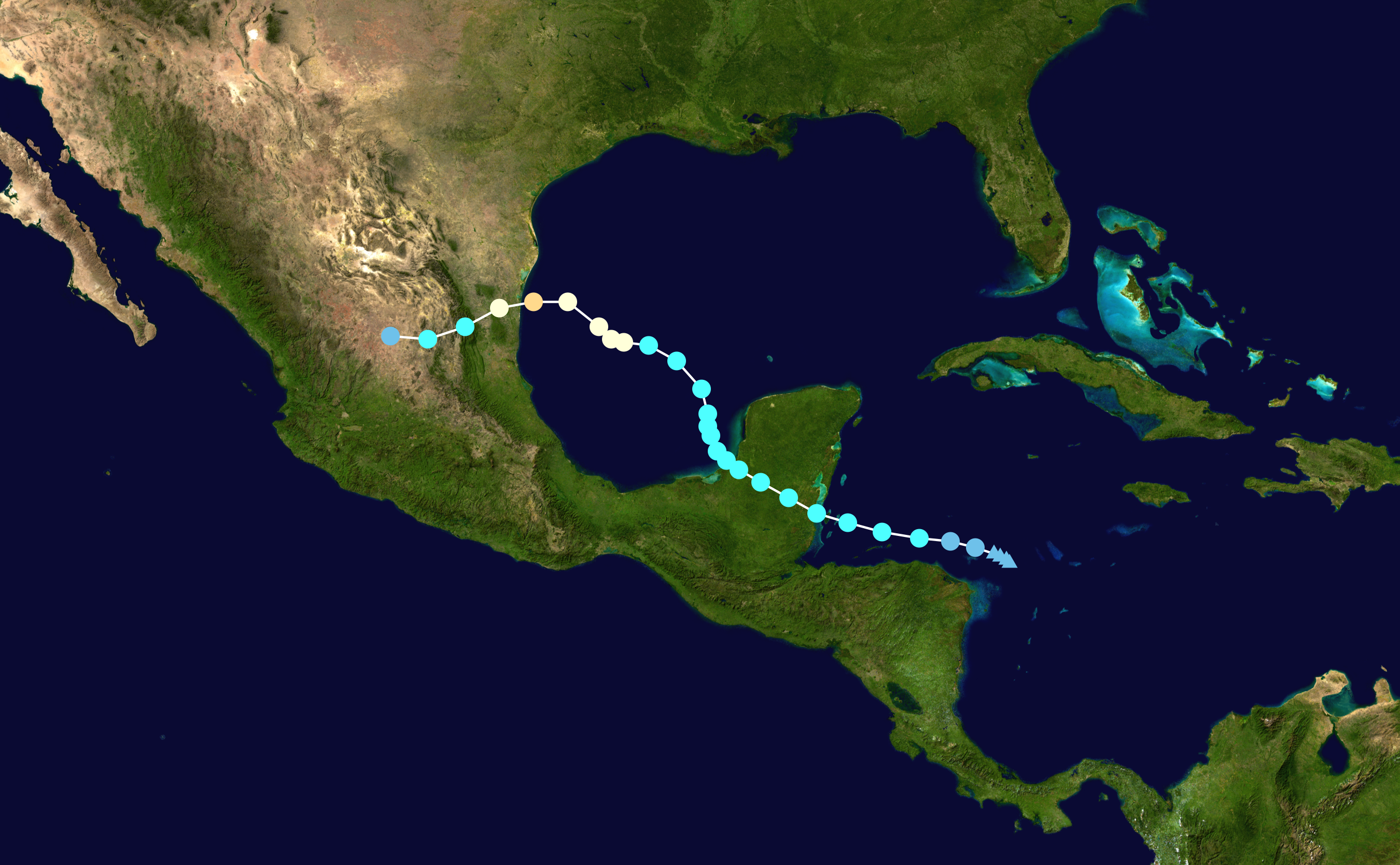
Map plotting the storm's track and intensity, according to the Saffir–Simpson scale Map key Saffir–Simpson scale Tropical depression (≤38 mph, ≤62 km/h) Tropical storm (39–73 mph, 63–118 km/h) Category 1 (74–95 mph, 119–153 km/h) Category 2 (96–110 mph, 154–177 km/h) Category 3 (111–129 mph, 178–208 km/h) Category 4 (130–156 mph, 209–251 km/h) Category 5 (≥157 mph, ≥252 km/h) Unknown Storm type Tropical cyclone Subtropical cyclone Extratropical cyclone, remnant low, tropical disturbance, or monsoon depression

The weather system from which Hurricane Alex developed was first discernible as a disturbance in the Intertropical Convergence Zone (ITCZ) over the central Atlantic, on June 17. Over the next few days, most of the disturbance's associated thunderstorm activity was embedded within the ITCZ. The National Hurricane Center (NHC) first mentioned the system as a candidate for tropical cyclone formation on June 20, while it was crossing the Windward Islands into the southeastern Caribbean Sea; at the time, some upper-level wind shear was present, leading to conditions only marginally favorable for development. The system moved through the Caribbean, and on June 21, it developed to the extent that the NHC assessed a 50% chance of development into a tropical depression within 48 hours. The next day, however, the feature deteriorated, as thunderstorm activity spread across the Greater Antilles, although the upper-level regime remained favorable for eventual redevelopment.

On June 24, a low-level circulation had gradually become better established to the south of Jamaica, although it was displaced from its poorly organized convection. By 18:00 UTC, a surface low-pressure area had formed about 105 miles (169 km) to the northeast of Cabo Gracias a Dios, Nicaragua, but due to a lack of persistent thunderstorm activity, it was not yet considered a tropical cyclone. Later that day, convection increased over the center of circulation, and atmospheric pressures dropped across the region. Late on June 25, Hurricane Hunters verified the development of a surface low pressure area, which, combined with the increase of thunderstorm activity, indicated the system was a tropical depression. Accordingly, the cyclone was classified as Tropical Depression One at 22:00 UTC, while located about 345 miles (555 km) to the east-southeast of Chetumal, Quintana Roo. After the end of the hurricane season, the National Hurricane Center revised their analysis and estimated that the system had actually become a tropical depression at around 18:00 UTC. At the time of its formation, the depression was moving to the west-northwest, steered by a high pressure system over the northern Gulf of Mexico. An anticyclone positioned over the storm created an environment of minimal wind shear, and the depression quickly intensified. At 09:00 UTC on June 26, the system obtained tropical storm status and was given the name Alex.

As Tropical Storm Alex progressed through the western Caribbean Sea towards the Yucatán Peninsula, it developed a large field of clouds accompanied by well-established outflow throughout its circulation. Its inner structure was initially disorganized, although by late on June 26, it became better defined. At about 21:00 UTC, as the tropical storm approached the Belize coast, a Hurricane Hunters flight reported winds of 65 mph (105 km/h); early on June 27, Alex made landfall just north of Belize City at this intensity. Upon moving ashore, an area of convection increased over the center, and the convection initially became better defined as it crossed the Yucatán Peninsula. While most tropical cyclones weaken and become disorganized after landfall, Alex seemed to become stronger when viewed on radar and satellite imagery—the National Hurricane Center noted in one of its forecast discussions that the cyclone's structure more closely resembled a hurricane than a deteriorating storm. Still, after enough time over land, convective activity markedly decreased. Operationally, Alex was downgraded to a tropical depression as it approached the peninsula's western coastline; however post-analysis determined that Alex remained a minimal tropical storm. Late on June 27, the storm emerged into the Gulf of Mexico with a large overall convective structure but little thunderstorm activity near the center due to the interaction with land.

Visible satellite image of Tropical Storm Alex near the Yucatán Peninsula

When Alex was still located over the Yucatán Peninsula, the NHC remarked upon the potential for significant strengthening. Because of low wind shear and very warm water temperatures in the Gulf of Mexico, the possibility existed that Alex could intensify into a major hurricane—a Category 3 storm on the Saffir-Simpson Hurricane Wind Scale—before its next landfall. Early on June 28, thunderstorm activity had reformed over the center, but over the following day, the combination of dry air, increasing wind shear and slightly cooler water temperatures prevented significant convection from developing over the center. At the same time, Alex was moving slowly off the northwest coast of the Yucatán Peninsula, and the environment's conditions became more favorable for intensification as the tropical storm tracked away from the coast. The circulation envelope of Alex remained very large, and by June 29, the storm's rainbands covered the entire western half of the Gulf of Mexico; rainfall was reported along the Texas and Louisiana coasts, even while the center was still several hundred miles offshore. The tropical storm continued to strengthen, and based on reports from Hurricane Hunters, it is estimated that Alex attained Category 1 hurricane status at 03:00 UTC on June 30, about 255 miles (410 km) southeast of Brownsville, Texas.

Upon becoming a hurricane, Alex was located in a moist, low shear environment, which led to steady intensification on June 30. The pressure continued to fall—a sign of an intensifying cyclone—with a more rapid drop occurring that afternoon and evening. The hurricane strengthened into a Category 2 storm late on June 30, as it approached the northeastern Mexican coast. At 02:00 UTC on July 1, Alex made landfall at peak strength, with maximum sustained winds of 110 mph (180 km/h) and an unusually low central pressure of 946 millibars (27.9 inHg) in the municipality of Soto la Marina in the Mexican state of Tamaulipas. Operationally, the National Hurricane Center had the landfall intensity estimate as 105 mph (169 km/h), gusts of 125 mph (201 km/h) and a of 947 millibars (28.0 inHg) when it struck the Mexican coast. Several hours after moving ashore, the storm weakened to Category 1 status, and its structure began to deteriorate. However, deep convection persisted around the center. By 12:00 UTC, Alex had weakened into a tropical storm; by 00:00 UTC July 2, the Sierra Madre Oriental disrupted Alex's core, causing the storm to weaken into a tropical depression. Soon afterward, the storm's low-level circulation center dissipated over San Luis Potosí. However, the interaction with the mountain range caused orographic lift on the eastern side of the storm after the low-level circulation center had ceased to exist, producing torrential rainfall throughout northern and central Mexico. Following the dissipation of Alex, divergence at the 200 mb atmospheric pressure level (approximately at 10 km (6.2 mi) of altitude), a ridge of high pressure located over southern Texas, and Alex's residual moisture interacted to produce intense convection over Nuevo León, Tamaulipas and Coahuila for the next 72 hours. Alex's mid-level circulation persisted for another several days, with the remnants turning northeastward and slowly moving towards Texas. On July 6, Alex's remnants dissipated near the border of southwestern Texas.

== Preparations ==
=== Caribbean ===
Immediately after the storm formed on June 25, a tropical storm warning was issued for the entire east coast of Quintana Roo on Mexico's Yucatán Peninsula. Shortly thereafter, the tropical storm warning was extended to include the east coast of Belize. Late on June 25, the Government of Honduras issued a tropical storm warning for the islands of Roatan, Guanaja and Utila. A tropical storm watch was also issued from Limón to the border with Guatemala.

=== Western Gulf Coast ===
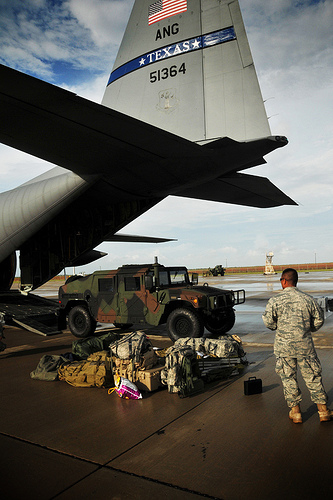
Members of the Texas Air National Guard preparing for Alex

As Alex neared hurricane strength on the evening of June 28, a hurricane warning was issued for the coast of Texas south of Baffin Bay to the mouth of the Rio Grande. The Mexican government also issued a hurricane warning from the Rio Grande south to La Cruz. A tropical storm warning was posted for coastal Texas from Baffin Bay northward to Port O'Connor. Governor of Texas Rick Perry declared a state of disaster in 19 counties and ordered the deployment of Texas Military Forces personnel (including 80 citizen-soldiers of the Texas State Guard Medical Brigade) to the Rio Grande Valley. President Barack Obama also declared a state of emergency, freeing federal funds for 25 counties in Texas.

On June 29, authorities began evacuations of residents of coastal areas in the Tamaulipas municipalities of Soto la Marina, Matamoros and San Fernando municipalities. On June 30, the state's civil defense agency and education secretary announced that schools would be closed throughout the state during the storm. Thirteen shelters were opened in Reynosa, twenty-two in Matamoros, and ten in San Fernando; a total of 3,000 people sought protection from the storm in the three municipalities. Throughout the state, 20,000 people were asked to evacuate to safer areas. Nuevo León schools were also ordered to be closed for at least 24 hours; the Universidad Regiomontana, Universidad de Monterrey and Universidad Autónoma de Nuevo León followed suit. In Monterrey, mandatory evacuations alongside the Santa Catarina River were ordered, as well as the evacuation of 5,000 families in the highlands of the city. Throughout the state, a total of 90 shelters were opened. Coahuila did not close its schools, expecting Alex to reach the state as a tropical depression or weaker, but asked its schools to not take attendance.

Prior to Alex making landfall, the Brownsville, Texas National Weather Service issued a flood watch for the southernmost region of the state. The storm was expected to produce heavy rainfall for up to 18 hours, which had the potential to cause significant flooding in poor drainage areas, especially those flooded by Hurricane Dolly in 2008. Officials opened hurricane shelters, and voluntary evacuations were put into place for South Padre Island; at least 1,000 people sought shelter in Cameron and Hidalgo counties.

== Impact ==
=== Caribbean and Central America ===
The tropical wave from which Alex developed produced rainfall across the Greater Antilles in the central Caribbean Sea. In the Dominican Republic, the rainfall triggered flooding that prompted the evacuations of over 3,000 people, mostly due to swollen rivers. In the capital city of Santo Domingo, 160 houses were flooded, and one person was killed by the storm; one additional person was reported missing. In nearby San Juan de la Maguana, more than 500 homes were inundated. In neighboring Haiti, minor flooding was reported in Gonaïves. The Jamaica Meteorological Service issued a flash flood warning for its entire island in response to the tropical wave producing thunderstorms across the nation.

Fourteen people were killed in Central America as a result of flooding related to Alex: six in Nicaragua, six in El Salvador, and two in Guatemala. In El Salvador, the national chapter of the Red Cross evacuated over 150 families from La Paz and Sonsonate departments. The El Salvador government reported nine injuries, and 5,000 people in the country evacuated their residences; the majority of the evacuees was temporarily relocated to 55 shelters. Alex inflicted damage to 349 homes, 31 schools and 10 bridges, and 27 highways were compromised or blocked. In Guatemala, 350 homes and eight highways were damaged, affecting 9,000 people; 2,000 sought shelter in the country. A landslide was reported in a village in Santa Lucía Utatlán, along with flooding in Flores. Corn, bean, and potato crops were damaged in Suchitepéquez, San Marcos and Jutiapa departments. The National Emergency Management Organization of Belize reported that property damage in the country was minimal.

=== Gulf of Mexico ===
Tropical Storm Alex over the Gulf of Mexico

According to the Mexican government, Alex stopped the production of 420,000 barrels (67,000 m^{3}) of oil per day from the Gulf of Mexico, which corresponds to a quarter of the country's total oil production. Pemex evacuated 66 personnel from oil rigs offshore of Tamaulipas and Veracruz, Petrobras evacuated its oil rig in the Gulf, while Royal Dutch Shell evacuated 930 personnel from its rigs in the area. In total, six rigs and 69 production platforms faced evacuations, causing 21% of U.S. Gulf oil output and 14% of U.S. Gulf natural-gas flows to remain offline.

The storm was expected to impact operations regarding the Deepwater Horizon Oil Spill, with both containment and cleanup operations being affected by repercussions from the storm (such as wave action and wind direction). Although Alex stayed relatively away from the site, the storm caused BP to delay plans to increase oil capture from the leak by a week. Tarballs from the spill as large as apples washed onshore around Grand Isle, as well as other parts of Louisiana, Alabama and Florida, from high storm tides created by the hurricane.

=== Southern Mexico ===
In Chiapas, one person from Guatemala died and four others were injured when their bus rolled over as it traveled over a damaged highway. The state's civil defense system reported that 984 families from 17 municipalities were evacuated to shelters, and that Alex's torrential rainfall also produced 23 landslides in six counties of the state. On June 30, a mudslide knocked down a tree onto a 115-kV transmission line near El Vergel, causing 82 cities and towns in the municipalities of Villaflores and Villa Corzo to lose power; 32,000 residents were left without electricity from this outage alone. Power was restored the same evening. In Yucatán, a boat carrying seven passengers capsized; all were eventually rescued. In Campeche, 937 dwellings suffered minor damage as a result of the storm.

Prior to its second landfall, Alex caused one death in the state of Oaxaca when a wall collapsed on a dwelling in San Juan Chapultepec, killing the woman who was sleeping inside. Near San Francisco Ixhuatán, the Ostuta river breached its banks, flooding 1,000 homes. Farther upstream, in Reforma de Pineda, over 100 families were affected by the river's rise, which flooded their homes with 3.3 ft (1 m) of water. Overall, 3,500 families were affected by the storm in the state.

The outer rainbands of Alex caused three deaths in Acapulco, Guerrero, after a retaining wall collapsed over the occupants of an improvised shack in a vacant lot. The investigation that followed found that the wall had been built without structural enforcements, and that the torrential rainfall had weakened the wall's foundation.

=== Northeastern Mexico ===
Alex moving inland over northeastern Mexico on July 1

The storm's most significant effect in Northeastern Mexico was excessive rainfall, which was reported throughout the region. In Tamaulipas, between 3.829 to 12.421 in (97.25 to 315.5 mm) of precipitation were reported at weather stations statewide. In Nuevo León, an average of 9.5 in (242 mm) of rain was reported statewide up to July 1. The pluviometer at Estanzuela reported that a total of 35 in (890 mm) of rainfall were recorded; in Arroyo Seco, in San Pedro Garza García, a total of 23.1 in (588 mm) of precipitation was recorded between June 29 and 6 a.m. on July 1. Other rainfall stations in Monterrey recorded between 14.163 and 24.370 in (359.75 and 619 mm) of rain, while Santa Catarina recorded 23.297 in (591.75 mm) of precipitation. The Comisión Nacional del Agua (CNA) noted that the storm rainfall totals greatly exceed the totals produced by Hurricane Gilbert in 1988, which only produced 11 in (280 mm) of rain in the city.

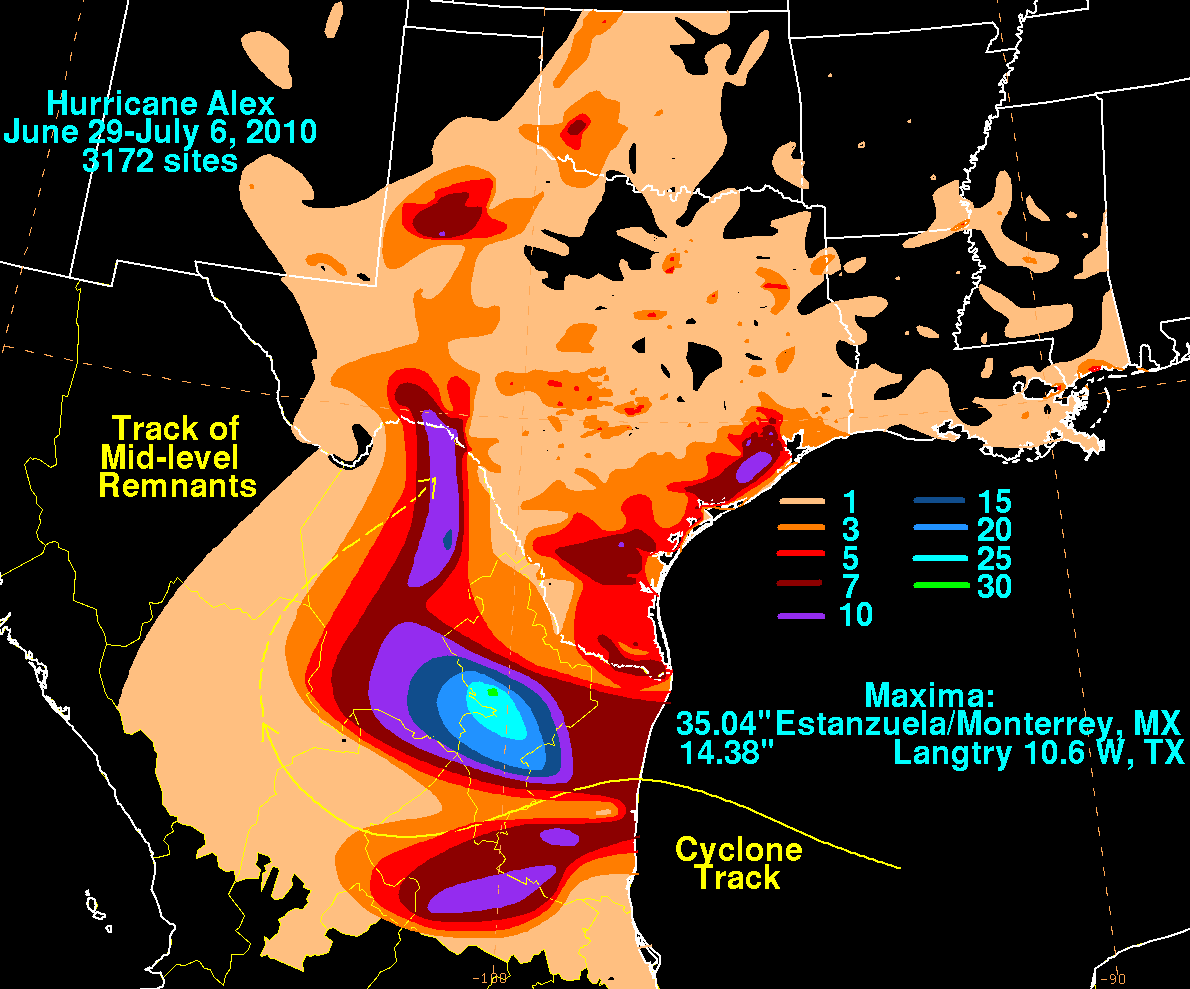
Storm total rainfall from Alex across northern Mexico and the western U.S. Gulf coast

The historic rainfall caused several dams to fill throughout northeast Mexico. In Nuevo León, due to the heavy rainfall, CNA also began water discharges of 25,200 cubic feet per second (713 m^{3}/s) from the La Boca Dam in Santiago, 58,200 cu ft/s (1,648 m^{3}/s) from Cerro Prieto in Linares, and 109,000 cu ft/s (3,080 m^{3}/s) from Cuchillo Dam in China; the dams were at 98%, 114%, and 124% of operating maximum capacity, respectively. Cuchillo Dam saw water inflows of 145,400 cu ft/s (4,118 m^{3}/s). The water releases from these dams raised a state of alert in Tamaulipas, which was slated to receive the discharged water. In Coahuila, the rainfall caused La Frakcjhuto release 35,000 cu ft/s (1,000 m^{3}/s) of water into the Rio Grande, and Amistad Dam to reach 119% of normal operating capacity. In the case of the latter dam, the excess storage in Amistad Lake sparked fears of flooding in downstream municipalities, although the possibility of overtopping of the dam was discarded by the Mexican section of the International Boundary and Water Commission. However, contingency plans were put in place to prepare for the crest of the Sabinas River, a tributary of the Rio Grande, and the subsequent crest on the Rio Grande itself, which was expected to carry at least 140,000 cu ft/s (4,000 m^{3}/s) due to additional inflows from other tributaries. At one point, the Rio Grande was clocked at 195,000 cu ft/s (5,530 m^{3}/s) due to its many flooded tributaries. The river's rise forced the evacuation of 40 families in Piedras Negras, and required the closure of the Gateway to the Americas International Bridge and Colombia–Solidarity International Bridge between Nuevo Laredo, Tamaulipas and Laredo, Texas on July 8. The bridges were expected to be closed until at least July 10. The rise of the Escondido River forced the evacuation of 1,000 families in Villa de Fuente, as the river rose to carry 23,000 cu ft/s (650 m^{3}/s) through the town.

The rainfall also caused Venustiano Carranza Dam in Coahuila to fill completely; the large water pressure in the dam forced the dam's gates shut, and cranes were employed to open them. The rest of the gates were unable to be opened due to lack of electrical power, sparking fears of a potential dam overtopping or rupture. The municipality of Anáhuac in Nuevo León was evacuated after reports early on July 6 that the dam had overtopped; Anáhuac's municipal president stated that the flood could cause the "total destruction" of the city. On July 7, as water releases from the dam were increased to 120,000 cu ft/s (3,300 m^{3}/s), the town was reported to be 9.8 ft (3 m) underwater, with more discharge expected. Personnel from the Mexican Army and the city's prison population were evacuated from Anáhuac that same day. In San Luis Potosí, the rainfall from Alex was beneficial, as it caused increases in dam water levels of up to 20% in very dry areas.

==== Tamaulipas ====
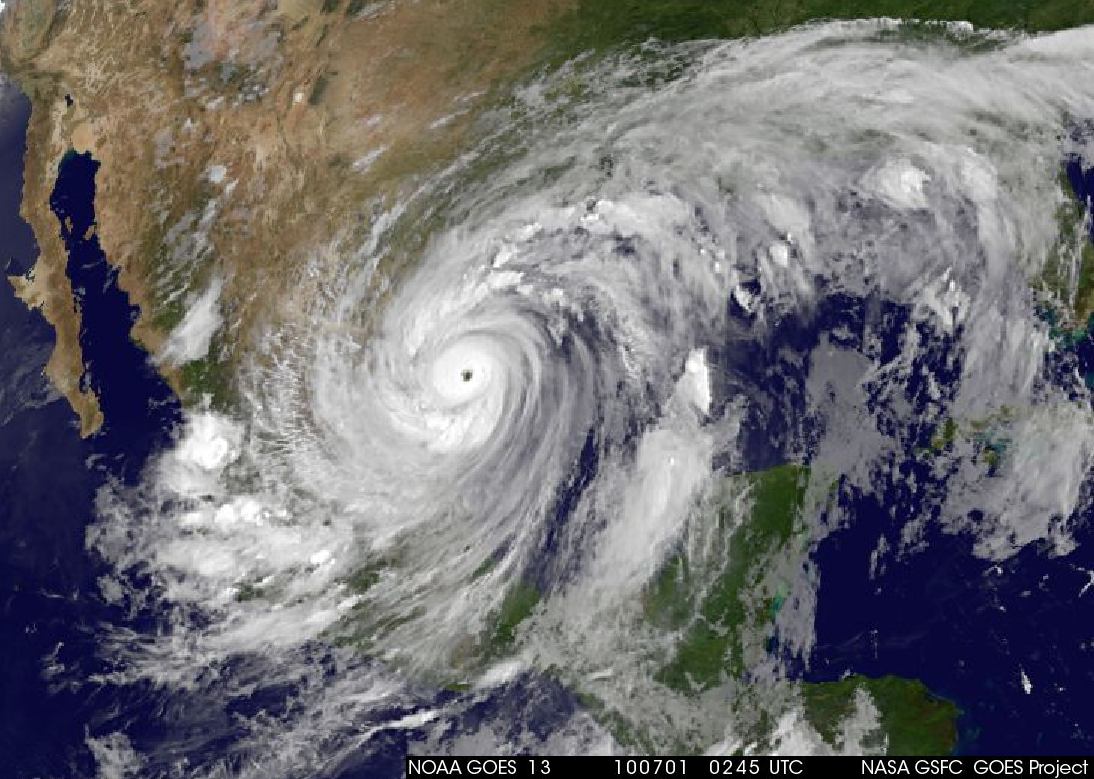
Alex shortly before moving ashore

Along the coast, 13 ft (4 m) waves were reported when the storm came ashore. Following the hurricane's landfall in Tamaulipas, a 25-year-old man was rescued from a storm drain. 60,000 people in San Fernando lost power, as did all of Ciudad Victoria, the capital of the state. Throughout the state, 256,000 people were left without electricity. Heavy winds and rainfall knocked down billboards and trees in the capital, but no injuries were reported in the city. The storm dropped 10 inches (250 mm) of rainfall in Matamoros, flooding 120 colonias, and leaving six of the 120 underwater. About 400 neighborhoods of Matamoros, comprising 80% of the city, were flooded. Some areas of the city were under 1 ft (0.30 m) of water, forcing 4,000 people to shelters. In Reynosa, 80 colonias were flooded, and 15 trees were uprooted; in Río Bravo, seven neighborhoods were flooded. In Nuevo Laredo, three young persons were rescued from a flooded arroyo. The San Fernando River also breached its banks, flooding communities in San Fernando and Méndez. The overflow of the Rio Grande following water discharges from Nuevo León isolated two communities in Miguel Alemán. One death was reported in the state on July 7 when a man died while trying to cross a flooded river.

Throughout the state, the storm and resultant floods damaged at least 6,000 homes, 202 schools, and 500 businesses. Additionally, 28 roadways and bridges were damaged, and left over 193,000 power consumers lost electric service. Property damage was placed at $1.084 billion (2010 MXN; US$83.8 million) in the 19 municipalities of the state that were declared federal disaster areas.

==== Nuevo León ====
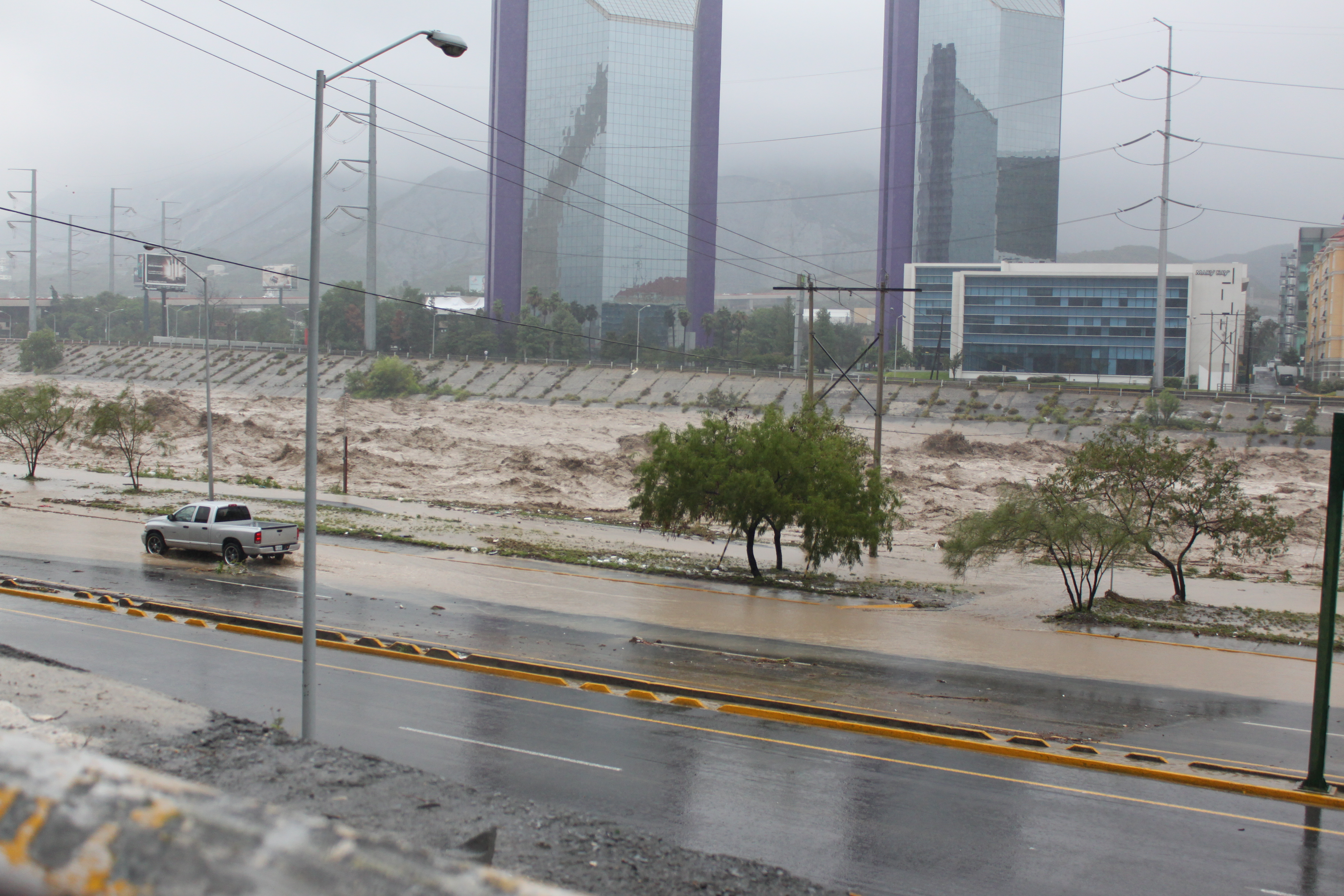
Santa Catarina River flooding through Monterrey, Nuevo León

In Nuevo León, fifteen people were confirmed to have died: one bricklayer who died after a housing unit under construction collapsed on top of him; two men and a woman who died after their vehicle rolled over and crashed into a semi-trailer truck due to the intense rainfall; a 25-year-old who was swept away by swift currents and pinned against a fence; an elderly man who died after a wall toppled over him, a woman who died after a large boulder from a rock slide fell on her home, and a young man who fell onto the Arroyo Topo Chico. Eight more bodies were found after floodwaters began receding, although one is believed to have been washed away from a cemetery. Twenty people in Nuevo León were reported missing.

According to the Comisión Federal de Electricidad, 4,000 customers lost electric power in the Monterrey metropolitan area, as did 61,000 people statewide. 18 wells lost power, leaving 110,000 without water service in the municipalities of Santa Catarina and García. Heavy flooding occurred along the Santa Catarina River in Monterrey, normally a dry river bed that flows into the Rio Grande, causing it to reach a record flow of 88,000 cu ft/s (2,500 m^{3}/s). The flooded stream washed away multiple parked vehicles, a popular flea market, and sport facilities built within a riverside greenway. The Santa Catarina River also destroyed about 45 kilometres (28 mi) of Monterrey's main arterial streets. Multiple washouts caused the closure of the divided highway between Monterrey and Saltillo, Coahuila. In San Nicolás de los Garza, the Arroyo Topo Chico exceeded its banks, forcing multiple street closures. An explosion and fire occurred on a bridge in the Guadalupe municipality when a transformer fell on an old gas pipe. No injuries were reported due to the fire. In Linares, the rainfall from Alex's remnants caused a wing of the municipal townhouse, which was built in 1896, to collapse. The building was listed as a protected historic building. A bridge on the Pilón River collapsed in Montemorelos, rupturing a 24-inch oil pipeline in the process. However, the valves on both ends of the pipeline section were closed, minimizing the leak over the river, and the leak was not expected to adversely impact drinking water supplies in El Cuchillo Dam. Hurricane Alex affected the infrastructure of 1,077 schools in the state, 60 of which were severely damaged and 552 held intermediate damage. Nationwide disruption in Internet connection and cell phone services was caused by damage to optical fibers, backbone nodes and telephonic central stations in Monterrey. Additionally, Telefónica reported damage to its network in Monterrey and Saltillo, causing intermittent unavailability of telecommunication services. Preliminary estimates of the damage in the state rose to $10 billion (2010 MXN; US$762 million); final damage estimates released on August 5 totaled $16.9 billion (2010 MXN; US$1.35 billion) statewide.

==== Coahuila ====
In Coahuila, rainfall from Alex's remnants caused a small dam in an ejido in Castaños to overtop, forcing the evacuation of 50 people in the municipality's seat. The ensuing flood rose 3.3 ft (1 m) and damaged 15 homes. The coal-producing region of the state was left isolated after the Álamos River broke its banks. Hundreds of residents in Nueva Rosita and Sabinas were evacuated; in the latter case, the Sabinas River flooded to become 980 ft (300 m) in width, causing 400–500 homes to go underwater. Some bridges on Mexican Federal Highway 57 were covered in water. Thousands of citizens in Ciudad Acuña were evacuated when the Arroyo Las Vacas flooded after 40 in (1,000 mm) of rain fell on nearby mountain ranges. The flood damaged 1,000 homes, damaging urban infrastructure, power, water and telecommunication services; 500 people sought refuge in shelters. The loss of power caused 40 maquiladoras to suspend their activities, stopping 16,000 workers. The rainfall caused damage in 15 municipalities of Coahuila, affecting 10,000 people, and causing at least $1 billion (2010 MXN; US$76 million) in damage in the state.

=== United States ===
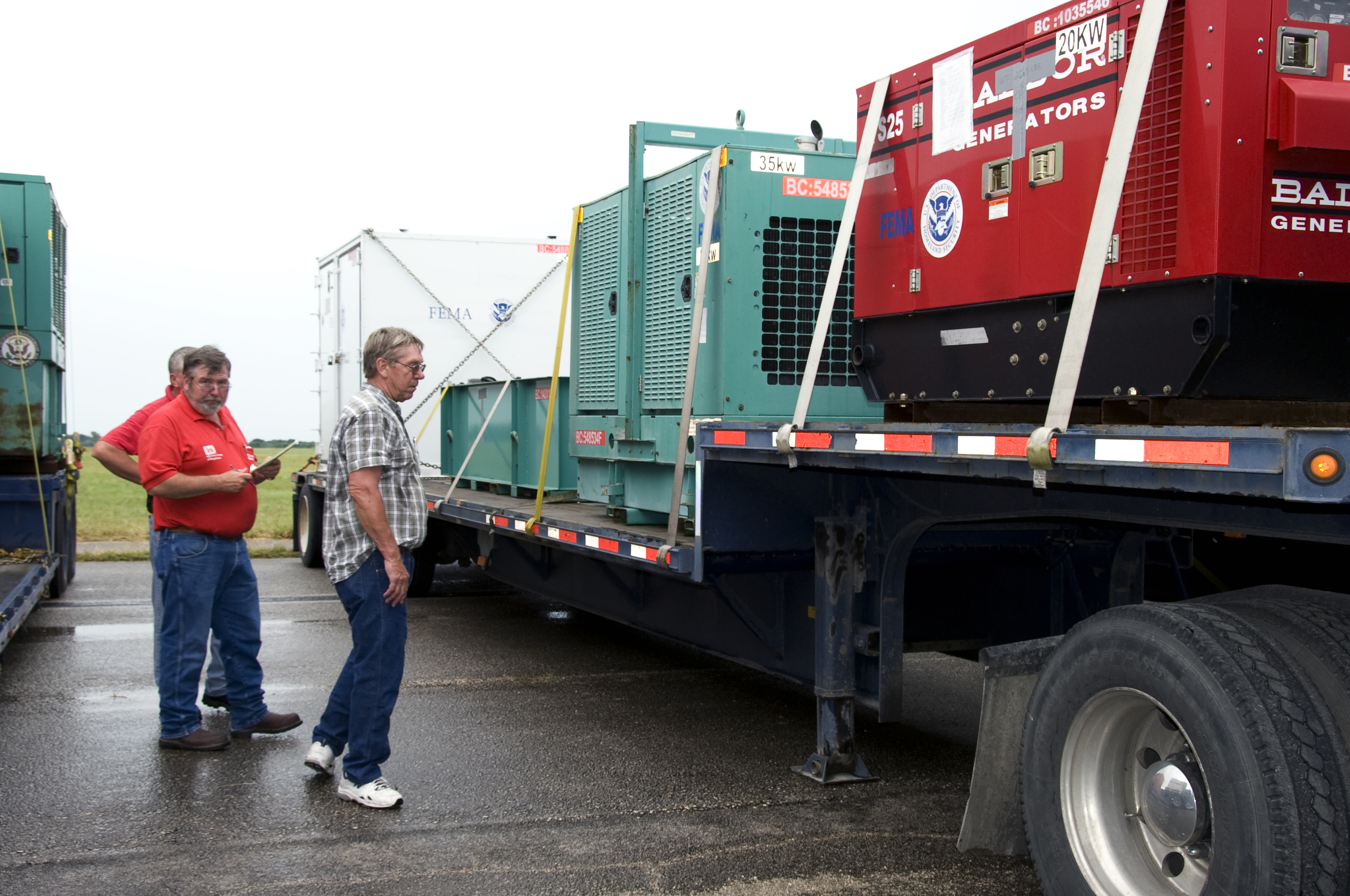
Trucks carrying emergency FEMA generators were dispatched in response to Alex.

In southern Texas, the feeder bands on the northern side of the hurricane began producing tropical-storm-force winds throughout Cameron, Willacy and Kenedy Counties starting on June 30. The highest reported sustained wind was of 51 mph (82 km/h) at the southeast tip of Port Isabel. The strongest gust occurred over the Queen Isabella Causeway, where a wind speed of 66 mph (106 km/h) was measured. Sustained winds of 39 mph (63 km/h) and gusts of 53 mph (85 km/h) were measured in Bayview.

The feeder bands also produced heavy rainfall, leading to flooding on South Padre Island. A storm surge of 3.5 feet (1.1 m) was reported on the island, causing moderate beach erosion. However, more significant damage was avoided as the bulk of the 4 feet (1.2 m) storm tide hit South Padre and Port Isabel at low tide. Nine tornadoes were confirmed to have touched down in the state in association with the storm, one of which overturned a mobile home. Other tornadoes caused mainly minimal damages to trees and shrubbery. About 9,000 customers lost power throughout Texas.

Large amounts of precipitation fell throughout the Lower Rio Grande Valley, with 6 to 9 inches (150 to 230 mm) of rainfall recorded throughout the region. Brownsville Airport had 6.80 inches (173 mm) of precipitation in a 36-hour period. The 5.86 inches (149 mm) of rain that fell alone on June 30 broke the daily rainfall record of 3.80 inches (97 mm) from 1995. McAllen, Texas, measured 6.66 inches (169 mm) of rain on June 30, which now constitutes the city's wettest June day on record. In Houston, more rain fell on the first two days of July than the average rainfall for the entire month of July. Some parts of the city received nearly 12 inches (300 mm) of rain over three days, causing scattered street flooding.

Flooding caused by the rainfall from the remnants of Alex caused the Rio Grande at Foster Ranch, in far western Texas, to exceed 31 ft (9.4 m), well above the flood stage at 14 ft (4.3 m) and the record stage at 25.9 ft (7.9 m). Combined with the rainfall produced by Tropical Depression Two, the Rio Grande was under flood conditions for much of the month of July. About $10 million (2010 USD) of agricultural damage was reported in Hidalgo County from Alex.

== Aftermath and records ==
=== Government response ===
Following the storm's final landfall, Mexico's Secretariat of National Defense deployed 800 troops to Nuevo León and Tamaulipas under Plan DN-III-E to help aid operations. The troops enforced mandatory evacuations of 3,337 residents of San Fernando and Soto la Marina in Tamaulipas. Throughout Nuevo León, 60,000 people were evacuated from their homes. In Tamaulipas, 263,000 people were affected by Hurricane Alex, and 2,260 homes were flooded. In Coahuila, 80,000 were affected by Alex's remnants, leaving 30% of the municipalities of the state without communication with the outside world. 20,000 were considered total losses, most of them in Sabinas. Approximately 500,000 people were affected by floods throughout northeastern Mexico.

The Secretaría de Gobernación declared a state of emergency in 21 of Nuevo León's 51 municipalities, freeing federal disaster funds for use in aid operations. An additional 10 municipalities were placed under the state of emergency on July 8. A similar declaration was made for 8 municipalities in Oaxaca, and for 14 municipalities in Tamaulipas; the state of emergency in Tamaulipas was later expanded to 30 municipalities. Mexican President Felipe Calderón requested adding resources to the federal disaster fund, as the $3 billion (2010 MXN; US$235 million) it held would not be sufficient to face the damage in Coahuila, Nuevo León and Tamaulipas. In the months following the storm, a total of $4.8 billion (2010 MXN; US$375 million) was released by the federal and state governments to aid in the reconstruction of the disaster areas in Nuevo León and Tamaulipas. In Texas, Governor Rick Perry activated the state's search and rescue capabilities in Laredo and San Antonio. This activation was due to the flooding on the Rio Grande Valley, which was expected to worsen due to the approach of Tropical Depression Two to the area affected by Alex.

Even after its dissipation, Alex continued causing deaths throughout Mexico, particularly due to flooding. One death was reported in Tamaulipas and another one in San Luis Potosí; another six were reported to have died in Guanajuato as a result of Alex. In Coahuila, eight people died after a plane crashed while surveying the water discharges from dams in the state; the Coahuila secretary of public works and the municipal president of Piedras Negras were among the victims.

=== Infrastructure ===
The storm caused severe devastation in Nuevo León, and in particular throughout the Monterrey metropolitan area. State governor Rodrigo Medina de la Cruz noted that the city of Monterrey had "collapsed due to the worst weather phenomenon in its history." In the municipality of Santa Catarina alone, 50,000 people were affected, with property damage being estimated at $1.2 billion (2010 MXN; US$93.5 million). Residents from three colonias in García had to be permanently relocated as 800 homes were destroyed; the storm caused $900 million (2010 MXN; US$70 million) in damage in the municipality. The flooding Santa Catarina River destroyed four bridges in Monterrey; at least 60 bridges were damaged statewide. Governor Medina also announced on July 3 the allocation of $1.4 billion (2010 MXN; US$107 million) for repairs to Monterrey's arterial streets. Municipalities in the metropolitan area used contraflow during part of the day to re-establish traffic in sections where the arterial streets bordering the Santa Catarina River were damaged only in one direction. The repairs to Monterrey's main roadways were estimated to take up to three months to complete.

Railway traffic throughout the state was paralyzed, as some train bridges collapsed, and extensive damage was found in the track ballast in multiple rail lines. Kansas City Southern Railway reported it expected a net loss of five cents per share on its annual earnings due to the stoppage affecting its Mexican subsidiary. The company later reported a drop of $33 million (2010 USD) in revenue due to hurricane damage. The damage to the railway infrastructure caused automotive part shortages throughout North America. General Motors was forced to cancel shifts at plants in Michigan, Missouri and Kansas. Ford also idled production in its Oakville, Ontario assembly plant, and suffered two-week delays in U.S. deliveries of its Fiesta model due to the rail track damage. The damage to the road system paralyzed a route used by 40% of the trade between the United States and Mexico, as 22,000 trucks were stalled after damage to the Nuevo Laredo–Monterrey highway.

Alex destroyed the potable water infrastructure in portions of Nuevo León, causing widespread shortages of water. The damage to the water infrastructure was described as being of "unexpected magnitude," with 160,000 left without water a week after the storm made landfall. The standing water left following the rainfall caused concern of outbreaks of various diseases, including cholera. Consequently, the population was warned to boil or otherwise disinfect water to prevent disease. In areas where the storm's impact made it difficult to boil water due to the unavailability of gas or stoves, 70,000 jars with colloidal silver were distributed. Additionally, laboratory testing of refuse coming from individuals with gastrointestinary illnesses commenced as a precaution to identify outbreaks of cholera and other diseases, and over 82,000 vaccines were applied throughout the region. Following the storm's passage, PROFECO announced fines of up to $2.5 million (2010 MXN; US$191,000) to merchants guilty of price gouging when selling bottled water. This occurred after the agency received complaints of 1500% markups when compared to bottled water's pre-storm price. On July 7, the agency announced it had applied sanctions to 20 businesses who were found overcharging for bottled water.

=== Economic and environmental effects ===
According to estimates from the Mexican Secretariat of Agriculture, Livestock, Rural Development, Fisheries and Food (SAGARPA), 504,000 acres (203,800 ha) of farmland were damaged as a result from Alex in northeastern Mexico, corresponding to 11% of the total farmland in Tamaulipas, Nuevo León and Coahuila. Most of the agricultural damage occurred in Tamaulipas, where 270,000 acres (110,000 ha) of sorghum and 200,000 acres (80,000 ha) of maize were damaged, corresponding to 15.6% of the entirety of the state's farmland, and 76% of the state's maize crop; 1,700 acres (700 ha) of grapefruit and limes were also damaged, corresponding to 15% of the state's citrus production. Two thousand heads of cattle were also lost in Nuevo Laredo. In Nuevo León and Coahuila, most of the damage was to animal husbandry; in Nuevo León, 3,645 heads of cattle, 3,580 goats, 7,265 sheep and 194 horses were lost, while in Coahuila, 3,709 goats, 258 cattle and 56 sheep were killed.

The storm also affected commerce throughout the region. The Mexican Secretariat of Economy calculated that Alex affected 2,500 small and medium enterprises in Nuevo León, 500 in Tamaulipas, and 500–700 in Coahuila. In Monterrey, the local chapter of the Confederation of National Chambers of Commerce reported that in the first two days after Hurricane Alex affected the city, businesses in the city lost $750 million (2010 MXN; US$58 million). Overall, the lost business due to Alex is expected to total about $2 billion (2010 MXN; US$156 million).

As floodwaters receded from the Pesquería River in Escobedo, Nuevo León, the remnants of a 15,000-year-old mammoth were discovered by local residents. It is believed that the remains were carried from the state of Coahuila to Escobedo by the floodwaters. The remnants were identified and dated by personnel from the Instituto Nacional de Antropología e Historia.

=== Records ===
Alex equaled the lowest recorded barometric pressure for a June Atlantic hurricane set by Hurricane Audrey in 1957. It was also the first June Atlantic hurricane since Hurricane Allison in 1995, and the strongest in terms of sustained wind speed since Hurricane Alma in 1966.

== See also ==
- Other storms named Alex
- Timeline of the 2010 Atlantic hurricane season
