= Estrella Rojas Loreto =

Mexican lawyer and politician

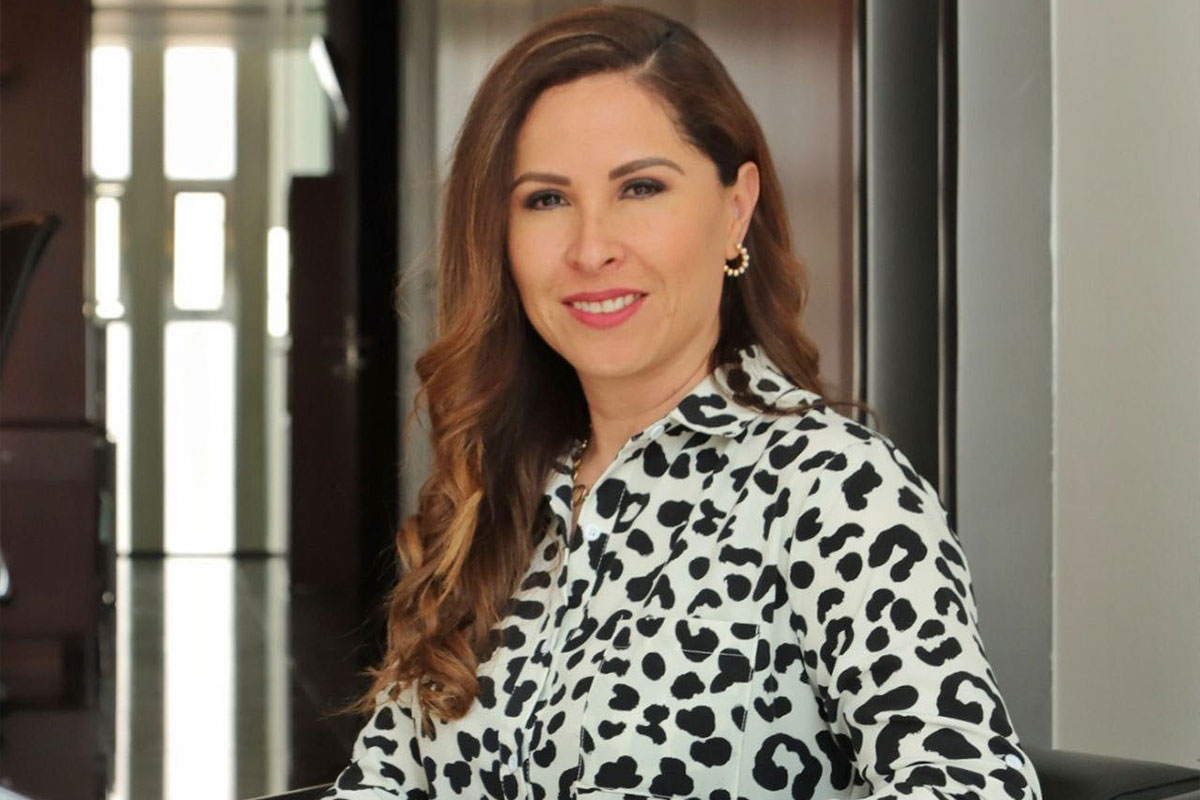

Senator of the Republic from Querétaro Second formula
- In office 13 September 2021 – 31 August 2024
- Preceded by: Guadalupe Murguía Gutiérrez
- Succeeded by: Agustín Dorantes Lámbarri

Personal details
- Born: December 30, 1982 (age 43)
- Party: National Action Party
- Education: UAQ; Universidad Camilo José Cela
- Occupation: Lawyer; Politician

Estrella Rojas Loreto (born December 30, 1982) is a Mexican lawyer and politician affiliated with the National Action Party (PAN). She is currently an acting senator representing the state of Querétaro after the leave to separate from the position of Guadalupe Murguía Gutiérrez to assume the Secretary of Government of the state of Querétaro as part of the cabinet of Mauricio Kuri González.

== Career ==
=== Academic ===
She completed a law degree at the Autonomous University of Querétaro (UAQ) from 2000 to 2005. She studied the specialty in corporate law at UAQ in 2006. She later studied a master's degree in law at UAQ from 2006 to 2008. Finally, she completed a master's degree in image consulting and political consulting at the Camilo José Cela University from 2015 to 2017 in Spain.
