= Botello =

Botello is a surname. Notable people with the surname include:

- Ángel Botello (1913–1986), Spanish-Puerto Rican painter
- Feliciano de la Mota Botello (1769–1830), Argentine politician
- Javier Botello (born 1976), Spanish swimmer
- Jose Botello (born 1976), American soccer player
- José Alfredo Botello (born 1956), Mexican politician
- Kate Botello, American television personality
- Narciso Botello (c. 1815–1889), American politician
