= 3rd federal electoral district of Querétaro =

Federal electoral district of Mexico

Querétaro's 3rd
- Electoral district of the Chamber of Deputies of Mexico

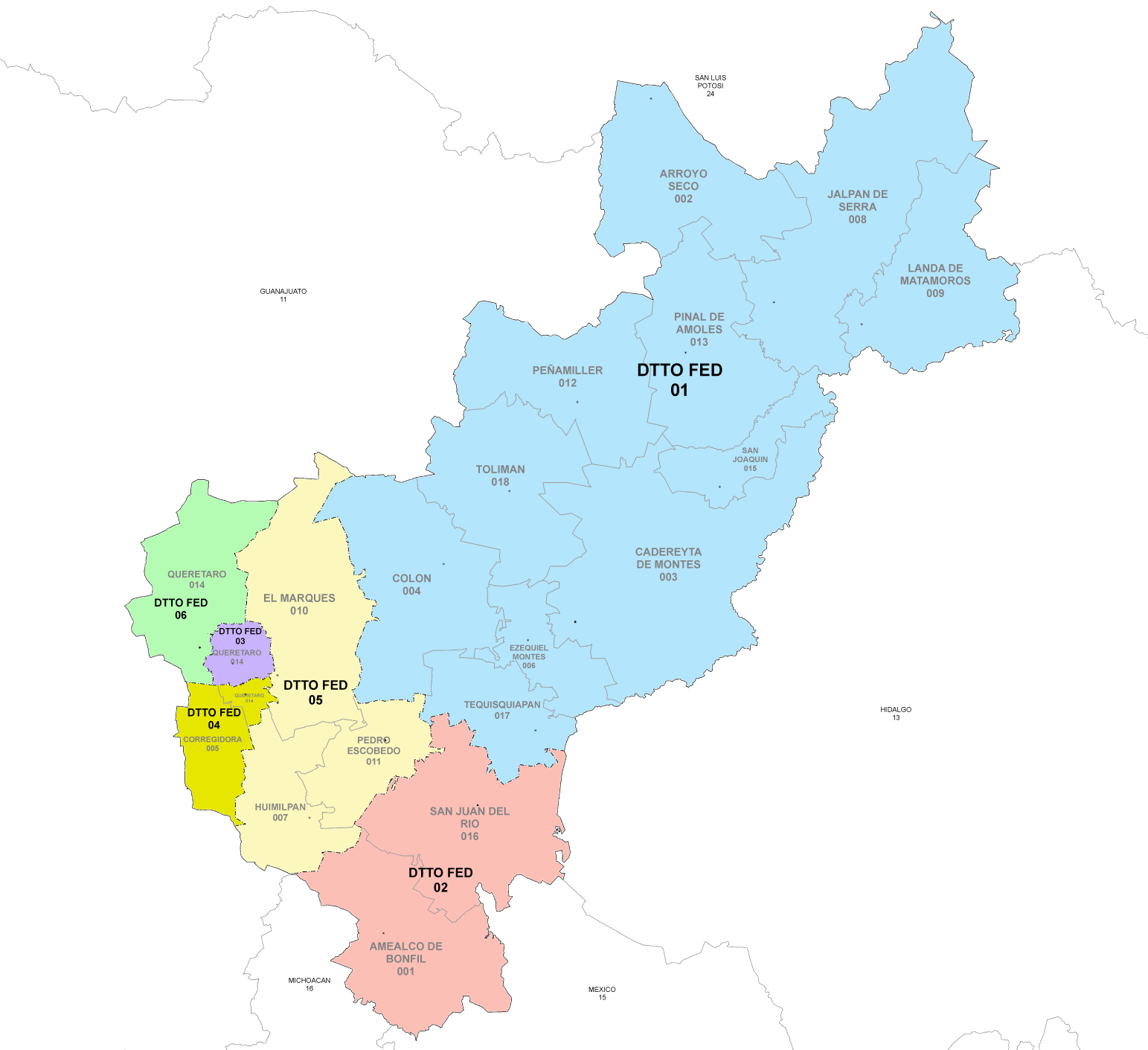
- 3rd district since 2023

Incumbent
- Member: Lorena García Jimeno Alcocer
- Party: ▌National Action Party
- Congress: 66th (2024–2027)

District
- State: Querétaro
- Head town: Santiago de Querétaro
- Coordinates: 20°35′N 100°23′W
- Covers: Municipality of Querétaro (part)
- PR region: Fifth
- Precincts: 185
- Population: 420,281 (2020 census)

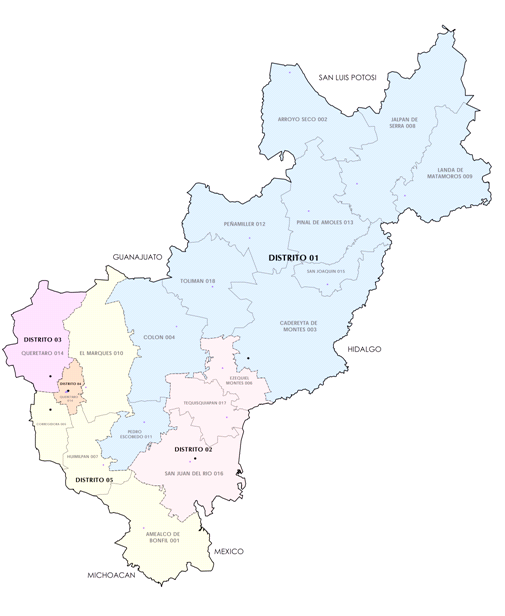
Querétaro under the 2017–2022 districting plan

The 3rd federal electoral district of Querétaro (Spanish: Distrito electoral federal 03 de Querétaro) is one of the 300 electoral districts into which Mexico is divided for elections to the federal Chamber of Deputies and one of six such districts in the state of Querétaro.

It elects one deputy to the lower house of Congress for each three-year legislative session by means of the first-past-the-post system. Votes cast in the district also count towards the calculation of proportional representation ("plurinominal") deputies; since 2024, those elected from the fifth region.

Suspended in 1930, (Note: An amendment to Article 52 of the Constitution in 1928 changed the original provision of "one deputy per 60,000 inhabitants" to "one deputy per 100,000"; as a result, the size of the Chamber of Deputies fell from 281 in the 1928 election to 171 in 1934.) the 3rd district was re-established by the 1977 electoral reforms, which increased the number of single-member seats in the Chamber of Deputies from 196 to 300. Under those reforms, Querétaro's seat allocation rose from two to three. The new district was first contested in the 1979 mid-term election.

The current member for the district, elected in the 2024 general election, is Lorena García Jimeno Alcocer of the National Action Party (PAN).

== District territory ==
Under the 2023 districting plan adopted by the National Electoral Institute (INE), which assigned Querétaro an additional seat in Congress and is to be used for the 2024, 2027 and 2030 federal elections, the 3rd district covers 185 precincts (secciones electorales) across a portion of the municipality of Querétaro.

The head town (cabecera distrital), where results from individual polling stations are gathered together and tallied, is the state capital, Santiago de Querétaro. The district reported a population of 420,281 in the 2020 census.

== Previous districting schemes ==
Evolution of electoral district numbers
	1974	1978	1996	2005	2017	2023
Querétaro	2	3	4	4	5	6
Chamber of Deputies	196	300				

2017–2022

Between 2017 and 2022, when the state contained five federal electoral districts, the 3rd covered a portion of the municipality of Querétaro.

2005–2017

Under the 2005 plan, Querétaro had four districts. The 3rd district covered 165 precincts in the municipality of Querétaro.

1996–2005

In the 1996 scheme, which gave Querétaro its fourth congressional seat, the district comprised the northern part of the municipality of Querétaro, including the northern portion of the city.

1978–1996

The districting scheme in force from 1978 to 1996 was the result of the 1977 electoral reforms, which increased the number of single-member seats in the Chamber of Deputies from 196 to 300. Under that plan, Querétaro's seat allocation rose from two to three. The new 3rd district's head town was at El Marqués and it covered the municipalities of Arroyo Seco, Colón, Corregidora, El Marqués, Huimilpan, Jalpan, Landa, Peñamiller, Pinal de Amoles, San Joaquín and Tolimán.

== Deputies returned to Congress ==
(Mexico) National parties
- Current
- PAN
- PRI
- PT
- PVEM
- MC
- Morena
- PAZ
- Somos
- Defunct or local only
- PLM
- PNR
- PRM
- PNM
- PP
- PPS
- PARM
- PFCRN
- CON
- PANAL
- PSD
- PES
- PES
- PRD

Querétaro's 3rd district
Election	Deputy	Party	Term	Legislature
1916	José María Truchuelo		1916–1917	Constituent Congress of Querétaro
...
The 3rd district was suspended between 1930 and 1979
1979	Rodolfo Luis Monroy Sandoval	Institutional Revolutionary Party	1979–1982	51st Congress
1982	Ernesto Luque Feregrino	Institutional Revolutionary Party	1982–1985	52nd Congress
1985	Augusto Guerrero Castro	Institutional Revolutionary Party	1985–1988	53rd Congress
1988	Benjamín Edgardo Rocha Pedraza	Institutional Revolutionary Party	1988–1991	54th Congress
1991	José Guadalupe Martínez Martínez	Institutional Revolutionary Party	1991–1994	55th Congress
1994	Ernesto Luque Feregrino	Institutional Revolutionary Party	1994–1997	56th Congress
1997	Samuel Gustavo Villanueva García	National Action Party (Mexico)	1997–2000	57th Congress
2000	Francisco de Jesús de Silva Ruiz	National Action Party (Mexico)	2000–2003	58th Congress
2003	Guillermo Tamborrel Suárez	National Action Party (Mexico)	2003–2006	59th Congress
2006	María Jiménez del Castillo	National Action Party (Mexico)	2006–2008	60th Congress
2009	Alfredo Francisco Lugo Oñate	Institutional Revolutionary Party	2009–2012	61st Congress
2012	Marcos Aguilar Vega	National Action Party (Mexico)	2012–2015	62nd Congress
2015	Gerardo Gabriel Cuanalo Santos	National Action Party (Mexico)	2009–2012	63rd Congress
2018	Beatriz Robles Gutiérrez	National Regeneration Movement	2018–2021	64th Congress
2021	Ignacio Loyola Vera	National Action Party (Mexico)	2021–2024	65th Congress
2024	Lorena García Jimeno Alcocer	National Action Party (Mexico)	2024–2027	66th Congress

== Presidential elections ==
Querétaro's 3rd district
Election	District won by	Party or coalition	%
2018	Andrés Manuel López Obrador	Juntos Haremos Historia	46.0871
2024	Claudia Sheinbaum Pardo	Sigamos Haciendo Historia	48.4878
