= Francisco Garrido Patrón =

Mexican politician

Francisco Garrido
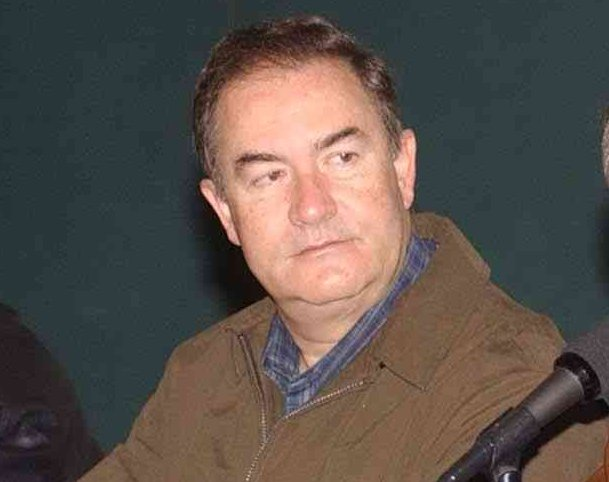

Governor of Querétaro
- In office 1 October 2003 – 30 September 2009
- Preceded by: Ignacio Loyola

Personal details
- Born: 1953 (age 72–73) Mexico City
- Party: National Action Party (PAN)
- Profession: Lawyer

Francisco Garrido Patrón (born 1953) is a Mexican politician who was Governor of Querétaro from 2003 to 2010, and member of the National Action Party (PAN). Previously, he was mayor of Querétaro City from 1 October 1997 to 30 September 2000. Under his government he constructed the “Acueducto II” which is the main source of water for Querétaro city, the “Centro de Congresos” of Querétaro, and the “Circuito Universidades”.

== See also ==
- List of Queretan governors
- List of current Mexican governors
- List of presidents of Querétaro Municipality

Preceded by Ignacio Loyola Vera	Governor of Querétaro; 2003–2009	Succeeded by José Calzada Rovirosa
Preceded by Jesús Rodríguez Hernández	Municipal President of Queretaro; 1997–2000	Succeeded by Rolando García Ortiz
