= María Isabella Cordero =

Mexican television anchorwoman

María Isabella Cordero Martínez
- Born: c. 1987
- Died: 16 April 2010 (aged 23); Chihuahua, Chihuahua, Mexico
- Cause of death: Drive-by shooting
- Other name: Isa
- Education: Autonomous University of Chihuahua
- Employer: Local branch of the CANACO
- Known for: Televisa anchorwoman

María Isabella Cordero Martínez (c. 1987 – 16 April 2010) was a Mexican television anchorwoman for a local Televisa channel in Chihuahua, Chihuahua, Mexico, and the spokeswoman and director of public relations for CANACO, Chihuahua's local Chamber of Commerce.

She was murdered by unidentified gunmen outside a restaurant in the capital city of Chihuahua on 16 April 2010. At the crime scene, the Mexican authorities discovered several shell casings from assault rifles, the habitual weapon of the Mexican organized crime groups. The motive of the killing, however, remains unknown.

== Early life and career ==
As a youth, Cordero completed her primary school education from Escuela Primaria Enrique Rebsamen, and then went on to middle school at the State Junior High Number 15. Upon graduation, she attended high school at an institution called III del Colegio de Bachilleres.

Before enrolling at the University of Chihuahua to study Accounting and Business administration, Cordero's mother suggested that she participate in a casting for a local television program hosted by Televisa. To her surprise, Cordero was selected from a pool of contestants to work as the anchorwoman for the television program. During her three-year career on Televisa, her show – although generally directed at housewives – attracted both men and women. After working for more than three years at Televisa, Cordero resigned to work as the director of public relations at the CANACO, Chihuahua city's Chamber of Commerce. Cordero also opened a small shirt printing business where she sold T-shirts and blouses with peace messages in response to the drug violence in her home state.

Cordero was about to graduate from the University of Chihuahua in June 2010 and was pursuing her graduate studies in the United States.

== Death ==
Mentioned locations within Mexico relative to the capital Mexico City.

On 16 April 2010, Cordero and her friend María Catalina Flores Aguayo (age 22) went out for dinner at a local restaurant in Chihuahua, Chihuahua when an armed commando opened fire at them from a moving vehicle at around 11:00 p.m., killing them instantly. Their bodies were found inside a parked white Renault Mégane near the corner of Bahía de San Quintín and Libertadores streets in the northern part of the capital city.

After the gunmen left the scene, witnesses dialed 060 and notified the Mexican authorities of the attack. The first to arrive were the Municipal police forces and then the Red Cross ambulances, which confirmed that the two women had died instantly from more than 20 gunshot wounds.

The shell casings found at the crime scene belonged to an assault rifle, which is a weapon often used by organized crime. But the motive behind the assassination remains unknown. It was rumored by people in Chihuahua that Cordero was dating someone involved in organized crime and was killed because of that. This information was not confirmed.

=== Funeral ===
The Cordero family held a wake for María Isabella at the Blas Perches funeral home and a mass ceremony conducted by Father Jesús José Mata Trejo at 3:00 p.m. at the Asunción de María temple. She was later buried at the La Colina de Chihuahua in the capital city by dozens of friends and family members on the afternoon of 18 April 2010.

== Context ==
With the death of Cordero, the death toll of journalists killed in Mexico in 2010 reached six. If the journalists killed since the year 2000 are counted, the number of journalists killed would be of more than 60, according to a report issued by Reporters Without Borders.

Cordero was killed in the state of Chihuahua in 2010, reported to be "the most violent state in Mexico" at that time. Almost one-third of all murders in the general population committed by the drug cartels during the Mexican drug war (between 2006 and 2010) happened in the state of Chihuahua. Chihuahua, and particularly the border city of Ciudad Juárez, was the epicenter of Mexico's drug war as the battle between the Sinaloa Cartel and Juárez Cartel left thousands of dead.

Since May 2008, Chihuahua had ranked at the top of the homicide list in the country. But by October 2012, the state of Guerrero surpassed Chihuahua as the state with the highest homicide rate in Mexico. The northern state of Nuevo León ranks third.
