= Antonio Calzada Urquiza =

Mexican architect and politician (1930–2019)

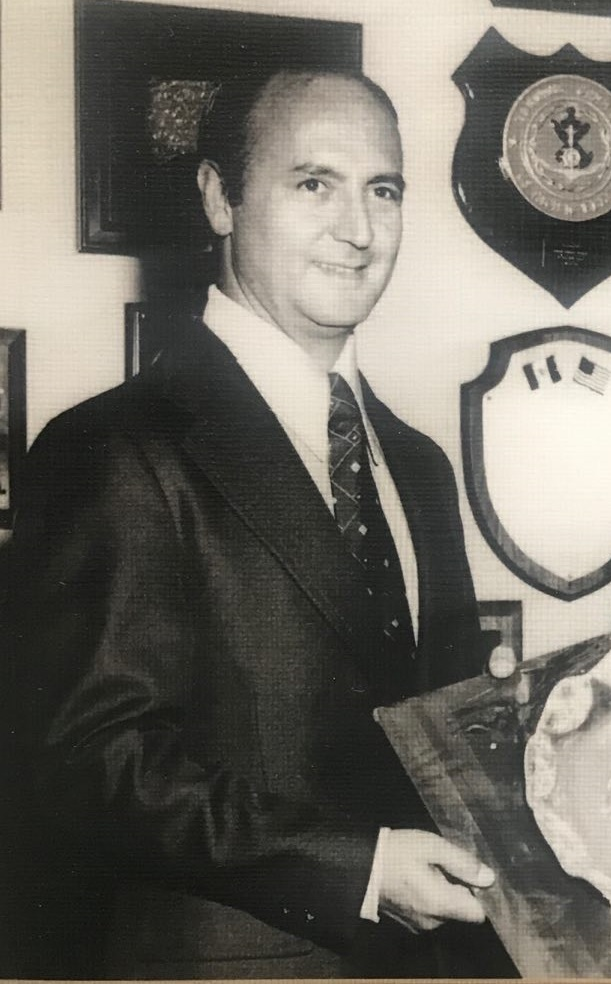

Antonio Calzada Urquiza (September 10, 1930, in Santiago de Querétaro – June 29, 2019) was a Mexican architect and politician. He was a member of the Institutional Revolutionary Party and served as the Governor of Querétaro from 1973 to 1979.

== Biography ==
He was born in the city of Querétaro on 10 September 1930 between José Calzada and Isabel Urquiza. His godfather was Don Agapito Pozo Balbás, who would lead in 1973 to the Superior Court better living memory of Querétaro, also composed of jurists huge Alcocer Antonio Perez, Fernando Diaz Ramirez and up young and talented Jorge Garcia Ramirez as a supernumerary judge acting to die Well Balbás. He received primary education in the Querétaro Institute and attended the middle and high school course in the Civil College of Querétaro. He studied at the faculty of architecture of the UNAM. From 1959 to 1965 he was the chairman of the board of materials improvement of Chetumal, Quintana Roo. From 1965 to 1970 he was a delegate of the IMSS in Querétaro. From 1970 to 1973 he was the mayor of the city of Querétaro and from 1973 to 1979 the governor of the state of Querétaro. During his term as governor, industrial growth began in Querétaro with the settling of American, Japanese, and Mexican companies (Grupo Chihuahua and Monterrey Group), as well as several hotels of renowned domestic and international chains; in the State Historical Archive Hall of Governors it was created with oil paintings of all the rulers of the state of Querétaro. In 1984 he was appointed as the ambassador of Mexico to Colombia. After a few years he returned to the state engaging in private activities. He died on 29 June 2019.

== Other ==
- Antonio Calzada earned 2-dan black belt for Taekwondo.
- His son José Calzada was elected Governor of Querétaro for the six years from 2009 to 2015.

Preceded by Juventino Castro Sánchez	governor of Querétaro; 1973–1979	Succeeded by Rafael Camacho Guzmán

== See also ==
- List of presidents of Querétaro Municipality
