= José Alfredo Botello =

Mexican politician and lawyer

José Alfredo Botello Montes
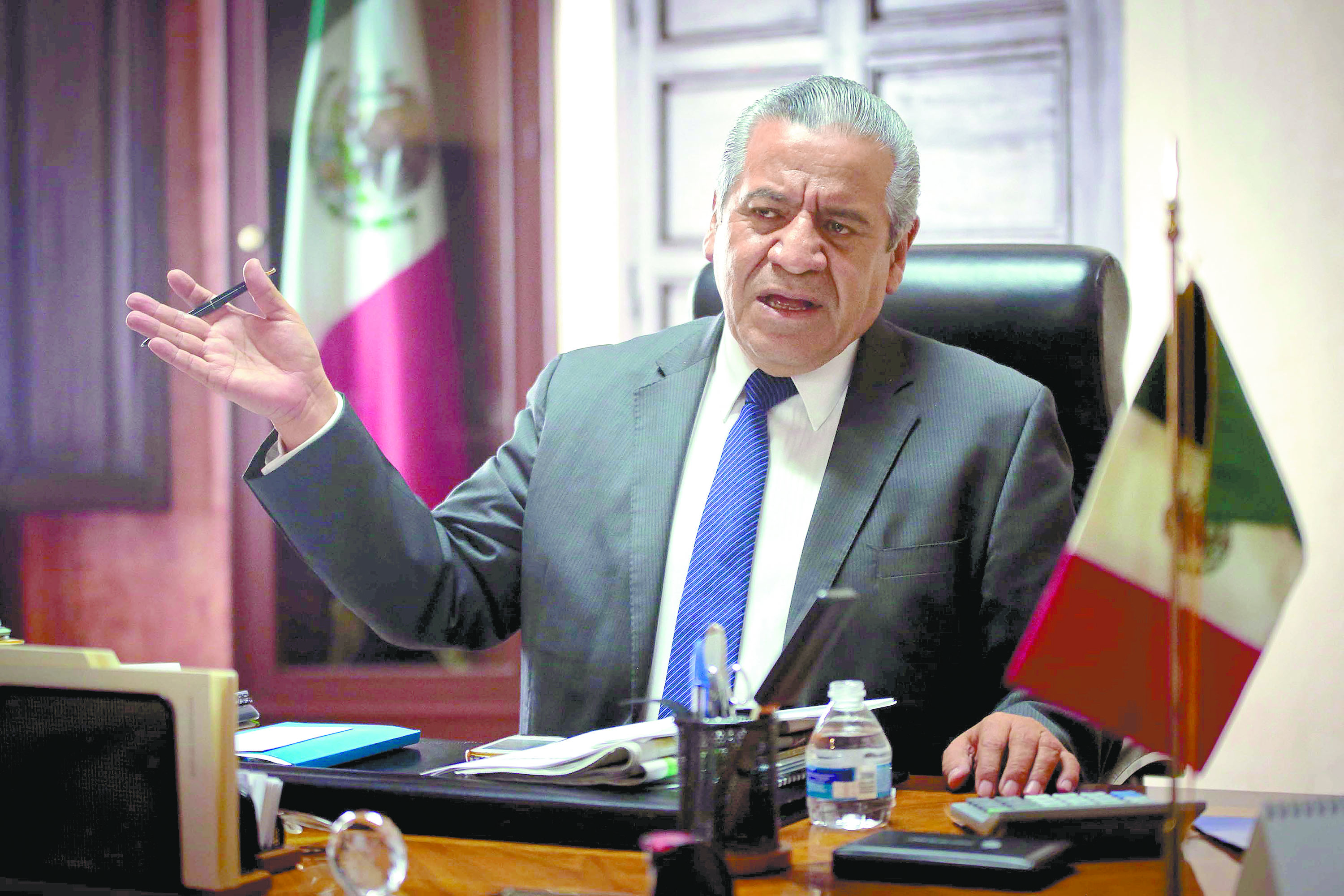

Senator of the Republic from Querétaro First formula
- In office 11 February 2021 – 31 August 2024
- Preceded by: Mauricio Kuri
- Succeeded by: Guadalupe Murguía Gutiérrez

Personal details
- Born: 7 December 1956 (age 69) Querétaro, Querétaro, Mexico
- Party: PAN
- Education: UAQ
- Occupation: Politician

José Alfredo Botello Montes (born 7 December 1956) is a Mexican politician and lawyer affiliated with the PAN. In the period of 2012–2015 he served as Deputy of the LXII Legislature of the Mexican Congress representing Querétaro. He now serves as Education Secretary in Querétaro's Government.

== Early years ==
José Alfredo Botello Montes was born on December 7, 1956, in Santiago de Querétaro, Mexico. In 1983 he studied law at the Universidad Autónoma de Querétaro and from 1989 to 1991 he taught constitutional law at the Instituto Tecnológico y de Estudios Superiores de Monterrey, Querétaro campus. He was founder and assistant director of the newspaper La Voz de Querétaro.
