= Francisco Fernández de Cevallos =

Mexican politician

Francisco Fernández de Cevallos Urueta

Senator for Querétaro
- In office 1 September 2000 – 31 August 2006
- Preceded by: Fernando Ortiz Arana
- Succeeded by: Guillermo Tamborrel Suárez

Personal details
- Born: 4 July 1947 (age 78) San Juan del Río, Querétaro, Mexico
- Died: 14 March 2009 (aged 61) Santiago de Querétaro, Querétaro, Mexico
- Party: PAN
- Spouse: Guillermina Ochoa Camacho
- Children: Francisco José, Guillermina y Paulina
- Education: Certified Public Accountant
- Occupation: Politician

Francisco Fernández de Cevallos y Urueta (born 4 July 1947) is a Mexican politician affiliated with the National Action Party. He served as Senator of the LVIII and LIX Legislatures of the Mexican Congress representing Querétaro.
