= Marcos Aguilar Vega =

Mexican politician

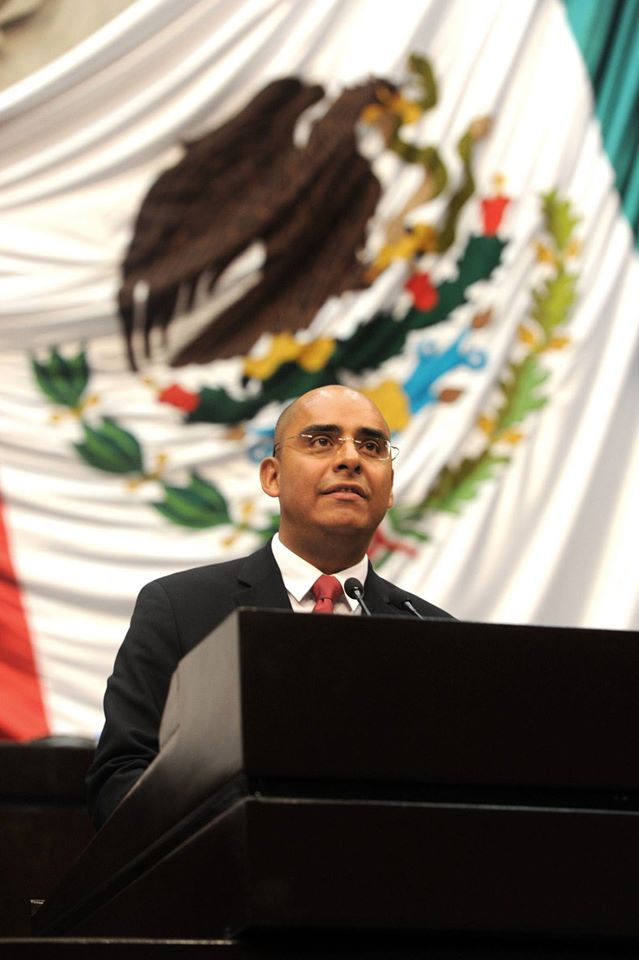
- Born: 5 July 1972 (age 53); Querétaro, Querétaro, Mexico
- Occupation: Deputy
- Political party: PAN

Marcos Aguilar Vega (born 5 July 1972) is a Mexican politician affiliated with the National Action Party (PAN). He served as a federal deputy in the 62nd Congress (2012–2015), representing Querétaro's third district.

Vega was born in Santiago de Querétaro. His legislative committee responsibilities included the Commission for Regime, Regulations, and Parliamentary Practices, Constitutional Points, Jurisdictional, Budget and Public Account, and Oversight of the Superior Auditor of the Federation.

== See also ==
- List of presidents of Querétaro Municipality
