= Alcocer (surname) =

Alcocer is a surname. Notable people with the surname include:

- Alberto Alcocer (born 1942), Spanish businessman
- Alberto Alcocer y Ribacoba (1886–1957), Spanish politician
- Alejandro González Alcocer (born 1951), Mexican politician
- Eduardo Quian Alcocer (born 1967), Mexican politician
- Érika Alcocer Luna (born 1974), Mexican singer
- Ignacio Alcocer (1870–1936), Mexican politician
- Jorge Alcocer Varela, Mexican healthcare professional
- José Miguel Guridi y Alcocer (1763–1828), Spanish-Mexican politician
- Juan Alcocer Flores (born 1955), Mexican politician
- Mariano Palacios Alcocer (born 1952), Mexican politician
- Máximo Alcócer (1933–2014), Bolivian footballer
- Raúl Molina Alcocer (born 1976), Spanish footballer
- Teresa Alcocer y Gasca (born 1952), Mexican politician
- Víctor Alcocer (1917–1984), Mexican actor
