= José Calzada =

Mexican politician

José Calzada Rovirosa
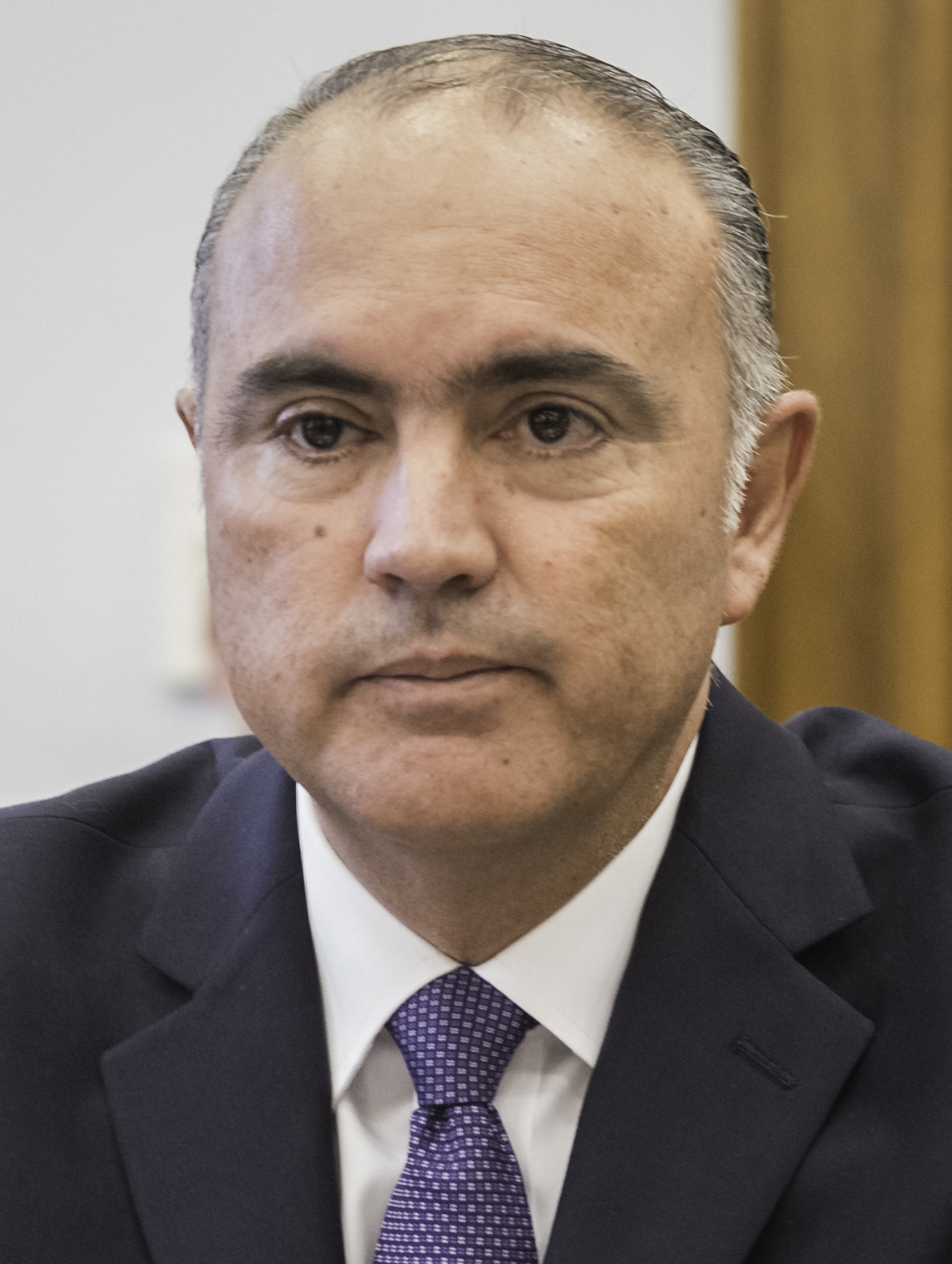
- Calzada Rovirosa in 2016

Secretary of Agriculture, Livestock, Rural Development, Fisheries and Food
- In office August 27, 2015 – November 30, 2018
- President: Enrique Peña Nieto
- Preceded by: Enrique Martínez y Martínez

26th Governor of Querétaro
- In office October 1, 2009 – August 27, 2015
- Preceded by: Francisco Garrido Patrón
- Succeeded by: Jorge López Portillo Tostado (interim)

Member of the Senate of the Republic
- In office September 1, 2006 – March 17, 2009
- Preceded by: Miguel Calzada Mercado
- Succeeded by: Ma. del Socorro García Quiróz

Personal details
- Born: August 21, 1964 (age 61) Santiago de Querétaro, Mexico
- Party: Institutional Revolutionary Party

José Eduardo Calzada Rovirosa (born August 21, 1964) is a Mexican politician and member of the Partido Revolucionario Institucional who has served as Senator for the state of Querétaro in the Mexican Senate from 2006 to 2009 and as the Governor of Querétaro from 2009 to 2015.

He subsequently served as the Secretary of Agriculture (Secretario de Agricultura, Ganadería, Desarrollo Rural, Pesca y Alimentación in the Mexican federal government, from 2015 to 2018.

Political offices
Preceded by Francisco Garrido Patrón	Governor of Querétaro; 2009-2015	Succeeded by Jorge López Portillo Tostado
