= Mariano Palacios Alcocer =

Mexican politician

Mariano Palacios Alcocer (Note: In this Mexican name, the surname is Palacios and the second or maternal family name is Alcocer.) (born May 27, 1952) is a Mexican politician affiliated with the Institutional Revolutionary Party (PRI). He is a former governor of Querétaro and has presided twice over the PRI.

Born in Santiago de Querétaro, Mariano Palacios received a doctorate in law from the National Autonomous University of Mexico in 1995; he also holds both a bachelor's and a master's degree in law from the Autonomous University of Querétaro. He is married to Ana María González de Palacios, with whom he has seven children.

== Political career ==
Palacios began his political career at the age of 21 when he became a Querétaro state deputy in the 54th legislature (1973–1976). He has been mayor of Santiago de Querétaro (1976–1979), senator for the State of Querétaro (1982–1985), Governor of Querétaro (1985–1991), federal congressman in the 57th Legislature (1997) and President of the National Executive Committee of the Revolutionary Institutional Party from 1997 until 1999 and again in 2005.

He has also been President of the Advisory Council of the Secretariat of Social Development (SEDESOL), Federal Attorney for Environmental Protection (1993–1994), Mexican Ambassador to Portugal (1995–1997), and Secretary of Labor (1999–2000) in President Ernesto Zedillo's cabinet.

== See also ==
- List of presidents of Querétaro Municipality

== Notes ==
Preceded by Roberto Madrazo	President of the Institutional Revolutionary Party; 2005–2007	Succeeded by Beatriz Paredes Rangel
Preceded by Rafael Camacho Guzmán	Governor of Querétaro; 1985–1991	Succeeded by Enrique Burgos García
