= Guillermo Tamborrel Suárez =

Mexican politician

Senator for Querétaro
- In office 1 September 2006 – 31 August 2012
- Preceded by: Francisco Fernández de Cevallos
- Succeeded by: Francisco Domínguez Servién

Personal details
- Born: 25 April 1960 (age 65) Federal District, Mexico
- Party: PAN
- Occupation: Senator

Guillermo Enrique Marcos Tamborrel Suárez (born 25 April 1960) is a Mexican politician affiliated with the National Action Party (PAN). He served as a senator during the 60th and 61st sessions of Congress (2006–2012), representing Querétaro. He also served as a federal deputy during the 59th Congress (2003–2006), representing Querétaro's third district, and as a local deputy in the Congress of Querétaro.
