= List of municipal presidents of Querétaro =

The following is a list of municipal presidents of Querétaro Municipality, Mexico. The municipality includes Querétaro City.

== List of officials ==
- Alfonso M. Camacho, 1916-1917
- Gonzalo Vizcaíno (interim), 1917
- Ignacio Sanabria (interim), 1917
- Agustín Herrera Pérez (interim), 1917
- Alfonso Fernández de Jáuregui (interim), 1917-1919
- Francisco J. Urquiza (interim), 1919
- Manuel Anaya Jr. (interim), 1919
- Hermenegildo Muñoz, 1919
- José Villa (provisional), 1919-1920
- Vicente Enrique Guerrero (provisional), 1920
- Carlos A. Terán, 1920
- Andrés Landaverde (interim), 1920-1921
- J. Cruz Hernández (provisional), 1921
- Ramón García Vega, 1921
- Vicente Enrique Guerrero, 1921-1922
- Manuel M. Pérez (interim), 1922
- Carlos A. Terán (interim), 1922
- José Refugio del Castillo (interim), 1922
- Carlos A. Terán (interim), 1922-1923
- Ricardo Olvera, 1923-1925
- Filemón Basaldúa (interim), 1925
- Miguel A. Herrera, 1925-1926
- Antonio Vargas (interim), 1926-1927
- Trinidad Gudiño, 1927-1928
- José C. Calzada, 1928-1929
- Agustín Casas, 1929
- Andrés Landaverde, 1929-1930
- Braulio M. Guerra, 1930-1931
- Ignacio García, 1931-1932
- Luis Aguilar S., 1932-1933
- Benjamín Feregrino (interim), 1933
- Enrique Omaña (interim), 1933
- Juan J. Bermúdez, 1933-1936
- J. Jesús Veraza (interim), 1936
- José Santamaría Jr. (interim), 1936-1937
- Juan C. Peña, 1937-1938
- Corl. Juan José Pérez Tejeda (interim), 1938-1939
- Daniel Méndez, 1939
- Celestino Ramírez, 1939-1941
- Arnulfo Rubio Guerrero, 1941-1943
- Arturo Domínguez Paulín, 1943-1945
- Samuel Palacios Borja (interim), 1945-1946
- José C. Calzada, 1946-1949
- Samuel Palacios Borja, 1949-1952
- Pablo Muñoz Gutiérrez (interim), 1952
- José Luis Herrera Pimentel, 1952-1955
- Alvaro Larrondo Michaus, 1955-1958
- Alonso M. Barredo, 1958-1961
- Juventino Castro Sánchez, 1961-1964
- José Luján Sánchez (interim), 1964
- Ricardo Rangel Andrade, 1964-1967
- Alejandro Esquivel Rodríguez, 1967-1970
- Antonio Calzada Urquiza, 1970-1973
- Manuel Trejo Vega (interim), 1973
- Jorge Torres Vázquez, 1973-1976
- Mariano Palacios Alcocer, 1976-1979
- Alvaro Larrondo Ojeda, 1979-1982
- René Martínez Gutiérrez, 1982-1985
- Manuel Cevallos Urueta, 1985-1988
- Braulio Guerra Malo, 1988-1991
- Andrés Garrido del Toral (interim), 1991
- Alfonso Ballesteros Negrete, 1991-1994
- Jesús Rodríguez Hernández, 1994-1997
- Noradino Rubio Espinoza de los Monteros (interim), 1997
- Francisco Garrido Patrón, 1997-2000
- Rolando García Ortiz, 2000-2003
- Armando Rivera Castillejos, 2003-2006
- Manuel Gonzalez Valle, 2006-2009
- Francisco Domínguez Servién, 2009-2012
- Roberto Loyola Vera, 2012-2015
- Marcos Aguilar Vega, 2015-2018
- Luis Bernardo Nava Guerrero, 2018-current

== See also ==
- Querétaro state election, 2018
- History of Querétaro City
- List of presidents of Querétaro Municipality (in Spanish)
