= Javier Bolaños Aguilar =

Mexican politician

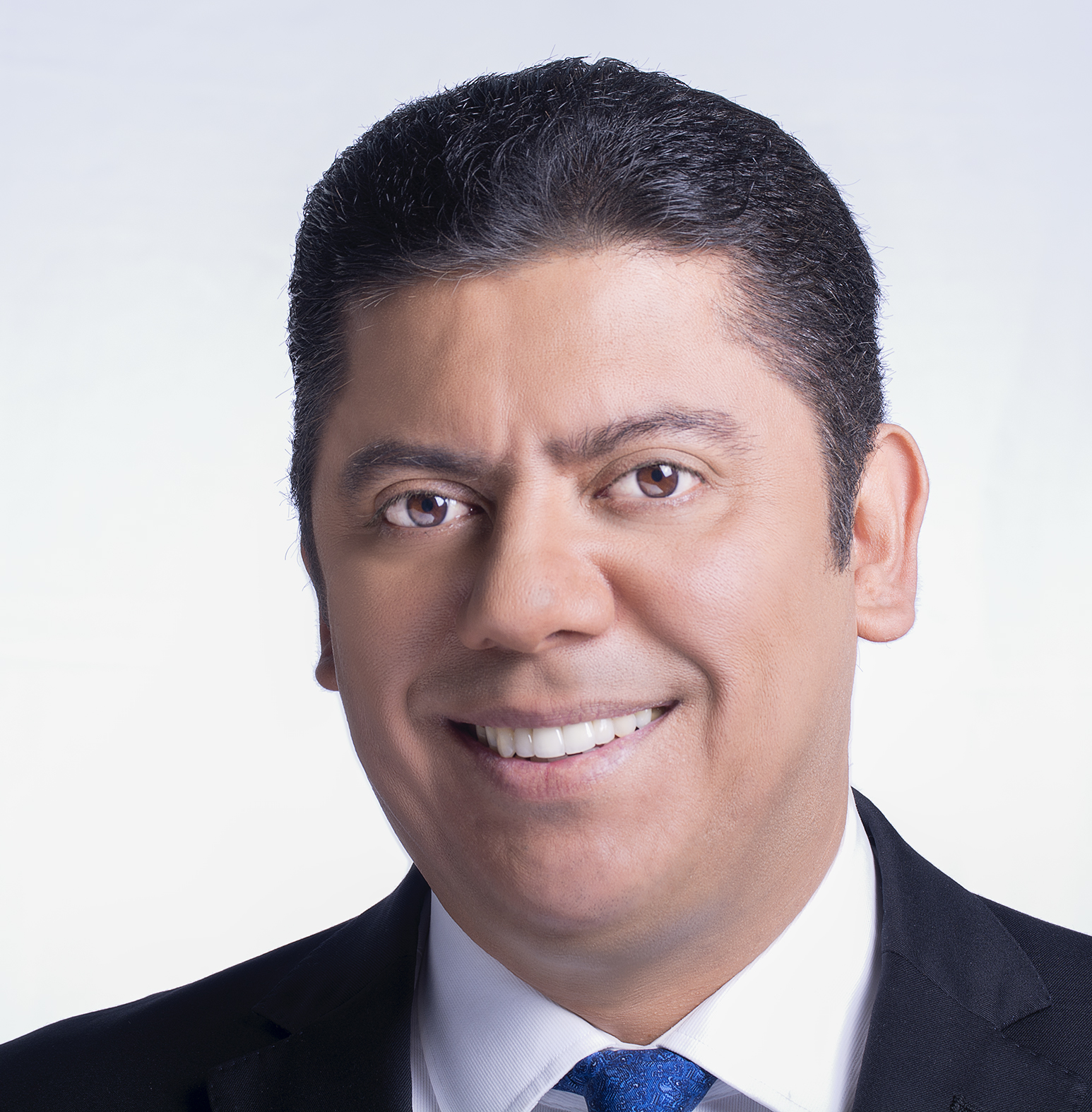

President of the Chamber of Deputies
- In office 1 September 2016 – 28 February 2017
- Preceded by: Jesús Zambrano Grijalva
- Succeeded by: Guadalupe Murguía Gutiérrez

Personal details
- Born: 20 May 1965 (age 60) Xalapa, Veracruz, Mexico
- Party: PAN (1997-2021)
- Occupation: Politician

Edmundo Javier Bolaños Aguilar (born 20 May 1965) is a Mexican politician from the National Action Party (PAN). He served as a federal deputy to the LXIII Legislature of the Mexican Congress, representing the first district of Morelos, and was additionally the President of the Chamber of Deputies for part of the second year of the legislature, in 2016 and 2017.

== Life ==
Bolaños obtained a degree in petroleum engineering from the Instituto Politécnico Nacional in 1987 and went to work for private companies such as SACOC, S.A., and EPSCOM, S.C., as well as on municipal water and drilling systems. His first job in this capacity was in Valle de Chalco, State of Mexico, where he was the general coordinator of hydraulic projects from 1990 to 1991. Bolaños then went on to work on projects related to sources of drinking water in Puebla City and León, Guanajuato, and in 1995 he was tapped to become an operations manager for the Decentralized Public Agency for the Provision of Water, Sewer and Sanitation Systems (ODAPAS).

In 1997, Bolaños became the director general of the Drinking Water and Sewer System of Cuernavaca, his first government post of several in Morelos. Three years later, he became the executive secretary of the Morelos State Water and Environment Commission.

In 2006, after a time on the state party executive committee, the National Action Party placed Bolaños on its proportional representation list and sent him to the Chamber of Deputies for the LX Legislature of the Mexican Congress. He sat on commissions including Metropolitan Development, Environment and Natural Resources, Special on Harassment of Journalists and Media, Special on Water Rights and Protection of Aquatic Environments, and Investigative on Social and Ecological Damage Generated by PEMEX. After his stint as a deputy, he returned to the Morelos state government, this time as subsecretary of government, before being elected as a local deputy to the LII Legislature of the Congress of Morelos, where he presided over the Water and Natural Resources Commission.

In 2015, Bolaños ran for and won a seat in the federal Chamber of Deputies, this time from the first of Morelos's five districts, based in Cuernavaca. He was named President of the Chamber of Deputies for the second year of the legislature, which runs between September 1, 2016 and August 31, 2017. However, Bolaños will only serve the first six months to allow María Guadalupe Murguía Gutiérrez, also from the PAN, to occupy the post.
