= Juan Manuel Fernández de Jaúregui =

Mexican politician

Juan Manuel Fernández de Jáuregui

Juan Manuel Fernández de Jáuregui (September 14, 1814, Querétaro, Viceroyalty of New Spain – January 4, 1871, Mexico City, Mexico) was the acting Governor of Querétaro from December 1, 1849 to March 6, 1850.

== Bibliography ==
- Los gobernantes de Querétaro. El santanismo (1833-1857) .Juan Manuel Fernández de Jáuregui, J.R. Fortson y Cia, México, 1987
