= Francisco Domínguez Servién =

Mexican politician

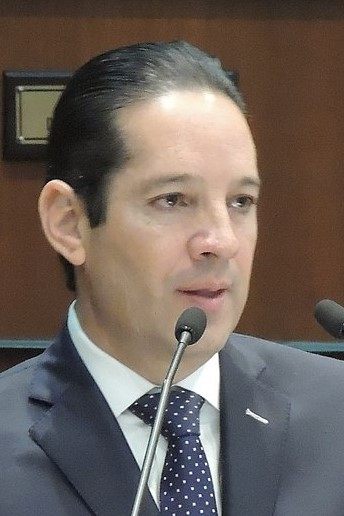

27th Governor of Querétaro
- In office 1 October 2015 – 30 September 2021
- Preceded by: Jorge López Portillo Tostado (interim)
- Succeeded by: Mauricio Kuri González

Senator for Querétaro
- In office 1 September 2012 – 26 February 2015
- Preceded by: Guillermo Tamborrel Suárez
- Succeeded by: Sonia Rocha Acosta

Member of the Chamber of Deputies for Querétaro's 2nd district
- In office 1 September 2006 – 23 February 2009
- Preceded by: Rogelio Chavarría Salas
- Succeeded by: Bibiana Rodríguez Montes

Personal details
- Born: 11 August 1966 (age 60) Querétaro, Mexico
- Party: National Action Party (PAN)
- Education: Autonomous University of Queretaro (BS)
- Profession: Politician

Francisco Domínguez Servién (born 11 August 1966) is a Mexican politician affiliated with the National Action Party (PAN). He served as Governor of Querétaro from 2016 to 2021. Previously, he also served as a senator of the LXII Legislature of the Mexican Congress (2012–2015) representing Querétaro, and as a deputy during the LX Legislature (2006–2008), representing Querétaro's second district.

In March 2020 he tested positive for COVID-19, from which he later recovered.

Governor Domínguez Servién was accused by Emilio Lozoya Austin, former director of Pemex, in July 2020 of receiving bribes in 2013-2014 to support energy reform legislation. Domínguez Servién fired his secretary, Guillermo Gutiérrez Badillo, in August after the latter and a senator appeared on a video receiving money from a director of Pemex. The governor denied having previous knowledge of the incident.

== See also ==
- List of presidents of Querétaro Municipality
