= Marcela Torres Peimbert =

Mexican politician

María Marcela Torres Peimbert
- Born: 7 October 1961 (age 64); Federal District, Mexico
- Occupation: Senator
- Political party: PAN

María Marcela Torres Peimbert (born 7 October 1961) is a Mexican politician affiliated with the PAN. She currently serves as Senator of the LXII Legislature of the Mexican Congress representing Querétaro. She also served as Deputy during the LXI Legislature.
