= CONCANACO =

- Confederación de Cámaras Nacionales de Comercio, Servicios y Turismo
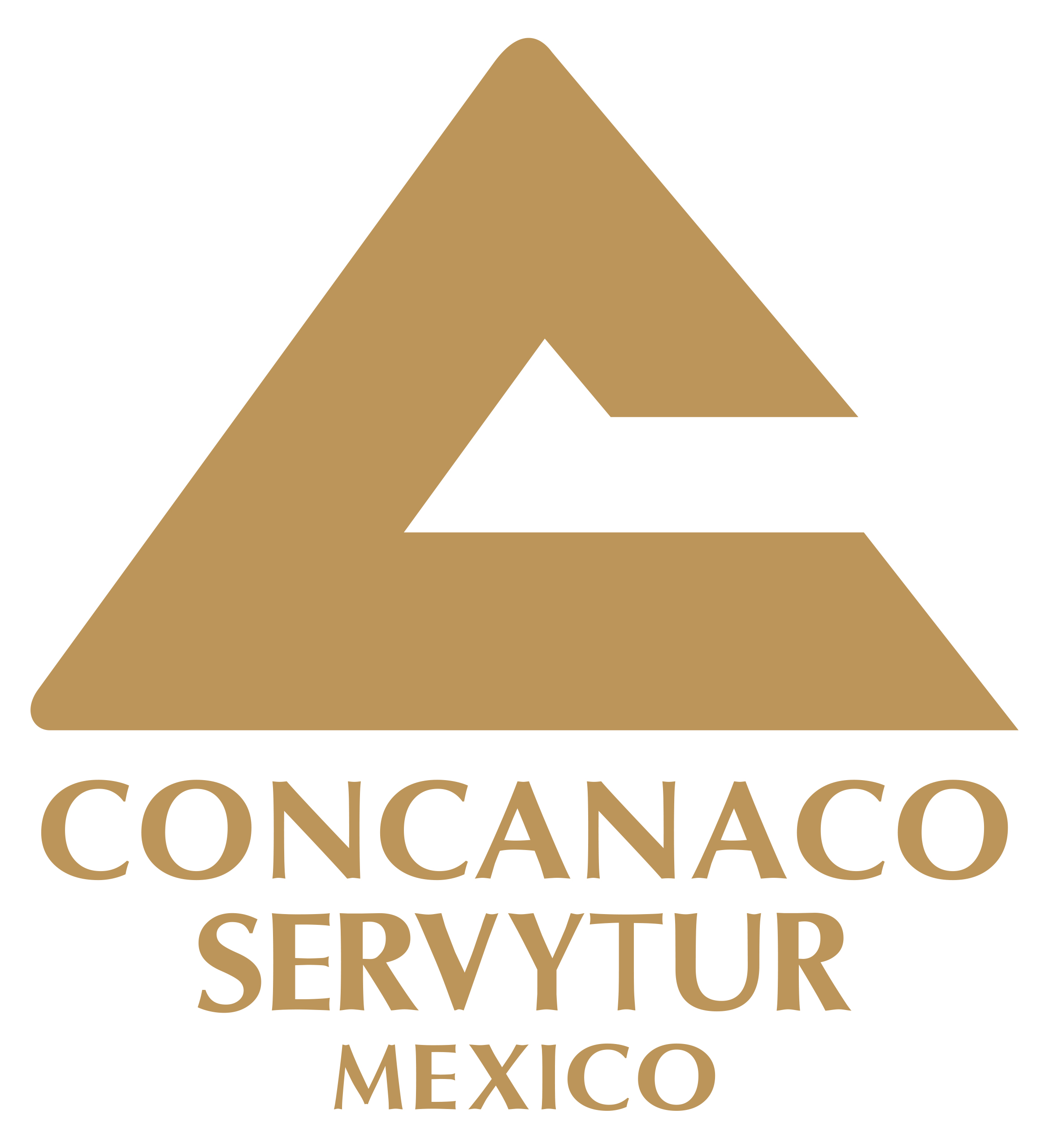
- President: José Manuel López Campos
- Website: concanaco.com.mx

CONCANACO (Spanish: Confederación de Cámaras Nacionales de Comercios; Confederation of the National Chambers of Commerce) is a Mexican public institution that coordinates and represents the local chambers of commerce, known as CANACO, before the federal government. ts main tasks are to encourage the private sector to invest in new business opportunities in the country and to promote Mexico's tourism industry. CONCANACO's current president is José Manuel López Campos, appointed on 28 March 2014.
