= Ignacio Loyola Vera =

Mexican politician

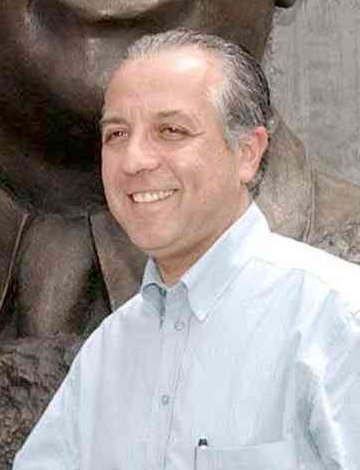
Ignacio Loyola Vera

Ignacio Loyola Vera (born 10 September 1954) is a Mexican politician. A member of the National Action Party (PAN), he served as Governor of Querétaro from 1 October 1997 to 30 September 2003.

== Career ==
Born in Santiago de Querétaro, Loyola obtained a B.Sc. in Agricultural Engineering and Zootechnology at the ITESM. Before politics he was the director of his own agricultural business, an advisor to COPARMEX (1992–1994), vice-president of the Society of Agricultural Engineers and Parasitologists (1993–1995), advisor to CANACO (1994–1996) and director of COPARMEX in Querétaro (1996).

With no previous political experience, he ran for the governorship of Querétaro in 1997. In a surprising victory he defeated Fernando Ortiz Arana of the Institutional Revolutionary Party (PRI). He approved the construction of the new international airport, which began in 2002 and was inaugurated in 2004 by his successor. During his term, he accomplished the construction of the International Airport of Querétaro, The Ecocentro Expositor, The Cultural Center Gómez Morín, and the Hospital del Niño y la Mujer, among others. Querétaro also improved in different veins such as tourism, employment, security, Economic Development and less corruption.

In 2001, when the political group denominated "zapatistas" organized a march through several sections of the country until they reached the Mexican capital, Loyola confronted subcommander Marcos, making notice of whether or not the EZLN was worthy of being called an army.

- Advisor to the SCT, prepared studies for the high-speed train project from Mexico City to Guadalajara
- He served as Federal Attorney of Environmental Protection under President Felipe Calderón from December 2006 to January 2008.
- Elected to the Chamber of Deputies for Querétaro's third district in 2021.
