= Juventino Castro Sánchez =

Mexican politician

José Juventino Leonardo Castro Sanchez (25 January 1919 – 3 February 2006) was a Mexican transportation and political entrepreneur. He was the Governor of Querétaro from 1967 to 1973.

== Biography ==
Castro Sanchez was born in Amealco, Querétaro on 25 January 1919. He initially studied at the School of Mechanical and Electrical Engineering of the Instituto Politécnico Nacional in Mexico City, but was unable to finish his degree because of funding. He returned to Querétaro and studied trade, graduating in 1939.

He was elected to the State Congress of Querétaro in 1943. In 1946 he was appointed director of State Transit, at a time when contact with freight carriers from the Midwest emerged. After leaving the position, he worked in the transportation sector from 1949 to 1960. In 1961 he was elected municipal president of Querétaro and in 1967 he was elected as the Governor of Querétaro. During his governorship, he oversaw the construction of several dams, wells and roads as well as the University Center of the Autonomous University of Queretaro, facilities of the Queretaro Institute of Technology, and the Exhibition Center.

Castro Sanchez retired from politics at the end of his term as governor in 1973. He died of respiratory arrest on 3 February 2006, at his home in Querétaro. His remains were cremated.

== See also ==
- List of presidents of Querétaro Municipality
