= José B. Alcocer =

José Baraquiel Alcocer was a lawyer, president of the Superior Court of Justice and twice governor of the State of Querétaro, the first time for 3 hours and the second time for 24 hours.

On June 25, 1929, Governor Abraham Araujo was removed from office by the state legislature and Alcocer was appointed interim governor because he was president of the state Superior Court of Justice. He held the position for only three hours, handing it over to Ángel Vázquez Mellado.

On June 5, 1930, Governor Vázquez Mellado returned the government toAlcocer, since he was also disqualified by the State Congress. The following day, Alcocer handed over the government to Ramón Anaya, appointed interim governor.

Although Alcocer was governor for only three hours, this makes him the shortest governor, but not the person with the least time in power as he was governor for the second time for 24 hours more. Fernando Ávalos holds the record as the person who has been governor of Querétaro for the shortest time, only five hours.

== Bibliography ==
- Robert., Fortson Blanco, James (1987). Los Gobernantes de Querétaro : historia (1823-1987). J.R. Fortson y Cía. OCLC 24545569.
- Andres., Garrido del Toral (1998). Episodios queretanos. [s.n.] OCLC 912589084.
- Andrés., Garrido del Toral (2007). El Querétaro que se nos fue. Gobierno del Estado de Querétaro. OCLC 757180707.
- Andres., Garrido del Toral (1998). Episodios queretanos. [s.n.] OCLC 912589084.
