= Alfredo Lugo Oñate =

Mexican politician

- Born: 11 November 1958 (age 67); Querétaro, Mexico
- Occupation: Politician
- Political party: PRI

Alfredo Francisco Lugo Oñate (born 11 November 1958) is a Mexican politician from the Institutional Revolutionary Party. From 2009 to 2012 he served as Deputy of the LXI Legislature of the Mexican Congress representing Querétaro.
