= Jesús Rodríguez Hernández =

Mexican politician (born 1955)

- Born: 7 July 1955 (age 70); Querétaro, Mexico
- Occupation: Politician
- Political party: PRI

Jesús María Rodríguez Hernández (born 7 July 1955) is a Mexican politician from the Institutional Revolutionary Party. From 2009 to 2012 he served as Deputy of the LXI Legislature of the Mexican Congress representing Querétaro.

== See also ==
- List of presidents of Querétaro Municipality
