= Mauricio Kuri =

Mexican politician

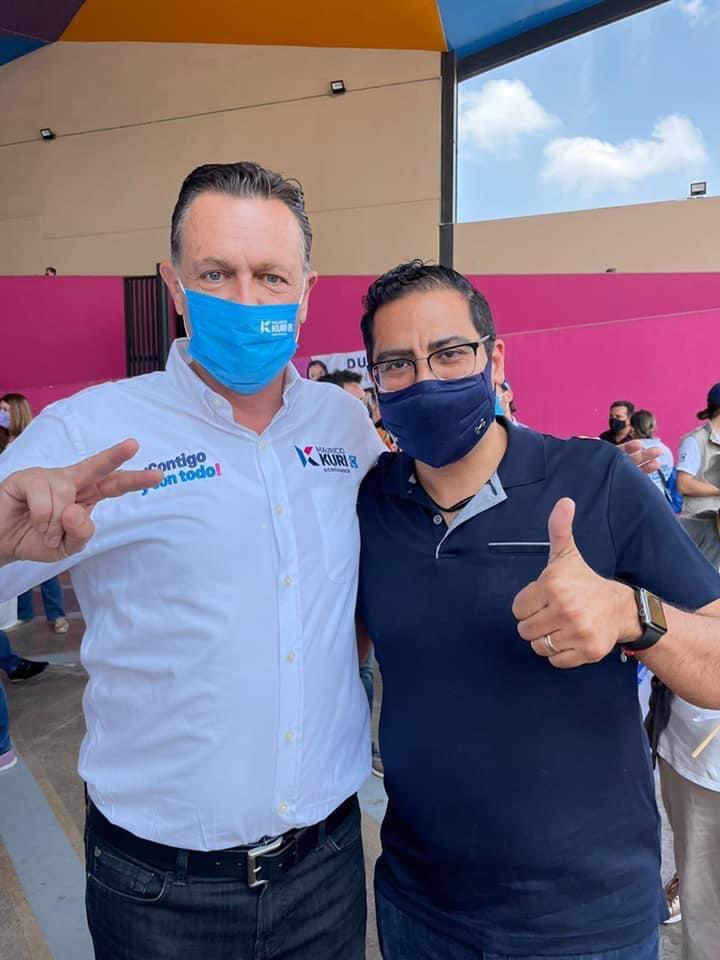
- Kuri (left) in 2022

Governor of Querétaro
- Incumbent
- Assumed office 1 October 2021
- Preceded by: Francisco Domínguez Servién

Personal details
- Born: Mauricio Kuri González; 9 May 1969 (age 57) Orizaba, Veracruz
- Party: National Action Party
- Spouse: Carmen María Herrera Soto
- Occupation: Businessman

Mauricio Kuri González (born 9 May 1969) is a Mexican politician affiliated with the National Action Party and current Governor of Querétaro. He previously served as mayor of Corregidora Municipality and as senator for Querétaro.
