= CANACO =

Local chambers of commerce in Mexico

The Nacional Chambers of Commerce, Services and Tourism (Spanish: Cámaras Nacionales de Comercio, Servicios y Turismo, abb. CANACO) are local chambers of commerce in Mexico. They are represented at the national level by CONCANACO (National Confederation of the Chambers of Commerce).
