= 2006 in Mexico =

- Decades: 1980s; 1990s; 2000s; 2010s; 2020s
- See also: History of Mexico; List of years in Mexico; Timeline of Mexican history

This is a list of events that happened in 2006 in Mexico.

== Incumbents ==
=== Federal government ===
==== President ====
- President
  - Vicente Fox PAN, until November 30
  - Felipe Calderón PAN, starting December 1

==== Cabinet ====
- Interior Secretary (SEGOB)
  - Santiago Creel, until November 30
  - Francisco Javier Ramírez Acuña, starting December 1
- Secretary of Foreign Affairs (SRE)
  - Luis Ernesto Derbez, until November 30
  - Patricia Espinosa, starting December 1
- Communications Secretary (SCT)
  - Pedro Cerisola, until November 30
  - Luis Téllez, starting December 1
- Education Secretary (SEP)
  - Reyes Tamez, until November 30
  - Josefina Vázquez Mota, starting December 1
- Secretary of Defense (SEDENA)
  - Gerardo Clemente Vega, until November 30
  - Guillermo Galván Galván, starting December 1
- Secretary of Navy (SEMAR)
  - Marco Antonio Peyrot González, until November 30
  - Mariano Francisco Saynez Mendoza, starting December 1
- Secretary of Labor and Social Welfare (STPS)
  - Francisco Javier Salazar Sáenz, until November 30
  - Javier Lozano Alarcón, starting December 1
- Secretary of Welfare (SEDESOL)
  - Josefina Vázquez Mota, until November 30
  - Beatriz Zavala, starting December 1
- Tourism Secretary (SECTUR): Rodolfo Elizondo Torres
- Secretary of the Environment (SEMARNAT)
  - José Luis Luege Tamargo, until November 30
  - Juan Rafael Elvira Quesada, starting December 1
- Secretary of Health (SALUD)
  - Julio Frenk, until November 30
  - José Ángel Córdova, starting December 1
- Secretary of Public Security (SSP)
  - Eduardo Medina-Mora Icaza, until November 30
  - Genaro García Luna, starting December 1
- Secretary of Finance and Public Credit (SHCP)
  - Francisco Gil Díaz, until November 30
  - Agustín Carstens, starting December 1
- Secretariat of Energy (Mexico) (SENER): Georgina Yamilet Kessel Martínez, starting December 1
- Secretary of Agriculture (SAGARPA): Alberto Cárdenas, starting December 1
- Secretary of Public Function (FUNCIÓN PÚBLICA): German Martínez Cázares, starting December 1
- Secretary of Agrarian Reform (SRA): Germán Martínez, starting December 1
- Attorney General of Mexico (PRG)
  - Daniel Cabeza de Vaca, until November 30
  - Eduardo Medina-Mora Icaza, starting December 1

=== Supreme Court ===
- President of the Supreme Court: Mariano Azuela Güitrón

=== Governors ===
- Aguascalientes: Luis Armando Reynoso PAN
- Baja California: Eugenio Elorduy Walther PAN
- Baja California Sur: Narciso Agúndez Montaño PRD
- Campeche: Jorge Carlos Hurtado Valdez PAN
- Chiapas
  - Pablo Salazar Mendiguchía PRD, until December 7
  - Juan Sabines Guerrero (Coalition for the Good of All), starting December 8
- Chihuahua: José Reyes Baeza Terrazas PRI
- Coahuila: Humberto Moreira PRI
- Colima: Gustavo Vázquez Montes PRI
- Durango: Ismael Hernández PRI
- Guanajuato
  - Juan Carlos Romero Hicks PAN, until September 25
  - Juan Manuel Oliva PAN, starting September 26
- Guerrero: Zeferino Torreblanca PRD
- Hidalgo: Miguel Ángel Osorio Chong PRI
- Jalisco
  - Alberto Cárdenas PAN, until November 20
  - Gerardo Solís Gómez PAN, substitute governor
- State of Mexico: Enrique Peña Nieto PRI
- Michoacán: Lázaro Cárdenas Batel PRD
- Morelos
  - Sergio Estrada Cajigal Ramírez PAN, until October 1.
  - Marco Antonio Adame PAN, starting October 1.
- Nayarit: Ney González Sánchez
- Nuevo León: Fernando Canales Clariond PAN
- Oaxaca: Ulises Ruiz Ortiz PRI
- Puebla: Mario Plutarco Marín Torres PRI
- Querétaro: Francisco Garrido Patrón PAN
- Quintana Roo: Félix González Canto PRI
- San Luis Potosí: Jesús Marcelo de los Santos PAN
- Sinaloa: Juan S. Millán PRI, until December 31
- Sonora: Eduardo Bours PRI
- Tabasco: Manuel Andrade Díaz PAN, until December 31
- Tamaulipas: Eugenio Hernández Flores PRI
- Tlaxcala: Alfonso Sánchez Anaya PRD
- Veracruz: Fidel Herrera Beltrán PRI
- Yucatán: Víctor Cervera Pacheco PRI
- Zacatecas: Amalia García PRD
- Head of Government of the Federal District
  - Alejandro Encinas Rodríguez PRD, until December 4
  - Marcelo Ebrard PRD, starting December 5

== Events ==
- The Broad Progressive Front is founded
- The Garros Galería is established.
- The Televisa Law is approved.
- The Sierra de Huautla Biosphere Reserve is declared by the UNESCO in Morelos.
- The Biosphere Reserve of Huatulco is declared by the UNESCO in Oaxaca.
- January: The Other Campaign
- January 23: Raúl Osiel Marroquín is apprehended.
- January 25: Juana Barraza is apprehended.
- February 4: Sheraton Maria Isabel Hotel and Towers incident.
- February 19: Pasta de Conchos mine disaster
- March 2: Cumbres case
- March: Santiago Mexquititlán raid
- April 10: 2006 Mexico DC-9 drug bust
- May: Jojutla crater discovered on Mars by astronomer Andres Eloy Martínez Rojas.
- May 3: 2006 civil unrest in San Salvador Atenco
- May 27: Eutelsat 113 West A is launched.
- June 17: Popular Assembly of the Peoples of Oaxaca
- June 27: Ángel Albino Corzo International Airport inaugurated.
- June 28: Miss Latin America 2006 held in Riviera Maya.
- September 2: Nuestra Belleza México 2006
- September 16: the Faro del Comercio is re-inaugurated.
- November 10: The government of Mexico City approves a law on civil unions, becoming the first local government to allow same sex unions in Mexico.
- December 11: Beginning of the Mexican drug war
- unknown date: Galia Moss, a Latin American sailor crosses the Atlantic Ocean alone.

== Elections ==
- 2006 Mexican general election
- 2006 Chiapas state election
- 2006 Colima state election
- 2006 Mexican Federal District election
- 2006 Guanajuato state election
- 2006 Jalisco state election
- 2006 Nuevo León state election
- 2006 Sonora state election
- 2006 State of Mexico election
- 2006 Tabasco state election

== Awards ==
- Belisario Domínguez Medal of Honor - Jesús Kumate Rodríguez
- Order of the Aztec Eagle
- National Prize for Arts and Sciences
- National Public Administration Prize
- Ohtli Award
  - Pete Gallego
  - Buddy Garcia
  - Ignacio E. Lozano, Jr.
  - Ed Pastor
  - Jared Polis
  - Santiago Wood

== Popular culture ==
=== Sports ===
- Primera División de México Clausura 2006
- Primera División de México Apertura 2006
- 2006 InterLiga
- 2005 Copa Sudamericana Finals
- Mexico compete at the 2006 FIFA World Cup in Germany.
- Vuelta Chihuahua Internacional
- 2006 Desafío Corona season
- 2006 Gran Premio Telmex
- 2006 Rally México
- 2006 Mexican Figure Skating Championships
- Homenaje a Dos Leyendas (2006)
- 2006 Centrobasket Women in Mexico City.
- 2006 Men's Pan-American Volleyball Cup in Baja California.
- Mexico at the 2006 Winter Paralympics

=== Film ===
- Una película de huevos
- Efectos secundarios – September 1
- Pretendiendo
- Pan's Labyrinth – October 2
- Así del precipicio
- Cansada de besar sapos – December

=== TV ===
==== Telenovelas ====
- Heridas de amor
- La fea más bella
- Código postal – May 22

== Notable deaths ==
- January 1 – Mapita Cortés, 75, Puerto Rican -born actress of the cinema of Mexico
- January 13 – Raúl Anguiano, 90, painter and muralist, heart failure.
- February 10 – Juan Soriano, 85, painter and sculptor.
- February 12 – Juan Sánchez-Navarro y Peón, 92, entrepreneur and co-founder of the PAN.
- March 7 – Ludwik Margules, 72, theatre director, cancer.
- March 29 – Salvador Elizondo, 73, writer.
- April 5 – Armando Labra, 62, economist.
- April 20 – Miguel Zacarías Nogaim, 101, film director.
- April 30 – Beatriz Sheridan, 71, actress and director, heart attack.
- May 4 – Valentin Trujillo, 55, actor, heart attack.
- May 22 – Lilia Prado, 78, actress, multiple organ failure.
- May 23 – Ángel Fernández, 80, sports broadcaster, renal failure.
- July 15 – Raúl Delgado Benavides, politician, Municipal president (Cuautitlán, Jalisco); murdered
- August 4 – Julio Galán, 47, painter
- September 15 – Pablo Santos, 19, actor
- October 9 – Mario Moya Palencia, 73, politician, heart attack.
- October 24 – Rafael Ramírez Heredia, 67, writer, lung cancer.
- November 1 – Daniel García "Huracán Ramírez", 80, wrestler, heart attack.
- November 6 – Miguel Aceves Mejía, 90, singer, bronchitis.
- November 19 – Francisco Quirós Hermosillo, General. Cancer.
- November 23 – Jesús Blancornelas, 70, journalist, cancer.

== See also ==
- 2006 Oaxaca protests
