= Timeline of Campeche City =

Coordinates: 19.85°N 90.530556°W

The following is a timeline of the history of the city of Campeche, Mexico.

== Prior to 20th century ==
- 1540 - San Francisco de Campeche founded by Spaniard Francisco de Montejo.
- 1633 - Sack of Campeche (1633) by Dutch privateers.
- 1659 - Town "sacked by the British."
- 1663 - Sack of Campeche (1663) by pirates.
- 1685 - Campeche raided by Dutch pirate Laurens de Graaf.
- 1732 - Puerta de la Tierra (gate) erected.
- 1760 - Catedral de Campeche built.
- 1762 - San José el Alto fort built.
- 1777 - Campeche attains city status; Campeche coat of arms established.
- 1796 - Hospital de San Lazaro founded.
- 1801 - Fuerte de San Miguel (Campeche) (fort) built.
- 1821 - 5 November: Campeche secedes from Yucatán.
- 1840 - June: Yucatecan occupation begins.
- 1857 - 6–7 August: Coup in Campeche.
- 1858 - State of Campeche established.
- 1864 - 26 January: French in power.
- 1871 - Telegraph begins operating.
- 1879 - Population: 15,190.
- 1883 - "Naval base established at Lerma."
- 1895 - Catholic Diocese of Campeche established.

== 20th century ==
- 1900 - Population: 17,109.
- 1903 - Bank of Campeche established.
- 1914 - Joaquín Mucel Acereto becomes Governor of Campeche state.
- 1950 - Population: 31,279.
- 1958 - Estadio Venustiano Carranza (stadium) built.
- 1970 - Population: 69,506.
- 1973 - Novedades de Campeche newspaper begins publication.
- 1975 - Tribuna de Campeche newspaper begins publication.
- 1980 - Piratas de Campeche baseball team formed.
- 1981 - Corsarios de Campeche football club formed.
- 1989 - Autonomous University of Campeche established.
- 1990 - Population: 150,518.
- 1994 - El Sur de Campeche newspaper begins publication.
- 1999 - Fortified Town of Campeche designated an UNESCO World Heritage Site.

== 21st century ==
- 2001 - Estadio Nelson Barrera (stadium) opens.
- 2005 - Population: 238,850 municipality.
- 2007 - TV MAR Campeche begins broadcasting.
- 2009 - Carlos Ernesto Rosado Ruelas elected mayor.
- 2010 - Population: 220,389 city of San Francisco de Campeche; 259,005 municipality.
- 2011 - Cañoneros de Campeche football club formed.

== See also ==
- History of San Francisco de Campeche
- Campeche history (state)
- History of Campeche (state)
- List of presidents of Campeche Municipality

== Bibliography ==
=== In English ===
- Charles Knight, ed. (1866). "Campeachy". Geography. English Cyclopaedia. Vol. 2. London: Bradbury, Evans, & Co. hdl:2027/nyp.33433000064794.
- Henry Moore (1894), "Commercial Directory: Campeche", Railway Guide of the Republic of Mexico, Springfield, Ohio: Huben & Moore, OCLC 22498265
- "Campeche". Catholic Encyclopedia. New York. 1908.
- Reau Campbell (1909), "Campeche", Campbell's New Revised Complete Guide and Descriptive Book of Mexico, Chicago: Rogers & Smith Co., OCLC 1667015
- "Campeche (city)" . Encyclopædia Britannica. Vol. 5 (11th ed.). 1910. p. 134.
- Ernst B. Filsinger (1922), "Mexico: Campeche", Commercial Travelers' Guide to Latin America, Washington, DC: Government Printing Office
- Jean Bassford von Winning (1950). "Forgotten Bastions along the Spanish Main: Campeche". The Americas. 6 (4): 415–430. doi:10.2307/978245. JSTOR 978245.
- Baedeker's Mexico, Baedekers Guides, 1994, p. 155, OL 11077410M (fulltext via OpenLibrary)
- "Yucatan Peninsula: Campeche", Mexico, Let's Go, Let's Go Publications, 1999, OL 10387112M (fulltext via OpenLibrary)
- John Fisher (1999), "Yucatan: Campeche", Mexico, Rough Guides (4th ed.), London, p. 513+, OL 24935876M
- Ben Greensfelder (2003), "Campeche", Yucatán (2nd ed.), Lonely Planet, OL 24928189M
- David Marley (2005), "Campeche", Historic Cities of the Americas, vol. 1, Santa Barbara, California: ABC-CLIO, p. 218+, ISBN 1576070271

=== In Spanish ===
- Antonio García Cubas [in Spanish] (1896). "Campeche". Diccionario Geográfico, Histórico y Biográfico de los Estados Unidos Mexicanos (in Spanish). Vol. 2. México: Antigua Imprenta de las Escalerillas. hdl:2027/coo.31924056282332 – via HathiTrust.
