= Alito Moreno =

Mexican politician

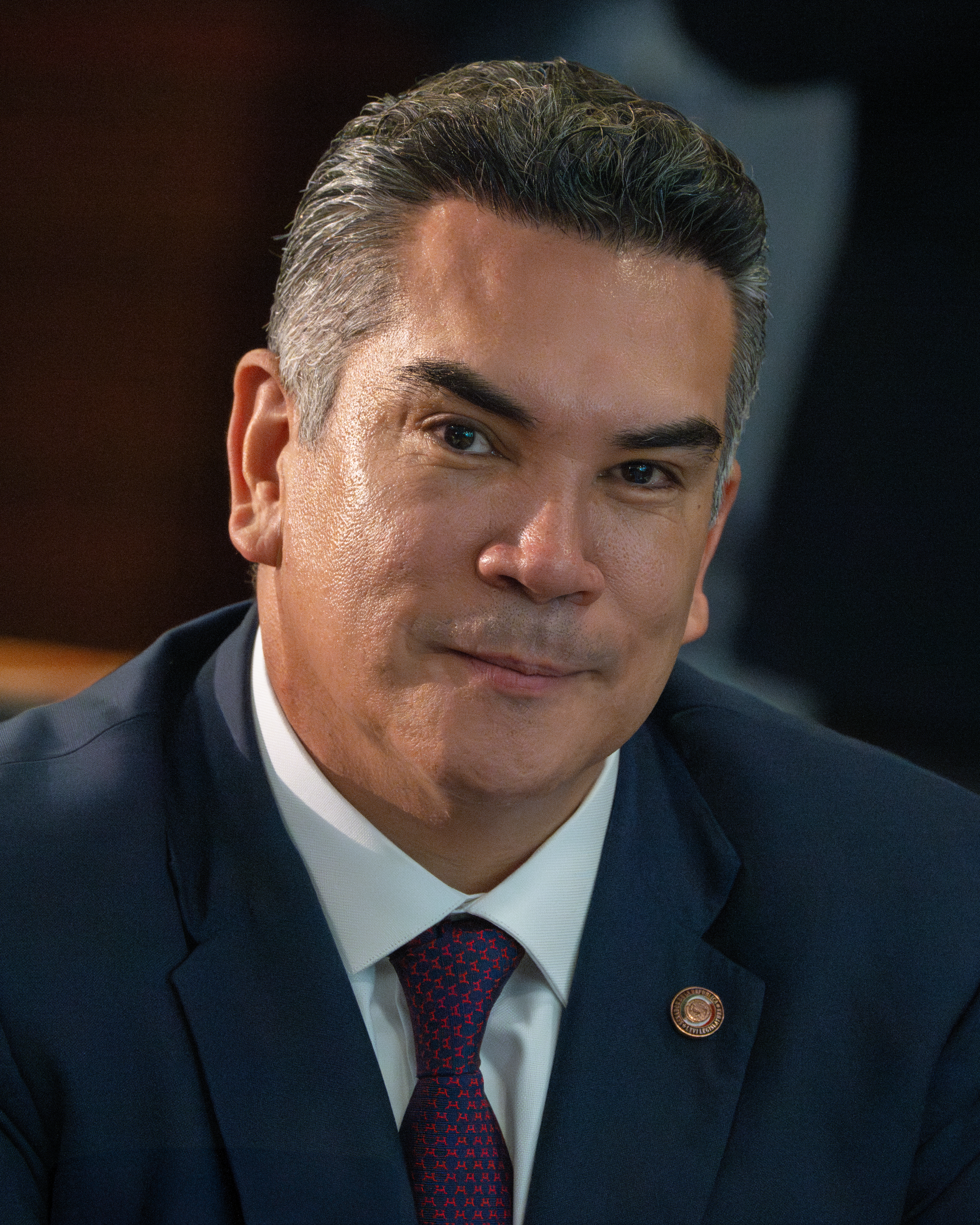
- Moreno Cárdenas in 2024

55th & 57th President of the Institutional Revolutionary Party
- Incumbent
- Assumed office 11 August 2024
- Preceded by: Graciela Ortiz González
- In office 18 August 2019 – 19 July 2024
- Preceded by: Claudia Ruiz Massieu
- Succeeded by: Graciela Ortiz González

Senator of the Republic Proportional representation
- Incumbent
- Assumed office 1 September 2024

Member of the Chamber of Deputies Proportional representation
- In office 1 September 2021 – 31 August 2024
- In office 1 September 2012 – 5 February 2015
- In office 1 September 2003 – 31 August 2006

50th Governor of Campeche
- In office 16 September 2015 – 13 June 2019
- Preceded by: Fernando Ortega Bernés
- Succeeded by: Carlos Miguel Aysa González

Senator of the Republic from Campeche Second formula
- In office 1 September 2006 – 31 December 2011
- Preceded by: Aracely Escalante Jasso
- Succeeded by: Óscar Román Rosas González

Personal details
- Born: Rafael Alejandro Moreno Cárdenas; 25 April 1975 (age 51) Campeche, Campeche, Mexico
- Party: Institutional Revolutionary Party (since 1991)
- Spouse: Christelle Castañón Sandoval (m. 2012)
- Relatives: Christian Castro Bello (nephew)
- Education: ITES René Descartes
- Profession: Lawyer

Rafael Alejandro Moreno Cárdenas (Note: In this Mexican name, the surname is Moreno and the second or maternal family name is Cárdenas.) (born 25 April 1975), often known by the hypocorism Alito, is a Mexican politician who has been the President of the Institutional Revolutionary Party (PRI) since 2019. He served as governor of Campeche from 2015 to 2019 and was elected to the Senate from the PRI's national list in 2024.

== Early life and education ==
Moreno Cárdenas was born on 25 April 1975, in San Francisco de Campeche, Campeche. He received a Bachelor of Laws degree from the René Descartes Institute of Superior Technological Studies (ITES René Descartes). He also has a diploma on electoral law from the Autonomous University of Campeche (UACAM).

== Political career ==
He has been an active member of the Institutional Revolutionary Party (PRI) since 1991. In 2002, he was elected as síndico of judicial affairs in the municipality of Campeche. He served as a regional list deputy in both the 59th and 62nd sessions of Congress. Moreno Cárdenas served as a senator, representing the state of Campeche, during the 60th and 61st congressional sessions (2006–2012).

Moreno Cárdenas was governor of Campeche from September 2015 to July 2019. He resigned to run for president of the Institutional Revolutionary Party (PRI).

=== Party leadership ===
He served in the following positions within the PRI in Campeche: as state counselor, as a municipal councilor, as president of the Municipal Directive Committee (CDM) of the Popular Revolutionary Youth of the National Confederation of Popular Organizations (CNOP), and as president of the State Directive Committee of the Popular Revolutionary Youth of the CNOP.

On the national level, he served as organization secretary of the National Executive Committee (CEN) of the Revolutionary Youth Front and national coordinator of the Revolutionary Youth Front of PRI.

In 2019, he was unanimously elected as president of the Permanent Conference of Political Parties of Latin America and the Caribbean (COPPPAL) for the 2019 to 2023 period. He was reelected for the 2022–2026 period in mid-2022.

== Business career ==
During his term as governor of Campeche (2015–2019), he acquired several local newspapers, including El Sur, Novedades, El Expreso de Campeche, and the digital news-site webcampeche.com. Local newspapers and magazines of Campeche and Veracruz have also alleged that he bought the Mayavisión TV channel using his brother, Gabriel Emigdio Moreno Cárdenas, as an intermediary.

== Controversies ==
Amid criticism about mishandling funds during his campaign, on 13 July 2019, Moreno Cárdenas requested to be relieved of his duties as governor so that he could run for president of the PRI and then was elected. The Congress of Campeche named Carlos Miguel Aysa González in his place.

His tenure as president of his party has been surrounded by controversy, especially due to the audioscandals released by the current governor of Campeche, Layda Sansores. Although he sought legal protection against the release of more audios, because they were allegedly acquired illegally, courts in several states have rejected his petitions.

In 2022, both critics from within his party and experts have claimed the hits to his reputation threaten the viability of the Va por México coalition (which includes the National Action Party (PAN) and the Party of the Democratic Revolution (PRD), in addition to the PRI), and have called for him to resign. Alito rejected those calls, justifying his decision on the fact that his term as president of the party ends in 2023. Despite a controversy taken before the Electoral Tribunal, Moreno was re-elected as president of the PRI for a further four-year term in August 2024.

On 27 August 2025, Moreno brawled with Senate president Gerardo Fernández Noroña (Morena) inside the chamber after Moreno accused the latter of not allowing him to speak following that day's session.

== Personal life ==
He is married to Christelle Castañón, with whom he has two children.

== Notes ==
Political offices
Preceded by Fernando Ortega Bernés	Governor of Campeche; 2015–2019	Succeeded by Carlos Miguel Aysa González
