= 2006 Mexican elections =

A number of elections on the federal and local level took place in Mexico during 2006.

== Federal election ==
A general election was held on Sunday, July 2, 2006. Voters went to the polls to elect, on the federal level:

- A new President of the Republic
- A new Congress (both chambers)

The Federal Electoral Institute (IFE) is the public organization responsible for organizing the general election in Mexico.

== Local elections ==
In addition to the general election in July 2006, 12 states and the Federal District (Mexico City) held local elections during the course of the year.

Date	State	Voters elected	Main article
March 12, 2006	State of México	State congress, 125 municipal presidents (mayors)	2006 México state election
July 2, 2006	Federal District	Head of Government, Legislative Assembly, 16 borough mayors	2006 Mexican Federal District election
July 2, 2006	Sonora	State congress, 72 municipal presidents (mayors)	2006 Sonora state election
July 2, 2006	Nuevo León	State congress, 51 municipal presidents (mayors)	2006 Nuevo León state election
July 2, 2006	Jalisco	Governor, state congress, 124 municipal presidents (mayors)	2006 Jalisco state election
July 2, 2006	Colima	State congress, 10 municipal presidents (mayors)	2006 Colima state election
July 2, 2006	Guanajuato	Governor, state congress, 46 municipal presidents (mayors)	2006 Guanajuato state election
July 2, 2006	Querétaro	State congress, 18 municipal presidents (mayors)	2006 Querétaro state election
July 2, 2006	Morelos	Governor, state congress, 33 municipal presidents (mayors)	2006 Morelos state election
July 2, 2006	Campeche	State congress, 11 municipal presidents (mayors)	2006 Campeche state election
July 2, 2006	San Luis Potosí	State congress	2006 San Luis Potosí state election
August 20, 2006	Chiapas	Governor	2006 Chiapas state election
October 15, 2006	Tabasco	Governor, state congress, 17 municipal presidents (mayors)	2006 Tabasco state election
October 15, 2006	San Luis Potosí	58 municipal presidents (mayors)	2006 San Luis Potosí state election

== See also ==
- Politics of Mexico
- List of political parties in Mexico
