= Christian Castro Bello =

Mexican politician (born 1984)

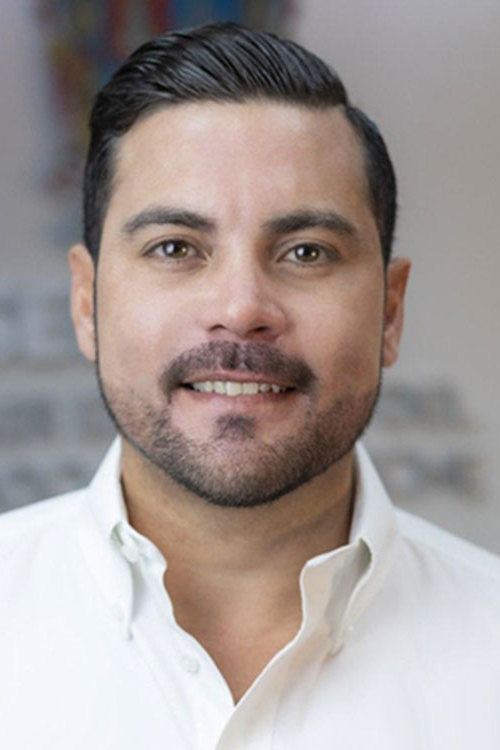
- Castro Bello in 2020

Member of the Chamber of Deputies
- Incumbent
- Assumed office 1 September 2024
- Constituency: Third electoral region

Personal details
- Born: 14 February 1984 (age 42) San Francisco de Campeche, Campeche, Mexico
- Party: Institutional Revolutionary Party
- Relatives: Alejandro Moreno Cárdenas (uncle)

Christian Mishel Castro Bello (Note: In this Spanish name, the first or paternal surname is Castro and the second or maternal family name is Bello.) (born 14 February 1984) is a Mexican politician from the Institutional Revolutionary Party (PRI). In the 2024 general election he was elected to a plurinominal seat in the Chamber of Deputies.

From 2015 to 2018, he was a member of the Congress of Campeche. In the 2018 general election he competed unsuccessfully for one of Campeche's seats in the Senate.

He contended for the governorship of Campeche in the 2021 local elections, representing the Va por Campeche coalition of the PRI, PAN and PRD. He placed third behind Eliseo Fernández Montúfar of the Citizens' Movement and the winner, Layda Sansores of Morena.

He is the nephew of the PRI's national president and former governor of Campeche, Alejandro Moreno Cárdenas.
