= March 2 =

March 2 this year in various calendars
- Monday, 2 March 2026
Akan	Nkyidwo
Armenian	15 Areg 1475
Aztec	Tecuilhuitontli 11, 13 Quiyahuitl
Babylonian	12 Shabatu, 2336 SE
Balinese pawukon	Luang, Pepet, Kajeng, Jaya, Pon, Urukung, Coma of Ugu, Kala, Gigis, Pati
Bengali	17 Falgun, BS 1432
Chinese	Yin Wood Pig・Exntended Net Mansion; Fire Horse Year, Month 1, Day 14 (Yushui, 3 days until Jingzhe)
Common Era	2 March 2026 CE
Coptic	23 Meshir, AM 1742
Egyptian	20 Epiphi, 2774 NE
Ethiopian	23 Yakātit, 2018 Amätä Məhrät
French Republican	Décade II, Duodi de Ventôse de l'Année 234 de la République
Gregorian	2 March, AD 2026
Hebrew	13 Adar, AM 5786
Hindu	Āśleṣā・Atigaṇḍa; Solar: 18 Phālguna, 1947 SE; Lunisolar: Caturdaśī, Śukla pakṣa of Phālguna, 2082 VE; Rāudra・5126 KY・1,872,636
Icelandic	Mánudagur, 9 Góa 2025
Islamic	13 Ramadan, AH 1447 (using tabular method)
ISO week date	2026-W10-1
Japanese	14 Mutsuki, Reiwa 8 (Usui, 3 days until Keichitsu)
Julian	17 February, AD 2026 (AM 7534)
Julian day	2461102
Korean	14 Horangidal, 4359 DE
Maya	13.0.13.6.19; 17 Kayab, 13 Cauac
Roman	ante diem XIII Kalendas Martias, MMDCCLXXIX AUC
Solar Hijri	11 Esfand, SH 1404
Tibetan	14 mchu, me pho rta 2153 or 1772 or 1000

<<	March					>>
Su	Mo	Tu	We	Th	Fr	Sa
1	2	3	4	5	6	7
8	9	10	11	12	13	14
15	16	17	18	19	20	21
22	23	24	25	26	27	28
29	30	31
2026

March 2 in recent years
2026 (Monday)
2025 (Sunday)
2024 (Saturday)
2023 (Thursday)
2022 (Wednesday)
2021 (Tuesday)
2020 (Monday)
2019 (Saturday)
2018 (Friday)
2017 (Thursday)

March 2 is the 61st day of the year (62nd in leap years) in the Gregorian calendar; 304 days remain until the end of the year.

== Events ==
=== Pre-1600 ===
- 537 – Siege of Rome: The Ostrogoth army under king Vitiges begins the siege of the capital. Belisarius conducts a delaying action outside the Flaminian Gate; he and a detachment of his bucellarii are almost cut off.
- 986 – Louis V becomes the last Carolingian king of West Francia after the death of his father, Lothaire.
- 1331 – Fall of Nicaea to the Ottoman Turks after a siege.
- 1444 – Skanderbeg organizes a group of Albanian nobles to form the League of Lezhë.
- 1458 – George of Poděbrady is chosen as the king of Bohemia.
- 1476 – Burgundian Wars: The Old Swiss Confederacy hands Charles the Bold, Duke of Burgundy, a major defeat in the Battle of Grandson in Canton of Neuchâtel.
- 1484 – The College of Arms is formally incorporated by Royal Charter signed by King Richard III of England.
- 1498 – Vasco da Gama's fleet visits the Island of Mozambique.

=== 1601–1900 ===
- 1657 – The Great Fire of Meireki begins in Edo (now Tokyo), Japan, causing more than 100,000 deaths before it exhausts itself three days later.
- 1776 – American Revolutionary War: Patriot militia units attempt to prevent capture of supply ships in and around the Savannah River by a small fleet of the Royal Navy in the Battle of the Rice Boats.
- 1791 – Claude Chappe demonstrates the first semaphore line near Paris.
- 1796 – Napoleon Bonaparte is appointed to command the Army of Italy.
- 1797 – The Bank of England issues the first one-pound and two-pound banknotes.
- 1807 – The U.S. Congress passes the Act Prohibiting Importation of Slaves, disallowing the importation of new slaves into the country.
- 1811 – Argentine War of Independence: A royalist fleet defeats a small flotilla of revolutionary ships in the Battle of San Nicolás on the River Plate.
- 1815 – Signing of the Kandyan Convention treaty by British invaders and the leaders of the Kingdom of Kandy.
- 1836 – Texas Revolution: The Declaration of independence of the Republic of Texas from Mexico is adopted.
- 1855 – Alexander II becomes Tsar of Russia.
- 1859 – The two-day Great Slave Auction, once thought to be the largest such auction in United States history, begins.
- 1864 – Ulysses S. Grant is promoted to lieutenant general, giving him command of all Union Armies.
- 1865 – East Cape War: The Völkner Incident in New Zealand.
- 1867 – The U.S. Congress passes the first Reconstruction Act.
- 1877 – Just two days before inauguration, the U.S. Congress declares Rutherford B. Hayes the winner of the 1876 U.S. presidential election even though Samuel J. Tilden had won the popular vote.
- 1882 – Queen Victoria narrowly escapes an assassination attempt by Roderick Maclean in Windsor.

=== 1901–present ===
- 1901 – United States Steel Corporation is founded as a result of a merger between Carnegie Steel Company and Federal Steel Company which became the first corporation in the world with a market capital over $1 billion.
- 1901 – The U.S. Congress passes the Platt Amendment limiting the autonomy of Cuba, as a condition of the withdrawal of American troops.
- 1903 – In New York City the Martha Washington Hotel opens, becoming the first hotel exclusively for women.
- 1917 – The enactment of the Jones–Shafroth Act grants Puerto Ricans United States citizenship.
- 1919 – The first Communist International meets in Moscow.
- 1932 – Finnish president P. E. Svinhufvud gives a radio speech, which four days later finally ends the Mäntsälä Rebellion and the far-right Lapua Movement that started it.
- 1933 – The film King Kong premieres in Radio City Music Hall and RKO Roxy in New York City.
- 1937 – The Steel Workers Organizing Committee signs a collective bargaining agreement with U.S. Steel, leading to unionization of the United States steel industry.
- 1939 – Cardinal Eugenio Pacelli is elected Pope and takes the name Pius XII.
- 1941 – World War II: First German military units enter Bulgaria after it joins the Axis Pact.
- 1943 – World War II: During the Battle of the Bismarck Sea Allied aircraft defeat a Japanese attempt to ship troops to New Guinea.
- 1949 – Captain James Gallagher lands his B-50 Superfortress Lucky Lady II in Fort Worth, Texas, after completing the first non-stop around-the-world airplane flight in 94 hours and one minute.
- 1955 – Norodom Sihanouk, king of Cambodia, abdicates the throne in favor of his father, Norodom Suramarit.
- 1962 – In Burma, the army led by General Ne Win seizes power in a coup d'état.
- 1962 – Wilt Chamberlain sets the single-game scoring record in the National Basketball Association by scoring 100 points.
- 1965 – The US and Republic of Vietnam Air Force begin Operation Rolling Thunder, a sustained bombing campaign against North Vietnam.
- 1968 – Baggeridge Colliery closes, marking the end of over 300 years of coal mining in the Black Country.
- 1969 – In Toulouse, France, the first test flight of the Anglo-French Concorde is conducted.
- 1970 – Rhodesia declares itself a republic, breaking its last links with the British crown.
- 1972 – The Pioneer 10 space probe is launched from Cape Canaveral, Florida with a mission to explore the outer planets.
- 1977 – Libya becomes the Socialist People's Libyan Arab Jamahiriya as the General People's Congress adopts the "Declaration on the Establishment of the Authority of the People".
- 1978 – Czech Vladimír Remek becomes the first non-Soviet or non-American to go into space, when he is launched aboard Soyuz 28.
- 1978 – The late iconic actor Charlie Chaplin's coffin is stolen from his grave in Switzerland.
- 1983 – Compact discs and players are released for the first time in the United States and other markets. They had previously been available only in Japan.
- 1986 – Aeroflot Flight F-77 crashes near Bugulma Airport, killing all 38 people aboard.
- 1989 – Twelve European Community nations agree to ban the production of all chlorofluorocarbons (CFCs) by the end of the century.
- 1990 – Nelson Mandela is elected deputy president of the African National Congress.
- 1991 – Establishment of Kuwait Democratic Forum, center-left political organization in Kuwait.
- 1991 – Battle at Rumaila oil field brings an end to the 1991 Gulf War.
- 1992 – Start of the war in Transnistria.
- 1992 – Armenia, Azerbaijan, Kazakhstan, Kyrgyzstan, Moldova, San Marino, Tajikistan, Turkmenistan and Uzbekistan, all of which (except San Marino) were former Soviet republics, join the United Nations.
- 1995 – Researchers at Fermilab announce the discovery of the top quark.
- 1995 – Space Shuttle Endeavour launches from the Kennedy Space Center on STS-67, carrying the ASTRO-2 spacelab observatory.
- 1998 – Data sent from the Galileo spacecraft indicates that Jupiter's moon Europa has a liquid ocean under a thick crust of ice.
- 2002 – U.S. invasion of Afghanistan: Operation Anaconda begins, (ending on March 19 after killing 500 Taliban and al-Qaeda fighters, with 11 Western troop fatalities).
- 2004 – War in Iraq: Al-Qaeda carries out the Ashoura Massacre in Iraq, killing 170 and wounding over 500.
- 2006 – In Monterrey, Mexico, a man identified as Diego Santoy Riveroll commits a double murder against two children, followed by an attempted murder of his ex-partner, Erika. The incident is popularly known as the Cumbres case.
- 2012 – A tornado outbreak occurs over a large section of the Southern United States and into the Ohio Valley region, resulting in 40 tornado-related fatalities.
- 2014 – The Oscar Selfie, regarded as one of the most influential and important images of all time, is taken at the 86th Academy Awards.
- 2017 – The elements Moscovium, Tennessine, and Oganesson are officially added to the periodic table at a conference in Moscow, Russia.
- 2022 – Russian forces capture the city of Kherson during the Russian invasion of Ukraine, which subsequently began the start of the Russian occupation and military-civilian administration in Kherson. Kherson is the only regional capital in Ukraine that Russia captured.
- 2026 – The Lebanese militant group Hezbollah launches several projectiles into northern Israel as a response to the assassination of Ali Khamenei, formally initiating the 2026 Lebanon War.

== Births ==
=== Pre-1600 ===
- 480 – Benedict of Nursia, Italian Christian saint (died 543 or 547)
- 1316 – Robert II of Scotland (died 1390)
- 1409 – Jean II, Duke of Alençon (died 1476)
- 1432 – Countess Palatine Margaret of Mosbach, countess consort of Hanau (died 1457)
- 1453 – Johannes Engel, German doctor, astronomer and astrologer (died 1512)
- 1459 – Pope Adrian VI (died 1523)
- 1481 – Franz von Sickingen, German knight (died 1523)
- 1545 – Thomas Bodley, English diplomat and scholar, founded the Bodleian Library (died 1613)
- 1577 – George Sandys, English traveller, colonist and poet (died 1644)

=== 1601–1900 ===
- 1628 – Cornelis Speelman, Governor-General of the Dutch East Indies (died 1684)
- 1651 – Carlo Gimach, Maltese architect, engineer and poet (died 1730)
- 1705 – William Murray, 1st Earl of Mansfield, Scottish lawyer, judge, and politician, Chancellor of the Exchequer (died 1793)
- 1740 – Nicholas Pocock, English naval painter (died 1821)
- 1760 – Camille Desmoulins, French journalist and politician (died 1794)
- 1769 – DeWitt Clinton, American lawyer and politician, 6th Governor of New York (died 1828)
- 1770 – Louis-Gabriel Suchet, French general (died 1826)
- 1779 – Joel Roberts Poinsett, American physician and politician, 15th United States Secretary of War (died 1851)
- 1793 – Sam Houston, American soldier and politician, 1st President of the Republic of Texas (died 1863)
- 1800 – Yevgeny Baratynsky, Russian-Italian poet and philosopher (died 1844)
- 1810 – Pope Leo XIII (died 1903)
- 1816 – Alexander Bullock, American lawyer and politician, 26th Governor of Massachusetts (died 1882)
- 1817 – János Arany, Hungarian journalist and poet (died 1882)
- 1820 – Multatuli, Dutch writer (died 1887)
- 1824 – Bedřich Smetana, Czech pianist and composer (died 1884)
- 1829 – Carl Schurz, German-American general, lawyer, and politician, 13th United States Secretary of the Interior (died 1906)
- 1836 – Henry Billings Brown, American lawyer and judge (died 1913)
- 1842 – Carl Jacobsen, Danish brewer, art collector, and philanthropist (died 1914)
- 1846 – Marie Roze, French soprano (died 1926)
- 1849 – Robert Means Thompson, American commander, lawyer, and businessman (died 1930)
- 1859 – Sholem Aleichem, Ukrainian-American author and playwright (died 1916)
- 1860 – Susanna M. Salter, American activist and politician (died 1961)
- 1862 – John Jay Chapman, American lawyer, author, and poet (died 1933)
- 1866 – Margaret Sibella Brown, Canadian bryologist (died 1961)
- 1869 – Julien Félix, French military officer and aviator (died 1914)
- 1876 – James A. Gilmore, American businessman and baseball executive (died 1947)
- 1876 – Pope Pius XII (died 1958)
- 1880 – René Vallon, French aviator (died 1911)
- 1886 – Willis H. O'Brien, American animator and director (died 1962)
- 1886 – Kurt Grelling, German logician and philosopher (died 1942)
- 1900 – Kurt Weill, German-American pianist and composer (died 1950)

=== 1901–present ===
- 1901 – Grete Hermann, German mathematician and philosopher (died 1984)
- 1902 – Moe Berg, American baseball player and spy (died 1972)
- 1902 – Edward Condon, American physicist and academic (died 1974)
- 1904 – Dr. Seuss, American children's book writer, poet, and illustrator (died 1991)
- 1905 – Marc Blitzstein, American composer and songwriter (died 1964)
- 1905 – Geoffrey Grigson, English poet and critic (died 1985)
- 1908 – Walter Bruch, German engineer (died 1990)
- 1909 – Mel Ott, American baseball player, manager, and sportscaster (died 1958)
- 1912 – Henry Katzman, American pianist, composer, and painter (died 2001)
- 1913 – Godfried Bomans, Dutch television host and author (died 1971)
- 1913 – Mort Cooper, American baseball player (died 1958)
- 1914 – Martin Ritt, American actor and film director (died 1990)
- 1915 – John Burton, Australian public servant and diplomat, Australian High Commissioner to Ceylon (died 2010)
- 1917 – Desi Arnaz, Cuban-American actor, singer, and producer (died 1986)
- 1917 – David Goodis, American author and screenwriter (died 1967)
- 1917 – Jim Konstanty, American baseball player and coach (died 1976)
- 1919 – Jennifer Jones, American actress (died 2009)
- 1919 – Eddie Lawrence, American actor, singer, and playwright (died 2014)
- 1919 – Tamara Toumanova, Russian-American ballerina and actress (died 1996)
- 1921 – Kazimierz Górski, Polish footballer and coach (died 2006)
- 1921 – Ernst Haas, Austrian-American photographer and journalist (died 1986)
- 1922 – Eddie "Lockjaw" Davis, American saxophonist (died 1986)
- 1922 – Bill Quackenbush, Canadian-American ice hockey player and coach (died 1999)
- 1922 – Frances Spence, American computer programmer (died 2012)
- 1923 – Basil Hume, English cardinal (died 1999)
- 1923 – Robert H. Michel, American soldier and politician (died 2017)
- 1923 – Dave Strack, American basketball player and coach (died 2014)
- 1924 – Cal Abrams, American baseball player (died 1997)
- 1924 – Renos Apostolidis, Greek philologist, author, and critic (died 2004)
- 1926 – Bernard Agré, Ivorian cardinal (died 2014)
- 1926 – Murray Rothbard, American economist and historian (died 1995)
- 1927 – Roger Walkowiak, French cyclist and economist (died 2017)
- 1930 – John Cullum, American actor and singer
- 1930 – Emma Penella, Spanish actress (died 2007)
- 1930 – Tom Wolfe, American journalist and author (died 2018)
- 1931 – Mikhail Gorbachev, Russian lawyer and politician, the 8th and final leader of the Soviet Union, Nobel Prize laureate (died 2022)
- 1932 – Gun Hägglund, Swedish journalist and translator (died 2011)
- 1933 – Leo Dillon, American illustrator (died 2012)
- 1934 – Howard Cassady, American football player (died 2019)
- 1934 – Dottie Rambo, American singer-songwriter (died 2008)
- 1935 – Gene Stallings, American football player and coach
- 1936 – Haroon Ahmed, Pakistani-English engineer and academic
- 1936 – John Tusa, Czech-English journalist and academic
- 1937 – Abdelaziz Bouteflika, Algerian soldier and politician, 5th President of Algeria (died 2021)
- 1938 – Clark Gesner, American author and composer (died 2002)
- 1938 – Ricardo Lagos, Chilean economist, lawyer, and politician, 33rd President of Chile
- 1938 – Lawrence Payton, American singer-songwriter and producer (died 1997)
- 1939 – Jan Howard Finder, American author and academic (died 2013)
- 1940 – Billy McNeill, Scottish footballer (died 2019)
- 1941 – John Cornell, Australian actor, director, and producer (died 2021)
- 1941 – David Satcher, American admiral and physician, 16th Surgeon General of the United States
- 1942 – John Irving, American novelist and screenwriter
- 1942 – Claude Larose, Canadian ice hockey player and coach
- 1942 – Mir-Hossein Mousavi, Iranian architect and politician, 79th Prime Minister of Iran
- 1942 – Lou Reed, American singer-songwriter, guitarist, producer, and actor (died 2013)
- 1942 – Derek Woodley, English footballer (died 2002)
- 1943 – George Layton, English actor, director, and screenwriter
- 1943 – Peter Straub, American author and poet (died 2022)
- 1943 – Robert Williams, American painter and cartoonist
- 1944 – Leif Segerstam, Finnish conductor and composer (died 2024)
- 1945 – Derek Watkins, English trumpet player and composer (died 2013)
- 1947 – John Dawkins, Australian politician
- 1947 – Nelson Ned, Brazilian singer-songwriter (died 2014)
- 1947 – Harry Redknapp, English footballer and manager
- 1948 – Larry Carlton, American guitarist and songwriter
- 1948 – Rory Gallagher, Irish singer-songwriter, guitarist, and producer (died 1995)
- 1948 – Jeff Kennett, Australian journalist and politician, 43rd Premier of Victoria
- 1948 – Carmen Lawrence, Australian politician, 25th Premier of Western Australia
- 1950 – Karen Carpenter, American singer (died 1983)
- 1952 – Mark Evanier, American author and screenwriter
- 1952 – Laraine Newman, American actress and comedian
- 1953 – Russ Feingold, American lawyer and politician
- 1953 – Kazuo Kitagawa, Japanese politician
- 1954 – Ed Johnstone, Canadian ice hockey player and coach
- 1955 – Dale Bozzio, American pop-rock singer-songwriter
- 1955 – Jay Osmond, American singer, drummer, actor, and TV/film producer
- 1955 – Ken Salazar, American lawyer and politician, 50th United States Secretary of the Interior
- 1955 – Steve Small, Australian cricketer
- 1956 – John Cowsill, American musician, songwriter, and producer
- 1956 – Mark Evans, Australian rock bass player
- 1957 – Mark Dean, American inventor and computer engineer
- 1957 – Hossein Dehghan, Iranian general and politician, Iranian Minister of Defense
- 1957 – Dito Tsintsadze, Georgian film director and screenwriter
- 1958 – Kevin Curren, South African-American tennis player
- 1958 – Ian Woosnam, English-Welsh golfer
- 1959 – Larry Stewart, American singer-songwriter and guitarist
- 1961 – Simone Young, Australian conductor, director, and composer
- 1962 – Jon Bon Jovi, American singer-songwriter, guitarist, producer, and actor
- 1962 – Paul Farrelly, English journalist and politician
- 1962 – Tom Nordlie, Norwegian footballer and coach
- 1962 – Brendan O'Connor, Australian politician, Australian Minister for Employment
- 1962 – Raimo Summanen, Finnish ice hockey player and coach
- 1962 – Gabriele Tarquini, Italian race car driver
- 1963 – Anthony Albanese, Australian politician, 31st Prime Minister of Australia
- 1963 – Alvin Youngblood Hart, American singer and guitarist
- 1964 – Laird Hamilton, American surfer and actor
- 1964 – Mike Von Erich, American wrestler (died 1987)
- 1965 – Ron Gant, American baseball player and journalist
- 1965 – Lembit Öpik, Northern Irish politician
- 1966 – Ann Leckie, American author
- 1966 – Simon Reevell, English lawyer and politician
- 1968 – Daniel Craig, English actor and producer
- 1970 – James Purnell, English politician, Secretary of State for Work and Pensions
- 1970 – Ciriaco Sforza, Swiss footballer and manager
- 1970 – Wibi Soerjadi, Dutch pianist and composer
- 1971 – Roman Čechmánek, Czech ice hockey player (died 2023)
- 1971 – Dave Gorman, English comedian, author and television presenter
- 1971 – Method Man, American rapper, record producer and actor
- 1972 – Mauricio Pochettino, Argentinian footballer and manager
- 1973 – Dejan Bodiroga, Serbian basketball player
- 1973 – Trevor Sinclair, English footballer and manager
- 1974 – Hayley Lewis, Australian swimmer and television host
- 1975 – Daryl Gibson, New Zealand rugby player
- 1977 – Dominique Canty, American basketball player and coach
- 1977 – Chris Martin, English singer-songwriter (Coldplay)
- 1977 – Heather McComb, American actress
- 1977 – Stephen Parry, English swimmer and sportscaster
- 1977 – Andrew Strauss, South African-English cricketer
- 1978 – Jim Chalmers, Australian politician
- 1978 – Gabby Eigenmann, Filipino actor and singer
- 1978 – Lee Hodges, English footballer and manager
- 1978 – Sebastian Janikowski, Polish gridiron football player
- 1978 – Tomáš Kaberle, Czech ice hockey player
- 1979 – Damien Duff, Irish footballer
- 1979 – Jim Troughton, English cricketer
- 1979 – Nicky Weaver, English footballer
- 1980 – Chris Barker, English footballer and manager (died 2020)
- 1980 – Edmund McMillen, American video game designer and artist
- 1980 – Rebel Wilson, Australian actress and screenwriter
- 1981 – Lance Cade, American wrestler (died 2010)
- 1981 – Bryce Dallas Howard, American actress
- 1982 – Kevin Kurányi, German footballer
- 1982 – Henrik Lundqvist, Swedish ice hockey player
- 1982 – Joel Lundqvist, Swedish ice hockey player
- 1982 – Ben Roethlisberger, American football player
- 1982 – Corey Webster, American football player
- 1983 – Deuce, American singer-songwriter and producer
- 1983 – Lisandro López, Argentine footballer
- 1983 – Jay McClement, Canadian ice hockey player
- 1983 – Glen Perkins, American baseball player
- 1983 – Ryan Shannon, American ice hockey player
- 1984 – Jonathan Ericsson, Swedish ice hockey player
- 1985 – Reggie Bush, American football player
- 1985 – Robert Iler, American actor
- 1985 – Suso Santana, Spanish footballer
- 1986 – Jonathan D'Aversa, Canadian ice hockey player
- 1986 – Jason Smith, American basketball player
- 1987 – Jonas Jerebko, Swedish basketball player
- 1988 – Édgar Andrade, Mexican footballer
- 1988 – James Arthur, English singer-songwriter
- 1988 – Laura Kaeppeler, American beauty queen, Miss America 2012
- 1988 – Matthew Mitcham, Australian diver
- 1988 – Dexter Pittman, American basketball player
- 1988 – Geert Arend Roorda, Dutch footballer
- 1989 – Toby Alderweireld, Belgian footballer
- 1989 – Alemão, Brazilian footballer
- 1989 – Nathalie Emmanuel, English actress
- 1989 – Marcel Hirscher, Austrian skier
- 1989 – André Bernardes Santos, Portuguese footballer
- 1989 – Shane Vereen, American football player
- 1989 – Chris Woakes, English cricketer
- 1990 – Rauno Alliku, Estonian footballer
- 1990 – Malcolm Butler, American football player
- 1990 – Luke Combs, American singer-songwriter
- 1990 – Tiger Shroff, Indian actor
- 1991 – Nick Franklin, American baseball player
- 1992 – Charlie Coyle, American ice hockey player
- 1993 – Nicolás Brussino, Argentine-Italian basketball player
- 1993 – Adolis García, Cuban baseball player
- 1995 – Miguel Andújar, Dominican baseball player
- 1995 – Max Domi, Canadian ice hockey player
- 1995 – Ange-Freddy Plumain, French footballer
- 1996 – Jin Longguo, Chinese singer based in South Korea
- 1997 – Arike Ogunbowale, American basketball player
- 1997 – Becky G, American singer and actress
- 1998 – Tua Tagovailoa, American football player
- 1999 – Isiah Pacheco, American football player
- 1999 – Iñaki Peña, Spanish footballer
- 2000 – Bárbara Domingos, Brazilian rhythmic gymnast
- 2000 – Illan Meslier, French footballer
- 2002 – Brooks Barnhizer, American basketball player
- 2006 – Windy Zhan, Hong Kong singer and actress
- 2016 – Prince Oscar, Duke of Skåne

== Deaths ==
=== Pre-1600 ===
- 274 – Mani, Persian prophet and founder of Manichaeism (born 216)
- 672 – Chad of Mercia, English bishop and saint (born 634)
- 968 – William, archbishop of Mainz (born 929)
- 986 – Lothair, king of West Francia (born 941)
- 1009 – Mokjong, king of Goryeo (born 980)
- 1127 – Charles the Good, Count of Flanders (born 1084)
- 1316 – Marjorie Bruce, Scottish daughter of Robert the Bruce (born 1296)
- 1333 – Wladyslaw I, king of Poland (born 1261)
- 1589 – Alessandro Farnese, Italian cardinal and diplomat (born 1520)

=== 1601–1900 ===
- 1619 – Anne of Denmark, Queen Consort of England, Scotland and Ireland (born 1574)
- 1729 – Francesco Bianchini, Italian astronomer and philosopher (born 1662)
- 1755 – Louis de Rouvroy, French duke and diplomat (born 1675)
- 1791 – John Wesley, English cleric and theologian (born 1703)
- 1793 – Carl Gustaf Pilo, Swedish-Danish painter and academic (born 1711)
- 1797 – Horace Walpole, English historian and politician (born 1717)
- 1829 – Josefa Ortiz de Domínguez, Mexican revolutionary (born ca. 1773)
- 1830 – Samuel Thomas von Sömmerring, German physician, anatomist, and anthropologist (born 1755)
- 1835 – Francis II, Holy Roman Emperor (born 1768)
- 1840 – Heinrich Wilhelm Matthias Olbers, German physician and astronomer (born 1758)
- 1855 – Nicholas I, Russian emperor (born 1796)
- 1864 – Ulric Dahlgren, American colonel (born 1842)
- 1865 – Carl Sylvius Völkner, German-New Zealand priest and missionary (born 1819)
- 1880 – John Benjamin Macneill, Irish engineer (born 1790)
- 1895 – Berthe Morisot, French painter (born 1841)
- 1895 – Isma'il Pasha, Egyptian politician (born 1830)
- 1896 – Jubal Early, American general (born 1816)

=== 1901–present ===
- 1921 – Champ Clark, American lawyer and politician, 41st Speaker of the United States House of Representatives (born 1850)
- 1930 – D. H. Lawrence, English novelist, poet, playwright, and critic (born 1885)
- 1938 – Ben Harney, American pianist and composer (born 1871)
- 1939 – Howard Carter, English archaeologist and historian (born 1874)
- 1943 – Gisela Januszewska, Austrian physician (born 1867)
- 1944 – Ida Maclean, British biochemist, the first woman admitted to the London Chemical Society (born 1877)
- 1945 – Emily Carr, Canadian painter and author (born 1871)
- 1946 – Fidél Pálffy, Hungarian politician, Hungarian Minister of Agriculture (born 1895)
- 1946 – George E. Stewart, American colonel, Medal of Honor recipient (born 1872)
- 1947 – Frans Johan Louwrens Ghijsels, Dutch architect and urban planner (born 1882)
- 1949 – Sarojini Naidu, Indian poet and activist (born 1879)
- 1953 – James Lightbody, American runner (born 1882)
- 1957 – Selim Sırrı Tarcan, Turkish educator and politician (born 1874)
- 1958 – Fred Merkle, American baseball player and manager (born 1888)
- 1962 – Charles Jean de la Vallée-Poussin, Belgian mathematician and academic (born 1866)
- 1967 – José Martínez Ruiz, Spanish author and critic (born 1873)
- 1972 – Léo-Ernest Ouimet, Canadian director and producer (born 1877)
- 1977 – Eugénie Brazier, French chef (born 1895)
- 1979 – Christy Ring, Irish hurler (born 1920)
- 1982 – Philip K. Dick, American philosopher and author (born 1928)
- 1987 – Randolph Scott, American actor and director (born 1898)
- 1987 – Lolo Soetoro, Indonesian geographer and academic (born 1935)
- 1991 – Serge Gainsbourg, French singer-songwriter, actor, and director (born 1928)
- 1992 – Sandy Dennis, American actress (born 1937)
- 1994 – Anita Morris, American actress, singer, and dancer (born 1943)
- 1999 – Dusty Springfield, English singer (born 1939)
- 2000 – Sandra Schmirler, Canadian curler (born 1963)
- 2003 – Hank Ballard, American singer-songwriter (born 1927)
- 2003 – Malcolm Williamson, Australian pianist and composer (born 1931)
- 2004 – Cormac McAnallen, Irish footballer (born 1980)
- 2004 – Mercedes McCambridge, American actress (born 1916)
- 2004 – Marge Schott, American businesswoman (born 1928)
- 2005 – Martin Denny, American pianist and composer (born 1911)
- 2007 – Thomas S. Kleppe, American soldier and politician, 41st United States Secretary of the Interior (born 1919)
- 2007 – Clem Labine, American baseball player (born 1926)
- 2007 – Ivan Safronov, Russian colonel and journalist (born 1956)
- 2007 – Henri Troyat, Russian-French historian and author (born 1911)
- 2008 – Jeff Healey, Canadian singer-songwriter and guitarist (born 1966)
- 2009 – João Bernardo Vieira, Bissau-Guinean politician, President of Guinea-Bissau (born 1939)
- 2009 – Shigeru Morita, Japanese painter (born 1907)
- 2010 – Winston Churchill, English journalist and politician (born 1940)
- 2012 – Lawrence Anthony, South African environmentalist, explorer, and author (born 1950)
- 2012 – Van T. Barfoot, American colonel, Medal of Honor recipient (born 1919)
- 2012 – Norman St John-Stevas, English academic and politician, Chancellor of the Duchy of Lancaster (born 1929)
- 2012 – James Q. Wilson, American political scientist and academic (born 1931)
- 2013 – Peter Harvey, Australian journalist (born 1944)
- 2013 – Giorgos Kolokithas, Greek basketball player (born 1945)
- 2013 – Shabnam Shakeel, Pakistani poet and author (born 1942)
- 2014 – Ryhor Baradulin, Belarusian poet and translator (born 1935)
- 2015 – Dean Hess, American minister and colonel (born 1917)
- 2015 – Dave Mackay, Scottish-English footballer and manager (born 1934)
- 2015 – Mal Peet, English author and illustrator (born 1947)
- 2016 – Benoît Lacroix, Canadian priest, historian, and philosopher (born 1915)
- 2016 – Aubrey McClendon, American businessman (born 1959)
- 2018 – Billy Herrington, American actor (born 1969)
- 2018 – Lin Hu, Chinese lieutenant general (born 1927)
- 2019 – Mike Oliver, British sociologist, disability rights activist (born 1945)
- 2024 – Janice Burgess, American television executive, screenwriter, and producer (born 1952)
- 2024 – Jaclyn Jose, Filipino actress (born 1963)

== Holidays and observances ==
- Air Force Day (Sri Lanka)
- Baloch Culture Day (Balochistan)
- Christian feast day:
  - Agnes of Bohemia
  - Angela of the Cross
  - Blessed Charles the Good, Count of Flanders
  - Chad of Mercia (Catholic Church, Anglican Communion, Eastern Orthodox Church)
  - John Maron
  - March 2 (Eastern Orthodox liturgics)
- Feast of 'Alá (Loftiness), First day of the 19th month of the Baháʼí calendar (Baháʼí Faith) and first day of the Baháʼí Nineteen Day Fast
- National Read Across America Day (United States)
- Peasants' Day (Myanmar)
- Texas Independence Day
- Adwa Victory Day (Ethiopia)
