= Marcel Loridan =

French aviator

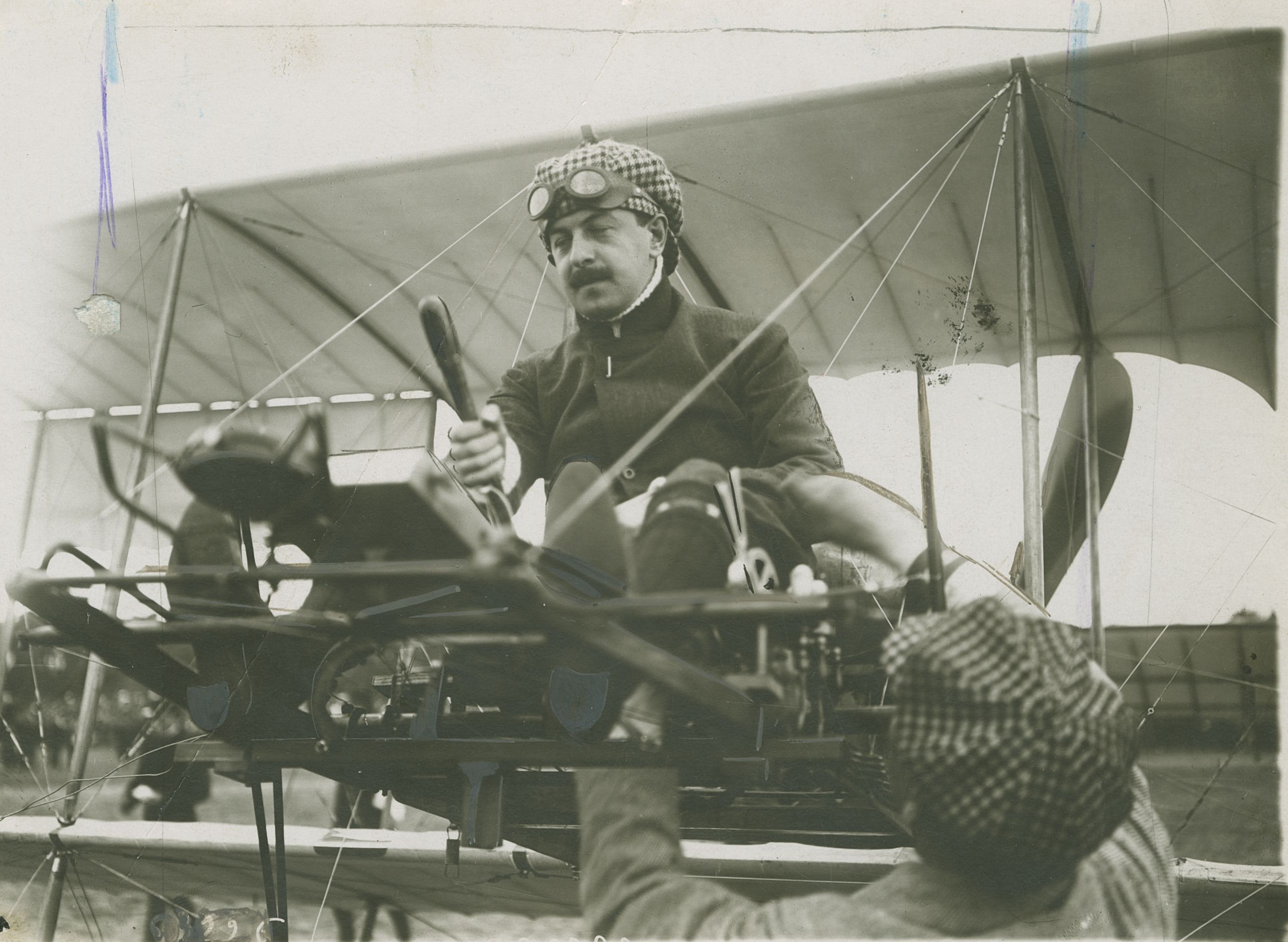
Marcel Loridan aboard his biplane Farman II in 1910

Marcel Loridan (4 December 1883 - 1971) was a French pioneer aviator.

Loridan was born in 1883 in Paris. On 19 September 1910 he received aviator brevet n° 241.

On 8 July 1911, he broke the world altitude record when he reached 3,280 metres in his Farman biplane. The ascent, starting from the Camp de Châlons, took 1 hour and 23 minutes. The previous record was set by Georges Legagneux on 8 December 1910 in Pau, when he reached 3,100 metres in a Blériot plane with a Gnome engine. Other sources claim that the record of Legagneux was only broken on 5 August 1911, by Julien Félix. Soon after his altitude record, Loridan also set new records for longest flights in time and distance and won the Michelin Cup.

During the First World War he was a pilot in the French Army. He was decorated with the Croix de guerre 1914–1918. He died in May 1971 at Chartres.
