= Fernando Ortega Bernés =

Mexican politician

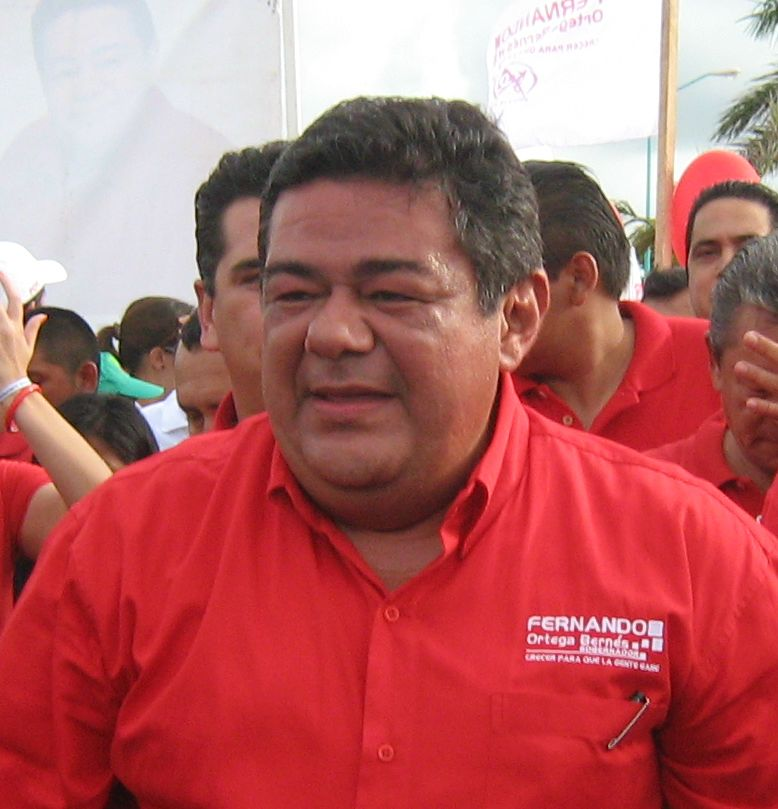
- Ortega campaigning in the city of Campeche, 2009

16th Governor of Campeche
- In office September 16, 2009 – September 15, 2015
- Preceded by: Jorge Carlos Hurtado Valdez
- Succeeded by: Alejandro Moreno Cárdenas

Personal details
- Born: February 16, 1958 (age 68) Campeche, Campeche
- Party: Institutional Revolutionary Party

Fernando Ortega Bernés (born February 16, 1958) is a Mexican politician PRI who served as the 16th Governor of Campeche from 2009 to 2015. He has previously served as a mayor and local state senator in Campeche.

Ortega Bernes was born on February 16, 1958, in the city of Campeche. He holds a bachelor's degree in political science and public administration. Ortega Bernes has taught at the Universidad Autónoma de Campeche.

== See also ==
- List of presidents of Campeche Municipality

Political offices
Preceded by Jorge Carlos Hurtado Valdez	Governor of Campeche; 2009–2015	Succeeded by Alejandro Moreno Cárdenas
