= Titan Corporation =

US Corporation

- Formerly: Titan Systems Inc.
- Type: Public
- Traded as: NYSE: TTN
- Industry: Telecommunications (main)
- Founded: May 1981
- Founder: Gene W. Ray
- Defunct: June 3, 2005
- Fate: Acquired by L-3 Communications
- Headquarters: 3033 Science Park Road; San Diego, California 92121-1199
- Revenue: $2.046525 billion (2004)
- Operating income: $7.0947 million (2004)
- Net income: -$38.397 million (2004)
- Total assets: $1.357766 billion (2004)
- Total equity: $348.080 million (2004)
- Number of employees: ~12,000 (February 2005)

Titan Corporation was a United States–based company that started as a telecommunications defense contractor with its headquarters located in San Diego, California. It was acquired by L-3 Communications on June 3, 2005 for $2.65 billion and operated as the "Titan Group" of L-3 Communications thereafter. In early 2007, divisions using the Titan Group name were internally directed to discontinue use of the "Titan" moniker and were given new names.

== History ==
The company was founded in 1981 by Gene W. Ray, who previously worked for 11 years as an executive for the Science Applications International Corporation. Originally known as Titan Systems, Inc, the company took on its final name in May 1985 upon merging with Electronic Memories & Magnetics for $26 million in stock. It went public in 1987. Titan specialized in providing information and communications products, solutions, and services for intelligence agencies and the federal government, including the Department of Homeland Security.

In 1997, Titan had a revenue of $171 million. In 1998, Titan announced that it would buy two companies, Visicom Inc. and Delfin Systems Inc., "for about $47.5 million in stock to expand its computer business."

Like other defense companies, Titan diversified through a series of acquisitions over its lifetime, starting in 1988, and engaged in 10 from 2000 until its acquisition a few years later. The acquisitions began after defense spending increases were reduced, and the company sought commercial opportunities for technologies it developed. The firm got into the linguistic business in the wake of 9/11 by acquiring Fairfax, Virginia–based BTG Inc., which had a $10 million military contract dating back to 1999. When the demand for linguists grew after the United States launched the war on terror, so did the size of Titan's contracts. After the sale of Titan Corporation to L-3 Communications, several Titan executives went on to head Kratos Defense and Security Solutions (formerly WFI), which has also similarly been diversifying through a series of acquisitions. Titan also diversified into medical product sterilization in 1992 and electronic pasteurization and irradiation systems for ground beef in 1999.

== Contracts received ==
Titan was hired by the US military in 2003 to provide translation services, receiving $112.1 million. This accounted for 6 percent of its total revenue for 2003, according to its annual report. The company had 12,000 employees worldwide, with annual revenues in the neighborhood of $2 billion and was traded on the NYSE as TTN.

Titan had a $54.8 million contract with the Airborne Warning and Control System to support the development of spy planes. They also had an $18 million contract to design war games for the US Navy.

Titan received a competitive contract with a potential value of $163.9 million from the US Army Space and Missile Defense Command on behalf of the U.S. Northern Command for the US Joint Task Force Civil Support on January 12, 2005. The contract is "to provide a full range of planning, analysis, exercise, and information technology services for Chemical, Biological, Radiological, Nuclear, and High-Yield Explosive (CBRNE) Consequence Management operations," a Titan press release announced.

Titan announced on February 14, 2006, they had received a "$350 million, five-year, multiple award, indefinite-delivery, indefinite-quantity (ID/IQ) task-based contract" from the Department of Homeland Security to support the National Exercise Program.

== Legal controversies ==
- As a public military contractor, the company employed some of the personnel who were implicated in the prisoner abuse scandal at Abu Ghraib prison in 2004. Involving mostly Titan and CACI International employees, the U.S. Army "found that contractors were involved in 36 percent of the [Abu Ghraib] proven incidents and identified 6 employees as individually culpable". None of these personnel were prosecuted.

In May 2004, Titan employee Adel Nakhla, an Egyptian-born American citizen, was terminated from his job after he admitted he held down inmates that were "nude, handcuffed to each other and placed in sexual positions" (as described by the Taguba Report).

- The company was in the process of being acquired by the Lockheed Martin Corporation, but the attempted merger fell through on June 26, 2004:

Lockheed Martin Corporation announced that it has terminated the merger agreement with The Titan Corporation because Titan did not satisfy all the closing conditions on or before June 25, 2004. Under the terms of the amended merger agreement, either party could terminate the merger agreement if Titan either (i) had not obtained written confirmation from the Department of Justice that the investigation of alleged Foreign Corrupt Practices Act (FCPA) violations was resolved as to Titan and the Department did not intend to pursue any claims against Titan; or (ii) Titan had not entered into a plea agreement on or prior to June 25, 2004, provided that the terminating party had not contributed to the failure to consummate the merger through a breach of its obligations in any material respect. Titan did not satisfy either requirement.

- On March 2, 2005, the company admitted to illegally providing $2 million to the 2001 re-election campaign of President Mathieu Kérékou of Benin, and agreed to pay $28.5 million in fines and civil penalties. Titan pleaded guilty and paid the largest penalty under the Foreign Corrupt Practices Act up to that point for bribery and filing false tax returns.
- Titan Corp briefly partnered with SkyWay Communications and owned stock in several other corporations related to SkyWay. SkyWay's former DC9 aircraft, N900SA, was captured in April 2006 with 5.5 tons of cocaine on board. Investigation of the cocaine bust by Mad Cow Morning News led to the discovery that Titan had employed Makram Chams, a Lebanese national. Chams owned a Kwik-Check convenience store in Venice, Florida, where the biggest overseas money transfer to the 9/11 terrorists ($70,000 from the UAE) was sent, according to the testimony of FBI agents during the 9/11 Commission hearings.
