= Hybristophilia =

Romanticization of criminals

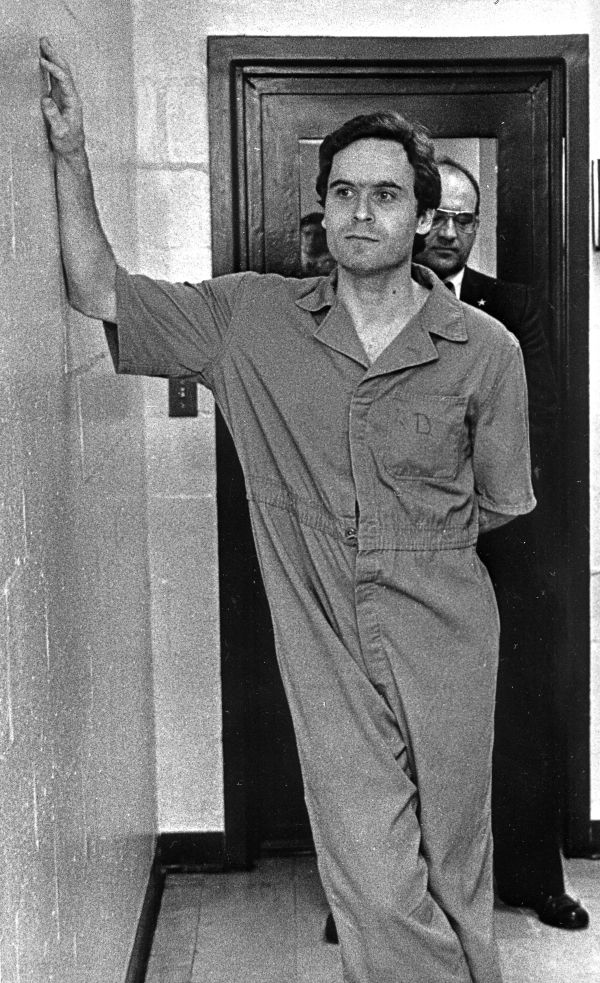
Serial killer Ted Bundy was a subject of widespread hybristophilia, with many women writing him love letters and attending his trials.

Hybristophilia is sexual interest in and attraction to those who commit crimes. The term hybristophilia was coined by John Money in 1986 and is derived from the Greek word hubrizein (ὑβρίζειν), meaning "to commit an outrage against someone" (ultimately derived from hubris ὕβρις, "hubris"), and philo, meaning "having a strong affinity/preference for". In popular culture, this phenomenon is also known as the "Bonnie and Clyde syndrome."

== Manifestation ==
Manifestations of hybristophilia include the romanticization of criminals, especially serial killers. Many high-profile criminals, particularly those who have committed atrocious crimes, receive "fan mail" in prison that is sometimes amorous or sexual, presumably because of this phenomenon. Women who write pen-pal letters to or even pursue men who are incarcerated for a crime are sometimes referred to as a prison groupie or a serial killer groupie. Although rare, hybristophilia has also been reported in men. In some cases, admirers of these criminals have gone on to marry the object of their affections in prison. Social media contributions for an easier method of showcasing attraction to the criminal hybristophilia have also been discussed; a 2023 paper stated that "If social media platforms including TikTok provide users with the ability to freely express themselves publicly and anonymously, then individuals wanting to showcase and share their affection and admiration for criminal offenders might opt to utilize these platforms for this purpose."

== Causes ==
Some speculations have been offered as to the cause of hybristophilia. Katherine Ramsland, a professor of forensic psychology at DeSales University, mentions that some of the women who have married or dated male serial killers have offered the following reasons: "Some believe they can change a man as cruel and powerful as a serial killer. Others 'see' the little boy that the killer once was and seek to nurture him. A few hoped to share in the media spotlight or get a book or movie deal. Then there's the notion of the 'perfect boyfriend'. She knows where he is at all times, and she knows he's thinking about her. While she can claim that someone loves her, she does not have to endure the day-to-day issues involved in most relationships. There's no laundry to do, no cooking for him, and no accountability to him. She can keep the fantasy charged up for a long time." Ramsland also states "Some mental health experts have compared infatuation with killers to extreme forms of fanaticism. They view such women as insecure females who cannot find love in normal ways or as 'love-avoidant' females who seek romantic relationships that cannot be consummated", though she notes that there are also several examples of hybristophiliacs who are beautiful, educated, and married.

Psychologist Leon F. Seltzer proposes the condition could be related to the riskiness involved with dating a criminal, the desire to tame or fix them, and primitive instincts based on evolutionary psychology. In the latter theory, he mentions dominance is attractive as it would mean such men could protect women and their offspring, according to evolutionary history. Seltzer says women today may consciously realize that it is unwise to date a serial killer, but they are nevertheless attracted to them; he stated, "as a therapist I've encountered many women who bemoaned their vulnerability toward dominant men who, consciously, they recognized were all wrong for them". As evidence of women's fantasy preference for dominant men, he refers to the book A Billion Wicked Thoughts: What the World's Largest Experiment Reveals about Human Desire by Ogi Ogas and Sai Gaddam. Seltzer discusses Ogas and Gaddam's argument that this fantasy is the dominant plot of most erotic/romantic books and movies written for women, but the fantasy always holds that this male dominance is conditional, "it doesn't really represent the man's innermost reality". He also says in reality, very few women are actually swayed by these "primitive instincts".

Elizabeth Gurian wrote that hybristophilia may be a result of an individual being the victim of abuse or having a stimulation-seeking behavior. A linkage was also made to the case of it being for the purpose of 'controlling fear', in which people consciously or unconsciously deny the threat in accordance with the extended parallel process model.

== Notable examples ==
- Jodi Arias, a woman from Yreka, California, obtained her household name status when she was convicted of the 2008 murder of her ex-boyfriend, Travis Alexander. Her 2013 trial became a national media sensation due to its highly salacious and graphic nature, involving themes of obsession, sex and Mormonism. Due to her publicly recognized attractive physical appearance and well-spoken manner seen in TV interviews, she captured massive amounts of sympathy and fascination from fans. During her stay in Estrella jail awaiting trial, Arias had up to 27 supporters chatting with her as well as taking screenshots of Arias smiling on video calls, 10 of whom got subsequently banned from contacting Arias for issuing false IDs. Since her incarceration at Perryville prison, Arias still consistently receives fan mail worldwide expressing love and support, some of which occasionally contains sexually explicit messages or pictures from male fans.
- One of the most infamous examples of hybristophilia is the large number of women attracted to Ted Bundy after his arrest. He often drew scores of women at the jammed courtrooms of his trials each day. Bundy allegedly received hundreds of love letters from women while he was incarcerated, and married a woman, Carole Ann Boone, whom he had met while both were working in the State of Washington. He proposed to her in the middle of proceedings while Boone was on the witness stand. Boone gave birth to a daughter whom it was believed Bundy had fathered.
- Jeffrey Dahmer, a serial killer and cannibal, is said to have had amorous women sending him letters, money, and other gifts during his time in prison despite him being a gay man.
- Richard Ramirez, the "Night Stalker" who killed 13 people and had "more than a passing interest" in Satanism, had fans who would write him letters and pay him visits. This included Doreen Lioy, who married him in California's San Quentin State Prison on October 3, 1996.
- Cult leader Charles Manson's groupies were examples of hybristophiliacs.
- Lyle and Erik Menendez, American brothers convicted of the 1989 murders of their parents in Beverly Hills, received significant attention from members of the public during and after their high-profile trials, including romantic correspondence and relationships initiated while they were incarcerated; both brothers married women who first wrote to them after encountering their case through television. Lyle's first wife, Anna Eriksson, initially wrote to him during his trial before they married by telephone from prison, and he subsequently married Rebecca Sneed after a long history of correspondence. Erik married Tammi Saccoman, who began writing to him during his trial before they met in person and wed in prison. The case also experienced renewed public interest on social media in the early 2020s, particularly on the video-sharing platform TikTok, where users—often young, female adults—created and shared content highlighting the brothers' physical attractiveness.
- Outside the English-speaking world, the case of Diego Santoy Riveroll in Mexico stands out. He was the perpetrator of the Cumbres murders in 2006 and was sentenced to several years in prison for the double homicide and attempted murder of his ex-partner Erika Peña Coss and her younger siblings. During his incarceration, he married one of his fans and raised a child with her.
- Since the advent of social media, a fandom for Eric Harris and Dylan Klebold, perpetrators of the Columbine High School massacre has had a documented presence on social media sites, especially Tumblr and TikTok. Fans of Harris and Klebold refer to themselves as "Columbiners". A qualitative study published in 2015 on the fan cultures surrounding Harris and Klebold found that "Columbiners" function similar to other fandoms, engaging in fan art, fan fiction, and cosplay.
- Nikolas Cruz, the perpetrator of the Parkland high school shooting, received fan mail and love letters from admirers, including suggestive photos from women and teenagers. Multiple senders of letters also offered to send Cruz money. Cruz returned letters to a woman from the United Kingdom, and in them he wrote that he wanted to marry her and have three children with her named after guns.
- Following the December 2024 arrest of Luigi Mangione, accused of killing UnitedHealthcare CEO Brian Thompson, media coverage documented supporters (sometimes called "Mangionistas") attending court hearings and sharing content online. Psychologist Carly Dober, quoted in a May 2026 news.com.au report, described parasocial "I can fix him" dynamics and stated that the fandom "shows tendencies of hybristophilia," while also noting economic and Robin Hood-style contextual appeal. Other reporting has made similar points. Merchandise was created depicting Mangione in romantic contexts and he became the subject of erotic fan fiction.

== See also ==
- True Crime Community
- Murderabilia
- List of paraphilias
