= Alito =

Alito may refer to:

- Alito Moreno (born 1975), president of Mexico's Institutional Revolutionary Party
- Samuel Alito (born 1950), associate justice of the United States Supreme Court
