= Víctor Manuel Méndez Lanz =

Mexican politician

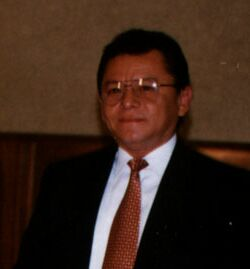
- Born: 21 February 1952 (age 74); Campeche, Campeche, Mexico
- Education: ITESM; Florida International University
- Occupation: Politician
- Political party: PRI

Víctor Manuel Méndez Lanz (born 21 February 1952) is a Mexican politician affiliated with the Institutional Revolutionary Party. As of 2014 he served as Senator of the LVIII and LIX Legislatures of the Mexican Congress representing Campeche, as Deputy of the LX Legislature and as Municipal President of Campeche between 1997 and 2000.

== See also ==
- List of presidents of Campeche Municipality
