= List of municipal presidents of Campeche Municipality =

The following is a list of municipal presidents of Campeche Municipality, Mexico. The municipality includes Campeche City.

== List of officials ==
- Joaquín Esquivel Cantón, 1916-1917
- Cristóbal Donantes Virgilio, 1918
- Marcelo Gómez, 1919
- Francisco G. Torres, 1920
- Ramón Félix Flores, 1921
- Eduardo Mena Córdoba, 1922
- Angel Castillo Lanz, 1923
- Javier Illescas A., 1924-1925
- Ulises Sansores, 1926-1927
- Domingo Pérez Méndez, 1928-1929
- Víctor Velázquez Marina, 1930-1931
- Eduardo Arceo Zumárraga, 1932-1933
- Miguel Lanz Gutiérrez, 1934-1935
- Manuel S. Silva M., 1936-1937
- Domingo Granados M., 1938-1939
- Eduardo Lavalle Urbina, 1940-1941
- Asunción Martínez Camargo, 1942-1943
- Francisco Alvarez Barret, 1944-1946
- Rafael Alcalá Dónde, 1947-1949
- Fernando Rosado Reyes, 1950-1952
- Alberto Ferrer Ferrer, 1953-1955
- Leovigilio Gómez Hernández, 1956-1958
- Eugenio Echeverría Castellón, 1959-1961
- Ricardo Castelot Oliver, 1962-1964
- Rafael Rodríguez Barrera, 1965-1967
- Luis Vera Esquivel, 1968-1970
- Enrique Escalante Escalante, 1971-1973
- Alvaro Arceo Corcuera, 1974-1976
- Carlos Pérez Cámara, 1977-1979
- Tirso R. de la Gala, 1980-1982
- Edilberto Buenfil Montalvo, 1983-1985
- José Medina Maldonado, 1986-1988
- Jorge Luis González Curi, 1989-1991
- Gabriel Escalante Castillo, 1992-1994
- Antonio González Curi, 1995-1997
- Javier Buenfil Osorio, 1997
- Víctor Manuel Méndez Lanz, 1997-2000
- Jorge Carlos Hurtado Valdez, 2000-2003
- Fernando Ortega Bernés, 2003-2006
- Edgar Román Hernández Hernández, 2015-2018
- Eliseo Fernández Montufar, 2018-current
- Biby Karen Rabelo (MC) starting 2021

== See also ==
- Campeche state election, 2018
- Campeche state election, 2012
- Timeline of Campeche City
