= Carlos Miguel Aysa González =

Mexican politician

Governor of Campeche
- In office July 13, 2019 – September 14, 2021
- Preceded by: Alejandro Moreno Cárdenas
- Succeeded by: Layda Elena Sansores

Personal details
- Born: August 21, 1950 (age 74); Palizada, Campeche, Mexico
- Political party: Institutional Revolutionary Party
- Spouse: Victoria Damas de Aysa
- Education: La Salle University (LLB)

Carlos Miguel Aysa González (born August 21, 1950), is a Mexican politician, interim Governor of Campeche from 2019 to 2021. He studied for a law degree from Universidad La Salle.

== Early years ==
Carlos Miguel Aysa González was born on August 21, 1950, in Palizada, Campeche. He studied a law degree at La Salle University in Mexico City from 1972 to 1977.

== Political career ==
In 1994, he was appointed as Deputy in the Congress of Campeche representing Palizada Municipality. From July 1, 2004, to September 15, 2009, he served as Secretary of Public Security of the State of Campeche.

On June 14, 2017, he was designated as General Secretary of Interior of Campeche.

== Governor of Campeche ==
On June 13, 2019, then governor Alejandro Moreno Cárdenas requested to leave from office to the Congress of Campeche, who chose Aysa González as substitute governor, with the vote in favor of 32 of 35 deputies present.
