= Jorge Carlos Hurtado Valdez =

Mexican politician (born 1949)

Jorge Carlos Hurtado
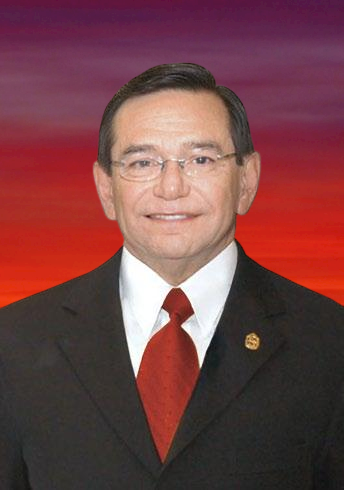

Governor of Campeche
- In office September 16, 2003 – September 15, 2009
- Preceded by: José Antonio González Curi
- Succeeded by: Fernando Ortega Bernés

Personal details
- Born: March 22, 1949 (age 77) Campeche, Campeche
- Party: Institutional Revolutionary Party
- Spouse: Carmen Montero de Hurtado
- Profession: Accountant

Jorge Carlos Hurtado Valdez (born March 22, 1949) is a Mexican politician and former governor of Campeche. A member of the Institutional Revolutionary Party (PRI), he took office on September 16, 2003. Previous, he served as Secretary of Public Works and Communication for the state of Campeche from September 16, 1997 to March 29, 2000 and mayor of Campeche from October 1, 2000 until November 6, 2002.

== See also ==
- List of presidents of Campeche Municipality

Preceded by Fernando Soto Angli	Municipal president of Campeche; 2000 - 2002	Succeeded by Alejandrino del Pilar Moreno Ortiz
Preceded by José Antonio González Curi	Governor of Campeche; 2003 - 2009	Succeeded by Fernando Ortega Bernes
