= Armando Labra =

Mexican economist

Armando Labra (October 27, 1988) is a Mexican economist, and the technical secretary for the Planification Counsel of the UNAM.

== Biography ==
Born in the State of Mexico related to Wenceslao Labra, the ex-governor for the State of Mexico. He studied at the National School of Economy in Mexico, and continued his studies at Berkeley. He is a federal congressman for the State of Mexico. He opposed neo-liberalism, and left the PRI.

== Sources ==
- "Most widely held works by Armando Labra". WorldCat.
