= Galia Moss =

Mexican adventurer

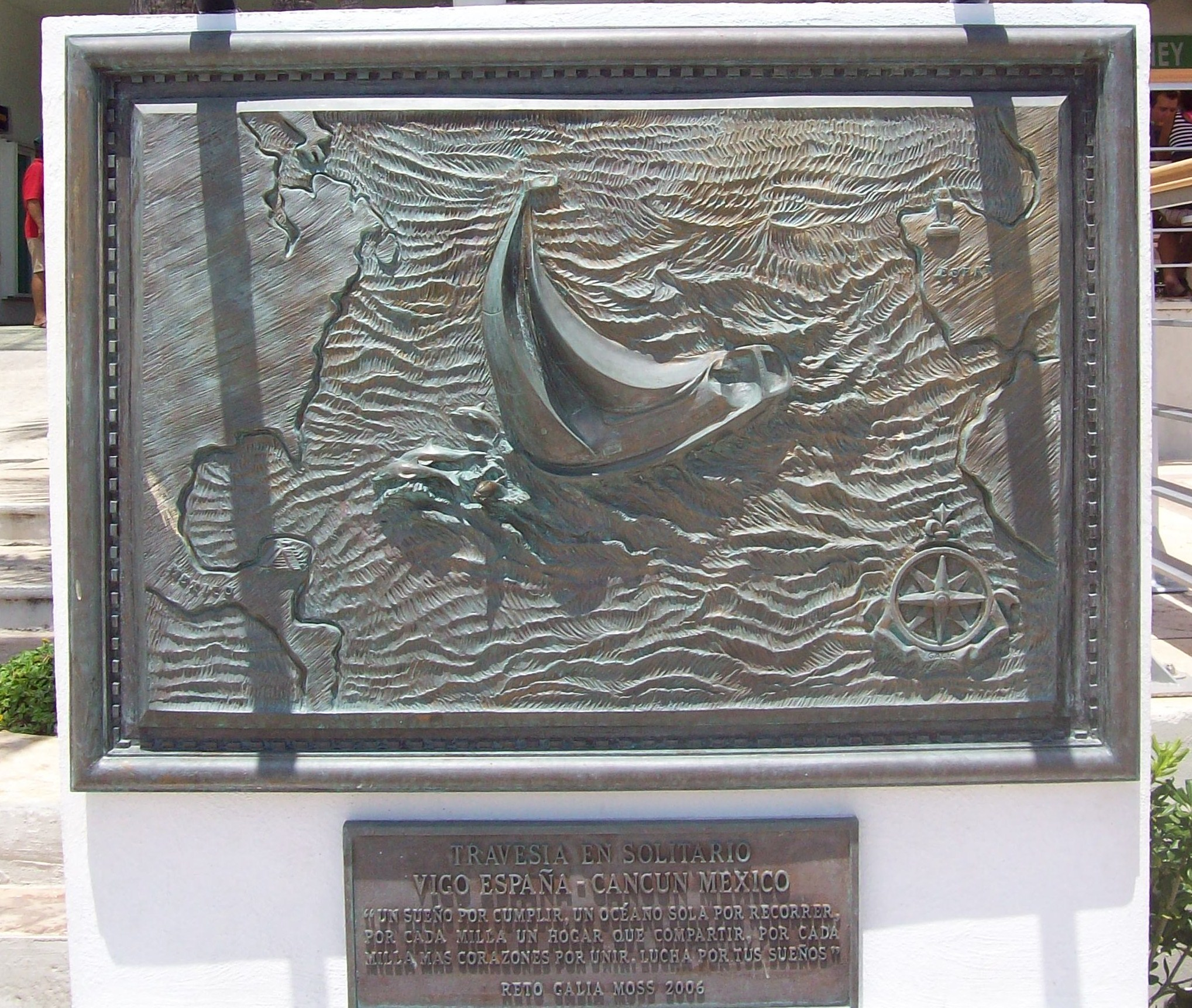
Memorial plaque to Galia Moss' travel in Puerto Juárez.

Galia Moss is an adventurer. Born in Mexico, she is the first Latin American sailor to travel across the Atlantic Ocean alone. On that trip, undertaken in 2006, she traveled nine thousand miles from Vigo, Spain, to Cancun, Mexico, in 41 days. This accomplishment got her listed in the Guinness Book of World Records.

In 2010, she tried to sail from Veracruz, Mexico, to Israel, but had to stop in Miami due to hurricanes in the Central Atlantic Ocean. In 2011, she tried again, setting out from Fort Pierce, Florida, but had to stop due to problems with her boat.

She has also organized campaigns to distribute food to poor children and build houses in Mexico.
