= Ludwik Margules =

Mexican theatre and film director

Ludwik Margules Coben
- Born: 15 December 1933; Warsaw, Poland
- Died: 7 March 2006 (aged 72); Mexico City
- Other name: Ludwik Margules
- Occupations: Film, theatre, opera director
- Years active: 1953-2006

Ludwik Margules Coben (December 15, 1933 - March 7, 2006) was a Polish-born Mexican theatre, opera and film director. Being an active member of the Mexican theatre circuit for more than fifty years, Margules taught acting and directing methods in several institutions, eventually founding his own acting academy, the Foro Teatro Contemporáneo (Contemporary Theatre Forum) in 1991.

== Biography ==
Margules was born in Warsaw on 15 December 1933 to Jewish parents. From early childhood his parents took him to children's plays, to the opera and to productions intended for adult audiences, and it was there, by his own account, that his love of the theatre began.

Following the German invasion of Poland in September 1939, Margules and his family fled eastward toward the Soviet frontier. In a 1974 interview, he described himself in the third person as the child who fled along the roads of an invaded Poland with the German armies at his heels. The family reached Magnitogorsk in the Soviet Union, spent about a year in the Ural Mountains, and in 1941 was evacuated to Leninabad in Tajikistan, then a Soviet republic, where they remained some five years amid deprivation and hunger. His father was wounded during a workers' strike and returned to Warsaw in 1945; his wife and two sons rejoined him in Poland only some six months later.

Around 90 per cent of Polish Jewry — some three million people out of a prewar community of roughly 3.3 million — was murdered during the Holocaust, one of the highest proportions in Europe. Most of the Polish Jews who survived, like Margules, did so not under German occupation but in the interior of the Soviet Union, having arrived there either in flight or through Soviet deportation. Margules returned to Poland in 1946, at the age of twelve, to a country devastated by the Nazis and subsequently subjugated by the Soviet regime. In an interview given in November 2004 to Revista de la Universidad de México, he described the six years of exile in Russia as having left him with what he called an absence of childhood in any conventional sense, and the experience as the source of a deep scepticism about human beings and their capacity to build any form of social order.

Ludwik Margules Coben directed over 40 operas and plays. One of his most outstanding works was his 1982 production of De la vida de las marionetas, based on Ingmar Bergman's film From the Life of the Marionettes (1980).

Ludwik Margules Coben was considered a major artistic influence and mentor. Mexican film director Alejandro Iñárritu stated, "...I studied theater for three years with Ludwik Margules. And that changed my life."

Ludwik Margules Coben was given Mexico's National Prize for Science and Arts in 2003. A Holocaust survivor, at times Margules was called "an axis of controversy".
