= Graciela Ortiz González =

Mexican politician

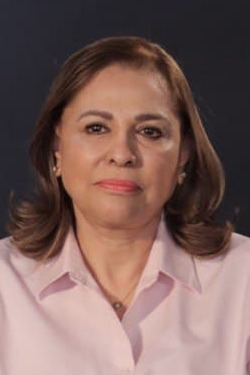
- Born: 29 November 1954 (age 71); Chihuahua, Chihuahua, Mexico
- Occupation: Politician
- Political party: PRI

Graciela Ortiz González (born 29 November 1954) is a Mexican politician affiliated with the Institutional Revolutionary Party (PRI).

She was a deputy in the Congress of Chihuahua from 1992 to 1995. In the 2009 mid-terms she was elected to a plurinominal seat in the federal Chamber of Deputies and, in the 2012 general election, she was elected to the Senate as a national-list senator.

She returned to Congress in the 2024 general election as a plurinominal deputy.
