= Santiago Mexquititlán raid =

2006 copyright raid in Mexico

In March 2006, six plainclothes agents of Mexico's Federal Investigations Agency (AFI) raided a market in Santiago Mexquititlán, Querétaro, in search of unauthorized copies of copyrighted works. The agents later alleged that they were held hostage by vendors during the raid. Three women were convicted of the alleged kidnapping. In September 2009, Jacinta Francisco Marcial and in April 2010 Alberta Alcántara and Teresa González, were released from prison after the charges against them were dropped.

== Allegations of kidnapping ==
During the raid, the six AFI agents were cornered by a number of unarmed vendors in protest. The agents later claimed that the vendors demanded a ransom to let them go. Local witnesses to the incident denied any ransom demand was made.

== Jacinta Francisco Marcial ==
Jacinta Francisco Marcial, an indigenous Otomí woman, sold ice cream in Santiago Mexquititlán's predominantly indigenous tianguis.

The six AFI agents who conducted the raid implicated Francisco Marcial after they were shown a newspaper photograph depicting her walking near a group of protesting vendors. In August 2006, four months after the raid, she was arrested for the alleged kidnapping. She was later convicted and sentenced to twenty-one years' imprisonment.

Amnesty International denounced Francisco Marcial's imprisonment as resulting from a wrongful prosecution. The group declared her a prisoner of conscience, claiming there was no credible evidence against her, and that she had been prosecuted because of her gender, poverty, race, and inability to speak or understand the Spanish language.

In 2009, prosecutors dropped the case against Francisco Marcial. In September 2009, she was released. In April 2010, the Mexican Supreme Court unanimously agreed to reverse the convictions of the two other women convicted of the same charges, Alberta Alcántara and Teresa González, and they were released from prison.
