= 2006 State of Mexico election =

A local election was held in the State of Mexico, Mexico on Sunday, March 12, 2006. About 3.5 million people (40% of the total registered electorate) went to the polls to elect, on the local level:

- 125 municipal presidents (mayors) to serve for a three-year term.
- 75 local deputies (45 by the first-past-the-post system and 30 by proportional representation) to serve for a three-year term in the Congress of the State of México.

In addition to the eight nationally recognized political parties, the State of Mexico has, as of 2006, one locally recognized political party, the Partido Unidos por México (PUM), therefore nine political parties will participate in the Mexico state election.

== Election results ==
Official results can be found at the 2006 elections website.

=== Municipalities ===
| Party/Alliance | Won |
|---|---|
| Alliance for Mexico (PRI–PVEM) | 54 |
| National Action Party (PAN) | 24 |
| Party of the Democratic Revolution (PRD) | 23 |
| Convergence | 3 |
| Labor Party (PT) | 2 |
| Alliance PRD–PT | 9 |
| Alliance PRD–PT–Convergence | 2 |
| Alliance PRD–Convergence | 2 |
| Alliance PT–Convergence | 3 |
| Alliance PAN–PRD | 1 |
| Alliance PAN–PRD–PT | 1 |
| Alliance PAN–PT | 1 |

=== Local Congress ===
Seats won by party (FPP system)
| Party | 2006 results | 2003 results | Change |
|---|---|---|---|
| Alliance for Mexico (PRI–PVEM) | 19 | 24 | -5 |
| PRD–PT | 17 | 10 | +7 |
| National Action Party (PAN) | 9 | 11 | -2 |
