= 2006 Mexico DC-9 drug bust =

Significant police operation against drug trafficking

The 2006 Mexico DC-9 drug bust was a 2006 arrest that resulted in the seizure of 5.5 tons of cocaine in the Mexican city of Ciudad del Carmen. The drugs were smuggled into the country using a McDonnell Douglas DC-9-15. Both plane and drugs were seized by Mexican authorities; according to the United States Drug Enforcement Administration (DEA), it was one of the largest seizures of narcotics in recent Mexican history.

== Drug seizure ==
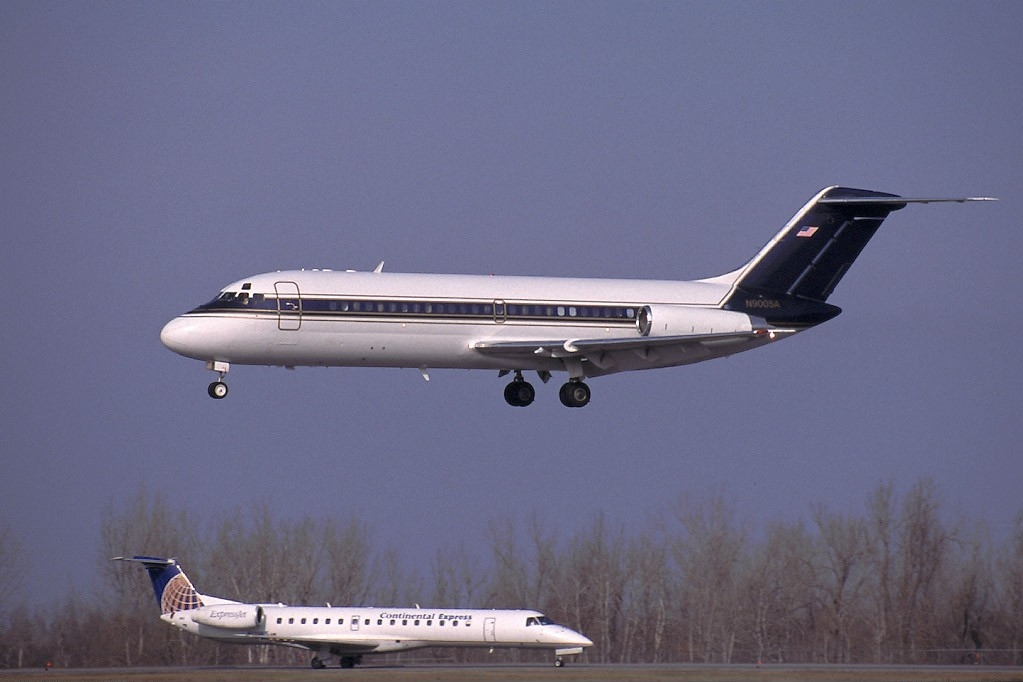
The DC-9-15 involved

The aircraft departed Simón Bolívar International Airport in Caracas, Venezuela on the afternoon of April 10, 2006. Approximately 90 minutes into the flight, it returned to the Caracas airport and refueled before resuming its flight. Rather than continue on its reported flight plan, however, the plane made an emergency landing at the Ciudad del Carmen airport, claiming hydraulic problems with the landing gear. Mexican army troops were waiting for the plane on its arrival. When they boarded the aircraft, they found 5.5 tons of cocaine packed into 128 identical black suitcases.

According to news reports, the pilot of the DC-9, who was in the process of filing a new flight plan and was no longer aboard the plane, escaped, but the co-pilot was arrested. In addition, the crew of a Mexican registered business jet that had also landed at the airport was also arrested after acting suspiciously by paying the exit fees for the DC-9.

In 2007, the DEA claimed the seizure was one of Mexico's largest, referring to it as one of the highlights of a DEA program called "Operation All Inclusive".
