= Layda Sansores =

Mexican politician

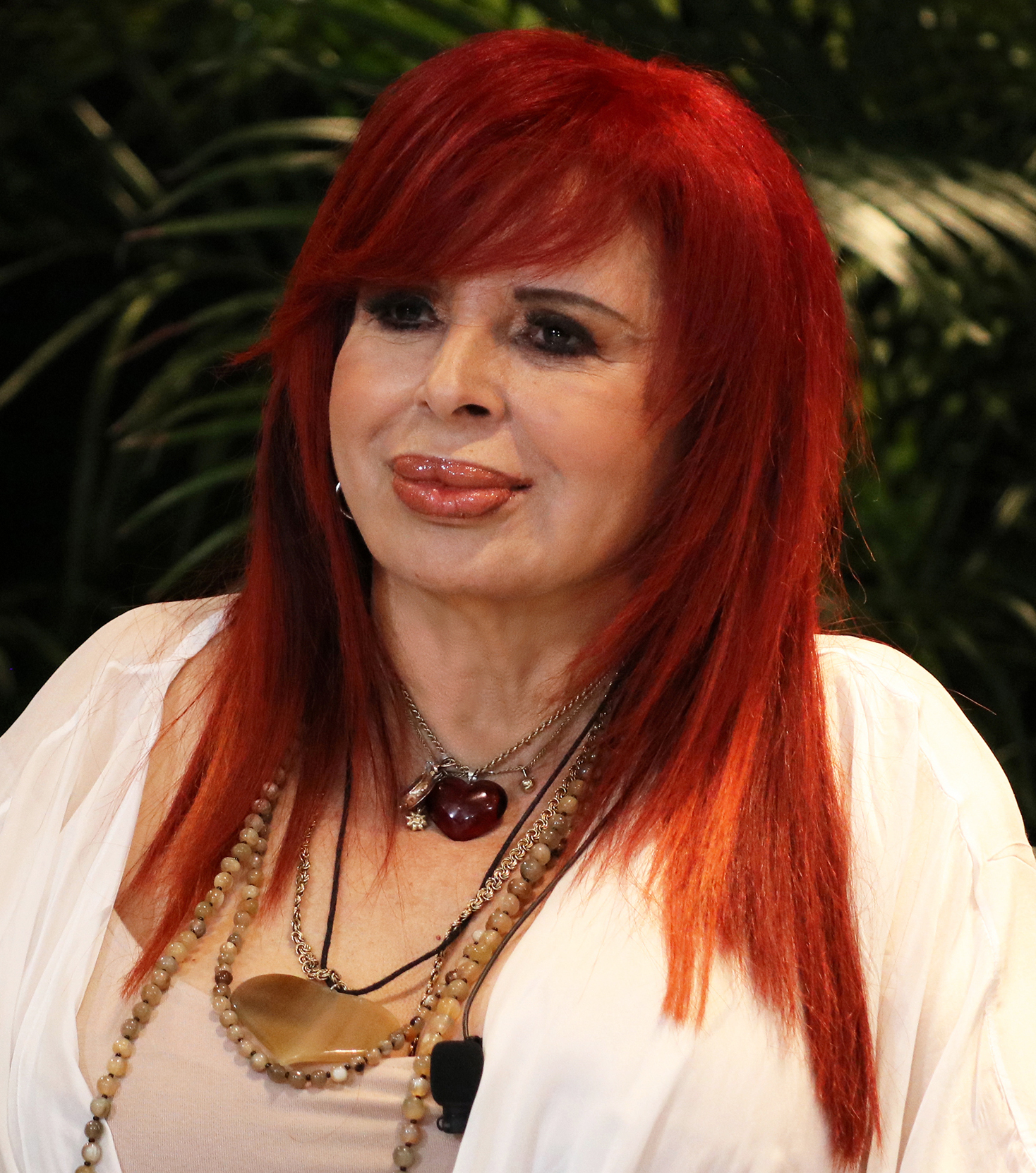
- Sansores in 2022

Governor of Campeche
- Incumbent
- Assumed office 15 September 2021
- Preceded by: Carlos Miguel Aysa González

Personal details
- Born: Layda Elena Sansores San Román; 7 August 1945 (age 81) Campeche, Campeche, Mexico
- Party: National Regeneration Movement (2014–present)
- Other political affiliations: Labor Party (2014); Citizens' Movement (2011-2014); Convergence (2001-2011); Party of the Democratic Revolution (1996-2000); Institutional Revolutionary Party (1966-1996)
- Relatives: Carlos Sansores Pérez

Layda Elena Sansores San Román (born 7 August 1945) is a Mexican politician affiliated with the National Regeneration Movement and the Governor of Campeche since 2021. She served as the mayor of Álvaro Obregón, one of the boroughs of Mexico City, from 2018 to 2021. She served as a senator of the LXII Legislature of the Mexican Congress representing Campeche. She also served as senator during the LVI and LVII legislatures and as deputy of the Chamber of Deputies during the LV and LX legislatures.
