= 2006 Colima state election =

A local election was scheduled to be held in the Mexican state of Colima on Sunday, July 2, 2006. Voters will go to the polls to elect, on the local level:

- 10 municipal presidents (mayors) to serve for a three-year term.
- 25 local deputies (16 by the first-past-the-post system and 9 by proportional representation to serve for a three-year term in the Congress of Colima.
