= 2006 Sonora state election =

Mexican local election

A local election was held in the Mexican State of Sonora on Sunday, July 2, 2006. Voters went to the polls to elect, on the local level:

- 72 municipal presidents (mayors) to serve for a three-year term.
- 33 Deputies (21 by the first-past-the-post system and 12 by proportional representation) to serve for a three-year term in the Congress of Sonora.
