= Julien Félix =

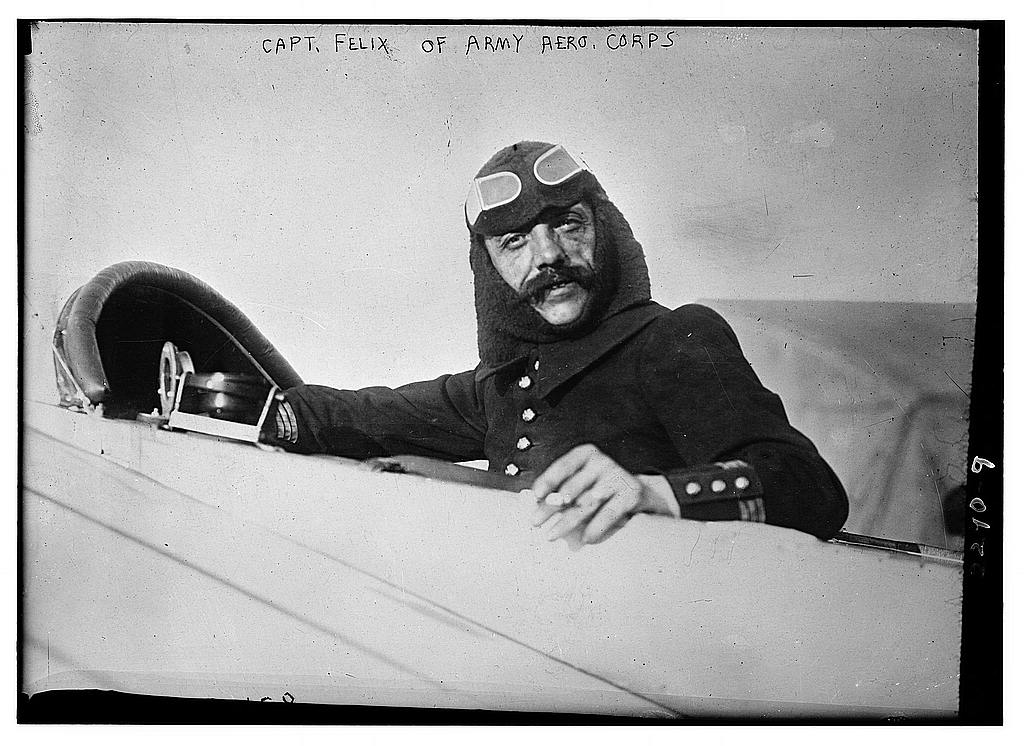
Julien Félix, c. 1910-1914

Major Julien-Alexandre Félix (March 2, 1869 in Limoges - June 17, 1914 in Chartres) was the director of manoeuvres in the French Military Aviation School, École militaire de Pau. He set the altitude record on August 5, 1911 in Étampes in France by climbing to 11,330 feet in 63 minutes, breaking the record of Georges Legagneux.

Félix died while testing a 1912 Drzewiecki Canard monoplane built by Stefan Drzewiecki.
