= Governor of Campeche =

Governor of Mexican state of Campeche

- Gobernador de Campeche

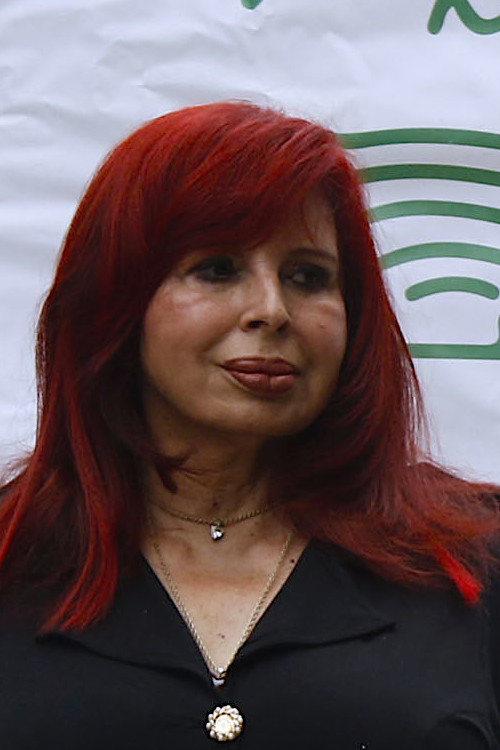
- Incumbent; Layda Sansores since September 15, 2021
- Member of: CONAGO
- Term length: 6 years, non-renewable
- Inaugural holder: Pablo García Montilla

The governor of Campeche, officially Constitutional Governor of the Free and Sovereign State of Campeche (Spanish: Gobernador Constitucional del Estado de Campeche), is in charge the Executive branch of the State Government of the Mexican state of Campeche.

== Term ==
Governors are elected to serve for 6 years and they can not hold the title under any circumstance ever again. The governor takes office on the 15th day of September of the same electoral year and ends on September 14 six years after.

== List of governors ==
According to the historical records of the State, the following is the list of individuals who have held the office of governor since statehood:

== Nineteenth century ==
No.	Portrait	Name	Governorship	Term of office			Political party	Notes
No.	Portrait	Name	Governorship	Took office	Left office	Time in office	Political party	Notes
1		Pablo García Montilla	Constitutional	26 March 1862	21 January 1864	1 year, 301 days		
1		Pablo García Montilla	Constitutional	15 December 1867	1 June 1870	2 years, 169 days		
2		Tomás Anzar Barbachano	Provisional	2 June 1870	19 July 1870	47 days		
3		Salvador Dondé	Interim	19 Julio 1870	5 January 1871	171 days		
4		Joaquín Baranda Quijano	Constitutional (Extraordinary election)	6 January 1871	15 September 1871	253 days		
4		Joaquín Baranda Quijano	Constitutional	16 September 1871	15 September 1875	4 years, 0 days		
4		Joaquín Baranda Quijano	Constitutional	16 September 1875	4 January 1877	1 year, 111 days		
Elected under the Porfiriato
5		Juan B. Zamudio	Interim	5 January 1877	28 April 1877	114 days		
6		Marcelino Castilla	Constitutional (Extraordinary election)	29 April 1877	15 September 1879	2 years, 140 days		
6		Marcelino Castilla	Constitutional	16 September 1879	18 October 1880	1 year, 32 days		
-		Prudencio Pérez Rosado	Interim	18 October 1880	30 November 1880	44 days		President of the State Superior Court of Justice
7		Arturo Shiels	Constitutional (Extraordinary election)	1 December 1880	15 September 1883	3 years, 15 days		
-		Joaquín Baranda Quijano	Constitutional	16 September 1883	15 November 1883	61 days		
8		Juan Montalvo Baranda	Constitutional (Extraordinary election)	16 November 1883	15 September 1887	3 years, 304 days		
9		Juan Trinidad Ferrer	Constitutional	16 September 1887	24 April 1888	222 days		
10		Onecíforo Durán	Interim	25 April 1888	15 September 1888	144 days		
11		Joaquín Z. Kerlegand Flores	Constitutional (Extraordinary election)	16 September 1888	15 September 1891	3 years, 0 days		
12		Leocadio Preve	Constitutional	16 September 1891	15 September 1895	4 years, 0 days		
-		Juan Montalvo Baranda	Constitutional	16 September 1895	19 November 1898	3 years, 64 days		Died in office
13		Carlos Gutiérrez Mac-Gregor	Interim	19 November 1898	15 September de 1899	300 days		
13		Carlos Gutiérrez Mac-Gregor	Constitutional	16 September 1899	2 de April 1902	2 years, 198 days		

== Twentieth century ==
No.	Portrait	Name	Governorship	Term of office			Political party	Notes
No.	Portrait	Name	Governorship	Took office	Left office	Time in office	Political party	Notes
14		José Castellot	Interim	2 April 1902	24 May 1902	53 days		
14		José Castellot	Constitutional	25 May 1902	9 August 1902	76 days		
15		Luis García Mézquita	Interim	9 August 1902	15 September 1903	1 year, 38 days		Died in office
15		Luis García Mézquita	Constitutional	16 September 1903	15 June 1905	1 year, 272 days		Died in office
-		José A. Ruz	Acting Governor	15 June 1905	21 June 1905	6 days		
16		Tomás Aznar y Cano	Interim	21 June 1905	2 September 1905	74 days		
16		Tomás Aznar y Cano	Constitutional (Extraordinary election)	3 September 1905	15 September 1907	2 years, 13 days		
16		Tomás Aznar y Cano	Constitutional	16 September 1907	9 August 1910	2 years, 327 days		
17		José García Gual	Interim	9 August 1910	25 May 1911	289 days		
Elected during the Mexican Revolution
18		Gustavo Suzarte Campos	Interim	25 May 1911	15 June 1911	21 days		
19		Román Sabas Flores	Interim	16 June 1911	27 June 1911	5 days		
20		Urbano Espinoza	Interim	27 June 1911	15 September 1911	81 days		
21		Manuel Castilla Brito	Constitutional	16 September 1911	11 June 1913	1 year, 361 days		
-		Felipe Bueno Castilla	Provisional	12 June 1913	30 June 1913	19 days		President of the State Superior Court of Justice
22		Manuel Rojas Moreno	Interim	1 July 1913	3 July 1913	3 days		
23		Manuel Rivera	Interim	4 July 1913	14 February 1914	226 days		
23		Manuel Rivera	Constitutional (Extraordinary election)	15 February 1914	4 September 1914	202 days		
24		Eduardo Hurtado Aubry	Interim	5 September 1914	9 September 1914	5 days		
25		Joaquín Mucel Acereto	Provisional	10 September 1914	23 June 1917	2 years, 287 days		
25		Joaquín Mucel Acereto	Constitutional (Extraordinary election)	24 June 1917	15 September 1919	2 years, 84 days		
26		Enrique Arias Solís	Constitutional	16 September 1919	15 May 1920	243 days		
-		Eduardo Arceo Zumárraga	Provisional	16 May 1920	25 July 1920	71 days		
Elected under the post-revolutionary period
-		Gonzalo Sales Guerrero	Substitute	26 July 1920	3 January 1921	161 days		
-		Eduardo Arceo Zumárraga	Provisional	4 January 1921	16 February 1921	44 days		
27		Enrique Gómez Briceño	Constitutional (Extraordinary election)	17 February 1921	11 August 1921	175 days		
-		Guillermo Ferrer Vega	Provisional	11 August 1921	24 November 1921	106 days		
28		Ramón Félix Flores	Constitutional (Extraordinary election)	25 November 1921	15 September 1923	1 year, 295 days	Partido Socialista Agrario de Campeche (PSAC)	
29		Ángel Castillo Lanz	Constitutional	16 September 1923	15 September 1927	4 years, 0 days	PSAC	
30		Silvestre Pavón Silva	Constitutional	16 September 1927	19 November 1928	1 year, 65 days		
31		Pedro Tello Andureza	Interim	20 November 1928	28 November 1928	8 days		
32		Ramiro Bojórquez Castillo	Interim	28 November 1928	28 December 1928	30 days	National Revolutionary Party (PNR)	
32		Ramiro Bojórquez Castillo	Substitute	28 December 1928	31 May 1931	2 years, 154 days	National Revolutionary Party (PNR)	
33		Fausto Bojórquez Castillo	Substitute Interim	12 June 1931	15 September 1931	96 days	PNR	
34		Benjamín Romero Esquivel	Constitutional	16 September 1931	15 September 1935	4 years, 0 days	PNR	
35		Eduardo R. Mena Córdova	Constitutional	16 September 1935	15 September 1939	4 years, 0 days	Mexican Revolution Party (PRM)	
36		Héctor Pérez Martínez	Constitutional	16 September 1939	15 September 1943	4 years, 0 days	PRM	
Six-year terms
37		Eduardo J. Lavalle Urbina	Constitutional	16 September 1943	15 September 1949	6 years, 0 days	PRM	
38		Manuel Jesús López Hernández	Constitutional	16 September 1949	15 September 1955	6 years, 0 days	Institutional Revolutionary Party (PRI)	
39		Alberto Trueba Urbina	Constitutional	16 September 1955	15 September 1961	6 years, 0 days	PRI	
40		José Ortiz Ávila	Constitutional	16 September 1961	15 September 1967	6 years, 0 days	PRI	
41		Carlos Sansores Pérez	Constitutional	16 September 1967	2 March 1973	5 years, 168 days	PRI	Left governorship to become a federal deputy
42		Carlos Pérez Cámara	Interim	3 March 1973	13 August 1973	164 days	PRI	
42		Carlos Pérez Cámara	Substitute	14 August 1973	15 September 1973	33 days	PRI	
43		Rafael Rodríguez Barrera	Constitutional	16 September 1973	15 September 1979	6 years, 0 days	PRI	
44		Eugenio Echeverría Castellot	Constitutional	16 September 1979	15 September 1985	6 years, 0 days	PRI	
45		Abelardo Carrillo Zavala	Constitutional	16 September 1985	15 September 1991	6 years, 0 days	PRI	
46		Jorge Salomón Azar García	Constitutional	16 September 1991	15 September 1997	6 years, 0 days	PRI	
47		José Antonio González Curi	Constitutional	16 September 1997	15 September 2003	6 years, 0 days	PRI	

== Twenty-first century ==
No.	Portrait	Name	Governorship	Term of office			Political party	Notes
No.	Portrait	Name	Governorship	Took office	Left office	Time in office	Political party	Notes
48		Jorge Carlos Hurtado Valdez	Constitutional	16 September 2003	15 September 2009	6 years, 0 days	PRI	
49		Fernando Ortega Bernés	Constitutional	16 September 2009	15 September 2015	6 years, 0 days	PRI	
50		Alejandro Moreno Cárdenas	Constitutional	16 September 2015	13 July 2019	3 years, 300 days	PRI	Left governorship to become national president of the PRI
51		Carlos Miguel Aysa González	Interim	13 July 2019	14 September 2021	2 years, 64 days	PRI	
52		Layda Sansores	Constitutional	15 September 2021	Incumbent	4 years, 357 days	Morena	

== See also ==
- Congress of Campeche
- 2019 in Mexico
