= Cumbres case =

Double murder case in Monterrey, Mexico

- Location: Cumbres neighborhood, Monterrey, Nuevo León
- Date: 2 March 2006
- Attack type: Murder; Child abuse
- Deaths: 2 (María Fernanda and Érik Azur)
- Injuries: 2 (Erika Peña and Catalina)
- Perpetrator: Diego Santoy Riveroll

The Cumbres case was a double homicide that occurred on March 2, 2006, in Monterrey, Nuevo León, Mexico. The victims were María Fernanda Santo and Érik Azur Peña Coss, and the case also involved the attempted murder of Érika Peña Coss by her former partner, Diego Santoy Riveroll. The name of the case derives from the Cumbres neighborhood, where the events took place.

== Chronology of events ==
=== The crime ===
In the early morning of March 2, 2006, Diego Santoy secretly entered Erika Peña's home, located at 2909 Monte Casino Street in the Cumbres neighborhood. Once inside, Santoy Riveroll took out a knife and killed little Erik, just seven years old. He then attacked the domestic worker, Catalina Bautista, beating her repeatedly before leaving her gagged in the bathroom. He then murdered María Fernanda, three years old, after strangling her with a cord. Santoy Riveroll went to Erika's room, reproaching her for the end of their relationship, and then proceeded to attack her with a hammer and leave marks with a knife; one of the marks ended up on her neck.

Before leaving the house, Santoy Riveroll took Catalina hostage and left her somewhere in the city center. With the crime already committed, the boy told his brother, mentioning that he was about to flee to southern Mexico and eventually reach Guatemala. However, Diego was unable to reach that country, having been arrested days earlier in the state of Oaxaca and being sent to Monterrey for a possible trial for the incident.

=== Judgment ===
The trial gained notoriety because it involved two young people from influential families in the country. Teresa Coss, the mother of Erika and her deceased siblings, was an astrologer who worked for the television network Multimedios. It was alleged that the Cosses pulled strings to get the network to portray Santoy Riveroll as the sole perpetrator in a relationship that, in reality, was one of mutual violence and toxicity. After arduous months of criminal proceedings, the judge found the young man responsible for the murders, sentencing him to 138 years in prison.

However, Diego denied being the one who murdered Erika's siblings, even stating that it was she who ended their lives because, according to him, Erika hated her siblings and was tired of her mother assigning him the task of caring for them, and he was blamed to wash his hands of the matter. He also stated in several interviews that that morning, as he did in subsequent interviews, he went to Erika's house to have sex, and that while they were in the kitchen, they woke Erik up. This, according to Diego, was what exhausted Erika's patience, and she told him to kill the child with a knife, which he had refused to do. But Erika demanded that he take his brother so she could stab him. Regarding María Fernanda, he stated that she had an "accident" while playing with the cord. This version was not accepted by the judge.

=== Aftermath ===
Santoy Riveroll was sent to the Cadereyta Prison, where he would serve his sentence. Some time later, he met a girl who was part of his "fan club," with whom he fathered a child together. He left his relationship with Erika behind. Due to the emotional impact of witnessing the crime, Erika decided to rebuild her life in Guanajuato City after meeting an American businessman, and married in September 2012.

On February 14, 2020, a judge accepted an appeal for protection filed by Santoy Riveroll's lawyers, ordering the annulment of the sentence and the reinstatement of the confrontations. However, on March 1, 2021, the FGJENL issued the final sentence against Santoy Riveroll, whose sentence was 71 years for double murder, attempted murder of Erika, unlawful deprivation of liberty, and carjacking. Months later, it was also revealed that the home where the incident occurred had been demolished for unknown reasons.

The case went viral on TikTok in late 2023, when one of Santoy Riveroll's former fellow inmates, Axel, said in a podcast that he believed Diego's version of events to the judge that Erika murdered her two brothers and that he was merely a scapegoat. In the podcast, he mentions that Santoy Riveroll was a "simple guy," and he told other prisoners that he and Erika tried to kill each other while high.
