= Autonomous University of Campeche =

Educational institution in Mexico

- Universidad Autónoma de Campeche
- Former names: Universidad del Sudeste (University of the Southeast, 1965)
- Motto: Spanish: Del enigma sin albas a triángulos de luz
- Type: Public university
- Established: 19 October 1989
- Location: Campeche, Campeche, Mexico; 19°49′39″N 90°33′21″W
- Campus: Urban
- Website: uacam.mx

The Autonomous University of Campeche (in Spanish: Universidad Autónoma de Campeche, UACAM) is a Mexican public university based in the city of Campeche, Campeche, that has several campuses across the state. It was founded in 1965 as the Universidad del Sudeste (University of the Southeast).

Its library holds over 18,000 volumes.
