= 2021 national electoral calendar =

National and federal elections held in 2021

- Countries with national elections or referendums: Executive Legislative Executive and Legislative Referendum Executive, Legislative and Referendum Legislative and Judicial Constitutional Assembly, Executive and Legislative

This national electoral calendar for 2021 lists the national/federal elections held in 2021 in all sovereign states and their dependent territories. By-elections are excluded, though national referendums are included.

== January ==
- 10 January:
  - Kazakhstan, Assembly
  - Kyrgyzstan, President and Referendum
- 14 January: Uganda, President and Parliament
- 24 January: Portugal, President

== February ==
- 7 February:
  - Ecuador, President (1st round) and Parliament
  - Liechtenstein, Parliament
- 14 February: Kosovo, Parliament
- 19 February: Turks and Caicos Islands, Legislature
- 21 February:
  - Laos, Parliament
  - Niger, President (2nd round)
- 28 February: El Salvador, Parliament

== March ==
- 2 March: Federated States of Micronesia, Parliament
- 6 March: Ivory Coast, National Assembly
- 7 March: Switzerland, Referendums
- 14 March: Central African Republic, Parliament (2nd round)
- 15–17 March: Netherlands, House of Representatives
- 17 March: Saint Helena, Referendum
- 19 March: Curaçao, Legislature
- 21 March: Republic of Congo, President
- 23 March: Israel, Parliament

== April ==
- 4 April: Bulgaria, Parliament
- 6 April: Greenland, Parliament
- 9 April:
  - Djibouti, President
  - Samoa, Parliament
- 11 April:
  - Benin, President
  - Chad, President
  - Ecuador, President (2nd round)
  - Kyrgyzstan, Constitutional Referendum
  - Peru, President (1st round) and Parliament
- 14 April: Cayman Islands, Legislature
- 18 April: Cape Verde, Parliament
- 25 April: Albania, Parliament

== May ==
- 15–16 May: Chile, Constituent Assembly
- 23 May: Vietnam, Parliament
- 26 May: Syria, President
- 30 May: Cyprus, Parliament
- 31 May: Somaliland, House of Representatives

== June ==
- 6 June:
  - Mexico, Chamber of Deputies
  - Peru, President (2nd round)
- 9 June: Mongolia, President
- 12 June: Algeria, Parliament
- 13 June: Switzerland, Referendums
- 18 June: Iran, President
- 20 June: Armenia, Parliament
- 21–22 June: Ethiopia, House of Representatives (1st stage)
- 24 June: Gibraltar, Referendum
- 25 June: Aruba, Parliament

== July ==
- 11 July:
  - Bulgaria, Parliament
  - Moldova, Parliament
  - Slovenia, Referendum
- 18 July: São Tomé and Príncipe, President (1st round)
- 26 July: Saint Lucia, House of Assembly

== August ==
- 1 August: Mexico, Referendum
- 12 August: Zambia, President and Parliament

== September ==
- 5 September: São Tomé and Príncipe, President (2nd round)
- 8 September: Morocco, House of Representatives
- 12 September: Macau, Legislature
- 13 September: Norway, Parliament
- 16 September: The Bahamas, House of Assembly
- 17–19 September: Russia, State Duma
- 20 September: Canada, House of Commons
- 23 September: Isle of Man, House of Keys
- 25 September: Iceland, Parliament
- 26 September:
  - Germany, Bundestag
  - San Marino, Referendum
  - Switzerland, Referendums
- 30 September: Ethiopia, House of Representatives (2nd stage)

== October ==
- 2 October: Qatar, Consultative Assembly
- 8–9 October: Czech Republic, Chamber of Deputies
- 10 October: Iraq, Parliament
- 13 October: Saint Helena, Legislative Council
- 17 October: Cape Verde, President
- 24 October: Uzbekistan, President
- 31 October: Japan, House of Representatives and Supreme Court retention elections

== November ==
- 4 November: Falkland Islands, Legislature
- 7 November: Nicaragua, President and Parliament
- 10 November: Pitcairn Islands, Island Council
- 13 November: Nauru, Referendum
- 14 November:
  - Argentina, Chamber of Deputies and Senate
  - Bulgaria, President (1st round) and Parliament
- 18 November: Tonga, Parliament
- 21 November:
  - Bulgaria, President (2nd round)
  - Chile, President (1st round), Chamber of Deputies and Senate
- 28 November:
  - Honduras, President and Parliament
  - Kyrgyzstan, Parliament
  - Switzerland, Referendums

== December ==
- 4 December: The Gambia, President
- 12 December:
  - New Caledonia, Independence Referendum
  - Transnistria, President
- 18 December: Taiwan, Referendum
- 19 December:
  - Chile, President (2nd round)
  - Hong Kong, Legislature

== Indirect elections ==
The following indirect elections of heads of state and the upper houses of bicameral legislatures took place through votes in elected lower houses, unicameral legislatures, or electoral colleges:

- 30 January and 6 February: Gabon, Senate
- 3 March: Pakistan, Senate
- 22 March: Laos, President
- 28 March: Turkmenistan, People's Council
- 1 April: San Marino, Captains Regent
- 3–4 April: Kosovo, President
- 5 April: Vietnam, President
- 24 April and 7 October: India, Council of States
- 2 June: Israel, President
- 29 July – 13 November: Somalia, Senate
- 30–31 August: Estonia, President
- 17 September: San Marino, Captains Regent
- 19 September: Hong Kong, Election Committee
- 26 September: Austria, Federal Council (only Upper Austria seats)
- 5 October: Morocco, House of Councillors
- 20 October: Barbados, President
- 22 October: Fiji, President

== See also ==
- List of elections in 2021
