= President of Mexico =

Head of state and government

President of the United Mexican States
- Presidenta de los Estados Unidos Mexicanos
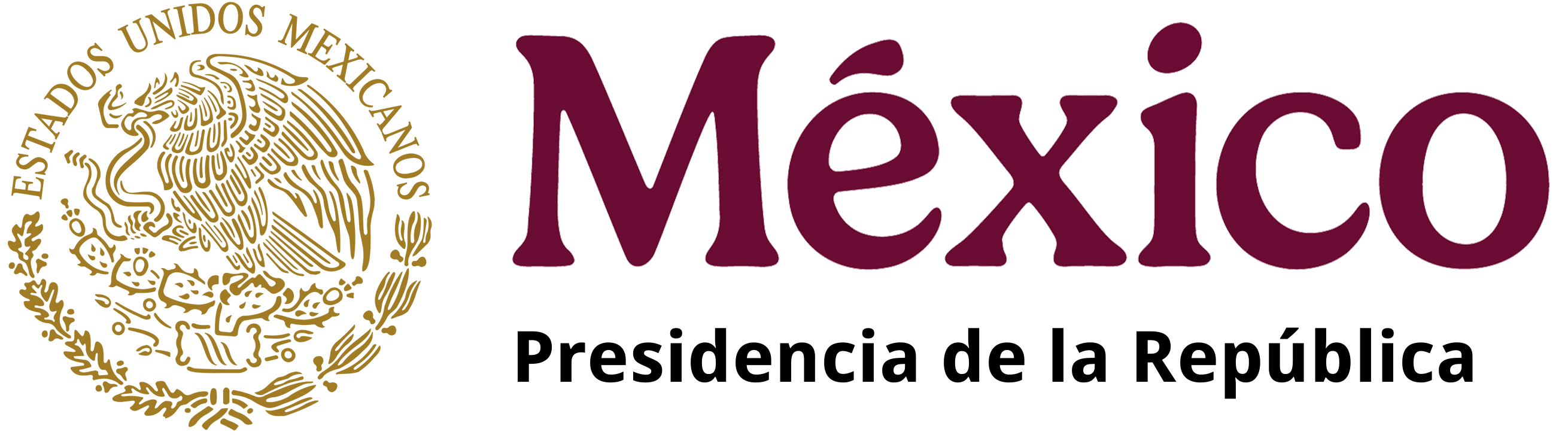
- Logo of the President's Office

- Presidential Standard

- Incumbent; Claudia Sheinbaum since 1 October 2024
- Executive branch of the Federal government of Mexico
- Style: Mr./Madam President (Señor/a Presidente/a) (informal); The Most Excellent (Excelentísimo/a Señor/a) (diplomatic); His/Her Excellency (Su Excelencia) (diplomatic)
- Type: Head of state Head of government Commander-in-chief
- Residence: National Palace
- Seat: Mexico City
- Appointer: Popular vote
- Term length: Six years; non renewable
- Constituting instrument: Constitution of Mexico (1917)
- Precursor: Emperor of Mexico
- Formation: 10 October 1824; 202 years ago
- First holder: Guadalupe Victoria
- Succession: Line of succession
- Deputy: Secretary of Interior (Note: On a temporary basis for 60 days, after which the Congress names a presidential substitute. The Vice President position was abolished in 1917.)
- Salary: MX$208,570.92 (monthly)
- Website: www.gob.mx/presidencia (in Spanish and English)

The president of Mexico (Spanish: presidente de México), (Note: Presidenta is recommended if the holder of the office is a female, however, the name of the charge is officially presidente as per the Mexican Constitution, and presidente can be used for both men and women.) officially the president of the United Mexican States (Spanish: presidente de los Estados Unidos Mexicanos), is the head of state and head of government of Mexico. Under the Constitution of Mexico, the president heads the executive branch of the federal government and is the commander in chief of the Mexican Armed Forces.

The office, which was first established by the federal Constitution of 1824, is currently held by Claudia Sheinbaum, who was sworn in on October 1, 2024. The office of the president is considered to be revolutionary, in the sense that the powers of office are derived from the Revolutionary Constitution of 1917. Another legacy of the Mexican Revolution is the Constitution's ban on re-election. Mexican presidents are limited to a single six-year term, called a sexenio. No one who has held the post, even on a caretaker basis, is allowed to run or serve again. The constitution and the office of the president closely follow the presidential system of government.

== Requirements to hold office ==
Chapter III of Title III of the Constitution deals with the executive branch of government and sets forth the powers of the president, as well as the qualifications for the office. The president is vested with the "Supreme Executive Power of the Union".

To be eligible to serve as president, Article 82 of the Constitution specifies that the following requirements must be met:

- Be a natural-born citizen of Mexico (mexicano por nacimiento) able to exercise full citizenship rights, with at least one parent who is a natural-born citizen of Mexico.
- Be a resident of Mexico for at least twenty years.
- Be at least thirty-five years of age at the time of the election.
- Be a resident of Mexico for the entire year prior to the election (although absences of 30 days or fewer are explicitly stated not to interrupt residency).
- Not be an official or minister of any church or religious denomination.
- Not be in active military service during the six months prior to the election.
- Not be a secretary of state or under-secretary of state, attorney general, governor of a state, or head of the government of Mexico City, unless "separated from the post" (resigned or been granted permanent leave of absence) at least six months prior to the election.
- Not have been president already, even in a provisional capacity (see Succession below).
- Not to maintain dual or multiple nationalities.

The ban on any sort of presidential re-election dates back to the aftermath of the Porfiriato and the Mexican Revolution, which erupted after Porfirio Díaz's fraudulent victory on his seventh re-election in a row. It is so entrenched in Mexican politics that it has remained in place even as it was relaxed for other offices. In 2014, the constitution was amended to allow city mayors, congresspeople and senators to run for a second consecutive term. Previously, deputies and senators were barred from successive re-election. The president remains barred from even non-consecutive reelection.

The Constitution does not establish formal academic qualifications to serve as president. Most presidents during the 19th and early 20th centuries had careers in one of two fields: the armed forces (typically the army) or the law. President Manuel Ávila Camacho (1940–1946) was the last president to have been a career military officer. Most of his successors have been lawyers; in fact, all the presidents between 1958 and 1988 graduated from law school. Presidents Salinas (1988–1994) and Zedillo (1994–2000) were both trained as economists. Since the democratic transition, presidents have a wider academic background. Although Presidents Calderón (2006–2012) and Peña Nieto (2012–2018) were both lawyers, President Fox (2000–2006) studied business administration, Andrés Manuel López Obrador (2018-2024) studied political sciences and current president Claudia Sheinbaum studied physics.

== Elections ==
The presidential term was set at four years from 1821 to 1904, when President Porfirio Díaz extended it to six years for the first time in Mexico's history, and then again from 1917 to 1928 after a new constitution reversed the change made by Díaz in 1904.

Finally, the presidential term was set at six years in 1928 and has remained unchanged since then. The president is elected by direct, popular, universal suffrage. Whoever wins a simple plurality of the national vote is elected; there is no runoff election.

The former president, Andrés Manuel López Obrador, was elected in 2018 with a modern-era record of 53% of the popular vote in 2018. The previous president, Enrique Peña Nieto won 38% of the popular vote in 2012. Former president Felipe Calderón won with 36.38% of the votes in the 2006 general election, finishing only 0.56% above his nearest rival, Andrés Manuel López Obrador (who contested the official results). In 2000, former president Vicente Fox was elected with a plurality of 43% of the popular vote, Ernesto Zedillo won 48.7% of the vote in 1994, and his predecessor Carlos Salinas won with a majority of 50.4% in the 1988 election.

After the fall of dictator Porfirio Díaz in 1910 following the Mexican Revolution, the government was unstable until 1929, when all the revolutionary leaders united in one political party: the National Revolutionary Party, which later changed its name to the Party of the Mexican Revolution and is now the Institutional Revolutionary Party. From then, the PRI ruled Mexico as a virtual one-party state until 1989, when Ernesto Ruffo Appel was elected the first state governor from an opposition party.

Toward the end of their term, the incumbent president, in consultation with party leaders, selected the PRI's candidate in the next election in a procedure known as el dedazo (transl. appointed by the finger). Until 1988, the PRI's candidate was virtually assured of election, winning by margins well over 70 percent of the vote.

In 1988, the PRI ruptured and the dissidents formed the National Democratic Front with rival center-left parties (now the PRD). Discontent with the PRI, and the popularity of the Front's candidate Cuauhtémoc Cárdenas led to worries that PRI candidate Carlos Salinas de Gortari would not come close to a majority, and might actually be defeated. While the votes were being counted, the tabulation system mysteriously shut down. The government declared Salinas the winner, leading to allegations of electoral fraud.

The 1997 federal congressional election saw the first opposition Chamber of Deputies ever, and the 2000 elections saw Vicente Fox of a PAN/PVEM alliance become the first opposition candidate to win an election since 1911. This historical defeat was accepted on election night by the PRI in the voice of President Zedillo; while this calmed fears of violence, it also fueled questions about the role of the president in the electoral process and to whom the responsibility of conceding defeat should fall in a democratic election.

=== President-elect ===
After a presidential election, political parties may issue challenges to the election. These challenges are heard by the Electoral Tribunal of the Federal Judicial Power; after it has heard and ruled on them, the tribunal must either declare the election invalid or certify the results of the elections in accordance to their rulings. Once the tribunal declares the election valid, it issues a Constancia de Mayoría (English: Certificate of Plurality, lit. 'Certificate of Majority') to the candidate who obtained a plurality. That candidate then becomes president-elect. The final decision is made in September, two months after the election.

== Powers ==
The 1917 Constitution borrowed heavily from the Constitution of the United States, providing for a clear separation of powers while giving the president wider powers than their American counterpart.

For the first 71 years after the enactment of the 1917 Constitution, the president exercised nearly absolute control over the country. Much of this power came from the de facto monopoly status of the PRI. As mentioned above, they effectively chose their successor as president by personally nominating the PRI's candidate in the next election. In addition, the unwritten rules of the PRI allowed them to designate party officials and candidates all the way down to the local level. They thus had an important (but not exclusive) influence over the political life of the country (part of their power had to be shared with unions and other groups, but as an individual, they had no peers). This and their constitutional powers made some political commentators describe the president as a six-year dictator, and to call this system an "imperial presidency". The situation remained largely unchanged until the early 1980s when a grave economic crisis created discomfort both in the population and inside the party, and the president's power was no longer absolute but still impressive.

An important characteristic of this system is that the new president was effectively chosen by the old one (since the PRI candidate was assured of election) but once they assumed power, the old one lost all power and influence ("no reelection" is a cornerstone of Mexican politics). In fact, tradition called for the incumbent president to fade into the background during the campaign to elect their successor. This renewed command helped maintain party discipline and avoided the stagnation associated with a single person holding power for decades, prompting Peruvian novelist Mario Vargas Llosa to call Mexico's political system "the perfect dictatorship" since the president's powers were cloaked by democratic practice.

With the democratic reforms of recent years and fairer elections, the president's powers have been limited in fact as well as in name. Vargas Llosa, during the Fox administration, called this new system "The Imperfect Democracy". The current rights and powers of the president of Mexico are established, limited and enumerated by Article 89 of the Constitution which include the following:

- Promulgate and execute the laws enacted by Congress, providing in the administrative sphere to its exact observance;
- Appoint and remove freely the Secretaries of State, remove the ambassadors, consuls general and senior employees of the Treasury, appoint and remove freely all other employees of the Union whose appointment or removal is not otherwise in the Constitution or in laws;
- Appoint, with Senate approval, ambassadors, consuls general, superior employees of the Treasury and members of collegial bodies of regulation in telecommunications, energy and economic competition;
- Appoint, with the approval of the Senate, the colonels and general and flag officers of the Army, Navy and Air Force;
- Preserve national security, under the terms of the respective law, and have all of the permanent Armed Forces i.e. Army, Navy and Air Force for internal security and external defense of the Federation;
- Having the National Guard to the same duties and responsibilities, in the terms that prevent Section IV of Article 76;
- Declare war on behalf of the United Mexican States with consent from the Congress of the Union;
- Intervene in the appointment of the Attorney General of the Republic and delete it, in terms of the provisions of Article 102, Section A, of this Constitution;
- Conduct foreign policy and conclude international treaties and finish, denounce, suspend, modify, amend, remove reservations and issuing interpretative statements thereon, and submitting to the approval of the Senate. In conducting such a policy, the Chief Executive shall observe the following normative principles: self-determination of peoples; nonintervention; the peaceful settlement of disputes; the prohibition of the threat or use of force in international relations; the legal equality of States; international cooperation for development; respect, protection and promotion of human rights and the struggle for international peace and security;
- Convene Congress into special session, when agreed by the Standing Committee;
- Provide the judiciary the aid they need for the expeditious exercise of its functions;
- Enable all classes of ports, establish maritime and border customs and designate their location;
- Grant, according to law, pardons to criminals convicted of crimes jurisdiction of the federal courts;
- Grant exclusive privileges for a limited time, in accordance with the respective law, to discoverers, inventors or perfectors in any branch of industry;
- When the Senate is not in session, the president of the Republic may make appointments mentioned in sections III, IV and IX, with the approval of the Standing Committee;
- At any time, opt for a coalition government with one or more of the political parties represented in Congress.
- To submit to the Senate, the three candidates for the appointment of judges of the Supreme Court and submit their resignations to the approval of licenses and Senate itself;
- Objecting the appointment of commissioners body that sets the guarantor Article 6. of this Constitution made by the Senate, under the terms established in this Constitution and the law;
- The others expressly conferred by this Constitution.

A decree is a legislative instrument that has an expiration date and that is issued by one of the three branches of government. Congress may issue decrees, and the President may issue decrees as well. They have all the power of laws but cannot be changed by a power that did not issue them. They are very limited in their extent. One such decree is the federal budget, which is issued by Congress. The president's office may suggest a budget, but at the end of the day, it is Congress that decrees how to collect taxes and how to spend them. A Supreme Court ruling on Vicente Fox's veto of the 2004 budget suggests that the president may have the right to veto decrees from Congress.

Since 1997, the Congress has been plural, usually with opposition parties having a majority. Major reforms (tax, energy) have to pass by Congress, and the ruling president usually found their efforts blocked: the PRI's Zedillo by opposing PAN/PRD congressmen, and later the PAN's Fox by the PRI and PRD. The PAN would push the reforms it denied to the PRI and vice versa. This situation, novel in a country where Congress was +90% dominated by the president's party for most of the century, has led to a legal analysis of the president's power. Formerly almost a dictator (because of PRI's party discipline), the current times show the president's power as somewhat limited. In 2004, President Fox threatened to veto the budget approved by Congress, claiming the budget overstepped his authority to lead the country, only to learn no branch of government had the power to veto a decree issued by another branch of government (although a different, non jurisprudence-setting ruling stated he could return the budget with observations).

== Oath of office ==
Upon taking office, the president raises their right arm to shoulder-level and takes the following oath:

Protesto guardar y hacer guardar la Constitución Política de los Estados Unidos Mexicanos y las leyes que de ella emanen, y desempeñar leal y patrióticamente el cargo de Presidente de la República que el pueblo me ha conferido, mirando en todo por el bien y prosperidad de la Unión; y si así no lo hiciere que la Nación me lo demande.

Translation:

I affirm that I will follow and uphold the Political Constitution of the United Mexican States and the laws that emanate from it, and to perform loyally and patriotically the office of President of the Republic which the people have conferred upon me, always procuring the good and prosperity of the Union; and if I fail to do so, may the Nation demand it of me.

Note that Article 83 of the Mexican constitution states that the president begins their term at 00:00 (UTC-06:00) on October 1st, so the president assumes the powers of the office at that time, regardless of when the oath is taken.

== Sash and flag ==
Ensign of the President, for use aboard naval vessels

The Mexican presidential sash has the colors of the Mexican flag in three bands of equal width, with green on top, white in the center, and red on the bottom, worn from right shoulder to left waist; it also includes the National Seal, in gold thread, to be worn chest-high. In November 2018, a reform was made on Article 34 reordering the colors of the sash. A new sash was made putting the colors of the sash back to the previous order that was used from 1924 through 2009. In swearing-in ceremonies, the outgoing president turns in the sash to the current president of the Chamber of Deputies, who in turn gives it to the new president after the latter has sworn the oath of office. The sash is the symbol of the Executive Federal Power, and may only be worn by the current president.

According to Article 35 of the Law on the National Arms, Flag, and Anthem, the president must wear the sash at the swearing-in ceremony, when they make their annual State of the Union report to Congress, during the commemoration of the Grito de Dolores on 15 September of each year, and when they receive the diplomatic credentials of accredited foreign ambassadors and ministers. They are also expected to wear it "in those official ceremonies of greatest solemnity". The sash is worn from right shoulder to left hip, and should be worn underneath the coat. The only exception is during the swearing-in ceremony, when it is worn over the coat so that the out-going president may easily take the sash off and drape it over the incoming president (Article 36).

In addition to the presidential sash, each president receives a presidential flag; the flag has imprinted the words Estados Unidos Mexicanos in golden letters and the national coat of arms also in gold.

== Incumbency ==
=== Term limit ===
A foundational principle of the modern Mexican state is the strict limitation on the president's term, a concept known as the sexenio. As defined in Article 83 of the Constitution, the president of Mexico serves a single six-year term and is constitutionally barred from ever holding the office again. The text explicitly states that a citizen who has held the presidency, whether by popular election or by serving as an interim or substitute president, "in no case and for no reason may once again occupy that post."

This absolute ban on re-election, encapsulated in the revolutionary slogan "Sufragio Efectivo, No Reelección" (lit. 'Effective Suffrage, No Re-election'), is a direct response to the 35-year rule of General Porfirio Díaz, which was a primary catalyst for the Mexican Revolution. The 1917 Constitution enshrined this principle to prevent the consolidation of power and the rise of a new dictatorship.

=== Vacancies and succession ===
Under Article 84 of the Constitution, the secretary of the interior assumes the executive power on a provisional basis in the event of the "absolute absence" of the President, such as from death, resignation, or removal.

Congress must then convene to manage the vacancy. If the absence occurs within the first two years of the term, Congress must appoint an interim president and then call for new popular elections to choose a president to complete the remainder of the six-year term. However, if the absence occurs within the last four years of the term, the Congress will appoint a substitute president to serve out the rest of the term, and no new public election is held. If, at the start of a new term, the president-elect is not present, if the election had not been held, or if the election was annulled, the president of the Senate will provisionally assume the executive power. Congress must then convene to appoint an interim president, who is then obligated to call for new presidential elections.

The post-revolutionary succession provisions have come into play twice. In 1928, after the assassination of president-elect Álvaro Obregón, Congress appointed Emilio Portes Gil as Interim President; Portes Gil served in the position for 14 months while new elections were called. Pascual Ortiz Rubio was elected president in the special elections that followed in 1929, but he resigned in 1932. Abelardo L. Rodríguez was then appointed President to fill out the remainder of Ortiz Rubio's term.

=== Removal ===
==== Recall referendum ====
Article 35 of the Constitution provides a mechanism for direct democratic removal known as a "Revocación de Mandato" (lit. 'Revocation of Mandate'). This process allows citizens to vote on whether the president should be removed from office due to a "loss of confidence". It was established in 2019.

The referendum can be initiated only once per term and not until after the third year of the term has concluded. To trigger the referendum, proponents must collect signatures from at least 3% of the nation's registered voters, and these signatures must also represent at least 3% of the voter list in at least 17 different states. For the result to be legally binding and force the president's removal, at least 40% of all registered voters must participate in the election and an absolute majority of the participating voters must vote "Yes" to the recall.

If the recall is successful and the president's mandate is revoked, the vacancy is filled immediately. The process, defined in the Constitution, dictates that the president of the Congress of the Union will provisionally assume the presidency. Congress must then convene within 30 days to appoint a substitute president who will serve out the remainder of the six-year term.

Since the mechanism was introduced, national recall referendums have been held only once: in 2022, when the attempt to recall President Andrés Manuel López Obrador failed to reach the turnout required for a binding result.

=== Compensation ===
The president’s compensation is determined annually in the Budget of Expenditures of the Federation. Under the Federal Law on Remuneration of Public Servants, enacted in 2019, the president’s salary functions as a ceiling for the federal bureaucracy, as no public official may earn more than the President of the Republic.

=== Residence ===
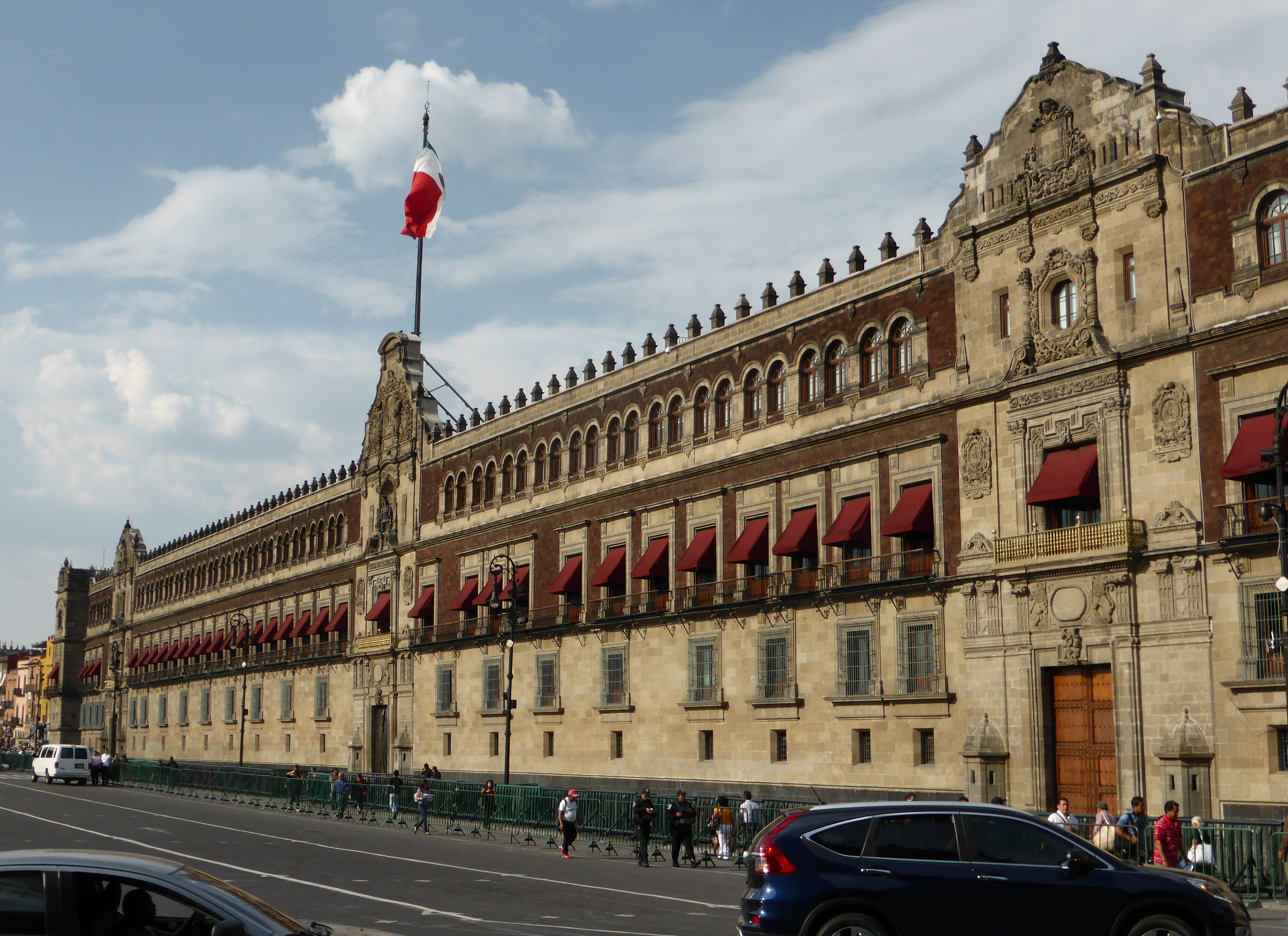
The National Palace, the official residence

The official residence and workplace of the president is the National Palace, located in the Plaza de la Constitución (Zócalo) in Mexico City. A seat of power since the Aztec Empire, the current structure incorporates materials from the former palace of Emperor Moctezuma II. From 1824 to 1884, the National Palace served as both residence and seat of the executive, legislative, and judicial branches. Although it ceased functioning as a residence after 1884, it remained the president’s main office until 1968, and again from 2012 to 2018. In 2019, President Andrés Manuel López Obrador reestablished the National Palace as the official residence by moving into a 300 square meter apartment on the third floor of its south wing, originally built during Felipe Calderón’s administration but never previously used for that purpose.

From 1884 to 1934, Chapultepec Castle functioned as the presidential residence. Restored for this purpose by President Manuel González Flores and officially designated by Porfirio Díaz, the castle had previously been the imperial residence of Emperor Maximilian I during the Second Mexican Empire. While Díaz maintained his office at the National Palace, he and subsequent presidents resided in the castle.

In 1935, President Lázaro Cárdenas moved the official residence to Rancho La Hormiga in Chapultepec, renaming it Los Pinos. He resided in what is now Casa Lázaro Cárdenas, followed by Manuel Ávila Camacho and Miguel Alemán Valdés, who commissioned the larger Casa Miguel Alemán, used as the main residence from 1952 to 2018. The Los Pinos complex expanded to include offices, ceremonial areas, guest quarters, and recreational facilities. Most presidents lived there, though Vicente Fox and Felipe Calderón chose to reside in separate cabins on the grounds while using the main residence as an office.

Former presidential residences

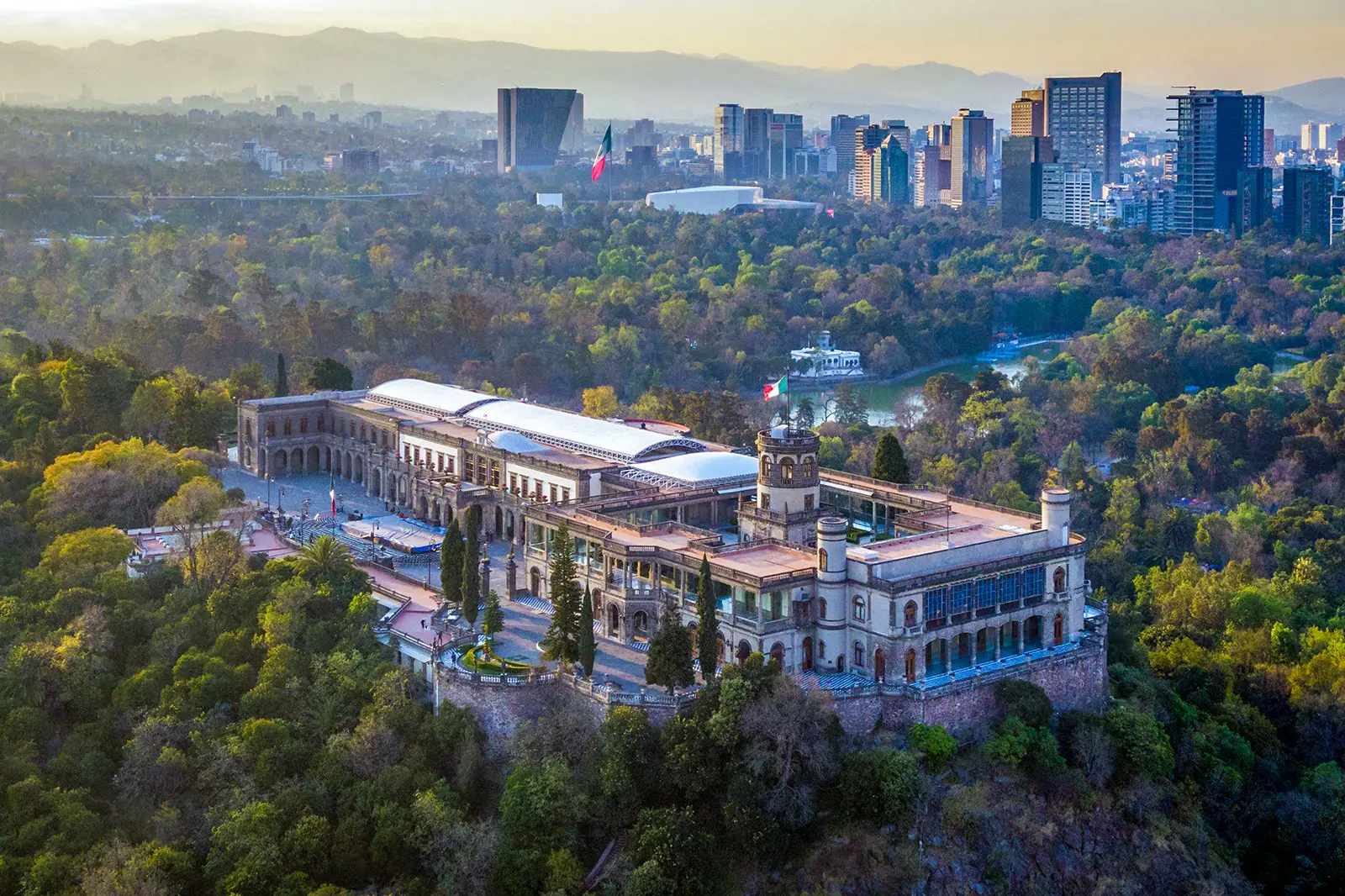
Chapultepec Castle, 1884–1934

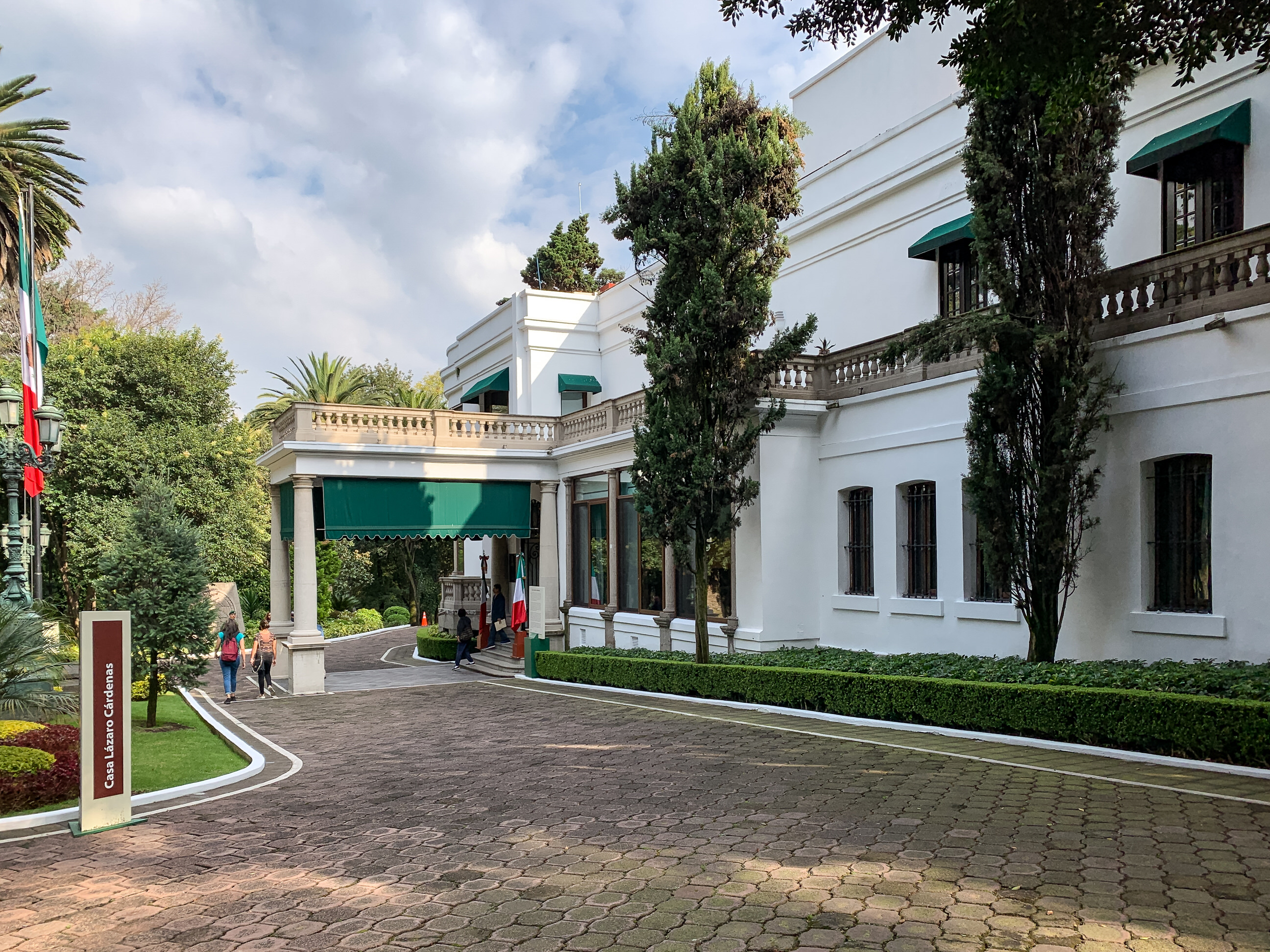
Casa Lázaro Cárdenas, in Los Pinos, 1935–1952

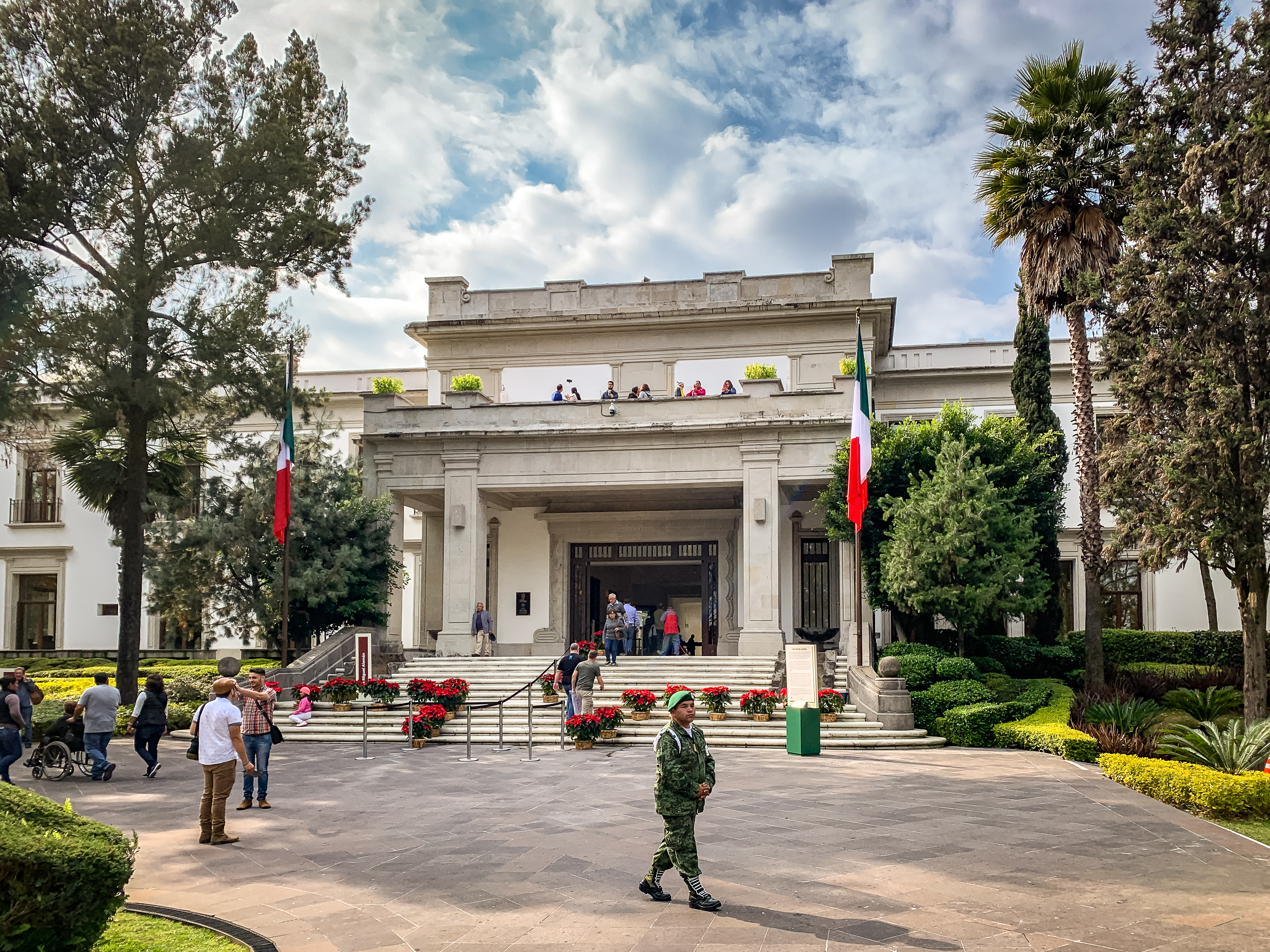
Casa Miguel Alemán, in Los Pinos, 1952–2018

== Post-presidency ==
Former presidents of Mexico continue to carry the title "president" until death but are rarely referred by it; they are commonly called ex-presidents. They were also given protection by the former Estado Mayor Presidencial. Prior to 2018, former presidents also received a lifetime pension, though they could refuse it, as Ernesto Zedillo did. The system was abolished in 2018.

Unlike in some other republics, former presidents of Mexico do not continue to be important national figures once out of office, and usually lead a discreet life. This is partly because they do not want to interfere with the government of the new president and partly because they may not have a good public image. This tradition can be traced back to the presidency of Lázaro Cárdenas. Former president Plutarco Elías Calles had personally selected Cárdenas as his successor, and had hoped to control things from behind the scenes as he had for the previous five years. When Cárdenas showed he would rule in name and fact, Calles publicly criticized him, prompting Cárdenas to have Calles escorted out of the country by military police. Cárdenas himself remained silent on the policies of his successor Manuel Ávila Camacho, establishing a tradition that former presidents do not interfere with their successors.

For example, Ernesto Zedillo holds important offices in the United Nations and in the private sector, but outside of Mexico. It is speculated he lives in a self-imposed exile to avoid the hatred of some of his fellow members of the PRI for having acknowledged the PRI's defeat in the 2000 presidential election. Carlos Salinas de Gortari also lived in a self-imposed exile in Ireland, but returned to Mexico. He campaigned intensely to have his brother, Raúl Salinas, freed after he was jailed in the early days of Zedillo's term, accused of drug trafficking and planning the assassination of José Francisco Ruiz Massieu. Carlos Salinas also wrote a book on neo-liberal Mexico, secured a position with the Dow Jones Company in the United States, and worked as a professor at several universities in that country. Ernesto Zedillo and Felipe Calderón two surviving former presidents lived in the United States and taught at the universities where they formerly studied: Zedillo at Yale University and Calderón at Harvard Kennedy School.

Two former presidents, Vicente Fox and Andrés Manuel López Obrador, live in Mexico. As of September 2024, Carlos Salinas de Gortari lived in the United Kingdom and both Felipe Calderón and Enrique Peña Nieto lived in Spain.

== See also ==
- List of heads of state of Mexico
- List of Tenochtitlan rulers
- List of viceroys of New Spain
- Emperor of Mexico
