= List of elections in 2021 =

Many elections occurred in 2021. The National Democratic Institute maintains a calendar of elections around the world.

- 2021 United Nations Security Council election
- 2021 national electoral calendar
- 2021 local electoral calendar

== Africa ==
- 2021 Ugandan general election 14 January 2021
- 2020–21 Central African general election 14 February 2021 (second round)
- 2020–21 Nigerien general election 21 February 2021 (second round)
- 2021 Ivorian parliamentary election 6 March 2021
- 2021 Republic of the Congo presidential election 21 March 2021
- 2021 Djiboutian presidential election 9 April 2021
- 2021 Beninese presidential election 11 April 2021
- 2021 Chadian presidential election 11 April 2021
- 2021 Cape Verdean parliamentary election 18 April 2021
- 2021 Somaliland municipal elections 31 May 2021
- 2021 Somaliland parliamentary election 31 May 2021
- 2021 Algerian parliamentary election 12 June 2021
- 2021 Ethiopian general election 21 June 2021
- 2021 São Toméan presidential election 18 July 2021 and 5 September 2021
- 2021 Zambian general election 12 August 2021
- 2021 Moroccan general election 8 September 2021
- 2021 Cape Verdean presidential election 17 October 2021
- 2021 South African municipal election 1 November 2021
- 2021 Liberian by-elections, 16 November 2021
- 2021 Gambian presidential election 4 December 2021

== Americas ==
=== Canada and Greenland ===
- Canada
  - 2021 Newfoundland and Labrador general election 25 March 2021
  - 2021 Yukon general election 12 April 2021
  - 2021 Nova Scotia general election 17 August 2021
  - 2021 Canadian federal election 20 September 2021
  - 2021 Nunavut general election 25 October 2021
- 2021 Greenlandic general election 6 April 2021

=== The Caribbean, Central America, and Mexico ===
- Tobago
  - January 2021 Tobago House of Assembly election 25 January 2021
  - December 2021 Tobago House of Assembly election 6 December 2021
- 2021 Salvadoran legislative election 28 February 2021
- 2021 Curaçao general election 19 March 2021
- Antigua and Barbuda
  - 2021 Barbuda Council election 29 March 2021
- 2021 Caymanian general election 14 April 2021
- Barbados
  - 2021 Barbadian presidential election 20 October 2021
- Mexico
  - 2021 Mexican legislative election 6 June 2021
  - 2021 Mexican gubernatorial elections 6 June 2021
- 2021 Aruban general election 25 June 2021
- 2021 Saint Lucian general election 26 July 2021
- 2021 Nicaraguan general election 7 November 2021
- 2021 Honduran general election 28 November 2021

=== South America ===
- 2021 Ecuadorian general election 7 February and 11 April
- Chile
  - 2021 Chilean Constitutional Convention election 15–16 May
  - 2021 Chilean general election 21 November
- 2021 Peruvian general election 11 April and 6 June
- Argentina
  - 2021 Argentine legislative election 14 November 2021
  - 2021 Argentine provincial elections
- 2021 Falkland Islands general election 4 November 2021

=== United States ===
- 2020–21 United States Senate election in Georgia
- 2020–21 United States Senate special election in Georgia
- 2021 United States House of Representatives elections
- 2021 United States gubernatorial elections

== Asia ==
- 2021 Armenian parliamentary election 20 June 2021
- 2021 Cypriot legislative election 30 May 2021
- 2021 Italian by-elections, 3-4 October 2021
- 2021 Iraqi parliamentary election 10 October 2021
- 2021 Israeli presidential election 2 June 2021
- 2021 Japanese general election 31 October 2021
- 2021 Kazakh legislative election 10 January 2021
- Kyrgyzstan
  - 2021 Kyrgyz presidential election 10 January 2021
  - 2021 Kyrgyz parliamentary election 28 November 2021
- 2021 Laotian parliamentary election 21 February 2021
- 2021 South Korean by-elections 7 April 2021
- 2021 Vietnamese legislative election 23 May 2021
- 2021 Vietnamese presidential election 26 July 2021
- 2021 Mongolian presidential election 9 June 2021
- 2021 Russian legislative election 17-19 September 2021
- 2021 Uzbek presidential election 24 October 2021
- 2021 Japanese general election 31 October 2021
- 2021 Hong Kong legislative election 19 December 2021
- 2021 Elections in India

== Europe ==
- 2021 Estonian presidential election 30–31 August 2021
- 2021 Portuguese presidential election 24 January 2021
- 2021 Liechtenstein general election 7 February 2021
- Spain
  - 2021 Catalan regional election 14 February 2021
  - 2021 Madrilenian regional election 4 May 2021
- 2021 Kosovan parliamentary election 14 February 2021
- Germany
  - 2021 Baden-Württemberg state election 14 March 2021
  - 2021 Rhineland-Palatinate state election 14 March 2021
  - 2021 Saxony-Anhalt state election 6 June 2021
  - 2021 Mecklenburg-Vorpommern state election 26 September 2021
  - 2021 Berlin state election 26 September 2021
  - 2021 German federal election 26 September 2021
- 2021 Dutch general election 17 March 2021
- Bulgaria
  - April 2021 Bulgarian parliamentary election 4 April 2021
  - July 2021 Bulgarian parliamentary election 11 July 2021
  - 2021 Bulgarian general election 14 November 2021
- 2021 Albanian parliamentary election 25 April 2021
- United Kingdom
  - 2021 London Assembly election 6 May 2021
  - 2021 Senedd (Welsh Parliament) election 6 May 2021
  - 2021 Scottish Parliament election 6 May 2021
- 2021 Cypriot legislative election 30 May 2021
- 2021 Armenian parliamentary election 20 June 2021
- 2021 Moldovan parliamentary election 11 July 2021
- 2021 Montenegrin municipal elections 14 March-9 May and 5 December
- 2021 North Macedonian local elections 17 and 31 October 2021
- 2021 Serbian local elections 28 March and 17 October 2021
- 2021 Norwegian parliamentary election 13 September 2021
- 2021 Russian legislative election 19 September 2021
- 2021 Icelandic parliamentary election 25 September 2021
- Austria
  - 2021 Upper Austrian State election 26 September 2021
- 2021 Czech legislative election 8–9 October 2021

== Middle East ==
- 2021 Israeli legislative election 23 March 2021
- 2021 Syrian presidential election 26 May 2021
- 2021 Iranian presidential election 18 June 2021
- 2021 Qatari general election 2 October 2021
- 2021 Iraqi parliamentary election 10 October 2021

== Oceania ==
- 2021 Micronesian parliamentary election 2 March 2021
- Australia
  - 2021 Western Australian state election 13 March 2021
  - 2021 Tasmanian state election 1 May 2021
- 2021 Samoan general election 9 April 2021
- 2021 Tongan general election 18 November 2021

== See also ==
- 2020s in political history
