= Henn Põlluaas =

Estonian politician (born 1960)

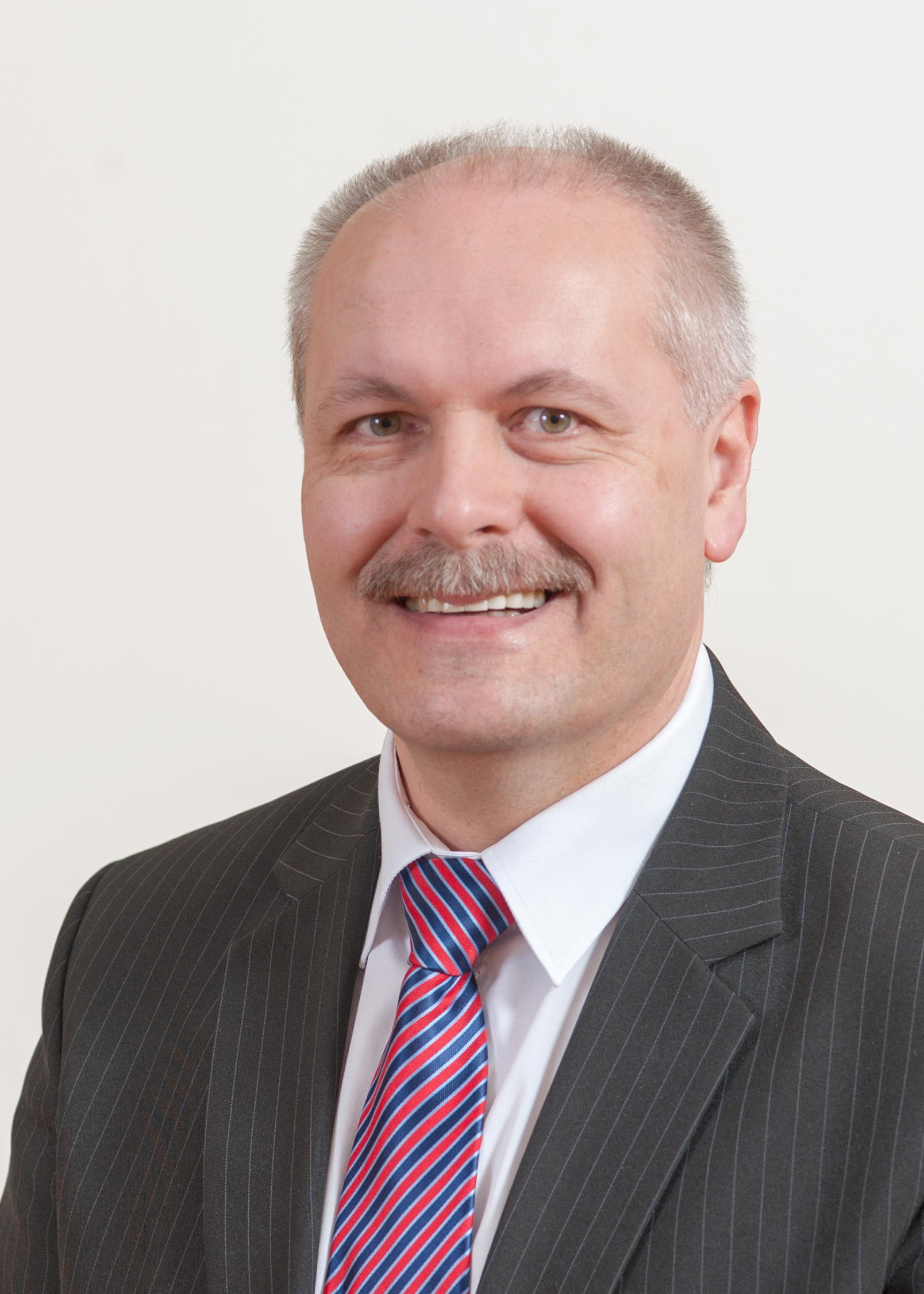
- Põlluaas in 2015

Member of the Riigikogu
- Incumbent
- Assumed office 30 March 2015

President of the Riigikogu
- In office 4 April 2019 – 18 March 2021
- Preceded by: Eiki Nestor
- Succeeded by: Jüri Ratas

Mayor of Saue
- In office 2012–2015
- Preceded by: Harry Pajundi
- Succeeded by: Tõnu Urva

Personal details
- Born: 16 February 1960 (age 66) Tallinn, then part of Estonian SSR, Soviet Union
- Party: Conservative People's Party (2012–2024); Nationalists and Conservatives (2024); Isamaa (January 2025-...)
- Education: Tallinn University

Henn Põlluaas (born 16 February 1960) is an Estonian politician and the President of the Riigikogu since April 2019 to March 2021. He was also the mayor of Saue from 2012 until 2015 when he was elected to the parliament. He has been the vice-chairman of the Conservative People's Party since 2017. In June 2021, Põlluaas was announced as the Conservative People's Party candidate in the 2021 Estonian presidential election.

When he was elected the President of the Riigikogu, he immediately ordered two European Union flags in the main reception hall of the parliament to be removed. After he lost the position in March 2021, the EU flags were restored.
