= 2022 Mexican presidential recall referendum =

Referendum held in Mexico

- 10 April 2022
- Do you agree that Andrés Manuel López Obrador, president of the United Mexican States, should have his mandate revoked due to loss of confidence, or should he remain in the Presidency of the Republic until his term ends?

Results
Choice	Votes	%
Should have mandate revoked	1,063,209	6.55%
Should continue as President	15,159,323	93.45%
Valid votes	16,222,532	98.30%
Invalid or blank votes	280,104	1.70%
Total votes	16,502,636	100.00%
Registered voters/turnout	92,823,216	17.78%
- Results by federal electoral district

A presidential recall referendum was held in Mexico on 10 April 2022 to decide if incumbent president Andrés Manuel López Obrador should stay in office and serve his full six-year term.

The recall had to be approved by an absolute majority of valid votes, and turnout had to be at least 40% for it to be valid. This was the first national recall election in Mexico. It was proposed by López Obrador himself during his candidacy in the 2018 election and requested by opponents and supporters of his government. It was organized by the Instituto Nacional Electoral, triggered by 2.7 million signatures from 17 states representing 3% of the electoral roll, following rules set by the constitution and the Federal Law of Revocation of Mandate.

The INE, which started preparations in August 2021, stated there was a lack of resources for the consultation organization, causing it to challenge the budget approved by the Chamber of Deputies and ask the Supreme Court of Justice of the Nation for their stance. In contrast, the president and other government figures assured that the organization did have the appropriate money. After suspending preparations, the decision for suspension was revoked by the Supreme Court's recess commission and the Federal Electoral Tribunal, which ordered the INE to perform the consultation. With that, on 4 February, the call for consultation was approved, causing the installation of 57,377 polling stations and 1.5 billion Mexican pesos available for the INE, less than half of the initially requested money.

== Background ==
During his presidential campaign, López Obrador promised to hold a recall election two years into his eventual government. Later, in government, on 19 March 2019, he signed a letter that stated ″In 2021, a consultation will be held to ask the citizens if they want me to continue governing or resign″ and rejected that ″the proposition of organizing the recall conceals the intention to reelect me in 2024,″ an accusation made by some opposition figures of the government. In October of the same year, the Mexican Senate approved the recall election in general, with 98 votes in favor, 22 against, and one abstention. For the particular changes in the Constitution relative to the recall election, the Senate voted 90 in favor and 22 against. In November, the Chamber of Deputies also approved it in general, with 372 votes in favor and 75 against. For the particular modifications in the Constitution, the Chamber of Deputies voted 356 in favor and 84 against. In December, once endorsed by 17 state congresses, the decree was published in the Official Journal of the Federation.

Despite being planned for 2021, the constitutional changes stipulated its realization one year later, in 2022. At the start of August 2021, after the corruption trial referendum, López Obrador insisted that he promote the recall election. To this end, later in that month, the leader of the senators for the governing party Morena, Ricardo Monreal Ávila, signaled that he would look for an extraordinary period of the Congress to address the regulation of the recall process with the proposal ″Federal Law of Revocation of Mandate″ and seeking to eliminate the phrase ″because of loss of confidence″ from the proposal. The initial referendum wording proposed was: ″Do you agree that the tenure of the person holding the position of the president of the Republic be terminated early due to loss of confidence?″ Nevertheless, the legislative groups of Morena, the Ecologist Green Party of Mexico (PVEM), and the Labor Party (PT) did not get the necessary votes to convene the special session.

== Opinion polls ==
A person inserting their vote in a ballot box on 10 April 2022

These polls were conducted after the federal law for recall elections and the referendum question were published. Some of these polls asked if the respondents approved of the president, not necessarily their stance on the referendum.

Date	Brand	Sample size	Resign	Continue	Undecided	Margin of error
8-12 March 2022	SIMO Consulting	800	24%	74%	2%	±3.46%
11-13, 18-19, and 25-26 February 2022	El Financiero	1,000	30%	63%	7%	±3.1%
21 February 2022	Massive Caller	2,000	30.3%	69.7%	—	±2.2%
13-14 February 2022	TResearch	1,000	36.4%	60.5%	3.0%	Unknown
7 February 2022	Massive Caller	1,000	37.0%	59.5%	3.5%	±3.4%
14-15 and 28-30 January 2022	El Financiero	1,000	40%	55%	—	±3.1%
4-6 December 2021	Parametría	800	27%	67%	6%	±3.5%
10-12 and 17-19 December 2021	El Financiero	1,100	33%	63%	—	±3.0%
24-28 November 2021	Reforma	1,000	26%	68%	—	±4.5%
12-13 and 26-28 November 2021	El Financiero	1,000	34%	62%	—	±3.1%
18-23 November 2021	El Universal	Unknown	22%	76%	2%	Unknown
15-16 and 29-31 October 2021	El Financiero	1,002	30%	69%	1%	±3.1%
10-11 and 24-28 September 2021	El Financiero	900	31%	66%	3%	±3.3%
