= Tarmo Soomere =

Estonian marine scientist and mathematician

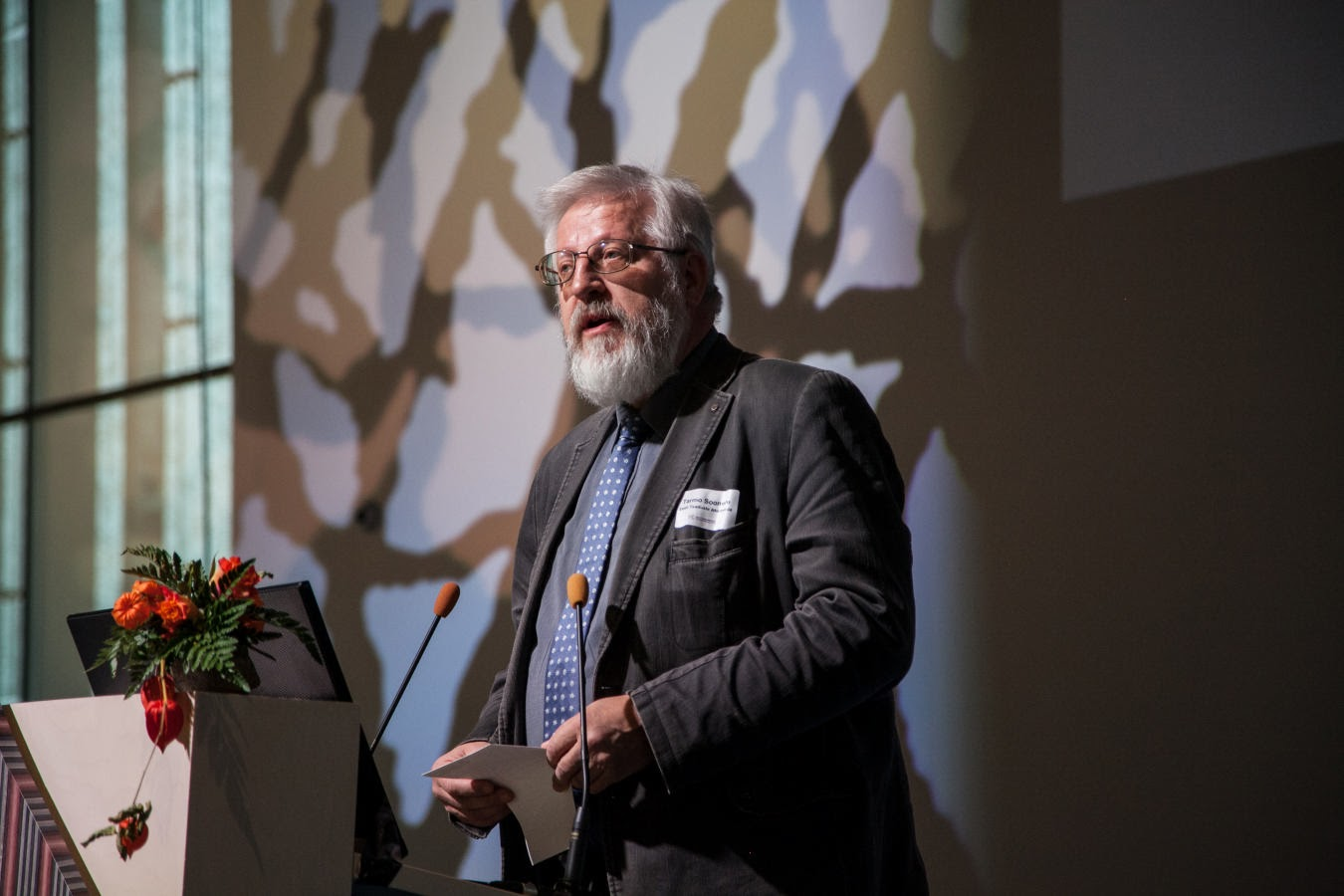
Tarmo Soomere in 2016

Tarmo Soomere (born 11 October 1957 in Tallinn) is an Estonian marine scientist and mathematician. Since 2014, he is the president of Estonian Academy of Sciences. In March 2021 Soomere announced his candidacy for the 2021 Estonian presidential election.

== Awards ==
- 2002 Estonian National Research Award (for engineering sciences)
- 2005 People of the Year (for newspaper Postimees)
- 2007 Baltic Assembly Prize for Literature, the Arts and Science
