= Estonia Piano Factory =

Company based in Estonia

Coordinates: 59°26′53.27″N 24°43′48.46″E

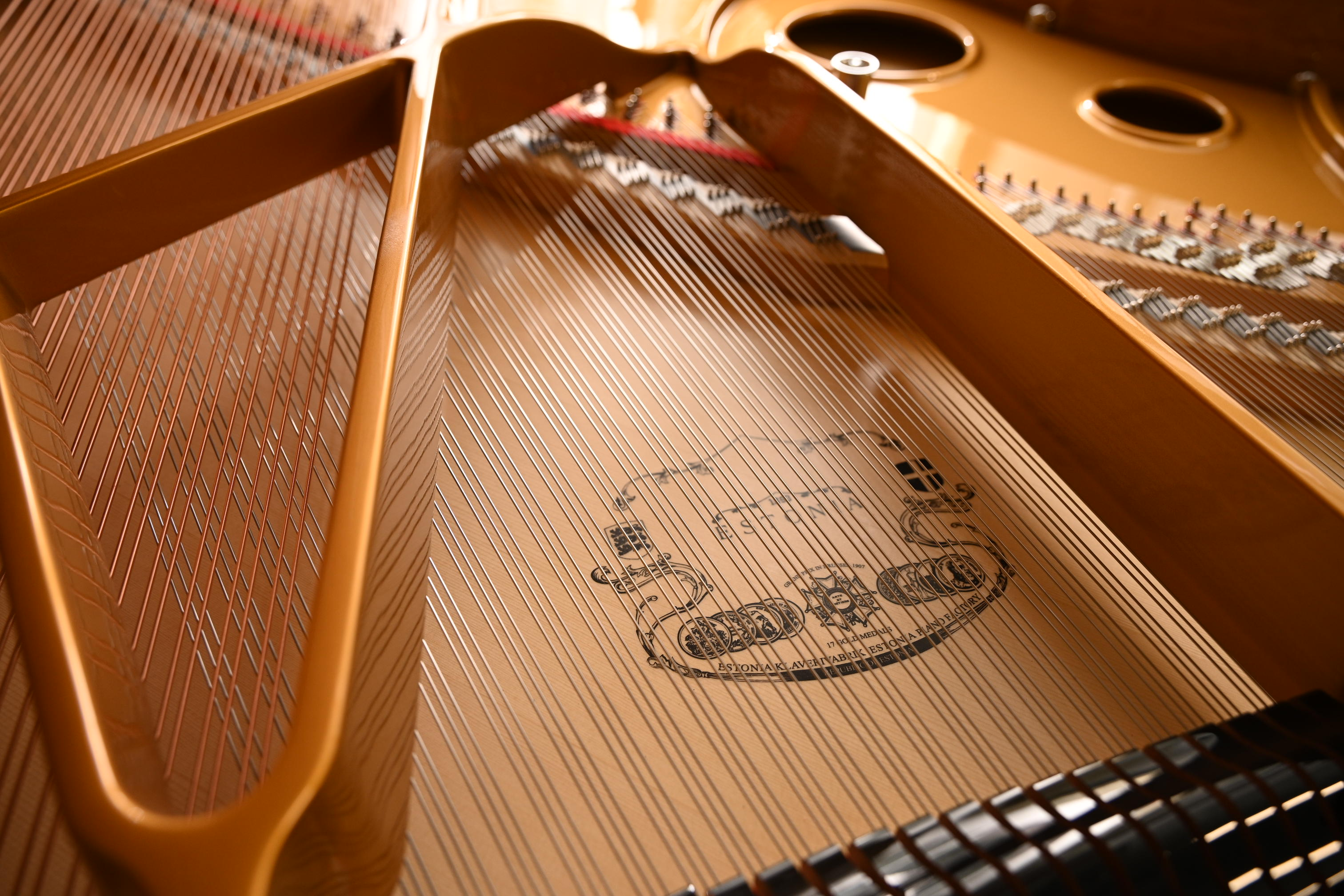
Logo on soundboard

Estonia Piano Factory (Estonian: Estonia Klaverivabrik) is a manufacturer of handcrafted grand pianos based in Tallinn.

== History ==
Indrek Laul has been the factory's CEO since 2018, and his wife Triin-Maret Laul has been the Sound Specialist since 2013.

== Characteristics ==
Concert pianist Marc-André Hamelin, after choosing an Estonia piano for himself, commented, "The level of craftsmanship in the Estonia piano can only inspire the highest respect and I have no doubt that this piano will continue to prove essential to sensitive musicians."

== Models ==
Estonia's pianos are performance quality acoustic grand pianos manufactured in the Republic of Estonia. Five models have been available, offered in an ebony polish finish as well as a range of custom finishes.

=== Grand Pianos ===
- Model 168: 168 cm (5 ft 6 in)
- Model 190: 190 cm (6 ft 3 in)
- Model 210: 210 cm (6 ft 11 in)
- Model 225: 225 cm (7 ft 5 in)
- Grand Model 274: 274 cm (9 ft 0 in)
