= 2021 Estonian presidential election =

- 30–31 August 2021

101 members of the Riigikogu 68 votes needed to win
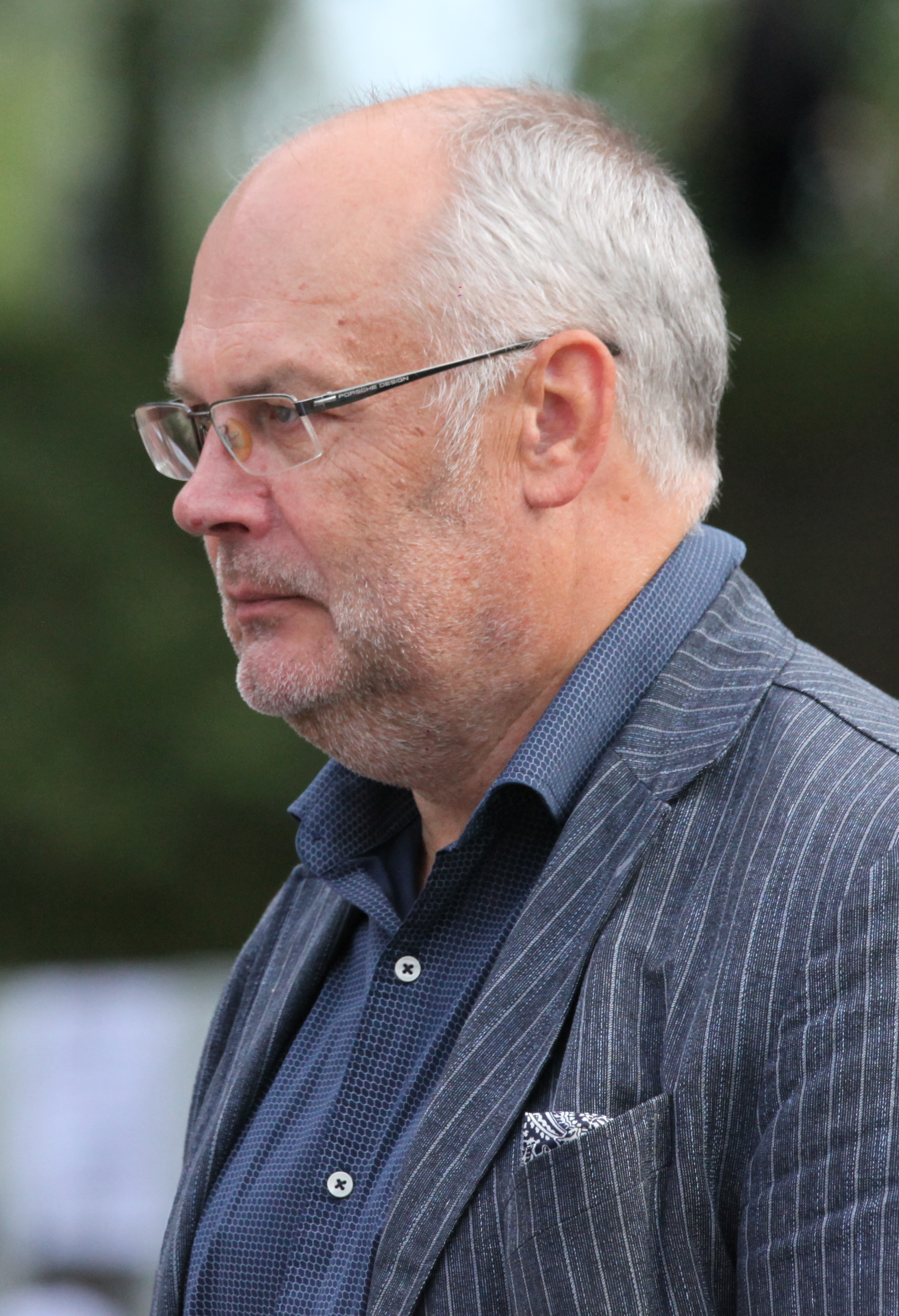
Nominee	Alar Karis
Party	Independent
First round	63
Second round	72
Nominators	Centre, Reform
President before election
Kersti Kaljulaid
Independent
Elected President
Alar Karis
Independent

An indirect election took place in Estonia on 30 and 31 August 2021 to elect the president of Estonia, who is the country's head of state. The Riigikogu — the Parliament of Estonia — elected Alar Karis to serve in the office and he was sworn in as the 6th president on 11 October 2021. The incumbent, Kersti Kaljulaid, was eligible to seek reelection to a second, and final, term but failed to gain the endorsement of at least 21 MPs, which is required in order for a candidate to register, as she was outspoken against some of the policies of the government, who thus denied her support.

The election, being one of an unopposed candidate (a first under the 1992 constitution), caused an outcry as it was compared with those held under the Soviet occupation of the country. Described as "unethical", it reignited previous calls for a reform of the electoral system, including direct election. Referencing the "turmoil that surrounded the presidential selection process" in his post election speech, Karis called for changes of the system to be examined by the Riigikogu, such as using an enlarged electoral college, facilitating the nomination of candidates or even using direct election.

== Process ==
By law, the president of Estonia is indirectly elected. The Riigikogu has the task of electing the president in the first instance. If no candidate receives the required supermajority of two-thirds (68 votes out of 101), the president is selected by an electoral college consisting of MPs and representatives of local (municipal) governments. If the electoral college fails to achieve a supermajority as well, the process is to return to the parliament yet again.

The incumbent Kersti Kaljulaid served one term, and was eligible to be elected to a second consecutive term in office, but did not receive enough parliamentary nominations in order to stand as a candidate. In June 2021, Jüri Ratas announced a special session of the Riigikogu on 30 August, in order to begin the process of electing the president. Members of parliament were allowed to begin nominating candidates on 26 August.

== Candidates ==
Individuals must be nominated by one-fifth of the members of Riigikogu (21 MPs) in order to officially stand as candidates. Members of the Riigikogu may begin officially nominating candidates for the election on 26 August, while the nominations were publicly revealed on 29 August.

=== Nominated ===
The following individual received the mandated amount of nominations from at least 21 MPs.

Candidate
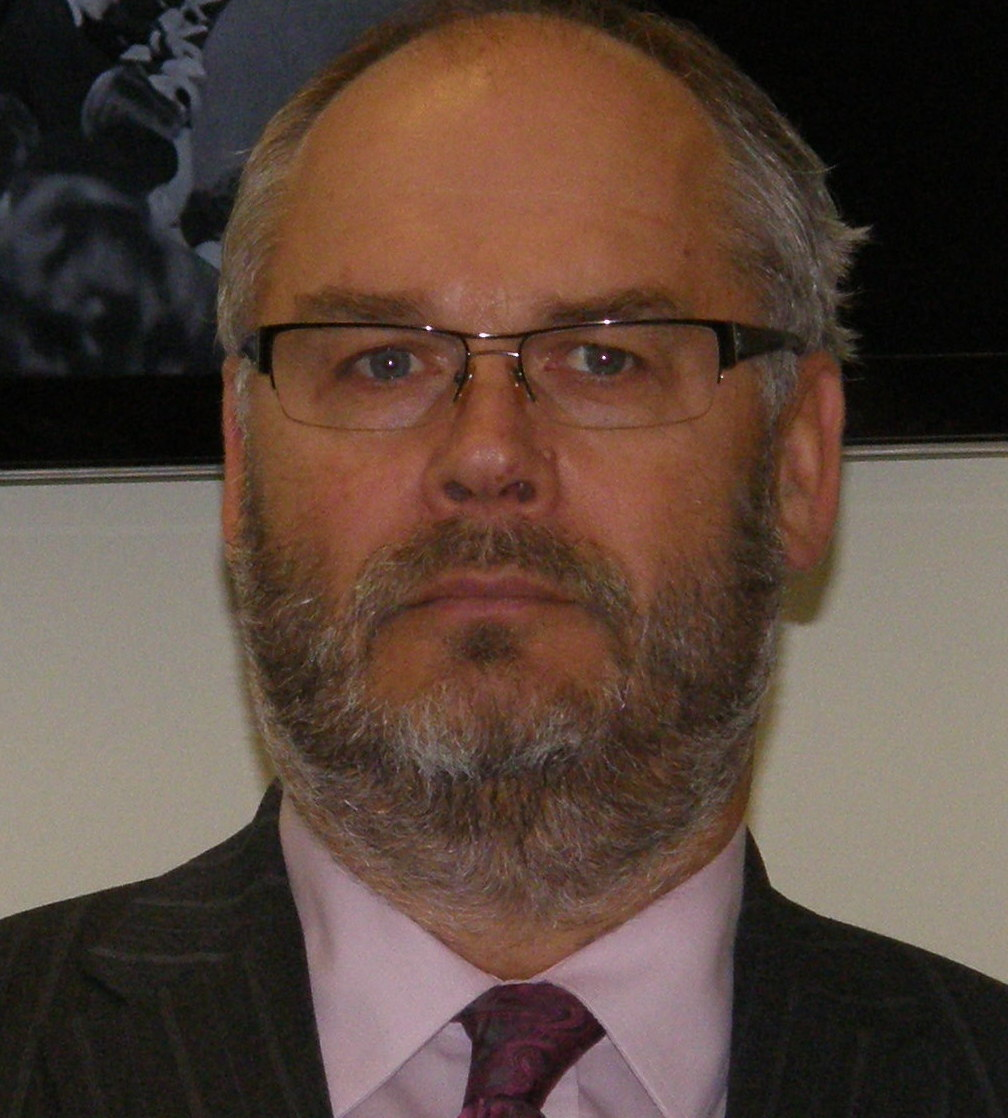
Alar Karis
Centre Party and Reform Party
Director of the Estonian National Museum (2018–2021)

=== Not nominated ===
The following individuals declared their intentions to stand as candidates in the election, but were not nominated by 21 MPs in order to become candidates.

- Kersti Kaljulaid, incumbent president of Estonia (since 2016)
- Kaimar Karu, Minister of Entrepreneurship and Information Technology (2019–20)
- Indrek Laul, director of the Estonia Piano Factory
- Henn Põlluaas, president of the Riigikogu (2019–21)
- Tarmo Soomere, president of Estonian Academy of Sciences (since 2014)

=== Declined ===
The following individuals were rumored to run by the media, but ultimately did not declare candidacies.

- Jaak Aaviksoo, Minister of Defence (2007–2011); Minister of Education and Research (2011–2014)
- Andrus Ansip, former Prime Minister of Estonia (2005–2014); European Commissioner for Digital Economy and Society (2014–2019)
- Marina Kaljurand, Minister of Foreign Affairs (2015–2016); 2016 presidential candidate; MEP for Estonia (2019–present)
- Jüri Luik, Minister of Defence (1993–1994; 1999–2001; 2017–2021); Minister of Foreign Affairs (1994–1995)
- Ülle Madise, Chancellor of Justice (since 2015)
- Jüri Ratas, former Prime Minister of Estonia (2016–2021); president of the Riigikogu (since 2021)

== Opinion polls ==
Although the president is not elected by popular vote, there has been public opinion polling in order to study the candidates' popularity.

Polling firm	Fieldwork date	Sample size	Ansip Reform	Helme EKRE	Kaljulaid Independent	Kaljurand SDE	Madise Independent	Ratas Kesk	Soomere Independent	Others
Kantar Emor	11–17 August 2021	1,152	–	–	24%	13%	–	–	–	63% (Note: Kaljulaid and Kaljurand received the highest and second-highest percentage of support, respectively, while the remainder of individuals were ranked in the following order, without specific percentages of support being given: Ratas, Soomere, Henn Põlluaas, Jüri Luik, Madise, Ansip, David Vseviov, Jüri Raidla, Siim Kallas, and Alar Karis.)
Turu-uuringute AS	15–21 April 2021	–	5%	6%	18%	16%	–	15%	8%	–
Kantar Emor	8–14 April 2021	1,232	–	10%	21%	–	9%	23%	11%	–

== Endorsements ==
Party	MPs	First round	Second round
Reform Party	34	Alar Karis	Alar Karis
Centre Party	25	Alar Karis	Alar Karis
EKRE	19	Henn Põlluaas (not nominated)	Henn Põlluaas (not nominated)
Isamaa	12	No endorsement	Alar Karis
Social Democrats	11	Kersti Kaljulaid (not nominated)	Alar Karis
Estonia 200	0	Kersti Kaljulaid (not nominated)	Kersti Kaljulaid (not nominated)
Greens	0	Tarmo Soomere & Aveliina Helm (not nominated)	Tarmo Soomere & Aveliina Helm (not nominated)

== Results ==
Candidate	Votes	
Candidate	First round	Second round
Alar Karis	63	72
Invalid/blank votes	16	8
Abstentions	1	0
Not present	21	21
Electorate	101	101
Required supermajority	68	68
