= 2021 Swiss referendums =

Federal referendums were held in Switzerland on 7 March, 13 June, 26 September, and 28 November 2021. Swiss referendums take three forms: popular initiatives, which are citizen proposals to create a new law and require 100,000 valid signatures on a petition to get on the ballot; facultative or optional referendums, which are citizen proposals to approve or reject a piece of existing law and require 50,000 valid signatures on a petition to get on the ballot; and mandatory referendums, which are required to revise the constitution, join an international organisation or introduce emergency federal legislation for over a year.

== March referendums ==
March referendums
- 7 March 2021

Ban on full facial coverings
For	51%
Against	49%

Federal Act on Electronic Identification Services
For	36%
Against	64%

Economic Partnership Agreement with Indonesia
For	52%
Against	48%

Three referendums were held in March; one on a popular initiative 'Yes to a ban on full facial coverings', one on the Federal Act on Electronic Identification Services (e-ID Act), and one on the economic partnership agreement with Indonesia.

=== Ban on full facial coverings ===
The results of the March 2021 referendum on Banning the Burka by canton. Red indicates opposition to the ban on the Burka, and green supports the banning of the Burka.

Switzerland voted on a referendum that would prohibit covering one's face in public spaces, and would outlaw anyone from forcing another to cover their face. It would apply to all public spaces including the street, public transport, restaurants and shops. It was proposed by the Egerkingen Committee, which also sponsored the successful referendum to ban minaret construction. The referendum is supported by the Swiss People's Party and the Federal Democratic Union of Switzerland. It is opposed by the Green Party of Switzerland, Green Liberal Party of Switzerland, Social Democratic Party of Switzerland, The Centre and FDP.The Liberals. Despite The Centre and FDP.The Liberals party's stance was officially opposed, polls showed that 70%, 61% and 71%, 65% of their voters supported the yes vote.

Two cantons, Ticino and St. Gallen, have instituted bans on face coverings, while three—Glarus, Schwyz and Zürich—have rejected such bans.

Proponents argue that the ban will enhance security as it will help identify criminals who cover their faces in public. They also argue that women's rights will be enhanced as no one can be forced to wear veils. Opponents argue that the ban is inconsistent with people's constitutional rights and that women who are no longer permitted to veil in public might withdraw from society. In addition, opponents have asserted that, under current law, no one can be forced to wear a burqa, and that anyone forcing someone to do so can be punished.

The Federal Council expressed opposition to the referendum, arguing that it would infringe upon the rights of the cantons and would harm tourism. There are approximately 400,000 Muslims living in Switzerland; however, the Federal Council estimated that fewer than 100 women in the country employ full face coverings and the ban has little practical effect. To address some of the proponents' concerns, the Parliament of Switzerland passed a law that would take effect if the referendum fails that would require anyone with a face covering to show their faces if requested by authorities for identification.

An opinion poll published in January 2021 showed 63% of voters in favour of the proposed ban on full facial coverings, also referred to as a "burqa ban".

=== Federal Act on Electronic Identification Services ===
The referendum would establish a Federal E-ID Commission that would oversee issuance of a nationwide electronic ID to residents. The new E-ID could be used on the internet to order goods and services, open bank accounts or request official documents. The law is supported by the Federal Council and the Parliament.

The E-IDs would be issued initially by the Swiss Sign Group, which operates Swiss ID. This group includes Swiss Post, Swiss Federal Railways, Swisscom and banks and insurance companies. The Federal commission would supervise the system and ensure compliance with regulations. Proponents argue that this could consolidate the number means of identification used online into a single secure login. It would ultimately be scaled into additional online activities. Also, by establishing state control of the system. proponents believe that the system would be more secure. Opponents believe that the system of issuance through banks and insurance companies could compromise data security and that the IDs could be used by the companies for private gain. The opponents believe that the state should issue the IDs itself.

The political parties in support include The Centre, FDP.The Liberals, the Swiss People's Party and the Evangelical People's Party of Switzerland. Opposing parties include the Green Party of Switzerland, Green Liberal Party of Switzerland, Social Democratic Party of Switzerland and Federal Democratic Union of Switzerland.

=== Economic Partnership Agreement with Indonesia ===
In 2018 the European Free Trade Association concluded a free-trade agreement with Indonesia. In 2020, opponents of the agreement filed 60,000 signatures to bring the agreement to a popular vote. This is only the second time in 50 years that a free trade agreement has been subjected to a referendum.

The agreement will reduce most customs duties for products exported from Switzerland to Indonesia while eliminating tariffs on industrial products imported to Switzerland. Tariffs on palm oil would be reduced by 20 to 40 percent up to a maximum quota of 12,500 tons. There would also be sustainability requirements around the import of palm oil. Companies would have to certify that they have not engaged in deforestation in the production of palm oil. In the event of violations, Switzerland could reverse the tariff reductions.

Proponents argue that the agreement will enhance trade for Switzerland while imposing requirements on human rights, rainforests and sustainable palm oil production. Opponents have pointed out that palm oil production is damaging to the environment and harms local farmers. In addition, they are concerned that cheaper palm oil would displace locally produced goods such as rapeseed and sunflower oil that are subject to more sustainability. Finally, the opponents charge that the mechanisms and sanctions for violating the sustainability regulations lack teeth.

The Swiss market for palm oil was about 32,000 tons annually from 2012 to 2019 and supporters of the agreement suggest that the savings to Swiss companies could be about CHF 25 million at a cost of CHF 8 million in lost tariffs.

Parties supporting the agreement include The Centre, FDP.The Liberals, Swiss People's Party, Green Liberal Party of Switzerland and Federal Democratic Union of Switzerland. Opposed are the Green Party of Switzerland, Social Democratic Party of Switzerland and the Evangelical People's Party of Switzerland.

=== Results ===
Question	For			Against			Invalid/ blank	Total votes	Registered voters	Turnout	Outcome
Question	Votes	%	Cantons	Votes	%	Cantons	Invalid/ blank	Total votes	Registered voters	Turnout	Outcome
Ban on full facial coverings	1,427,344	51.19	16 4/2	1,360,750	48.81	4 2/2	38,124	2,826,218	5,496,858	51.42	Approved
Federal Act on Electronic Identification Services	984,574	35.64	–	1,778,196	64.36	–	56,431	2,819,201	5,496,858	51.29	Rejected
Economic Partnership Agreement with Indonesia	1,408,462	51.65	–	1,318,688	48.35	–	81,930	2,809,080	5,496,858	51.10	Approved
Source: Federal Chancellery

== June referendums ==
Five questions were included in the 13 June referendum, two of which were popular initiatives and three of which were facultative referendums.

- A referendum on the COVID-19 Act, enacted in September 2020 to contain the COVID-19 pandemic in Switzerland. The referendum was launched by opponents of the legislation organized as the campaign group Friends of the Constitution. The legislation is supported by the Swiss government.
- A referendum on the Federal Act on Police Measures to Combat Terrorism (PMCT), a law enacted in September 2020 that granted more power to the government to act against suspected terrorism and extremist violence. The legislation authorized police to take preventive measures against suspected extremist threats, and made it a criminal offense to recruit, travel, or train with intent to commit an act of terrorism. The Young Liberal Greens, Socialist Youth, Young Greens, and some human rights groups sponsored the referendum because they believe the legislation infringes on civil liberties.
- A referendum on the Federal Act on the Reduction of Greenhouse Gas Emissions (CO_{2} Act), enacted in September 2020. The Act reduces emissions of carbon dioxide and other greenhouse gases, specifically by using tax policy to cut greenhouse gas emissions by 50% (compared to 1990 levels) by 2030. The Act is supported by most parties, but opposed by the Swiss People's Party, which launched the referendum in hopes of repealing the law.
- The "For a Switzerland without artificial pesticides" popular initiative would ban synthetic pesticides in Switzerland and the import of food crops grown using synthetic pesticides. The referendum's proponent is a winemaker who practices organic farming, and it is supported by environmentalists and the Green Party. It is opposed by agrochemical companies and the Swiss agribusiness lobby (the Swiss Farmers' Union), as well as the Swiss government.
- The "For clean drinking water and healthy food" popular initiative would require that "agricultural subsidies be allocated only to agricultural practices that do not harm the environment and do not pollute drinking water." The initiative would ban subsidies to farmers who use pesticides or administer prophylactic antibiotics to animals (i.e., antibiotics without a medical need). The proposal is supported by environmentalists and the Green Party, and opposed by the Swiss government.

=== Results ===
Question	For			Against			Invalid/ blank	Total votes	Registered voters	Turnout	Outcome
Question	Votes	%	Cantons	Votes	%	Cantons	Invalid/ blank	Total votes	Registered voters	Turnout	Outcome
COVID-19 Act	1,936,344	60.20	16 2/2	1,280,128	39.80	4 4/2	68,854	3,285,326	5,507,117	59.66	Approved
Federal Act on combatting terrorism	1,811,795	56.58	–	1,390,383	43.42	–	78,175	3,280,353	5,507,117	59.57	Approved
Federal Act on greenhouse gas emissions	1,568,032	48.41	–	1,671,210	51.59	–	48,524	3,287,766	5,507,117	59.70	Rejected
For a Switzerland without artificial pesticides	1,280,026	39.44	1/2	1,965,161	60.56	20 5/2	46,059	3,291,246	5,507,117	59.76	Rejected
For clean drinking water and healthy food	1,276,117	39.31	1/2	1,970,332	60.69	20 5/2	45,447	3,291,896	5,507,117	59.78	Rejected
Source: Federal Chancellery

== September referendums ==
Two questions were included in the 26 September referendum, one popular initiative and one facultative referendum.

- Popular initiative from 2 April 2019 on taxes (the "99% initiative") – rejected by 65% of voters.
- A referendum on the Swiss Civil Code from 18 December 2020 (Marriage for all) – approved by 64% of voters.

=== Results ===
Question	For			Against			Invalid/ blank	Total votes	Registered voters	Turnout	Outcome
Question	Votes	%	Cantons	Votes	%	Cantons	Invalid/ blank	Total votes	Registered voters	Turnout	Outcome
Popular initiative on taxes	987,045	35.12	0	1,823,262	64.88	20 6/2	72,572	2,882,879	5,519,168	52.23	Rejected
Same sex marriage	1,828,642	64.10	–	1,024,307	35.90	–	50,279	2,903,228	5,519,168	52.60	Approved
Source: Federal Chancellery

== November referendums ==
Three questions were included in the 28 November referendum; two popular initiatives, and one facultative referendum.

- The "For strong nursing care" (Für eine starke Pflege (Pflegeinitiative)) popular initiative calls for federal regulation of working conditions for nurses in hospitals and nursing homes, as well as federal regulation of adequate compensation for nurses, work/life balance and professional development. The Federal Council and Parliament opposes the initiative on the grounds that it is federal overreach, but polling shows that the initiative enjoys broad popular support.
- The "Justice initiative" (Justiz-Initiative) calls for judges to be selected through a lottery from a pool of candidates selected by an independent commission selected by the Federal Assembly. Within this system, judges will not be subject to re-election. The lottery system would replace the current system, in which judges are elected by the Federal Assembly, and pay dues to political parties. Supporters of the initiative argue that the current system politicizes judges, while a lottery system will allow them to be independent of politics. The Federal Council opposes this initiative.
- The "Amendment of 19 March 2021 of the Covid-19 Law" (Änderung vom 19. März 2021 des Covid-19-Gesetzes) expands financial aid to people impacted by the COVID-19 crisis; allows for federal contact tracing; allows the federal government to promote and cover the costs of Covid testing; and provides the legal basis for a Covid certificate for recovered, vaccinated, and tested citizens to facilitate travel abroad, and allow certain events to take place. Opponents argue that it promotes excessive surveillance, and divides the Swiss populace. The Federal Council supports it, which also enjoys popular support in Switzerland.

=== Results ===
Question	For			Against			Invalid/ blank	Total votes	Registered voters	Turnout	Outcome
Question	Votes	%	Cantons	Votes	%	Cantons	Invalid/ blank	Total votes	Registered voters	Turnout	Outcome
For strong nursing care	2,161,272	60.98	20 5/2	1,382,824	39.02	1/2	66,494	3,610,590	5,528,244	65.31	Approved
Justice initiative	1,094,989	31.92	0	2,335,148	68.08	20 6/2	145,564	3,575,701	5,528,244	64.68	Rejected
Amendment of the COVID-19 Law	2,222,594	62.02	19 5/2	1,361,084	37.98	1 1/2	50,123	3,633,801	5,528,244	65.72	Approved
Source: Federal Chancellery
