= 2021 Mexican corruption trial referendum =

1 August 2021
- Do you agree or not that the pertinent actions be carried out, in accordance with the constitutional and legal framework, to undertake a process of clarification of the political decisions made in the past years by the political actors, aimed at guaranteeing justice and the rights of potential victims?

Results
Choice	Votes	%
Yes	6,511,385	98.44%
No	102,945	1.56%
Valid votes	6,614,330	99.27%
Invalid or blank votes	48,878	0.73%
Total votes	6,663,208	100.00%
Registered voters/turnout	93,671,697	7.11%
- Results by federal electoral district

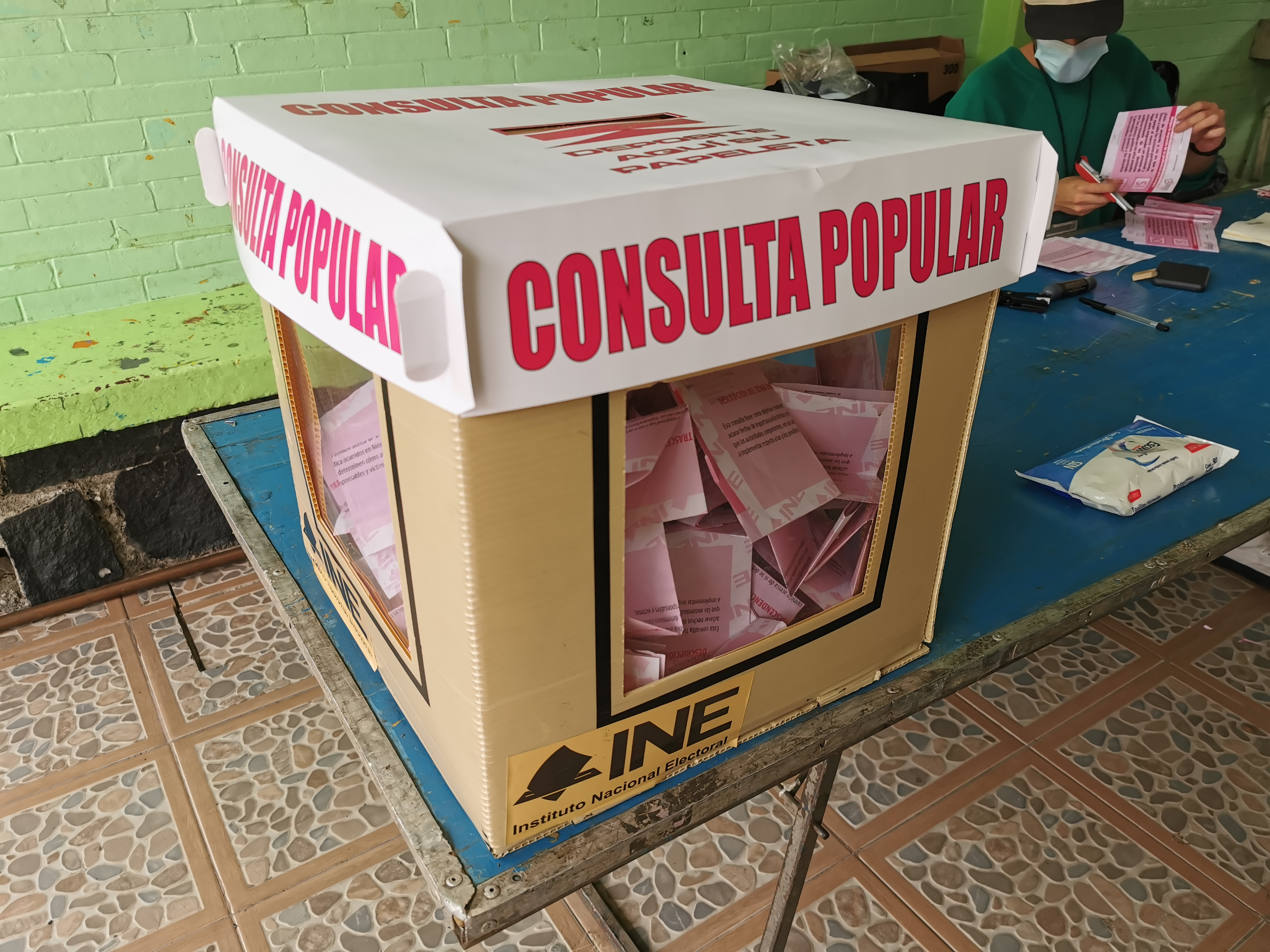
A ballot box in Mexico City

A referendum on corruptions was held in Mexico on August 1, 2021. It sought to consult citizens on whether to carry out "actions to undertake a process of clarification of political decisions made in the past years by political actors". It consisted of a single question:

Original question, in Spanish.	English translation.
¿Estás de acuerdo o no en que se lleven a cabo las acciones pertinentes, con apego al marco constitucional y legal, para emprender un proceso de esclarecimiento de las decisiones políticas tomadas en los años pasados por los actores políticos encaminado a garantizar la justicia y los derechos de las posibles víctimas?	Do you agree or not that the pertinent actions be carried out, in accordance with the constitutional and legal framework, to undertake a process of clarification of the political decisions made in the past years by the political actors, aimed at guaranteeing justice and the rights of potential victims?

On April 6 of the same year, the Instituto Nacional Electoral (INE) began organizing the referendum and, after being denied budget increases, estimated a cost of 522 to 528 million pesos, a third of the initial budget, with 57,000 polling stations to be installed, compared to the 104,667 originally planned. This was the first official popular consultation held throughout the country, although during the government transition period, the then president-elect, Andrés Manuel López Obrador, called public consultations to decide on issues such as the cancellation of the New Mexico City Airport and the new government's priority programs, not organized by the INE and with minimal participation.

Although there were citizen efforts in search of the plebiscite, this was the result of the petition made by López Obrador in September 2020, approved by the Congress of the Union and whose subject matter was declared constitutional by the Supreme Court of Justice of the Nation (SCJN), which, however, modified the original question. Erroneously promoted or criticized as a consultation to "prosecute former presidents", it did not involve the Attorney General's Office (FGR), the judiciary, or specific cases, nor did it point out particular individuals. However, during its organization, it was suggested that it could lead to mechanisms such as truth commissions and, eventually, investigations.

On the same night of the referendum, a quick count was released, which reported a participation interval of between 7.07% and 7.74%, meaning that the results of the exercise, with a large majority in favor of the "Yes" vote, would not be binding since they did not reach the 40% required by law. A day later, the INE reported the final results after the counts, which confirmed a turnout of 7.11% (6.6 million) and 97.72% support for the "Yes" vote (6.5 million).

== Background ==
Before the referendum, Luis Echeverría, who served as president from 1970 to 1976, was the only former officeholder to be judged, being charged with genocide. In 2006, he pleaded guilty to his involvement in the 1968 Tlatelolco massacre and the 1971 Corpus Christi massacre. By 2009, he was exonerated from the accusations.

== Reactions ==
=== Criticism ===
An estimated cost of approximately 79.30 pesos per vote was calculated for the exercise. This was the first official popular consultation in the country, regulated by the Constitution, and had the highest voter turnout. Transitional Justice in Mexico noted that "many people did not participate as a protest because they considered it an exercise and whim of the president, and that it only aimed to use it politically, without containing concrete proposals." The organization argued that the referendum failed because it lacked "real commitment from the executive," evidenced by its failure to propose actions that would "guarantee the rights to truth and justice for the thousands of victims."

No concrete actions were taken as a result of the consultation.

=== Support ===
In his third government report, one month after the exercise, López Obrador only considered the consultation and the actions taken for its realization as a "historic milestone in the democratic consolidation of our country." In this regard, Cruz Parcero (2021) viewed it positively that the "scope and limitations of this type of exercise" were brought to the forefront of public and political discussion.

=== Public reaction ===
According to a survey conducted by El Financiero and published a few days after the referendum, 67% of the four hundred respondents considered the consultation a "failure." In their opinion, this was due to inadequate promotion (38%), lack of interest (20%), and the presence of "other more important issues to consult the public on" (16%), among other reasons. Additionally, 53% leaned towards believing that there would be no "concrete actions" following the exercise, and the low percentage of participation led 59% to deem the results invalid. In contrast, 63% of the participants agreed with establishing a truth commission.

== See also ==
- 2021 in Mexico
