= Burgos (disambiguation) =

Burgos is a city in Spain.

Burgos may also refer to:

== Places ==
=== Spain ===
- Province of Burgos, a province of the autonomous community of Castile and León
- Burgos (Spanish Congress Electoral District), which covers the province

=== Philippines ===
- Burgos, Ilocos Norte, a municipality
- Burgos, Ilocos Sur, a municipality
- Burgos, Isabela, a municipality
- Burgos, La Union, a municipality
- Burgos, Pangasinan, a municipality
- Burgos, Surigao del Norte, a municipality

=== Elsewhere ===
- Burgos, Sardinia, a comune (municipality) in Sassari Province
- Burgos Municipality, Tamaulipas, Mexico

== People ==
- Ambiorix Burgos (born 1984), Major League Baseball player
- Carl Burgos (1918–1984), American comic book and advertising artist
- Dag Burgos (born 1966), Guatemalan Olympic cross-country skier
- Francisco de Burgos Mantilla (1612–1672), Spanish painter
- Gabriel Burgos Ortiz, Puerto Rican drag queen also known as Yara Sofia
- Germán Burgos (born 1969), Argentinian football player
- Javier de Burgos (1778–1848), Spanish writer and politician
- José Burgos (1837–1872), a Spanish-Filipino priest
- Julia de Burgos (1914–1953), Puerto Rican poet and civil-rights activist
- Kike Burgos (born 1971), Spanish football player
- Oscar Orlando Burgos (born 1957), Honduran politician
- Raymond Burgos (born 1998), Puerto Rican baseball player
- Renata Burgos (born 1982), Brazilian freestyle swimmer
- Ricardo Burgos (born 1965), Guatemalan Olympic cross-country skier
- Shane Burgos, UFC Fighter

== Other uses ==
- Roman Catholic Archdiocese of Burgos, encompassing almost all of the Province of Burgos, Spain
- Burgos CF, football club based in Burgos
- Real Burgos CF, football club based in Burgos
- Burgos Airport, an airport of Burgos, Castile and León
- Camisería Burgos, a bespoke shirtmaker in Madrid

== See also ==
- Burgos (surname)
- Burgos Cathedral, a Roman Catholic cathedral in Burgos, Spain
- Padre Burgos, Quezon, Philippines
- Padre Burgos, Southern Leyte, Philippines
- Vuelta a Burgos, an elite men's professional road bicycle racing event held annually in the Burgos province, Castile and León
- Burgo (disambiguation)
- Burgas (disambiguation)
