= Spanish naming customs =

José García Torres (el señor García)	María Acosta Gómez (la señora Acosta)
	Yolanda García Acosta (la señora García)

Spanish names are the traditional way of identifying, and the official way of registering a person in Spain. They are composed of a given name (simple or composite) (Note: A composite given name comprises two (or more) single names; for example Juan Pablo is considered not to be a first and a second forename, but a single composite forename.) and two surnames (the first surname of each parent). Traditionally, the first surname is the father's first surname, and the second is the mother's first surname. Since 1999, the order of the surnames of the children in a family in Spain is decided when registering the first child, but the traditional order is nearly universally chosen (99.53% of the time). (Note: The decree was ratified in February 2000, backdated to be in effect for registrations from November 1999, allowing parents to choose a name order that must be applied to all their children.) Women generally do not change their name with marriage.

The practice is to use one given name and the first surname generally (e.g. "Penélope Cruz" for Penélope Cruz Sánchez); the complete name is reserved for legal, formal and documentary matters. Both surnames are sometimes systematically used when the first surname is very common (e.g., Federico García Lorca, Pablo Ruiz Picasso or José Luis Rodríguez Zapatero) to get a more distinguishable name. In these cases, it is even common to use only the second surname, as in "Lorca", "Picasso" or "Zapatero". This does not affect alphabetization: "Federico García Lorca", the Spanish poet, should be alphabetized in an index under "García Lorca", not "Lorca".

Spanish naming customs were extended to countries under Spanish rule, influencing naming customs of Hispanic America and the Philippines to different extents.

== Basic structure ==
Currently in Spain, people bear a single or composite given name (nombre in Spanish) and two surnames (apellidos in Spanish).

A composite given name is composed of two (or more) single names; for example, Juan Pablo is considered not to be a first and a second forename, but a single composite forename.

The two surnames refer to each of the parental families. Traditionally, a person's first surname is the father's first surname (apellido paterno), while their second surname is the mother's first surname (apellido materno). For example, if a man named Eduardo Fernández Garrido marries a woman named María Dolores Martínez Ruiz (note that women do not change their name with marriage) and they have a child named José, there are several legal options, but their child would most usually be known as José Fernández Martínez.

Spanish gender equality law has allowed surname transposition since 1999, subject to the condition that every sibling must bear the same surname order recorded in the Registro Civil (civil registry), but there have been legal exceptions. Since 2013, if the parents of a child were unable to agree on the order of surnames, an official would decide which is to come first, with the paternal name being the default option. The only requirement is that every son and daughter must have the same order of the surnames, so they cannot change it separately. Since June 2017, adopting the paternal name first is no longer the standard method, and parents are required to sign an agreement wherein the name order is expressed explicitly. The law also grants a person the option, upon reaching adulthood, of reversing the order of their surnames. However, this legislation only applies to Spanish citizens; people of other nationalities are issued the surname indicated by the laws of their original country.

Each of these two surnames can also be composite in itself, with the parts usually linked by:

- the conjunction y or e (and),
- the preposition de (of), or
- a hyphen.

For example, a person's name might be Juan Pablo Fernández de Calderón García-Iglesias, consisting of a forename (Juan Pablo), a paternal surname (Fernández de Calderón), and a maternal surname (García-Iglesias).

=== Forms of address ===
A man named José Antonio Gómez Iglesias would normally be addressed as either señor Gómez or señor Gómez Iglesias instead of señor Iglesias, because Gómez is his first surname. Furthermore, Mr. Gómez might be informally addressed as

1. José Antonio
2. José
3. Pepe (nickname for José)
4. Antonio
5. Toño (nickname for Antonio)
6. Joselito, Josito, Joselillo, Josico or Joselín (diminutives of José)
7. Antoñito, Toñín, Toñito, Ñoño or Nono (diminutives of Antonio)
8. Joseán (apocopation).

Very formally, he could be addressed with an honorific such as don José Antonio or don José.

It is not unusual, when the first surname is very common, like García in the example above, for a person to be referred to formally using both family names, or casually by their second surname only. For example, José Luis Rodríguez Zapatero (elected President of the Spanish Government in the 2004 and 2008 general elections) is often called simply Zapatero, the name he inherited from his mother's family since Rodríguez is a common surname and may be ambiguous. The same occurs with another former Spanish Socialist leader, Alfredo Pérez Rubalcaba, with the poet and dramatist Federico García Lorca, and with the painter Pablo Ruiz Picasso. As these people's paternal surnames are very common, they are often referred to by their maternal surnames (Rubalcaba, Lorca, Picasso). It would nonetheless be a mistake to index Rodríguez Zapatero under Z or García Lorca under L. (Picasso, who spent most of his adult life in France, is normally indexed under "P".)

In an English-speaking environment, Spanish-named people sometimes hyphenate their surnames to avoid having their first surname perceived as a middle name, and their second surname perceived as their only surname.

In Spanish-speaking countries, hyphenated surnames arise when someone wants both the paternal and maternal surnames passed to future generations, and the next generation receives the two, hyphenated, as a single (paternal) surname. Occasionally the two are fused into a simple (unhyphenated) name, such as Jovellanos (from Jove and Llanos). Rarely, the two names are left unhyphenated, such as López Portillo, which may lead to confusion.

=== Forenames ===
Parents choose their child's given name, which must be recorded in the Registro Civil (Civil Registry) to establish their legal identity. With few restrictions, parents can now choose any name; common sources of names are the parents' taste, honouring a relative, the General Roman Calendar nomina (nominal register), and traditional Spanish names. Legislation in Spain under Franco's dictatorship legally limited cultural naming customs to only Christian (Jesus, Mary, saints) and typical Spanish names (Álvaro, Jimena, etc.). Although the first part of a composite forename generally reflects the sex of the child, the second personal name need not (e.g. José María Aznar). At present, the only naming limitation is the dignity of the child, who cannot be given an insulting name. Similar limitations applied against diminutive, familiar, and colloquial variants not recognized as names proper, and "those that lead to confusion regarding sex"; however, current law allows registration of diminutive names.

==== María, José and Jesús in composite given names ====
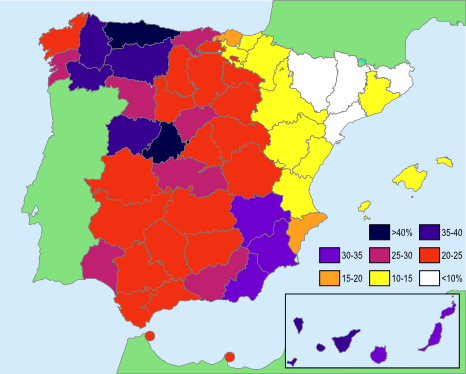
Spanish provincial surname concentrations: percentage of population born with the ten most-common surnames for each province (source: Instituto Nacional de Estadística 2006)

Girls are often named María, honouring the Virgin Mary, by appending either a shrine, place, or religious-concept suffix-name to María. In daily life, such women omit the "Mary of the ..." nominal prefix, and use the suffix portion of their composite names as their public, rather than legal, identity. Hence, women with Marian names such as María de los Ángeles (María of the Angels), María del Pilar (María of the Pillar), and María de la Luz (María of the Light), are normally addressed as Ángeles (Angels), Pilar (Pillar), and Luz (Light); however, each might be addressed as María. Nicknames such as Maricarmen for María del Carmen, Marisol for "María (de la) Soledad" ("Our Lady of Solitude", the Virgin Mary), Dolores or Lola for María de los Dolores ("Our Lady of Sorrows"), Mercedes or Merche for María de las Mercedes ("Our Lady of Mercy"), etc. are often used. Also, parents can simply name a girl María, or Mari without a suffix portion.

It is common for a boy's formal name to include María, preceded by a masculine name, e.g. José María Aznar, Juan María Vicencio de Ripperdá or Antonio María Rouco Varela. Equivalently, a girl can be formally named María José, e.g. skier María José Rienda, and informally named Marijose, Mariajo, Majo, Ajo, Marisé or even José in honour of St. Joseph. María as a masculine name is often abbreviated in writing as M. (José M. Aznar), Ma. (José Ma. Aznar), or M.ª (José M.ª Morelos). It is unusual for any names other than the religiously significant María and José to be used in this way except for the name Jesús that is also very common and can be used as Jesús or Jesús María for a boy and María Jesús for a girl, and can be abbreviated as Sus, Chus and other nicknames.

=== Registered names ===
The Registro Civil (Civil Registry) officially records a child's identity as composed of a forename (simple or composite) and the two surnames; however, a child can be religiously baptized with several forenames, e.g. Felipe Juan Froilán de Todos los Santos. Until the 1960s, it was customary to baptize children with three forenames: the first was the main and the only one used by the child; if parents agreed, one of the other two was the name of the day's saint. Nowadays, baptizing with three or more forenames is usually a royal and noble family practice.

=== Marriage ===
In Spain married people keep their original surnames (unlike in some near cultures in which they may adopt the spouse's family name as a married name). In some instances, such as high society meetings, the partner's surname can be added after the person's surnames using the preposition de (of). An example would be a Leocadia Blanco Álvarez, married to a Pedro Pérez Montilla, may be addressed as Leocadia Blanco de Pérez or as Leocadia Blanco Álvarez de Pérez. This format is not used in everyday settings and has no legal value.

Similarly, a widow may be identified using "viuda de" ("widow of" in Spanish) or its abbreviation "vda." for, as in Leocadia Blanco vda. de Pérez.

=== Generational transmission ===
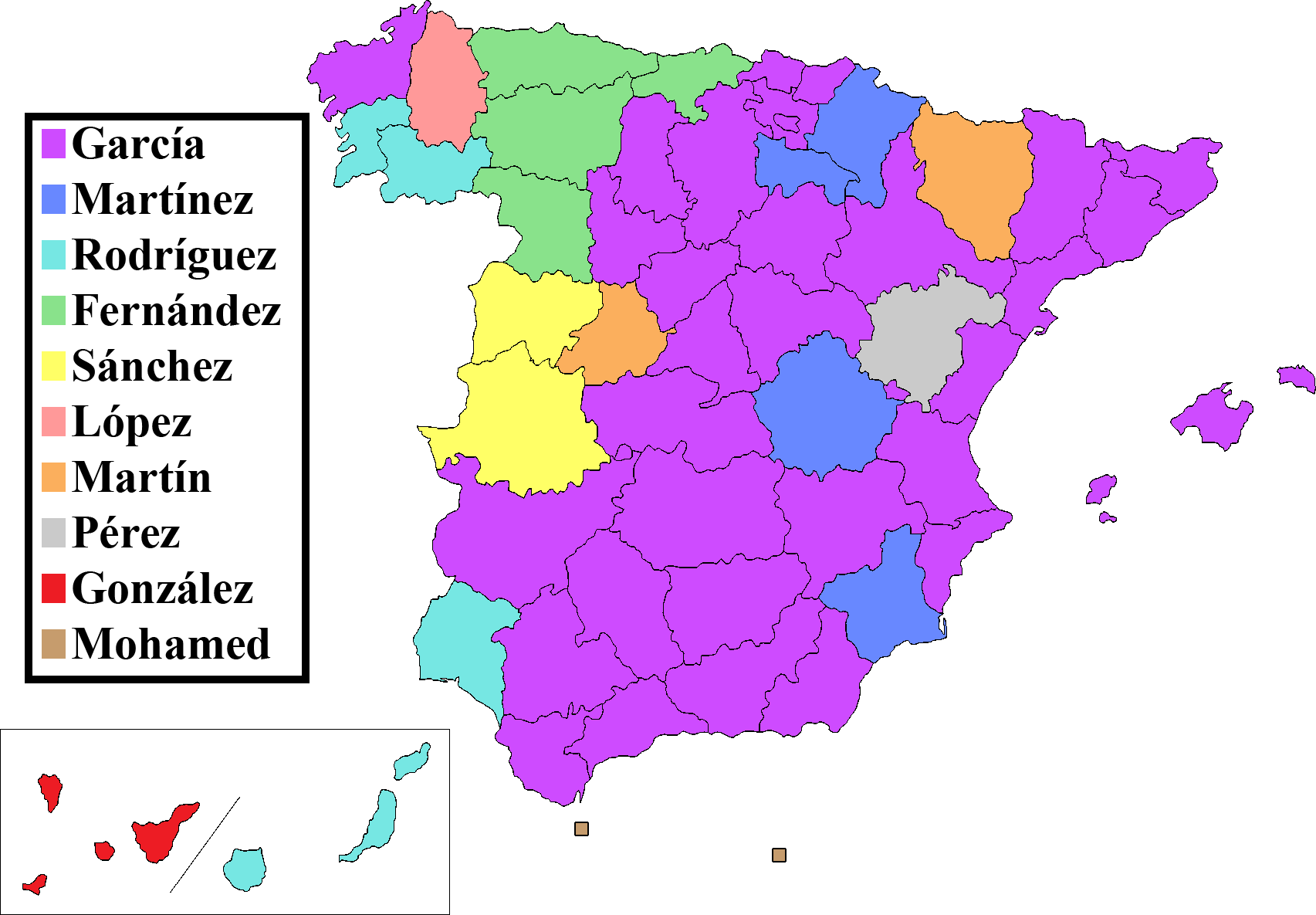
Surname distribution: the most common surnames in Spain, by province of residence

In the generational transmission of surnames, the paternal surname's precedence eventually eliminates the maternal surnames from the family lineage. Contemporary law (1999) allows the maternal surname to be given precedence, but most people observe the traditional paternal–maternal surname order. Therefore, the daughter and son of Ángela López Sáenz and Tomás Portillo Blanco are usually called Laura Portillo López and Pedro Portillo López but could also be called Laura López Portillo and Pedro López Portillo. The two surnames of all siblings must be in the same order when recorded in the Registro Civil. Spanish naming customs include the orthographic option of conjoining the surnames with the conjunction particle y, or e before a name starting with 'I', 'Hi' or 'Y', (both meaning "and") (e.g., José Ortega y Gasset, Tomás Portillo y Blanco, or Eduardo Dato e Iradier), following an antiquated aristocratic usage.

Patrilineal surname transmission was not always the norm in Spanish-speaking societies. Prior to the mid-eighteenth century, when the current paternal-maternal surname combination norm was adopted, Hispanophone societies often practised matrilineal surname transmission, giving children the maternal surname and occasionally giving children a grandparent's surname (borne by neither parent) for prestige – being perceived as gentry – and profit, flattering the matriarch or the patriarch in hope of inheriting land. A more recent example can be found in the name of Francisco de Asís Franco y Martínez-Bordiú (born 1954), who took first the name of his mother, Carmen Franco, rather than that of his father, Cristóbal Martínez-Bordiú, 10th Marquis of Villaverde, in order to perpetuate the family name of his maternal grandfather, the Caudillo Francisco Franco.

Not every surname is a single word; such conjoining usage is common with doubled surnames (maternal-paternal), ancestral composite surnames bequeathed to the following generations – especially when the paternal surname is socially undistinguished. José María Álvarez del Manzano y López del Hierro is an example, his name comprising the composite single name José María and two composite surnames, Álvarez del Manzano and López del Hierro. Other examples derive from church place-names such as San José. When a person bears doubled surnames, the means of disambiguation is to insert y between the paternal and maternal surnames.

In case of illegitimacy – when the child's father either is unknown or refuses to recognize his child legally – the child bears both of the mother's surnames, which may be interchanged.

Occasionally, a person with a common paternal surname and an uncommon maternal surname becomes widely known by the maternal surname. Some examples include the artist Pablo Ruiz Picasso, the poet Federico García Lorca, and the politician José Luis Rodríguez Zapatero. With a similar effect, the foreign paternal surname of the Uruguayan writer Eduardo Hughes Galeano (his father was British) is usually omitted. (As a boy, however, he occasionally signed his name as Eduardo Gius, using a Hispanicized approximation of the English pronunciation of "Hughes".) Such use of the second last name by itself is colloquial, however, and may not be applied in legal contexts.

Also rarely, a person may become widely known by both surnames, with an example being a tennis player Arantxa Sánchez Vicario – whereas her older brothers Emilio and Javier, also professional tennis players, are mainly known only by the paternal surname of Sánchez in everyday life, although they would formally be addressed as Sánchez Vicario.

=== Navarrese and Álavan surnames ===
Where Basque and Romance cultures have linguistically long coexisted, the surnames denote the father's name and the (family) house or town/village. Thus the Romance patronymic and the place-name are conjoined with the prepositional particle de ("from"+"provenance"). For example, in the name José Ignacio López de Arriortúa, the composite surname López de Arriortúa is a single surname, despite Arriortúa being the original family name. This can lead to confusion because the Spanish López and the Basque Arriortúa are discrete surnames in Spanish and Basque respectively. This pattern was also in use in other Basque districts, but was phased out in most of the Basque-speaking areas and only remained in place across lands of heavy Romance influence, i.e. some central areas of Navarre and most of Álava. To a lesser extent, this pattern has been also present in Castile, where Basque-Castilian bilingualism was common in northern and eastern areas up to the 13th century.

A notable example of this system was Joaquina Sánchez de Samaniego y Fernández de Tejada, with both paternal and maternal surnames coming from this system, joined with an y ("and").

== Nominal conjunctions ==
=== The particle "de" (of) ===
In Spanish, the preposition particle de ("of") is used as a conjunction in two different surname styles, and also used in a kind of placeholder role to disambiguate surnames that might be mistaken as additional forenames. The first style is in patronymic and toponymic surname formulæ, e.g. Gonzalo Fernández de Córdoba, Pedro López de Ayala, and Vasco Núñez de Balboa, as in many conquistador names.

In names of persons, the prepositional particle de is written in lower-case when the forename has been included, e.g. José Manuel de la Rúa ("of the street") and Cunegunda de la Torre ("of the tower"); when the forename has been omitted, the de is capitalized, e.g. doctor De la Rúa and señora De la Torre.

Without a patronymic
Juan Carlos de Borbón. Unlike in French names such as d'Alembert, in Spanish orthography "de" is written out in full (not replaced by a contraction) when the surname begins with a vowel. The exception is de el ("of the"), which becomes del, e.g. Carlos Arturo del Monte (Charles Arthur of the Mountain).

The patronymic exception
The current (1958) Spanish name law, Artículo 195 del Reglamento del Registro Civil (Article 195 of the Civil Registry Regulations) does not allow a person to prefix de to their surname, except as the clarifying addition of de to a surname (apellido) that might be misunderstood as a forename (nombre); thus, a child would be registered as Pedro de Miguel Jiménez to avoid the surname Miguel being mistaken as the second part of a composite name, as Pedro Miguel.

Bearing the de particle does not necessarily denote a noble family; especially in names from eastern Castile, Alava, and western Navarre, the de usually meant simply "from", and was applied to the place-name (town or village) from which the person and his or her ancestors originated. This differs from another practice established in the sixteenth and seventeenth centuries, in which de could be applied to one's own name as a way of denoting the bearer's noble heritage, to avoid the misperception that he or she was either a Jew or a Moor. In that time, many people, regardless of their true origins, used the particle, e.g. Miguel de Cervantes, Lope de Vega, etc.; moreover, following that fashion, a high noble such as Francisco Sandoval Rojas called himself Francisco de Sandoval y Rojas. During the eighteenth century, the Spanish nobility fully embraced the French custom of using de as a nobility identifier; however, since many commoners also bore the same particle, the use of de became unclear. Thus, nobility was emphasised with the surname's lineage.

=== The particle "y" (and) ===
In the sixteenth century, the Spanish adopted the copulative conjunction y ("and") to distinguish a person's surnames; thus the Andalusian Baroque writer Luis de Góngora y Argote (1561–1627), the Aragonese painter Francisco José de Goya y Lucientes (1746–1828), the Andalusian artist Pablo Diego Ruiz y Picasso (1881–1973), and the Madrilenian liberal philosopher José Ortega y Gasset (1883–1955).

The conjunction y avoids denominational confusion when the paternal surname might appear to be a (first) name: without it, the physiologist Santiago Ramón y Cajal might appear to be named Santiago Ramón (composite) and surnamed Cajal, likewise the jurist Francisco Tomás y Valiente, and the cleric Vicente Enrique y Tarancón. Without the conjunction, the footballer Rafael Martín Vázquez, when referred to by his surnames Martín Vázquez mistakenly appears to be forenamed Martín rather than Rafael, whilst, to his annoyance, the linguist Fernando Lázaro Carreter occasionally was addressed as Don Lázaro, rather than as Don Fernando (Lázaro can be either forename or surname).

When the conjunction y is used and the maternal surname begins with an i vowel sound — whether written with the vowel I (Ibarra), the vowel Y (Ybarra archaic spelling), or the combination Hi + consonant (Higueras) — Spanish euphony substitutes e in place of the word y; thus the example of the Spanish statesman Eduardo Dato e Iradier (1856–1921).

In Colonial Spanish America, this spelling convention was common among clergymen (e.g. Salvadoran Bishop Óscar Arnulfo Romero y Galdámez), and sanctioned by the Ley de Registro Civil (Civil Registry Law) of 1870, which required birth certificates to indicate the paternal and maternal surnames conjoined with y – thus, Felipe González y Márquez and José María Aznar y López are the respective legal names of the Spanish politicians Felipe González Márquez and José María Aznar López; however this is uncommon even in formal documents, except in Catalonia, where the equivalent i particle is included between both surnames most of the times.

==== Outside of Spain ====
In most of Hispanic America, there no longer exists an equivalent law codifying surname differentiation via the use of y, and as a consequence, names that invoke y generally will always be read the same in both formal (legal) and informal contexts.

In the Philippines, y and its associated usages are retained only in formal state documents such as police records, but is otherwise dropped in favour of a more American-influenced naming order.

== Denotations ==
To communicate a person's social identity, Spanish naming customs provide orthographic means, such as suffix-letter abbreviations, surname spellings, and place names, which denote and connote the person's place in society.

=== Identity and descent ===
p. (father of): A man named like his son may add the lower-case suffix p. (denoting padre, father) to his surname. An example of this is José Luis Lorena, p., to distinguish him from his son José Luis Lorena; the English analogue is "Sr." (senior).

h. (son of): A man named like his father may append the lower-case suffix h. (denoting hijo, son) to his surname, thus distinguishing himself, Juan Gómez Marcos, h., from his father, Juan Gómez Marcos; the English analogue is "Jr." (junior).

==== The suffix -ez ====
Following the Visigothic invasion of the Iberian peninsula, the local population adopted to a large extent a patronymic naming system: the suffix -icī (a Latin genitive meaning son of) would be attached to the father's forename to create a patronymic for the son. This suffix gradually evolved into different local forms, depending on the language. For example, the son of Fernando would be called:

- Asturian: Fernándi
- Basque: Fernanditz
- Castilian: Fernández
- Catalan: Ferrandis
- Portuguese and Galician: Fernandes

This system was most common in, but not limited to, the central region of Castile. Bare surnames, i.e. the father's name without the suffix -itz/-ez/-is/-es, can also be found, and are especially common in Catalonia. This said, mass migration in the 20th century has led to a certain levelling of such regional differences.

In Catalan speaking areas, the suffixed surname Ferrandis is most common in the South (the Valencian Country) while in the North (Catalonia) the bare surname Ferran is more common. Furthermore, language contact led to the creation of multiple hybrid forms, as evidenced by the multiple Catalano-Castilian surnames, found especially in the Valencian Country: Fernàndez, Fernandis, Fernàndiz, Ferrandez, Ferràniz, Ferranis, etc.

Not every surname that resembles this pattern is patronymic. Due to the letters z and s being pronounced alike in American dialects of Spanish, many non-patronymic surnames with an -es have come to be written with an -ez. In American Spanish, the -ez spellings of Chávez (Hugo Chávez), Cortez (Alberto Cortez) and Valdez (Nelson Valdez) are not patronymic surnames, but simply variant spellings of the Iberian Spanish spelling with -es, as in the names of Manuel Chaves, Hernán Cortés and Víctor Valdés. For more on the -z surnames in Spanish see Influences on the Spanish language.

A number of the most common surnames with the patronymic suffix -ez:

- Álvarez – the son of Álvar, Álvaro
- Antúnez – the son of Antón, Antonio
- Benéitez, Benítez – the son of Benito
- Díaz, Díez, Diéguez – the son of Diego
- Domínguez – the son of Domingo
- Enríquez – the son of Enrique
- Estévez – the son of Esteve, Estevo, Esteban
- Fernández – the son of Fernando
- Giménez, Jiménez, Ximénez – the son of Gimeno, Jimeno, Ximeno
- Gómez – the son of Gome, Gomo
- González – the son of Gonzalo
- Gutiérrez – the son of Gutierre, Gutier
- Hernández – the son of Hernando
- Ibáñez – the son of Iván, Juan
- López – the son of Lope
- Márquez – the son of Marco, Marcos
- Méndez – the son of Mendo
- Míguez, Miguélez – the son of Miguel
- Martínez – the son of Martín
- Muñoz – the son of Munio
- Núñez – the son of Nuño
- Peláez – the son of Pelayo
- Pérez – the son of Pedro
- Rodríguez – the son of Rodrigo
- Ruiz – the son of Ruy, Roy
- Ramírez – the son of Ramiro
- Sánchez – the son of Sancho
- Suárez – the son of Suero
- Téllez – the son of Tello
- Vásquez, Vázquez – the son of Vasco, Velasco
- Velázquez, Velásquez – the son of Velasco
- Vélez – the son of Vela

=== Foundlings ===
Anonymous abandoned children were a problem for civil registrars to name. Some such children were named after the town where they were found (toponymic surname). Because most were reared in church orphanages, some were also given the surnames Iglesia or Iglesias (church[es]) and Cruz (cross). Blanco (with the meaning "blank", rather than "white") was another option. A toponymic first surname might have been followed by Iglesia(s) or Cruz as a second surname.

Nameless children were sometimes given the surname Expósito/Expósita (from Latin exposĭtus, "exposed", meaning "abandoned child"), which marked them, and their descendants, as of a low caste or social class. Due to this, in 1921 Spanish law started to allow holders of the surname Expósito to legally change their surname. In the Catalan language, the surname Deulofeu ("made by God") was often given out to these children, which is similar to De Dios ("from God") in Castilian.

Furthermore, in Aragón abandoned children would receive the surname Gracia ("grace") or de Gracia, because they were thought to survive by the grace of God.

=== Foreign citizens ===
In Spain, foreign immigrants retain use of their cultural naming customs, but upon becoming Spanish citizens, they are legally obliged to assume Spanish-style names (one forename and two surnames). If the naturalized citizen is from a one-surname culture, either their current surname is doubled or their mother's maiden name is adopted as the second surname. For example, a Briton with the name "Sarah Jane Smith" could become either "Sarah Jane Smith Smith" or "Sarah Jane Smith Jones" upon acquiring Spanish citizenship. Formally, Spanish naming customs would also mean that the forename "Sarah" and middle name "Jane" would be treated as a compound forename: "Sarah Jane".

=== Flamenco artists ===
Historically, flamenco artists seldom used their proper names. According to the flamenco guitarist Juan Serrano, this was because flamenco was considered disreputable and they did not want to embarrass their families:

We have to start with the history of the gypsies in Spain. They gained a bad reputation because of the minor crimes they had to commit to survive. They did not have any kind of jobs, they had to do something to live, and of course this created hostility. And Flamenco was the music of the Gypsies, so many high society people did not accept it – they said Flamenco was in the hands of criminals, bandits, et cetera. And the girls, that maybe liked dancing or singing, their parents said, "Oh no, you want to be a prostitute!".

— Juan Serrano, interview in Guitar International, Nov 1987

This tradition of not using one's proper name has persisted to the present day, even though flamenco is now legitimate. Sometimes the artistic name consists of the home town appended to the first name (Manolo Sanlúcar, Ramón de Algeciras); but many, perhaps most, such names are more eccentric: Pepe de la Matrona (because his mother was a midwife); Perico del Lunar (because he had a mole); Tomatito (son of a father known as Tomate (tomato) because of his red face); Sabicas (because of his childhood passion for green beans, from niño de las habicas); Paco de Lucía, born Francisco ("Paco") Gustavo Sánchez Gomes, was known from infancy after his Portuguese mother, Lucía Gomes (de Lucía = [son] of Lucía). And many more. When referring to these artists by their assumed names, it makes no sense to shorten the name to its qualifier, such as "Lucía" or "de Lucía"; Paco, or perhaps "el de Lucía", are the only options.

=== Spanish hypocoristics and nicknames ===
Many Spanish names can be shortened into hypocoristic, affectionate "child-talk" forms using a diminutive suffix, especially -ito and -cito (masculine) and -ita and -cita (feminine). Sometimes longer than the person's name, a nickname is usually derived via linguistic rules. However, in contrast to English use, hypocoristic names in Spanish are only used to address a person in a very familiar environment – the only exception being when the hypocoristic is an artistic name (e.g. Nacho Duato born Juan Ignacio Duato). The common English practice of using a nickname in the press or media, or even on business cards (such as Bill Gates instead of William Gates), is not accepted in Spanish, being considered excessively colloquial. The usages vary by country and region; these are some usual names and their nicknames:

- Adelaida = Ade, Adela
- Adelina = Deli, Lina
- Adrián (Male) or Adriana (Female) = Adri
- Alberto = Alber, Albertito, Beto, Berto, Tico, Tuco, Tito, Albi
- Alejandra/Alexandra = Sandra, Ale, Álex, Alexa, Lexa, Aleja, Jandra, Chandra, Jana, Lala
- Alejandro = Ale, Álex, Alejo, Jandro, Jano, Cano, Sandro, Pando
- Alfonso = Alfon, Fon, Fonso, Fonsi, Poncho, Loncho
- Alfredo = Fredi, Fredo
- Alicia = Ali, Licha
- Ana Isabel = Anabel
- Anacleto = Cleto
- Apolinar = Polo
- Andrea, Andreo, Andrés, Andressa = Andi, Andresito, Andresita
- Agustín = Agus, Gusto, Tin
- Antonia = Toña, Tona, Toñi, Toñita, Tonia, Antoñita
- Antonio = Antón, Tonio, Toni, Tono, Nono, Tonino, Tonito, Toño, Toñín, Antoñito, Antuco, Antuquito
- Antonino = Nino
- Anunciación = Chona, Nunci
- Apolinar = Polo
- Ariadna = Ari
- Arturo = Arturito, Turito, Art, Archie, Lito
- Arcángel = Ángel
- Arcenio/Arsenio = Arcenito, Cheno
- Armando = Mando, Mandi
- Ascensión = Ascen, Choni
- Asunción = Asun, Susi, Suni, Suza
- Aurelio = Yeyo, Aure
- Bartola = Tola, Barta
- Bartolomé = Bartolo, Barto, Tomé, Tolo
- Beatriz = Bea, Beti (o Betty), Betina
- Begoña = Bego
- Benjamín = Ben, Benja, Benjas, Benji, Jamín
- Berenice = Bere
- Bernabé = Berna
- Bernardino = Bérnar, Nino
- Bernardo = Bérnar, Ber, Nardo
- Basílio = Silio
- Basília = Sília
- Basílica = Biqui
- Bonifacio = Boni
- Buenaventura = Ventura, Ventu, Venturi
- Candelaria = Can, Cande, Candi, Candelita, Canda, Candela
- Cándido/a = Candi
- Caridad = Cari, Carita, Caruca, Cuca
- Carla = Carlita
- Carlos = Carlito, Carlitos, Carlo, Calo, Calín, Carlines, Litos, Charli, Chepe
- Carmen = Mamen, Carmita, Carmenchu, Menchu, Carmencha, Carmencita, Carmelita, Carmela, Carmina, Mecha, Mencha, Carmucha, Mucha, Maricarmen
- Carolina = Caro, Cárol, Caroli, Carito
- Catalina = Cata, Lina, Cati, Catina, Caty
- Cayetano = Caye, Tano, Cayo
- Cecilia = Ceci, Cece, Cilia, Chila, Chili
- Celestino = Celes, Cele, Tino
- César = Checha, Cesito, Cesítar
- Ciro = Cirino
- Claudia = Clau, Claudi
- (Inmaculada) Concepción = Conchi, Conchita, Concha, Conce, Ciona, Cione, Chon, Choni, Inma, Macu
- Consolación = Conso
- Constantino = Tino
- Consuelo = Consu, Chelo, Coni, Conchi, Conchis
- Covadonga = Cova, Covi
- Cristian = Cris, Cristo
- Cristina = Cris, Cristi, Crista, Tina
- Cristóbal = Cris, Cristo, Toba
- Cristóforo = Cuco, Chosto
- Cruz = Crucita, Chuz
- Dalia = Dali
- Dalila = Lila
- Daniel (Male) or Daniela (Female) = Dani
- David = Davo, Davilo
- Diego = Didi, Dieguito
- Dolores = Lola, Loli, Lolita, Loles
- Eduardo = Edu, Lalo, Eduardito, Duardo, Guayo
- Eladio = Lalo, Yayo
- Eliana = Eli, Elia, Liana
- Elena = Nena
- Eloísa = Elo
- Encarnación = Encarna, Encarni, Encarnita
- Enrique = Quique, Quico, Kike, Kiko
- Ernesto = Neto, Netico, Tito
- Esmeralda = Esme, Mera, Lala
- Esperanza = Espe, Pera, Lancha, Pancha, Peri
- Esteban = Estebi
- Estefanía = Estefa, Estefi
- Eugenia = Genita, Kena
- Eugenio = Genio, Genín, Genito
- Eulalia = Lali, Lala, Leya
- Eva = Evita
- Facundo = Facu
- Federico = Fede, Fico, Quico
- Felícita = Feli, Felacha
- Felipe = Fele, Pipe, Lipe
- Faustino = Tino, Tinín, Fausto
- Fermín = Mincho, Fermo
- Fernanda = Fer, Nanda, Feña
- Fernando = Fer, Nando, Nano, Ferni, Feña, Fercho
- Florencia = Flor, Flora, Florci, Florcita, Florchi, Florchu, Lencha
- Florencio = Floro, Lencho
- Francisca = Fran, Paqui, Paquita, Sisca, Cisca, Pancha, Curra, Paca, Quica, Panchita, Panchi
- Francisco = Fran, Francis, Paco, Sisco, Cisco, Chisco, Curro, Quico, Kiko, Franco, Frasco, Frascuelo, Pacho, Pancho, Panchito
- Gabriel = Gabo, Gabri
- Gabriela = Gabi, Gabrielita
- Gerardo = Gera, Yayo, Lalo
- Germán = Mancho
- Gertrudis = Tula
- Gloria María = Glorimar
- Gonzalo = Gonza, Gon, Gonzo, Gonchi, Lalo, Chalo, Talo, Tali
- Graciela = Chela
- Gregorio = Goyo, Gorio
- Griselda = Gris, Celda
- Guadalupe = Lupe (female & male), Guada, Pupe, Lupita, Lupilla (female) & Lupito, Lupillo (male), Pita (female)
- Guillermo = Guille, Guíller, Guillo, Meme, Momo, Memo
- Gustavo = Gus
- Gumersindo = Gúmer, Gume, Sindo.
- Héctor = Tito, Torín, Hertico
- Hermenegildo = Hildo
- Hipólito = Polo
- Hortensia = Horten, Tencha
- Humberto, Huberto, Adalberto = Berto, Beto
- Ignacia = Nacha, Nacia, Ina
- Ignacio = Nacho, Nacio, Nachito, Naco, Iñaqui, Iñaki
- Inocencia = Chencha, Checha
- Inocencio = Chencho, Checho
- Isabel = Bela, Beli, Belica, Sabel, Sabela, Chabela, Chavela, Chavelita, Chabelita, Isa
- Ismael = Isma, Mael, Maelo
- Israel = Irra, Rai
- Iván = Ivi, Ivo
- Jacobo = Cobo, Yaco, Yago
- Jaime = Jaimón, Jimmy
- Javier = Javi, Javo, Javito
- Jorge = Jorgecito, Jorgis, Jorgito, Gorge, Jecito, Coque, Koke
- Jerónimo = Jero, Jeronimillo
- Jesús = Jesu, Chus, Xus, Chuso, Chusi, Chucho, Chuchi, Chuy, Suso, Susi, Chuyito
- Jesús Alberto = Jesusbeto, Chuybeto
- Jesús Manuel = Jesusma
- Jesús María = Chumari, Chusma, Jesusmari
- Jesús Ramón = Jerra, Jesusra, Chuymoncho, Chuymonchi
- Jesusa = Susi, Sus, Chusa, Susa, Chucha, Chuy, Chuyita
- Jimena/Ximena = Jime, Mena
- Joaquín = Joaco, Juaco, Quin, Quim, Quino, Quincho, Chimo/Ximo
- José = Jose, Pepe, Chepe, Pepito, Chepito, Pito, Pepín, Pepu, Chechu, Cheo
- José Ángel/José Antonio = Josean, Josan
- José Carlos = Joseca, Seco
- José Luis = Joselo, Joselu, Pepelu, Selu
- José Manuel = Josema, Chema/Xema, Chemita/Xemita, Chemanu/Xemanu
- José María = Chema/Xema, Chemari/Xemari, Josemari, Josema
- José Miguel = Josemi, Jomi, Chemi
- José Ramón = Peperramón, Joserra, Cherra
- Josefa = Pepa, Pepi, Pepita, Pina, Fina, Fini, Finita
- Josefina = Jose, Fina, Pepa, Pepita, Chepina, Chepa, Chepita
- Juan = Juanito, Juanín, Juancho, Juanelo, Juampi, Juanci
- Juan Andrés = Juanan
- Juan Camilo = Juanca, Juancho, Juanqui, Juanquis
- Juan Carlos = Juanca, Juáncar, Juanqui
- Juan Cristóbal = Juancri, Juancris
- Juan Ernesto = Juáner
- Juan Esteban = Juanes
- Juan Felipe = Juanfe, Pipe
- Juan Fernando = Juánfer
- Juan Francisco = Juanfran
- Juan Ignacio = Juancho
- Juan Javier = Juanja
- Juan José = Juanjo, Juancho
- Juan Leonardo = Juanle
- Juan Luis = Juanlu
- Juan Manuel = Juanma
- Juan Miguel = Juangui, Juanmi
- Juan Pablo = Juampa, Juampi, Juampis
- Juan Rafael = Juanra
- Juan Ramón = Juanra
- Juan Salvador = Juansa
- Juan Vicente = Juanvi
- Julián = Juli, Julianito, Julianillo
- Julio = Julín, Julito, Juli
- Laura = Lalita, Lala, Lauri, Lauris, Lau, Laurita
- Leticia = Leti
- Leonardo = Leo, León, Leoncito
- Libertad = Libby, Libia, Berta, Beta
- Liborio = Libo, Borio, Boro
- Lorena = Lore, Lora
- Lorenzo = Lencho, Enzo, Renzo
- Lourdes = Lourditas, Lulú
- Lucía = Luci, Lucita, Chía, Chita
- Luciano = Chano, Ciano, Lucho
- Luis = Lucho, Luisito, Güicho, Luisín, Sito
- Luis Felipe = Luisfe
- Luis Manuel = Luisma
- Luis María = Luisma
- Luis Mariano = Luisma
- Luis Miguel = Luismi
- Luisa = Lisa, Lía, Luisita, Luchita
- Luz Ángela = Luzán, Lusán
- Luz Maria = Luzma
- Macarena = Maca, Cara
- Magdalena = Magda, Mada, Malena, Mane, Manena, Lena, Leni, Lenita, Nena
- Manuel = Manu, Lolo, Mano, Meño, Manuelito, Lito, Lillo, Mani, Manué, Manel, Mel, Nel, Nelo
- Manolo = Lolo, Manolito, Mano, Manolillo, Lito, Lillo, Manolín
- Marcelina = Lina, Marce, Celina, Chela
- Marcelo = Chelo, Marce
- Margarita = Marga, Margari, Magui, Rita, Mague
- María = Mari, Maruja, Marujita, Marica, Marita, Mariquita, Mariquilla, Iah
- María Aurora = Marora
- María Auxiliadora = Chilo, Mauxi, Mausi, Mauchi, Dori, Dora, Madora
- María de Dolores = Lola, Loles, Loli, Lolita, Mariló
- María de Jesús = Marichúy, Marichusa
- María de la Cruz = Maricruz
- María de la Luz = Mariluz, Luz, Malú
- María de las Nieves = Marinieves, Nieves
- María de los Ángeles = Marielos, Marian, Ángeles, Ángela, Angie, Angy, Mariángeles
- María de Lourdes = Malula, Marilú, Lulú
- María del Carmen = Maricarmen, Mamen, Mai, Maica, Mayca, Mayka, Mari
- María del Mar = Marimar, Mar
- María del Rosario = Charo, Chari, Charito, Chayo
- María del Refugio = Cuca, Cuquis
- María del Socorro = Maricoco, Coco, Socorro
- María del Sol/María de la Soledad = Marisol, Sol, Sole, Sola, Chole, Chola
- María Engracia = Graci, Gracita
- María Elena = Malena, Marilena
- María Eugenia = Maru, Marugenia, Maruja, Yeni, Kena, Kenita
- María Fernanda = Mafe, Mafer, Marifer
- María Fuensanta = Mari Santi, Tanti, Fuen
- María Isabel = Maribel, Mabel, Marisabel, Marisa, Risa
- María José/María Josefa = Cote, Coté, Jose, Josefa, Mai, Ajo, Majo, Mariajo, Marijó, Marijose, Maripepa, Maripepi, Pepa, Pepi, Pepita
- María Laura = Malala
- María Luisa = Marisa, Mariluisa, Malu, Maluli, Magüi
- María Milagros = Mila, Milagritos, Mili, Mimi, Marimili
- María Paz = Maripaz, Paz, Pacita
- María Pilar/María del Pilar = Pilar, Pili, Mapi, Maripí, Maripili
- María Teresa = Maritere, Maite, Mayte, Teté, Mari, Mariate, Marité
- María Victoria = Mariví, Mavi
- Marina = Marita, Ina, Mari
- Mario = Marito, Mayito
- Marta = Martuqui, Tuqui
- Martina = Tina, China, Tinita
- Mauricio = Mau, Mauro, Mauri
- Máximo = Maxi, Max, Maximino, Mino
- Mayra = Mayrita, Mayris
- Mayola = May, Maya
- Melissa = Meli, Melo,
- Mercedes = Merce, Merche, Merchi, Merceditas, Meche, Meches, Mechas
- Micaela = Mica
- Miguel = Migue, Míchel, Miki
- Miguel Enrique = Ige, Ike, Mige, Mike, Migo, Miko
- Minerva = Mine, Míner
- Míriam = Miri
- Mónica = Moni, Mona, Nona, Mo, Niquita
- Montserrat = Monse, Montse, Moncha, Mon, Serrat, Cherra, Rat, Rateta, Tat or Tóna
- Natalia = Nati/Natis, Nata/Natas, Talia,
- Natividad = Nati, Tivi, Nava
- Néstor = Teto
- Nicanor = Cano, Nico, Nica, Niqui
- Nicolás = Nico, Coco, Colás
- Nicolasa = Nico, Nica, Colasa
- Norberto = Nórber, Berto, Bertín
- Norma = Normi, Normita, Tita
- Olimpo = Limpo, Limpio
- Oriana = Ori, Nana, Nanita, Ana, Anita
- Orlando = Lando
- Pablo = Pablete, Pablín, Pablito, Blete, Blin, Blito
- Pacificación = Paz
- Paloma = Palo
- Paola = Pao, Paolita, Payoya
- Paula = Pau
- Paulina = Pau, Pauli
- Patricia = Patri, Tricia, Pato, Pati
- Patricio = Pato, Patri
- Pedro = Perucho, Pedrito, Perico, Peyuco, Peret, Pedrín
- Pilar/María del Pilar = Pili, Pilarín, Piluca, Pilarica, Petita, Maripili
- Presentación = Presen
- Primitivo = Pivo, Tivo
- Purificación = Pura, Puri, Purita
- Rafael = Rafaelito, Rafa, Rafi, Rafita, Rafo, Fael, Falo, Fali, Felo, Fefo, Fefi
- Ramón = Mon, Moncho, Monche, Monchi, Mongo, Monguito, Ramoncito
- Raúl = Rauli, Raulito, Raulillo, Rul, Rulo, Rule, Ral, Rali
- Refugio = Cuca, Cuquita
- Reinaldo = Rey, Naldo
- Remedios = Reme
- Reposo = Repo
- Ricardo = Rica, Rícar, Richi, Rici, Rocho, Ríchar
- Roberto = Robe, Róber, Berto, Robertito, Tito, Beto
- Rocío = Roci, Chio, Ro, Roco
- Rodolfo = Fito, Fofo, Rodo, Bofo, Rudi
- Rodrigo = Rorro, Rodriguito, Rodri, Ruy, Roy, Ro
- Rogelio = Roge, Coque
- Rosalía = Chalia, Rosa, Rosi, Rosita
- Rosalva/Rosalba = Chava, Rosa
- Rosario = Charo, Chayo, Chayito, Rosa
- Salomé = Salo
- Salomón = Salo
- Salvador = Salva, Chava, Chavito, Chavita, Salvita, Salvi, Chavi, Salvidor
- Santiago = Santi, Yago, Diego, Chago, Tiago
- Sara = Sarita
- Sebastián = Sebas, Seba
- Serena = Sere, Siri
- Sergio = Chucho, Checo, Chejo, Checho, Chencho, Keko, Yeyo
- Simón = Monsi
- Sofía = Sofi, Fía
- Soledad = Sol, Sola, Solita, Sole, Chole, Chol
- Susana = Susi, Sus, Su, Susa, Chucha
- Teodoro = Teo, Doro
- Teófilo = Teo
- Teresa = Tere, Teresita, Teresica, Teresina
- Timoteo = Timo, Teo, Teín, Tín
- Trinidad = Trini, Trina
- Tomás = Tomi, Tomasito, Tomasín
- Valentina = Val, Vale, Valen, Tina, Tinita, Valentinita
- Valentino = Val, Vale, Valen, Tino, Tinito, Valente, Valentinito
- Verónica = Vero, Nica, Verito, Veru
- Vicente = Chente, Vicen, Vicho, Sento
- Víctor, Victorio = Vítor, Vis, Vico, Vito
- Victoria = Vico, Viqui, Vicky, Tori, Toria, Toya
- Visitación = Visi
- Xiomara = Xiomi, Chomi, Mara
- Yolanda = Yola, Yoyi, Yoli

== Spain's other languages ==
The official recognition of Spain's other written languages – Catalan, Basque, and Galician – legally allowed the autonomous communities to re-establish their vernacular social identity, including the legal use of personal names in the local languages and written traditions; these had been banned since 1938. This has sometimes been accomplished by re-spelling names to change Castilian Spanish forms into their original languages.

=== Basque names ===
The Basque-speaking territories (the Basque Autonomous Community and Navarre) follow Spanish naming customs (given names + two family names, the two family names being usually the father's and the mother's).

The given names are officially in one language or the other (Basque or Spanish), but often people use a translated or shortened version. A bilingual Basque-Spanish speaker will not necessarily bear a Basque name, and a monolingual Spanish speaker can use a Basque name or a Basque hypocoristic of an official Spanish name; e.g. a Francisco (official Spanish name) may be known as Patxi (Basque hypocoristic).

Some Basque-language names and surnames are foreign transliterations into the Basque tongue, e.g., Ander (English: "Andrew"; Spanish: Andrés), Mikel (English: "Michael"; Spanish: Miguel), or Ane (English: "Anne"; Spanish: Ana). In some cases, the name's original-language denotation is translated to Basque, e.g., Zutoia and Zedarri denote the Spanish Pilar (English: "Pillar"). Moreover, some originally Basque names, such as Xabier and Eneko (English "Xavier" and "Inigo"), have been transliterated into Spanish (Javier and Íñigo).

Recently, Basque names without a direct equivalent in other languages have become popular, e.g. Aitor (a legendary patriarch), Hodei ("cloud"), Iker ("to investigate"), and Amaia ("the end"). Some Basque names without a definable meaning in Spanish are unique to the Basque language, for instance, Eneko, Garikoitz, Urtzi. After Franco's death and the restoration of democracy in Spain, many Basque adults changed their Spanish names to their Basque equivalents, e.g. from Miguel to Mikel.

A source for modern Basque names is Sabino Arana's Deun-Ixendegi Euzkotarra ("Basque saint-name collection", published in 1910). Instead of the traditional Basque adaptations of Romance names, he proposed others he made up, and which in his opinion were truer to the originals and adapted better to Basque phonology. For example, his brother Luis became Koldobika, from Frankish Hlodwig. The traditional names Peru (from Spanish "Pedro"), Pello or Piarres (from French "Pierre"), all meaning "Peter", became Kepa from Aramaic כיפא (Kepha). He believed that the suffix -[n]e was inherently feminine, and new names like Nekane ("pain"+ne, "Dolores") or Garbiñe ("clean"+ne, "Immaculate [Conception]") are frequent among Basque females.

Basque surnames usually denote the paternal house (in its literal sense of a dwelling place) of the bearer; e.g. Etxebarria – "the new house", from etxe (house) + barri (new) + a (the), denotes "related to a farmhouse of that name"; in the same way, Garaikoetxea – "the house in the heights", garai ("height") + etxe ("house") + a (the). Sometimes, surnames denote not the house itself but a characteristic of the place, e.g. Saratxaga – "willow-place", from saratze ("willow") + -aga ("place of"); Loyola, from loi ("mud") + ola ("iron smithery"); Arriortua – "stone orchard", from harri ("stone") + ortua ("orchard"). Before the 20th century all Basque men were considered nobles (indeed, some Basque surnames, e.g. Irujo or Medoza, were related to some of the oldest Spanish noble families), and many of them used their status to emigrate with privileges to other regions of the Spanish Empire, especially the Americas; thus some Basque surnames became common in the Spanish-American world, e.g. Mendoza – "cold mountain", from mendi ("mountain") + hotza ("cold"); Salazar – "old hall", from sala ("hall") + zahar ("old"). Until 1978, Spanish was the single official language of the Spanish civil registries, and Basque surnames had to be registered according to the Spanish phonetical rules (for example, the Spanish "ch" sound merges the Basque "ts", "tx", and "tz", and someone whose surname in Standard Basque would be "Krutxaga" would have to write it as "Cruchaga", the letter "k" also not being used in Spanish). Although the restoration of democracy ended this policy and allowed surnames to be officially changed into their Basque orthography, surnames of Basque origin now often have more than one spelling, even within the same family: a father born before 1978 would be surnamed "Echepare" and his children, "Etxepare". This policy even changed the usual pronunciation of some Basque surnames. For instance, in Basque, the letter "z" maintained a sibilant "s"-like sound, while Spanish changed it; thus, a surname such as Zabala in Basque is properly read similar to "sabala" (Basque pronunciation: [s̻abala]), but in Spanish, where the "z" denotes a "th" sound ([θ]), it would be read as "Tha-bala" (Spanish pronunciation: [θaˈβala]). However, since the letter "z" exists in Spanish, the registries did not force the Zabalas to transliterate their surname.

In the Basque provinces of Biscay and Gipuzkoa, it was uncommon to take a surname from the place (town or village) where one resided, unless one was a foundling; in general, people bearing surnames such as Bilbao (after the Basque city of Bilbao) are descendants of foundlings. However, in the Basque province of Alava and, to a lesser extent, in Navarre, it was common to add one's birth village to the surname using the Spanish particle de to denote a toponymic, particularly when the surname was a common one; for instance, someone whose surname was Lopez and whose family was originally from the valley of Ayala could employ Lopez de Ayala as a surname. This latter practice is also common in Castile.

Basque compound surnames are relatively common, and were created by combining two discrete surnames, e.g. Elorduizapaterietxe – Elordui + Zapaterietxe, a practice denoting family allegiances or the equal importance of both families. Since compound surnames could themselves be used to create new compounds, this custom sometimes resulted in incredibly long surnames. For example, the longest surname recorded in Spain is the compound Basque name Burionagonatotoricagageazcoechea, formed by Buriona+ Gonatar + Totorika + Beazcoetxea.

Basque nationalist leader Sabino Arana pioneered a naming custom of transposing the name-surname order to what he thought was the proper Basque language syntax order; e.g. the woman named Miren Zabala would be referred to as Zabala'taŕ Miren – the surname first, plus the -tar suffix denoting "from a place", and then the name. Thus, Zabala'taŕ Miren means "Miren, of the Zabala family". The change in the order is effected because in the Basque language, declined words (such as Zabala'taŕ) that apply to a noun are placed before the noun itself; another example of this would be his pen name, Arana ta Goiri'taŕ Sabin. This Basque naming custom was used in nationalist literature; in formal official documents, the Castilian naming order is observed.

=== Catalan names ===
The Catalan-speaking territories mainly abide by Spanish naming customs, though discrete surnames are usually joined with the word i ("and") instead of the Spanish y; this practice is very common in formal contexts. For example, the former president of the Generalitat de Catalunya (Government of Catalonia) is formally called El Molt Honorable Senyor Pere Aragonès i Garcia. The national language policy enumerated in article 19.1 of Law 1/1998 stipulates that "the citizens of Catalonia have the right to use the proper regulation of their Catalan names and surnames and to introduce the conjunction between surnames".

The correction, translation, and change of surnames are regulated by the Registro Civil (Civil Registry) in decree 138/2007 of 26 June, modifying decree 208/1998 of 30 July, which regulates the accreditation of the linguistic correctness of names. Decree 138/2007 of 26 July regulates the issuance of language-correction certificates for translated Catalan names by the Institut d'Estudis Catalans (Institute of Catalan Studies) in Barcelona. Nevertheless, there are Catalan surnames that conform to neither the current spelling rules nor the traditionally correct Catalan spelling rules; a language-correction certification can be requested from the institute, for names such as these:

- Aleñá→Alenyà
- Caballé→Cavaller
- Cañellas→Canyelles
- Casas→Cases
- Corominas→Coromines
- Fábregas→Fàbregues
- Farré→Ferrer
- Figueras→Figueres
- Gabarra→Gavarra
- Gafarot→Gaferot
- Gumbau→Gombau
- Doménech→Domènec
- Jufré→Jofré
- Junqueras→Jonqueres
- Mayoral→Majoral
- Montañà→Montanyà
- Perpiñán→Perpinyà
- Pijuan→Pijoan
- Piñol→Pinyol
- Puyol→Pujol
- Roselló→Rosselló
- Rusiñol→Rossinyol
- Tarradellas→Tarradelles
- Viñallonga→Vinyallonga
- Viñes→Vinyes

==== Catalan hypocoristics and nicknames ====
Many Catalan names are shortened to hypocoristic forms using only the final portion of the name (unlike Spanish, which mostly uses only the first portion of the name), and with a diminutive suffix (-et, -eta/-ita). Thus, shortened Catalan names taking the first portion of the name are probably influenced by the Spanish tradition. The influence of Spanish in hypocoristics is recent since it became a general fashion only in the twentieth century and especially since Francisco Franco's dictatorship; example Catalan names are:

- Antoni/Antònia = Toni, Tònia, Tonet/a
- Bartomeu = Tomeu
- Concepció = Concep, Ció
- Cristina = Cris, Cristi, Tina
- Dolors = Lloll, Dolo, Loles
- Elisabet/h = Bet, Beth, Eli, Lis
- Eulàlia = Laia, Olaia, Lali
- Francesc/a = Cesc, Quico/a, Xesco/a, Xisco/a, Cisco/a, Sisquet/a
- Gabriel = Biel
- Helena = Lena
- Ignasi = Igna, Nasi
- Isabel = Bel, Bet
- Jacint = Cinto
- Joaquim/a = Quim/a, Ximo/a (in Valencia)
- Jordi = Toti
- Jordina = Jordi
- Josefina = Fina, Fineta
- Josep Maria = Pemi
- Josep/a = Pep/o/a, Pepet/a, Pepito/a
- Magdalena = Talena, Magda
- Manel = Nel, Nelo, Nel·lo
- Maria del Mar = Mar, Marimar
- Maria dels Àngels = Mariàngels, Àngels, Màngels
- Maria Lluïsa = Marissa
- Maria Soletat = Marissol
- Mariona = Ona, Miona
- Meritxell = Txell, Meri
- Montserrat = Serrat, Montse, Munsa, Muntsa
- Narcís/isa = Narciset/a, Ciset/a, Ciso/a
- Núria = Nuri
- Onofre = Nofre
- Oriol = Uri
- Rafel = Fel, Feló, Rafa
- Salvador = Salva, Vadó, Voro (in Valencia)
- Sebastià/ana = Tià/ana, Sebas
- Sergi = Keki, Xexi
- Vicent = Vicentó, Cento, Cinto
- Xavier = Xavi, Xevi, Javi (the J is pronounced as in English)

=== Galician names ===
The Galician-speaking areas also abide by the Spanish naming customs. The main differences are the usage of Galician given names and surnames.

==== Galician surnames ====
Most Galician surnames have their origin in local toponymies, including Galician regions (Salnés < Salnés, Carnota, Bergantiños), towns (Ferrol, Noia), parishes or villages (as Andrade). Just like elsewhere, many surnames were also generated from jobs or professions (Carpinteiro 'carpenter', Cabaleiro 'Knight', Ferreiro 'Smith', Besteiro 'Crossbowman'), physical characteristics (Gago 'Twangy', Tato 'Stutterer', Couceiro 'Tall and thin', Bugallo 'fat', Pardo 'Swarthy'), or origin of the person (Franco and Francés 'French', Portugués 'Portuguese').

Although many Galician surnames have historically been adapted to Spanish phonetics and orthography, they are still clearly recognizable as Galician words: Freijedo, Spanish adaptation of freixedo 'place with ash-trees'; Seijo from seixo 'stone'; Doval from do Val 'of the Valley'; Rejenjo from Reguengo, Galician evolution of local Latin-Germanic word Regalingo 'Royal property'.

Specially relevant are the Galician surnames that originated from medieval patronymics, present in local documentation since the 9th century, and popularized from the 12th century on. Although many of them were historically adapted to Spanish orthography, phonetics and traditions, many are still characteristically Galician; the most common ones are:

- Alonso (medieval form Afonso, from the latinicized Germanic name Adefonsus).
- Álvarez (from medieval Alvares, from the Germanic name Halvar(d), latinicized as Alvarus).
- Ares (from the name Arias or the town of Ares).
- Bermúdez (medieval form Vermues, from the latinicized Germanic name Veremodus + suffix -ici-).
- Bernárdez (from the Frankish name Bernard + suffix -ici-).
- Vieitez, Vieites (from the name Bieito, from Latin Benedictus + suffix -ici-).
- Diz, Díaz (from the name Didacus + suffix -ici-).
- Domínguez (medieval form Domingues, derived of the name Domingo, from Dominicus, + suffix -ici-).
- Enríquez (medieval form Anrriques, from the Frankish name Henric + suffix -ici-).
- Estévez (medieval form Esteves, from the name Estevo, derived of Stephanus + suffix -ici-).
- Fernández (medieval form Fernandes, from the name Fernando, derived from the Germanic name Fredenandus + suffix -ici-).
- Froiz (medieval form Froaz, from the Germanic name Froila 'Lord' + suffix -ici-).
- García (medieval form Garçia, from the name Garcia).
- Giance (from the name Xian, old orthography Jiam, derived of Latin Iulianus + suffix -ici-).
- Gómez (medieval form Gomes, from the name Gomes).
- González (medieval form Gonçalves, from the latinicized Germanic name Gundisalvus + suffix -ici-).
- López (medieval form Lopes, from the Latin nickname Lupus 'wolf').
- Lourenzo, Lorenzo (medieval form Lourenço, from the Latin name Laurentius).
- Martínez, Martín, Martís (from the Latin name Martinus + suffix -ici-).
- Méndez (medieval form Meendes, from the name Mendo, from Menendus + suffix -ici-).
- Miguéns (from the name Miguel, derived of Michael + suffix -ici-).
- Núñez (medieval form Nunes, derived from the name Nunnus + suffix -ici-).
- Paz, Paes, Pais (from the name Paio, derived from Pelagius + suffix -ici-).
- Pérez (medieval form Peres, from the name Pero, derived of Petrus, + suffix -ici-).
- Raimúndez (from the Frankish name Raimund + suffix -ici-).
- Rodríguez (from the name Rodrigo, from the latinicized Germanic form Rodericus + suffix -ici-).
- Rois (from the name Roi, nickname of Rodrigo + suffix -ici-): Spanish 'Ruiz'.
- Sánchez (medieval form Sanches, from the name Sancho, derived from Latin Sanctius + suffix -ici-).
- Sueiro, Suárez (medieval forms Sueiro, Suares, from the name Suarius, with and without suffix -ici-).
- Vázquez (medieval form Vasques, from the name Vasco, from Velasco, + suffix -ici-).
- Yanes (medieval forms Eanes, Ianes. from Iohannes, Yohannes + suffix -ici-).

Some of them (namely Páez, Méndez, Vázquez) show characteristic Galician dropping of intervocalic -l-, -d-, -g- and -n- (although Lugo is the only province in Spain with a plurality of people surnamed López).

==== Galician given names and nicknames ====
Some common Galician names are:

- Afonso [m]: nicknames Fonso, Pocho.
- Alberte [m] Alberta [f]: Berto, Berta.
- Alexandre [m]: Xandre, Álex.
- Anxo [m]: Xeluco.
- Antón [m], Antía [f]: Tonecho.
- Artai [m].
- Baldomero [m]: Mero
- Bieito [m], Bieita [f]
- Brais [m]
- Brandán [m], Brenda [f] (Celtic origin, "distinguished warrior)
- Carme [f]: Carmiña, Mela, Carmela, Carmucha, Carmuxa.
- Catarina [f]: Catuxa.
- Cibrao,Cibrán [m] (Greek origin meaning "Cypriot")
- Edelmiro, Delmiro [m]: Edel, Miro.
- Estevo [m]
- Fernán [m]
- Francisco [m]: Farruco, Fran.
- Iago [m]
- Icía [f]
- Iria [f]
- Lois [m]: Sito
- Lúa [f] (moon)
- María [f]: Maruxa, Marica.
- Manuel, Manoel [m]: Manolo, Lolo.
- Olalla, Baia [f]
- Paio [m]
- Paulo [m], Paula [f]
- Roi [m]
- Sabela [f]: Beluca
- Tareixa [f]
- Tomé [m]
- Uxío [m] Uxía [f]
- Xavier [m]
- Xacobe [m]
- Xaquín [m]: Xocas.
- Xela [f]
- Xián [m]
- Xoán, Xan [m]
- Xosé [m]: Che, Pepe.
- Xurxo [m]

Nicknames are usually obtained from the end of a given name, or through derivation. Common suffixes include masculine -iño, -ito (as in Sito, from Luisito), -echo (Tonecho, from Antonecho) and -uco (Farruco, from Francisco); and feminine -iña, -ucha/uxa (Maruxa, Carmucha, from Maria and Carme), -uca (Beluca, from Isabeluca), and -ela (Mela, from Carmela).

=== Ceuta and Melilla ===
As the provincial Surname distribution map (above) indicates, Mohamed is an often-occurring surname in the autonomous Mediterranean North African cities of Ceuta and Melilla (respectively registered 10,410 and 7,982 occurrences), Hispanophone Muslims use the Spanish "Mohamed" spelling for "Muhammad". As such, it is often a component of Arabic names for men; hence, many Ceutan and Melillan Muslims share surnames despite not sharing a common ancestry. Furthermore, Mohamed (Muhammad) is the most popular name for new-born boys, thus it is not unusual to encounter a man named Mohamed Mohamed Mohamed: the first occurrence is the given name, the second occurrence is the paternal surname, and the third occurrence is the maternal surname.

== Indexing ==
In English, the Chicago Manual of Style recommends that Spanish and Hispanophone names be indexed by the family name. When there are two family names, the indexing is done under the father's family name; this would be the first element of the surname if the father's and mother's or husband's family names are joined by a y. Depending upon the person involved, the particle de may be treated as a part of a family name or it may be separated from a family name. The indexing of Hispanophone names differs from that of Portuguese or Lusophone names, where the final element of the name is indexed because the Portuguese custom is for the father's surname to follow, rather than precede, the mother's. The effect is that the father's surname is the one indexed for both Spanish and Portuguese names.

== See also ==
- List of personal naming conventions (for other languages)
- List of common Spanish surnames
- Naming customs of Hispanic America
- Portuguese names
- Basque surnames
- Filipino names
- French names
- Romani people in Spain
- Maiden and married names
- Name for general coverage of the topic
- Nobiliary particle
