= List of common Spanish surnames =

Lists of the most common Spanish surnames

These are the lists of the most common Spanish surnames in Spain and Hispanic America. The surnames for each section are listed in numerically descending order, or from most popular to least popular.

== Spain ==
List of the most common Surnames in Spain.

1. García – 1,378,000 people (3.48%) Pre-Roman, Basque.
2. Fernández – 851,000 (2.15%) Son of Fernando; Germanic
3. González – 839,000 (2.12%) Son of Gonzalo, from the Latinised form Gundisalvus; Germanic
4. Rodríguez – 804,000 (2.03%) Son of Rodrigo, Roderic; Germanic
5. López – 796,000 (2.01%) Son of Lope, Latin Lupus, meaning wolf
6. Martínez – 788,000 (1.97%) Son of Martín, Son of Martino, Latin Martis, genitive form of Mars
7. Sánchez – 725,000 (1.83%) Son of Sancho, Latin Sanctius
8. Pérez – 709,000 (1.79%) Son of Pedro, Latin Petrus
9. Martín – 459,000 (1.16%)
10. Gómez – 440,000 (1.11%) Son of Gomes, Gomo, or Gomaro; Germanic
11. Ruiz – 321,000 (0.81%) Son of Ruy, variation or short for Rodrigo
12. Hernández – 305,000 (0.77%) Son of Hernando, variation of Fernando
13. Jiménez – 293,000 (0.74%) Son of Jimeno, Xemeno, or Ximeno
14. Díaz – 293,000 (0.74%) Son of Diego
15. Álvarez – 273,000 (0.69%) Son of Álvaro, from Alvar; Germanic
16. Moreno – 261,000 (0.66%) Brown-haired, tanned, brunet
17. Muñoz – 241,000 (0.61%) Son of Munio; Pre-Roman
18. Alonso – 206,000 (0.52%) Variation of Alfonso; Germanic
19. Gutiérrez – 170,000 (0.43%) Son of Gutier, Gutierre, or Gualtierre; Germanic
20. Romero – 170,000 (0.43%) (pilgrim) (can also be Italian in origin)
21. Navarro – 158,400 (0.40%) Navarrese, "from Navarre"; toponym
22. Torres – 134,600 (0.34%) Towers; toponym
23. Domínguez – 134,600 (0.34%) Son of Domingo, from Latin Domenicus, Dominus, "master"
24. Gil – 134,600 (0.34%) From older form Egidio; patronymic
25. Vázquez – 130,000 (0.33%) Son of Vasco or Velasco
26. Serrano – 122,700 (0.31%) "Highlander"
27. Ramos – 118,000 (0.30%) Branches; meaning born during Christian festivity Palm Sunday
28. Blanco – 118,000 (0.30%) "White"
29. Sanz – 106,900 (0.27%)
30. Castro – 102,900 (0.26%) "castle, fort, village". See castro and castrum
31. Suárez – 102,900 (0.26%) Son of Suero or Suaro; unknown origin
32. Ortega – 99,000 (0.25%) From Ortiga, nettle plant
33. Rubio – 99,000 (0.25%) Blond, fair-haired; Latin Rubeus, meaning ruddy, reddish
34. Molina – 99,000 (0.25%) (Mill, place with mills)
35. Delgado – 95,000 (0.24%) "Thin man"
36. Ramírez – 95,000 (0.24%) Son of Ramiro, Radamir, or Radmir; Germanic
37. Morales – 95,000 (0.24%) Blackberry groves
38. Ortiz – 87,120 (0.22%) Son of Orti; from Basque Ortún, from Latin Fortis, meaning strong one, or Latin Fortunius, meaning fortunate one
39. Marín - 83,160 (0.21%) Latin Marinus, meaning marine
40. Iglesias – 83,160 (0.21%) "Churches"

Source: – Data from December 1999. (2004 data confirmation of top 25)

== Mexico ==
List of the most common surnames in Mexico:

1. Hernández – 5,526,929
2. García – 4,129,360
3. Martínez – 3,886,887
4. González – 3,188,693
5. López – 3,148,024
6. Rodríguez – 2,744,179
7. Pérez – 2,746,468
8. Sánchez – 2,234,625
9. Ramírez – 2,070,723
10. Flores – 1,392,707 – From Asturias meaning "Flowers"
11. Gómez – 989,295
12. Torres – 841,966
13. Díaz – 811,553
14. Vásquez – 806,894
15. Cruz – 800,874 – From Castile meaning "Cross"
16. Morales – 771,796
17. Gutiérrez – 748,789
18. Reyes – 738,320 – Meaning either "Kings" or "Royalty"
19. Ruíz – 708,718
20. Jiménez – 670,453 – From Basque
21. Mendoza – 613,683 – From Basque meaning "Mountain"
22. Aguilar – 611,904 – Meaning eagles nest, from Latin aquilare 'haunt of eagles'
23. Ortíz – 576,989 – From Basque or Latin, Son of Orti
24. Álvarez – 557,332
25. Castillo – 553,799 – Meaning "Castle"
26. Romero – 540,922 – Can be either Spanish or Italian, and have multiple meanings.
27. Moreno – 539,927
28. Chávez – 517,392 – From Portuguese and Galician, from various places by the name, places derive name from Latin clavis “keys” or aquis Flaviis “at the waters of Flavius”
29. Rivera – 508,022 – Meaning either "Riverbank" or "Roadside"
30. Ramos – 455,728
31. Herrera – 451,226 – From the Latin word ferrāria, meaning either "Iron Mine" or "Iron Works".
32. Medina – 431,518 – From the Arabic word madina, meaning city.
33. Vargas – 427,854 – From Spanish and Portuguese, from various places called Vargas, meaning variously "thatched hut", "steep slope", or "fenced pastureland which becomes waterlogged in winter".
34. Castro – 419,216 – Meaning "village" especially the “hill forts” of the Galician area
35. Méndez – 410,239 – Son of Mendo
36. Guzmán – 392,284 – From Burgos
37. Fernández – 385,741 – Son of Fernando
38. Juárez – 384,929 – Regional variant of Suárez, meaning swineherd, from Latin suerius
39. Muñoz – 376,633 – Son of Muño
40. Ortega – 372,471
41. Salazar – 368,231 – From Burgos, meaning in Basque "Old hall"
42. Rojas – 365,457 – From various places in Burgos or Lugo called Rojas, meaning "red"
43. Guerrero – 361,557 – Meaning "Warrior"
44. Contreras – 358,521 – "from the surrounding area", toponymic
45. Luna – 357,578 – Can be any of Spanish, Italian, and Romanian, meaning "Moon".
46. Domínguez – 348,182 - Son of Domingo, from Latin Domenicus, Dominus, "master"
47. Garza – 335,829 – From Basque and Galician, Spanish meaning "heron", used as a descriptor or as part of a place name.
48. Velásquez – 331,510 – Son of Velasco
49. Estrada – 324,103 – From various places called Estrada, meaning "road", from Latin stata "via" denoting a paved way.
50. Soto – 306,227 – From various places called Soto, meaning "grove" or "small wood", from Latin saltus
51. Cortez – 301,954 – Incorrect spelling of Cortés, meaning "courteous" or "polite"

== Hispanophone Caribbean ==
=== Cuba ===
List of the most common surnames in Cuba:

1. Rodríguez – 301,136
2. Pérez – 300,189
3. González – 262,311
4. Hernández – 215,593
5. García – 208,965
6. Martinez – 148,674
7. Diaz – 136,364
8. Fernández – 134,470
9. López – 127,525
10. Álvarez – 101,010

=== Dominican Republic ===
List of the most common surnames in the Dominican Republic:

1. Rodríguez – 225,321
2. Pérez – 158,059
3. Martínez – 141,259
4. García – 137,124
5. Reyes – 104,892
6. Sánchez – 104,392
7. Díaz – 95,106
8. Peña – 94,396
9. Jiménez – 92,978
10. Ramírez – 92,863
11. Hernández – 91,080
12. Rosario – 89,630
13. González – 85,757
14. Santana – 81,973
15. Núñez – 79,374
16. Castillo – 78,338
17. De la Cruz – 76,977 – Meaning "Of the Cross"
18. Cruz – 64,613
19. Guzmán – 63,073
20. Gómez – 62,310
21. Santos – 60,613 – A name of Christian origins, meaning "Saints".
22. López – 59,566
23. Fuentes – 58,518 – Meaning "Fountains".
24. Vásquez – 56,149

=== Puerto Rico ===
List of the most common surnames in Puerto Rico:

1. Sanchez - 128,384
2. Rivera - 114,777
3. Diaz - 107,640
4. Rodriguez- 102,137
5. Narvaez - 70,764
6. Burgos - 68,522
7. Colón - 64,692
8. Vázquez - 62,659
9. Ramos - 60,232
10. Ortiz - 60,231
11. Morales - 56,574
12. Betancourt - 53,974
13. Cruz - 52,117
14. Santiago - 51,371
15. Reyes - 48,780
16. Perez - 48,461

== Other Hispanic American countries ==
=== Guatemala ===
List of the most common surnames in Guatemala:

1. Lopez - 371,525
2. Garcia - 285,670
3. Morales - 228,167
4. Hernández - 222,755
5. Pérez - 209,963
6. González - 208,795
7. Rodríguez - 135,978
8. De León - 134,010
9. Martínez - 123,186
10. Castillo - 116,298
11. Estrada - 115,252
12. Marroquín - 113,961
13. Gómez - 110,824
14. Vásquez - 102,153
15. Méndez - 98,462
16. Reyes - 95,449

== See also ==
- Spanish naming customs
- Naming customs of Hispanic America
