= Burgos (surname) =

Burgos is a Spanish surname that originates from the Spanish city of Burgos, the capital of old Castile.

== People ==
- Ambiorix Burgos (born 1984), Major League Baseball player
- Carl Burgos (1918–1984), American comic book and advertising artist
- Dag Burgos (born 1966), Guatemalan Olympic cross-country skier
- Enrique Burgos (baseball, born 1990), Panamanian baseball player
- Francisco de Burgos Mantilla (1612–1672), Spanish painter
- Germán Burgos (born 1969), Argentinian football player
- Javier de Burgos (1778–1848), Spanish writer and politician
- José Burgos (1837–1872), a Spanish-Filipino priest
- Julia de Burgos (1914–1953), Puerto Rican poet and civil-rights activist
- Kike Burgos (born 1971), Spanish football player
- Rafael Frühbeck de Burgos, Spanish conductor and composer
- Raymond Burgos (born 1998), Puerto Rican baseball player
- Renata Burgos (born 1982), Brazilian freestyle swimmer
- Ricardo Burgos (born 1965), Guatemalan Olympic cross-country skier
- Shane Burgos, UFC Fighter
