= Enrique Burgos =

Enrique Burgos may refer to:

- Enrique Burgos (baseball, born 1965), Panamanian baseball player
- Enrique Burgos (baseball, born 1990), Panamanian baseball player
- Enrique Burgos García (born 1946), Mexican politician
- Enrique Burgos Varas (1882–1957), Chilean politician
- Kike Burgos (born 1971), born Enrique Burgos Carrasco, Spanish footballer
