= Enrique Burgos García =

Mexican politician (born 1946)

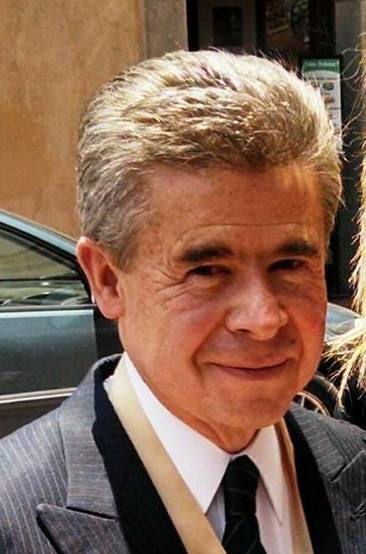

Governor of Querétaro
- In office 1991–1997

Personal details
- Born: 20 April 1946 (age 80) Querétaro, Querétaro, Mexico
- Party: PRI
- Occupation: Politician

Enrique Burgos García (Note: In this Mexican name, the surname is Burgos and the second or maternal family name is García.) (born 20 April 1946) is a Mexican politician affiliated with the Institutional Revolutionary Party (PRI). He served as a senator for Querétaro in the 62nd Congress from 2012 to 2015. He previously served as Governor of Querétaro between 1991 and 1997, and as a plurinominal member of the Chamber of Deputies during the 59th Congress (2003 to 2006).

== Biography ==
He has served as Governor of Querétaro, Director of DIF, mayor of San Juan del Río, and federal deputy. He served as a senator for the state of Querétaro as a member of the PRI, and as vice-chair of the Board.

Today, he is a columnist for the newspaper El Universal and its affiliates since 1998 and author of Our Constitution Every Day (2007), a compilation of articles published between 1998 and 2004. He serves as national adviser also of the Mexican Red Cross. As an attorney, he is head of the Public Notary Office No. 3 in San Juan del Río, Querétaro.
