= Jaú =

- Municipality
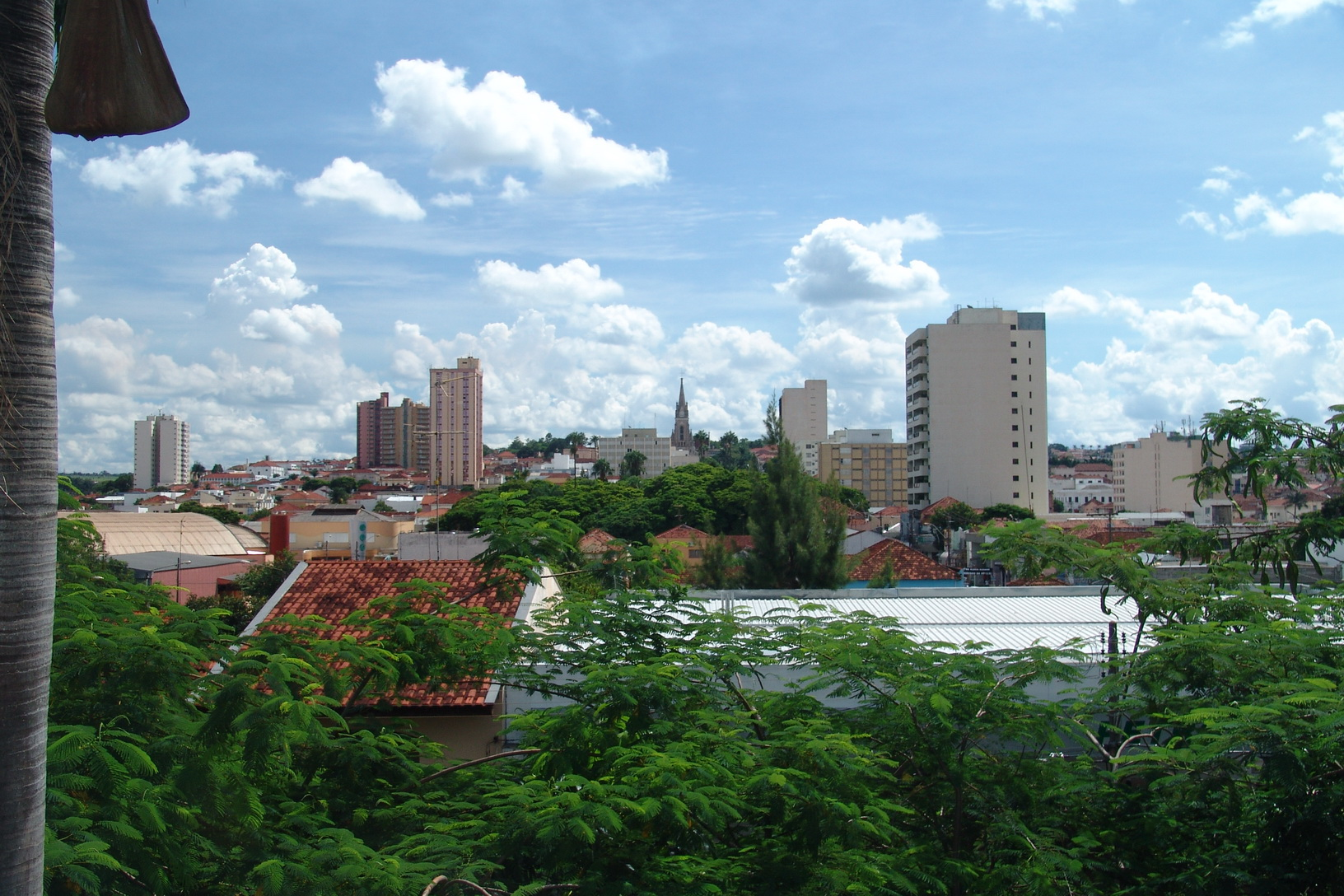

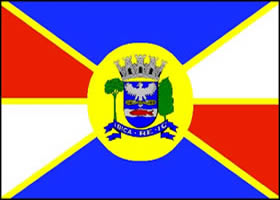
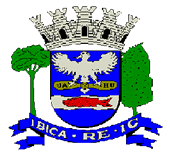
- Flag Coat of arms

- Location in São Paulo state

- Location in Brazil
- Coordinates: 22°17′45″S 48°33′28″W
- Country: Brazil
- Region: Southeast
- State: São Paulo

Government
  - Mayor: Jorge Ivan Cassaro (2021–2024) (PSD)

Area
  - Total: 687 km^{2} (265 sq mi)
- Elevation: 541 m (1,775 ft)

Population (2022 Census)
  - Total: 133,497
  - Estimate (2025): 137,409
  - Density: 194/km^{2} (503/sq mi)
- Time zone: UTC– 03:00 (BRT)
  - Summer (DST): UTC– 02:00 (BRST)
- Website: www.jau.sp.gov.br

Jaú is a city and municipality in the center of the state of São Paulo, in Brazil. The population is 151,881 (2020 est.) in an area of 687 square kilometres (265 sq mi). The elevation is 522 metres (1,713 ft). The city takes its name from the native fish species jau.

== History ==
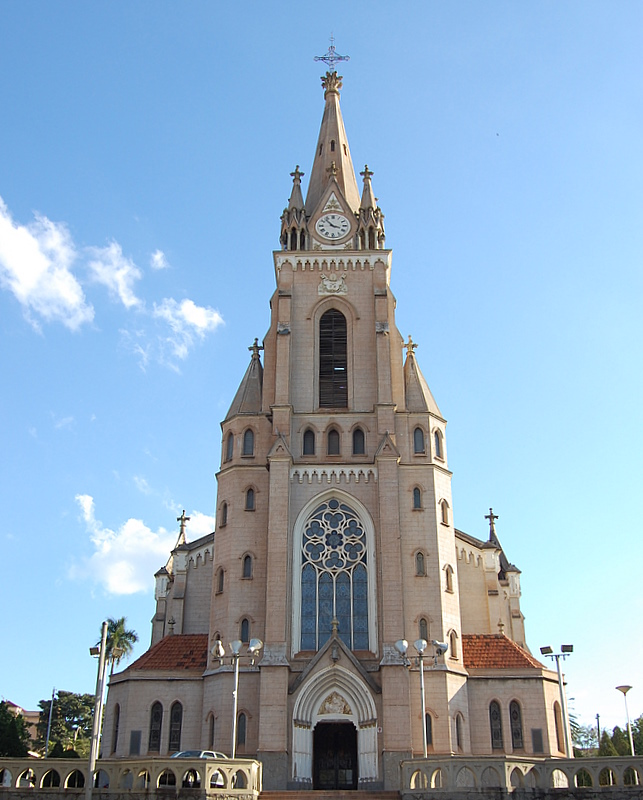
Our Lady of Patrocínio Church, in Jaú

The history of the city goes back to 1853, when a group of people decided to settle and found a village. Not until 1889, however, did it achieve the status of town. Its most widely known inhabitant is João Ribeiro de Barros, the first man to travel from Europe to South America by plane, in 1927, 23 days before Charles Lindbergh's flight.

== Economy ==
Jaú is located in a tropical weather region, known for its very fertile lands, which were once called "terra roxa" (purple land). The city is known as the national capital of female shoes, which are exported to the whole world.

== Sports ==
Esporte Clube XV de Novembro is a traditional sport club of the town, founded in 1924. The club plays its home matches at Estádio Zezinho Magalhães. Jaú is also the birthplace of freestyle swimmer Renata Burgos, who represented Brazil at the 2004 Summer Olympics in Athens, Greece.

=== Polibol ===
The city is the birthplace of polibol, a court game created in 1980 by physical education teacher Fernão de Toledo Castro. Based on the philosophy of judo, polibol combines fundamentals of handball, futsal, basketball, dodgeball and volleyball. It is played on a multi-sports court by two teams of six players each, including a goalkeeper, and the goal is to score points through goals, baskets and dodgeball. Polibol is currently implemented in municipal, state and private schools in Jaú, and is practiced in other regions of São Paulo and in other states, such as Rio de Janeiro, Pernambuco, Paraná and Rio Grande do Sul. In 2018, it was recognized by the Panathlon Internacional Jaú – Distrito Brasil as a sport focused on Fair Play. In 2019, it became a Cultural heritage of Jahu, by Legislative Law No. 5262 of 6 November 2019.

== Media ==
In telecommunications, the city was served by Companhia Telefônica Brasileira until 1973, when it began to be served by Telecomunicações de São Paulo. In July 1998, this company was acquired by Telefónica, which adopted the Vivo brand in 2012.

The company is currently an operator of cell phones, fixed lines, internet (fiber optics/4G) and television (satellite and cable).

== See also ==
- List of municipalities in São Paulo
