= Hodei =

Male given name

- Gender: Male
- Language: Basque

Origin
- Meaning: cloud
- Region of origin: Basque Country

Other names
- Related names: Odei

Hodei is a Basque masculine given name meaning "cloud". It is also related to Odei, a spirit in Basque mythology.

== People ==
- Hodei Alutiz (born 2003), Spanish footballer
- Hodei Arrillaga (born 2004), Spanish footballer
- Hodei Mazquiarán Uría (born 2008), Spanish track cyclist
