= Odei =

In Basque mythology, Odei, also known as Hodei, is a spirit of thunder and the personification of storm clouds.
