= Garbiñe =

Garbiñe is a Spanish Basque female given name. Notable people with the name include:

- Garbiñe Abasolo (born 1964), first Miss Spain from the Basque region, crowned in 1983
- Garbiñe Muguruza (born 1993), Spanish-Venezuelan tennis player
