= Ricardo Burgos =

Guatemalan cross-country skier (born 1965)

Personal information
- Full name: Ricardo Burgos Spangen
- Nationality: Guatemalan
- Born: 4 March 1965 (age 60)

Sport
- Sport: Cross-country skiing

Ricardo Burgos Spangen (born 4 March 1965) is a Guatemalan cross-country skier. With his brother Dag Burgos, they would compete for Guatemala at the 1988 Winter Olympics in the cross-country skiing events.

== Biography ==
Ricardo Burgos Spangen was born on 4 March 1965. His younger brother is fellow cross-country skier Dag Burgos. They were born to a Norwegian mother named Bertha and studied in Norway.

Guatemala would compete at the 1988 Winter Olympics in Calgary, Canada, for their first appearance at the Winter Games. Ricardo and his brother would compete and represent the nation at these Games, competing in two cross-country skiing events at the Canmore Nordic Centre Provincial Park.

Both of them would first compete in the men's 30 kilometre classical event on 15 February 1988 in a field of 90 competing athletes. There, Ricardo would place 83rd out of the 87 competitors that completed the course. He would finish with a time of 1:51:19.4, 26:53.1 away from winner Alexey Prokurorov of the Soviet Union. He would then compete in the men's 15 kilometre classical event four days later on 19 February 1988 in a field of 90 competing athletes. There, Burgos would place 81st out of the 85 competitors that completed the course. He would finish with a time of 55:16.3, placing just behind his brother. The winner of the event would be Mikhail Devyatyarov of the Soviet Union who had finished with a time of 41:18.9.
