= Dag Burgos =

Guatemalan cross-country skier (born 1965)

Personal information
- Full name: Dag René Burgos Spangen
- Nationality: Guatemalan
- Born: 21 October 1966 (age 58)

Sport
- Sport: Cross-country skiing

Dag René Burgos Spangen (born 21 October 1966) is a Guatemalan cross-country skier. With his brother Ricardo Burgos, they would compete for Guatemala at the 1988 Winter Olympics in the cross-country skiing events.

== Biography ==
Dag René Burgos Spangen was born on 21 October 1966. His older brother is fellow cross-country skier Ricardo Burgos. They were born to a Norwegian mother named Bertha and studied in Norway.

Guatemala would compete at the 1988 Winter Olympics in Calgary, Canada, for their first appearance at the Winter Games. Dag and his brother would compete and represent the nation at these Games, competing in two cross-country skiing events at the Canmore Nordic Centre Provincial Park.

Both of them would first compete in the men's 30 kilometre classical event on 15 February 1988 in a field of 90 competing athletes. There, Dag would place 80th out of the 87 competitors that completed the course. He would finish with a time of 1:47:38.5, 23:12.2 away from winner Alexey Prokurorov of the Soviet Union. He would then compete in the men's 15 kilometre classical event four days later on 19 February 1988 in a field of 90 competing athletes. There, Dag would place 80th out of the 85 competitors that completed the course. He would finish with a time of 53:00.8, placing just above his brother. The winner of the event would be Mikhail Devyatyarov of the Soviet Union who had finished with a time of 41:18.9.
