= Francisco de Burgos Mantilla =

Spanish artist (1612–1672)

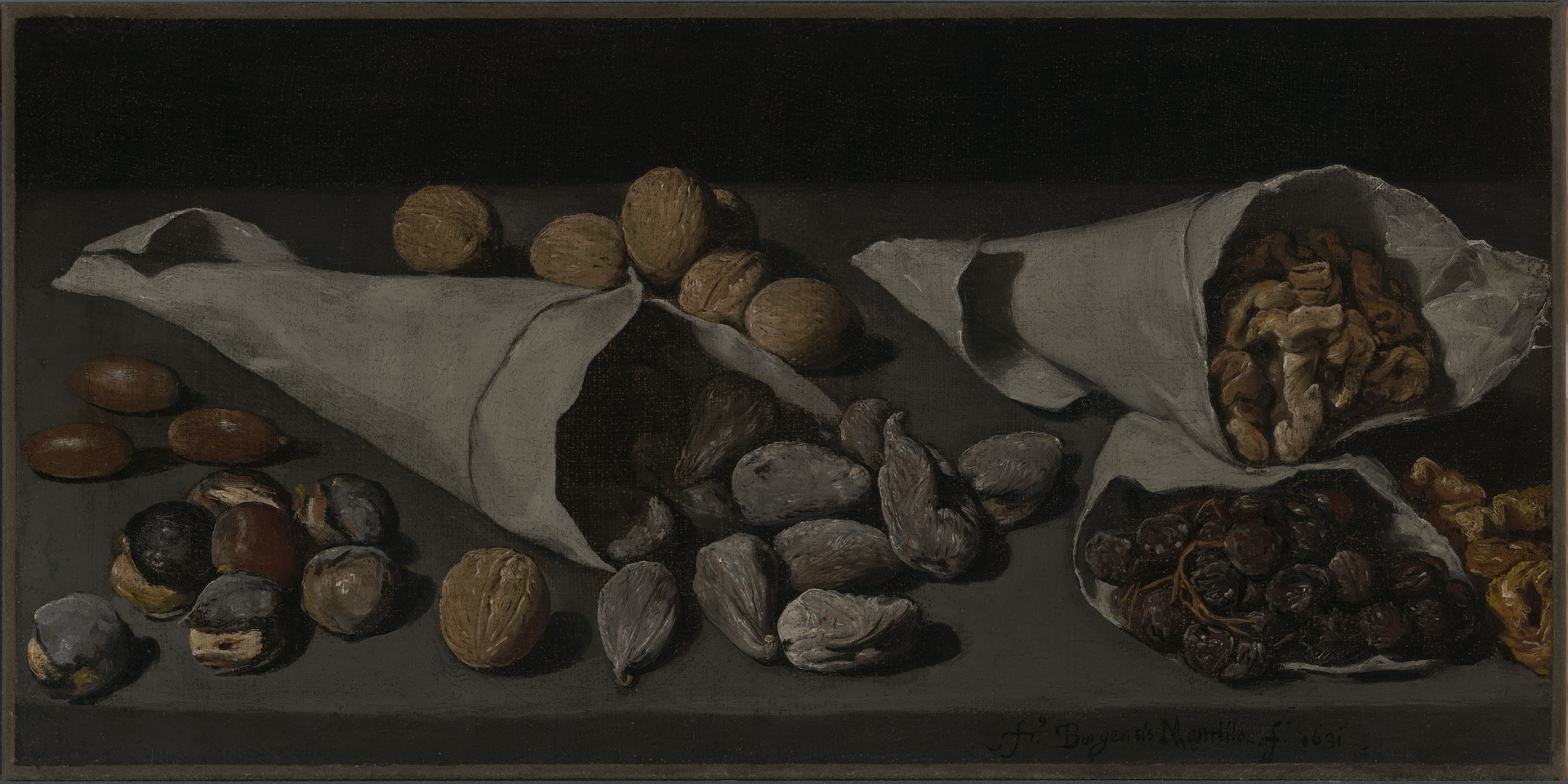
Still Life with Dried Fruit (1631)

Francisco de Burgos Mantilla (1609 or 1612 – April 1, 1672) was a Spanish Baroque painter of portraits and still lifes.

He was born in Burgos but from 1618 he lived in Madrid, where he had his first artistic training under Pedro de las Cuevas. In 1624 he became a pupil of Diego Velázquez. Although in his lifetime he was best known for his portraits, all of them are now lost. He died in Madrid in 1672.

The only work by Burgos Mantilla known to survive is the Still Life with Dried Fruit (1631), now in the collection of Yale University Art Gallery, New Haven, Connecticut. This small bodegón, which is signed and dated, is reminiscent in its subdued colors and naturalistic composition to the work of the Italian followers of Caravaggio. On the basis of stylistic similarity a second, unsigned still life (Bodegon, Museo del Prado) has also been attributed to him.
