= Renata Burgos =

Brazilian swimmer (born 1982)

Personal information
- Full name: Renata de Oliveira Burgos
- Nationality: Brazil
- Born: January 3, 1982 (age 44) Jaú, São Paulo, Brazil
- Height: 1.69 m (5 ft 7 in)
- Weight: 65 kg (143 lb)

Sport
- Sport: Swimming
- Strokes: Freestyle
Medal record
Women's swimming
Representing Brazil

Renata de Oliveira Burgos (born January 3, 1982, in Jaú, São Paulo) is a freestyle swimmer from Brazil. She represented her native country in the women's 4×100-metre freestyle relay at the 2004 Summer Olympics in Athens, Greece, finishing 12th and breaking the South American record with a time of 3:45.38. She's as resident of Ribeirão Preto.

Participating in the 2006 Pan Pacific Swimming Championships, in Victoria, Burgos finished 10th in the 50-metre freestyle, 40th in the 100-metre freestyle, and 45th in the 200-metre freestyle.

== Doping Suspension ==
Tested positive for the substance Stanozolol and given a two-year suspension by the Brazilian Swimming Confederation commencing December 14, 2006. She was guaranteed in 2007 World Aquatics Championships, and would participate in the 2007 Pan American Games. Burgos was caught after a test conducted during the Brazilian Championship, in December 2006, when she won the gold medal in the 50-metre freestyle with the best time of her career: 25.56 seconds.

== Return ==
Burgos returned to swimming in 2009. In 2011, would participate in decision-time for vacancy for the 2011 Pan American Games and 2011 World Aquatics Championships, however, she contracted dengue and got no vacancy in these competitions.
