= 2027 Nuevo León elections =

- 6 June 2027
- Opinion polls
- Gubernatorial election
Governor before election
Samuel García
MC
Elected Governor
TBD
- Congress of Nuevo León
- All 42 seats in the Congress of Nuevo León; 22 seats needed for a majority
Party	Leader	Current seats
PAN	Policarpo Flores	10
MC	Baltazar Gilberto Martínez Ríos	10
MORENA	Anabel del Roble Alcocer Cruz	9
PRI	José Luis Garza Ochoa	8
PVEM	Edgar Salvatierra	1
PT	Guadalupe Rodríguez	1
VIDA	Jaime Ochoa Hernández	0

Local elections will be held in the Mexican state of Nuevo León on 6 June 2027. Voters will elect a governor for a six-year term, all 42 members of the Congress of Nuevo León, and the municipal presidents and councils for all 51 municipalities.

== Background ==
For most of the period after Mexico's democratic transition, politics in Nuevo León was dominated by the Institutional Revolutionary Party (PRI) and the National Action Party (PAN). That pattern broke in 2015, when Jaime Rodríguez Calderón, known as "El Bronco", won the governorship as an independent, the first candidate from outside the established parties to do so. Citizens' Movement (MC) then grew into a force in the state, winning the 2018 Senate race and, in 2021, the governorship.

=== Previous elections ===
In the 2021 election, Samuel García of MC won the governorship with 36.6% of the vote, ahead of Adrián de la Garza, who ran for the PRI in alliance with the Party of the Democratic Revolution (PRD), with 27.9%, Fernando Larrazábal of the PAN with 18.2% and Clara Luz Flores of the National Regeneration Movement (Morena) with 14%; turnout was 50.9%. Although García carried 23 of the state's 26 local districts, his party won none of the district seats in Congress; the PRI–PRD alliance won 12, the PAN ten and the Morena-led alliance four. MC only won five of the 51 municipalities, among them Monterrey, where Luis Donaldo Colosio Riojas was elected.

The PAN and the PRI had long been rivals in the state. After 2021, however, they began cooperating against García in Congress. In May 2022, the two parties, with 14 and 13 deputies, formed a bloc in Congress with the single deputy of the Labor Party (PT), giving them 28 of the 42 seats, the two-thirds majority needed to amend the state constitution. For the 2024 election they formalized the alliance, registering the Fuerza y Corazón por Nuevo León coalition with the PRD, the state version of the national Fuerza y Corazón por México. The coalition ran joint candidates in all 26 districts and in 39 of the 51 municipalities.

At the 2024 election, held alongside the general election, MC made gains across the state. It won 16 of the 51 municipalities, up from five in 2021 and the same number as the PAN–PRI–PRD coalition; the PAN and the PRI won another seven where they ran separately, and the alliance of Morena and the Ecologist Green Party of Mexico (PVEM) won five. In Monterrey, however, De la Garza, now the PAN–PRI–PRD candidate, defeated García's wife, Mariana Rodríguez Cantú, by about eight points. In the congressional election, the PAN–PRI–PRD coalition won 16 of the 26 districts, and the rest were divided between MC and the Morena–PVEM alliance. Once the proportional seats were assigned, the PAN and MC held ten seats each, Morena nine, the PRI eight, the PRD three, and the PT and the PVEM one each, leaving the PAN–PRI–PRD bloc with 21 of the 42 seats, one short of a majority.

In the federal races, the Senate contest in the state was a close three-way race. Morena's ticket of Waldo Fernández and Judith Díaz, won with 33.94% of the vote, ahead of MC's Colosio with 32.13% and the PAN–PRI–PRD ticket with 31.51%; Colosio took the seat reserved for the runner-up. In the presidential election, MC's candidate, Jorge Máynez, received 18.05% of the vote in Nuevo León, his second-best result in the country.

== Electoral system ==
=== Governor ===
The Governor of Nuevo León is elected every six years by plurality in a single round and takes office on 4 October of the election year. Anyone who has held the office through an ordinary or special election may never hold it again, even as an interim or substitute governor, so the incumbent, Samuel García of Citizens' Movement (MC), cannot stand. Candidates must be at least 28 years old on election day; a constitutional amendment approved unanimously by the Congress of Nuevo León on 29 June 2026 and published on 7 July lowered the minimum from 30 and applies from the 2027 election.

No state law sets the gender of gubernatorial candidates. In June 2026, the Superior Chamber of the Electoral Tribunal of the Federal Judiciary (TEPJF) found that the Congress had not adopted rules guaranteeing gender parity for the governorship and ordered it to legislate gender alternation in nominations, but the legislative committees adjourned without approving the pending electoral reforms. Each party therefore chooses the gender of its nominee, subject to any nationwide parity criteria for the seventeen governorships contested in 2027, which the National Electoral Institute (INE) had not issued as of September 2026.

=== Congress ===
The 42 members of the Congress of Nuevo León serve three-year terms beginning on 1 September of the election year; those elected in 2027 will form the LXXVIII Legislature. Twenty-six are elected by plurality in single-member districts and sixteen by proportional representation. A party's proportional seats go first to the two candidates on its party list and then to its losing district candidates who won the highest percentage of the vote in their districts. Only parties that win at least 3% of the valid statewide vote take part in the allocation. No party may hold more than 26 seats in total, and no party's share of the chamber may exceed its share of the vote by more than eight percentage points.

The 2027 election is the last at which deputies may seek consecutive re-election. To apply gender parity to district nominations, the electoral institute divided the 26 districts into two blocs of thirteen. Each party must nominate women in at least half of the districts it contests in each bloc, and where that number is odd the extra nomination must also go to a woman.

=== Municipalities ===
All 51 municipal councils (ayuntamientos) are renewed every three years, and those elected in 2027 take office on 30 September. Each council is elected as a slate made up of a municipal president (mayor), regidores (councillors) and síndicos, and the slate that wins a plurality takes office as a whole, with additional regidor seats then allocated to other parties by proportional representation. As with deputies, 2027 is the last election at which municipal officers may seek consecutive re-election. Parties must nominate women for at least half of the mayoralties they contest.

The 2027 councils will be smaller in the state's most populous municipalities. A federal constitutional reform promoted by President Claudia Sheinbaum, known as the "Plan B", was declared in force on 14 April 2026 after nineteen state legislatures had ratified it. It limits each municipal council to fifteen regidores and caps the annual budget of state legislatures at 0.70% of the state budget, with both changes applying from 2027. On 19 August 2026, the state electoral institute cut the number of seats in six municipalities to meet the cap for the 2027 and 2030 elections. Monterrey, whose 28 regidores made its council the largest in the country, will have 15, and Guadalupe will go from 21 to 15.

=== Candidates and coalitions ===
Parties may form coalitions for the governorship, the district seats and the municipal councils, but coalition partners register their proportional lists for Congress separately. Newly registered parties may not join a coalition until they have contested their first election, so Building Societies of Peace (PAZ) and SOMOS must run alone. A June 2026 amendment to the state constitution also lowered the minimum age for deputies and municipal officers from 21 to 18.

Independent candidates may run for all three levels of office. Aspirants for governor must collect signatures equal to 1.5% of the state electoral roll as of 30 September 2026, including at least 1% of the roll in each of at least 26 municipalities. District aspirants need 1% of the district roll, gathered across at least half of the district's electoral sections. For municipal slates, the requirement ranges from 10% of the roll in municipalities with no more than 4,000 voters to 1% in those with more than 300,000. The electoral institute approved the call for independent candidacies on 5 October 2026.

=== Voters and administration ===
The election is organized by the State Electoral and Citizen Participation Institute of Nuevo León (IEEPCNL), which formally opened the 2026–2027 local electoral process on 6 October 2026. The state election is held on the same day as the federal election for the Chamber of Deputies, in which Nuevo León elects 14 district deputies. Including those federal seats, 608 offices are up for election in the state. As of August 2026, the state electoral roll held 4,764,181 voters, and the INE planned to install 7,869 polling stations. Pre-campaigns run from 13 December 2026 to 21 January 2027, and campaigns from 4 April to 2 June 2027.

== Political parties and coalitions ==
Nine political parties held registration or accreditation before the Instituto Estatal Electoral y de Participación Ciudadana (IEEPC), the state electoral authority, as of August 2026. Eight hold national registration — the National Action Party (PAN), the Institutional Revolutionary Party (PRI), the Labor Party (PT), the Ecologist Green Party of Mexico (PVEM), Citizens' Movement (MC), the National Regeneration Movement (Morena), Building Societies of Peace (PAZ) and We Are (SOMOS) — while VIDA is registered only in Nuevo León.

PAZ and SOMOS obtained national registration from the National Electoral Institute (INE) on 25 June 2026, effective from 1 July, and were accredited before the IEEPC on 25 and 31 July 2026 respectively.

=== Summary ===
Party	State leader	Ideology	2024 result	
Party	State leader	Ideology	PR vote (%)	Seats
Citizens' Movement	Baltazar Gilberto Martínez Ríos	Social democracy; Participatory democracy; Progressivism	27.67%	10 / 42 (24%)
National Action Party	Policarpo Flores	National conservatism; Christian democracy	20.72%	10 / 42 (24%)
National Regeneration Movement	Anabel del Roble Alcocer Cruz	Anti-neoliberalism; Alter-globalization; Left-wing populism; Left-wing nationalism	21.44%	9 / 42 (21%)
Institutional Revolutionary Party	José Luis Garza Ochoa	Catch-all politics	13.85%	8 / 42 (19%)
Ecologist Green Party of Mexico	Edgar Salvatierra	Green politics	4.41%	1 / 42 (2%)
Labor Party	Guadalupe Rodríguez	Socialism; Maoism; Socialism of the 21st century	3.10%	1 / 42 (2%)
VIDA	Jaime Ochoa Hernández	Social conservatism; Anti-abortion	2.36%	0 / 42 (0%)
Building Societies of Peace	Melissa Paola Miranda Paz	Christian right	Did not exist	
We Are	Sandra Patricia Moreno Ramírez	Progressivism	Did not exist	

== Gubernatorial candidates ==
As of October 2026, no party had formally nominated a candidate for governor. Parties select their nominees during the pre-campaign period, which runs from 13 December 2026 to 21 January 2027.

=== National Regeneration Movement ===
The National Regeneration Movement (Morena) chose its nominee by survey, and the winner was to be named the party's "coordinator of the defense of the transformation" in the state, its title for a presumptive nominee. Seven aspirants took part. Clara Luz Flores had been mayor of General Escobedo three times, and Tatiana Clouthier had announced her bid in March while heading the Institute for Mexicans Abroad. Two senators, Judith Díaz and Waldo Fernández, also ran, as did Andrés Mijes, Escobedo's mayor at the time. Jesús Alberto Elizondo, a member of the state Congress, was put forward by the Labor Party (PT), one of the party's national allies. The seventh, Felipe de Jesús Cantú, was a former mayor of Monterrey who had been a member of the National Action Party (PAN) for nearly four decades.

The party decided by a telephone survey followed by a household survey, with 1,500 interviews in each state. Each aspirant was measured on eight scored rubrics worth a fixed number of points, ten in all, and each rubric's points went entirely to the aspirant with the highest percentage in it, with ties shared. On 28 September 2026, the party named Flores as its coordinator for Nuevo León, giving her a second attempt at the governorship after her 2021 campaign, in which she led early polls but finished fourth after a video showed her with Keith Raniere, the leader of the NXIVM cult. She led on preference, the most heavily weighted rubric, by less than a point, but won five of the eight rubrics outright and shared a sixth with Cantú, giving her 8.625 of the 10 points.

Results of the National Regeneration Movement's survey in Nuevo León
Aspirant	Name recognition	Positive opinion (2)	Honesty (1.25)	Closeness (0.25)	Knows the state (0.25)	Keeps their word (0.25)	Good candidate (1)	Would vote for (2)	Preference as alliance candidate (3)	Points
Clara Luz Flores	45.64%	18.53% 2	12.18% 1.25	12.20%	17.98% 0.25	11.13% 0.125	14.44%	14.17% 2	14.49% 3	8.625
Felipe de Jesús Cantú	37.72%	17.91%	12.03%	11.76%	17.10%	11.13% 0.125	15.14% 1	13.28%	13.56%	1.125
Waldo Fernández	31.07%	16.62%	11.28%	12.45% 0.25	14.11%	11.09%	14.80%	13.48%	13.51%	0.25
Andrés Mijes	30.81%	15.00%	9.71%	12.42%	13.02%	9.90%	12.70%	11.09%	9.89%	0
Tatiana Clouthier	27.82%	15.19%	10.45%	9.50%	12.24%	9.25%	11.87%	11.24%	10.39%	0
Jesús Alberto Elizondo	24.04%	10.51%	6.26%	6.07%	8.73%	5.91%	7.26%	6.08%	5.92%	0

Díaz congratulated Flores on her appointment, and Fernández accepted the result, saying that "one wins with class and loses with class". Clouthier initially said she was satisfied with the process, but she later questioned whether the party had carried out a survey at all and launched her own movement, Todos con Conciencia. President Claudia Sheinbaum defended the survey, saying that while individuals could have their own perceptions, "the survey is the opinion of the people".

=== Independents ===
Adalberto Madero, a former mayor of Monterrey, registered with the IEEPCNL as an independent aspirant on 29 October 2026.
