= Eduardo Bailey =

Mexican politician

Eduardo Bailey Elizondo (born 14 October 1961) is a Mexican politician affiliated with the Institutional Revolutionary Party (PRI) who has served in the lower house of Congress.

In 2000 Bailey was designated municipal president (mayor) of the municipality of Escobedo when the municipal president, Abel Guerra, left that position seeking a seat in Congress. In the 2003 mid-terms he was elected to the Chamber of Deputies to represent Nuevo León's 3rd district during the 59th session of Congress.

In 2006 he was the PRI candidate for municipal president of San Nicolás for the municipal election held on 2 July. He lost the election to the National Action Party (PAN) candidate Zeferino Salgado.

He was re-elected to Congress for Nuevo León's 3rd in the 2009 mid-terms.

Preceded by Abel Guerra Garza	Municipal president of Escobedo; 2000	Succeeded by Leonel Chávez Rangel
