= 2006 Nuevo León state election =

Local election in Mexico

A local election was scheduled to be held in the Mexican state of Nuevo León on Sunday, July 2, 2006. Voters will go to the polls to elect, on the local level:

- 51 municipal presidents (mayors) to serve for a three-year term.
- 42 local deputies (26 by the first-past-the-post system and 16 by proportional representation) to serve for a three-year term in the Congress of Nuevo León.

== Municipal elections ==
The following table shows candidates by party to the municipalities within the Monterrey metropolitan area.

Municipality	PRI-PVEM	PAN	PRD-PT-CD	PANAL	PASDC
Monterrey	Abel Guerra	Adalberto Madero (elected)	Francisco Fuentes		
Guadalupe	Cristina Díaz (elected)	Jesús María Elizondo	Rogelio Benavides		
San Pedro	Benjamín Clariond	Fernando Margáin (elected)			
San Nicolás	Eduardo Bailey	Zeferino Salgado (elected)			
Santa Catarina	Tomás Candia Valdiviezo	Dionisio Herrera (elected)		Jorge Alanís	
Apodaca	Raymundo Flores (elected)	Braulio Martínez			
Escobedo	Margarita Martínez (elected)				
