= Abel Guerra =

Mexican politician

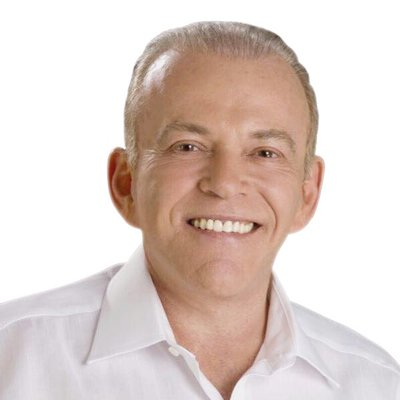
Abel Guerra

Abel Guerra Garza (born 30 July 1954 in Reynosa, Tamaulipas) is a Mexican politician affiliated with the Institutional Revolutionary Party (PRI) who has served twice as municipal president of Escobedo, Nuevo León (1992–1994 and 1997–2000), and once as a federal congressman in the lower house of the Mexican Congress (2000–2002, representing Nuevo León's 3rd district).

Guerra holds a bachelor's degree in Architecture and a master's degree in business administration (MBA) from the Autonomous University of Nuevo León (UANL).

In 2003 he was elected local deputy to serve in the Congress of Nuevo León but left that position to serve in the cabinet of Governor José Natividad González Parás.

He was the PRI presidential candidate to the Monterrey municipality during the 2006 local elections held on 2 July, but lost against the PAN candidate Adalberto Madero.

In 2009 he tried to be PRI candidate to the 2009 Nuevo León gubernatorial election but instead he was designated the PRI candidate to the Monterrey municipal presidency election.

In the 2012 general election he was re-elected to the Chamber of Deputies to represent Nuevo León's 3rd district.
