= 3rd federal electoral district of Nuevo León =

Federal electoral district of Mexico

Nuevo León's 3rd
- Electoral district of the Chamber of Deputies of Mexico

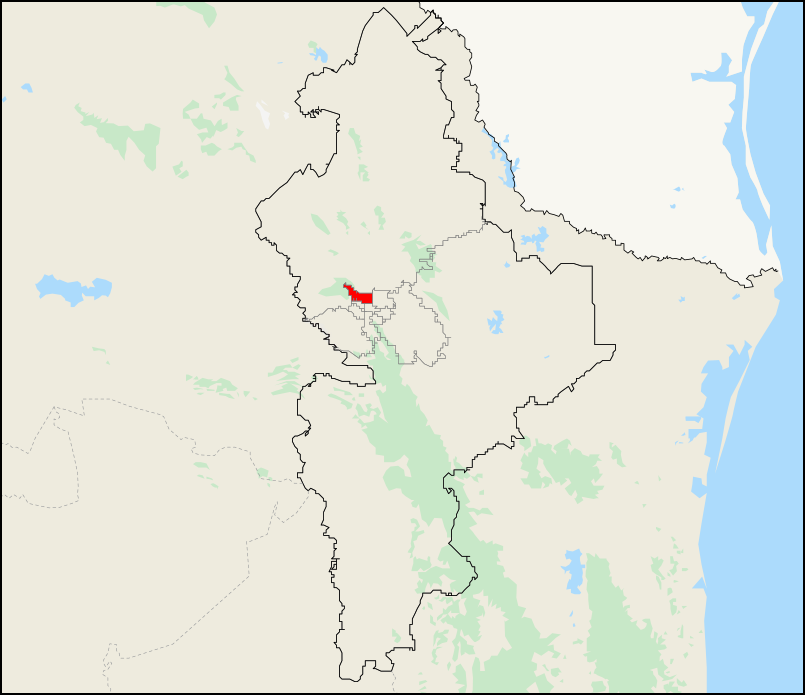

Incumbent
- Member: Clara Luz Flores
- Party: ▌Morena
- Congress: 66th (2024–2027)

District
- State: Nuevo León
- Head town: General Escobedo
- Coordinates: 25°48′N 100°19′W
- Covers: General Escobedo (part)
- PR region: Second
- Precincts: 158
- Population: 470,320 (2020 census)

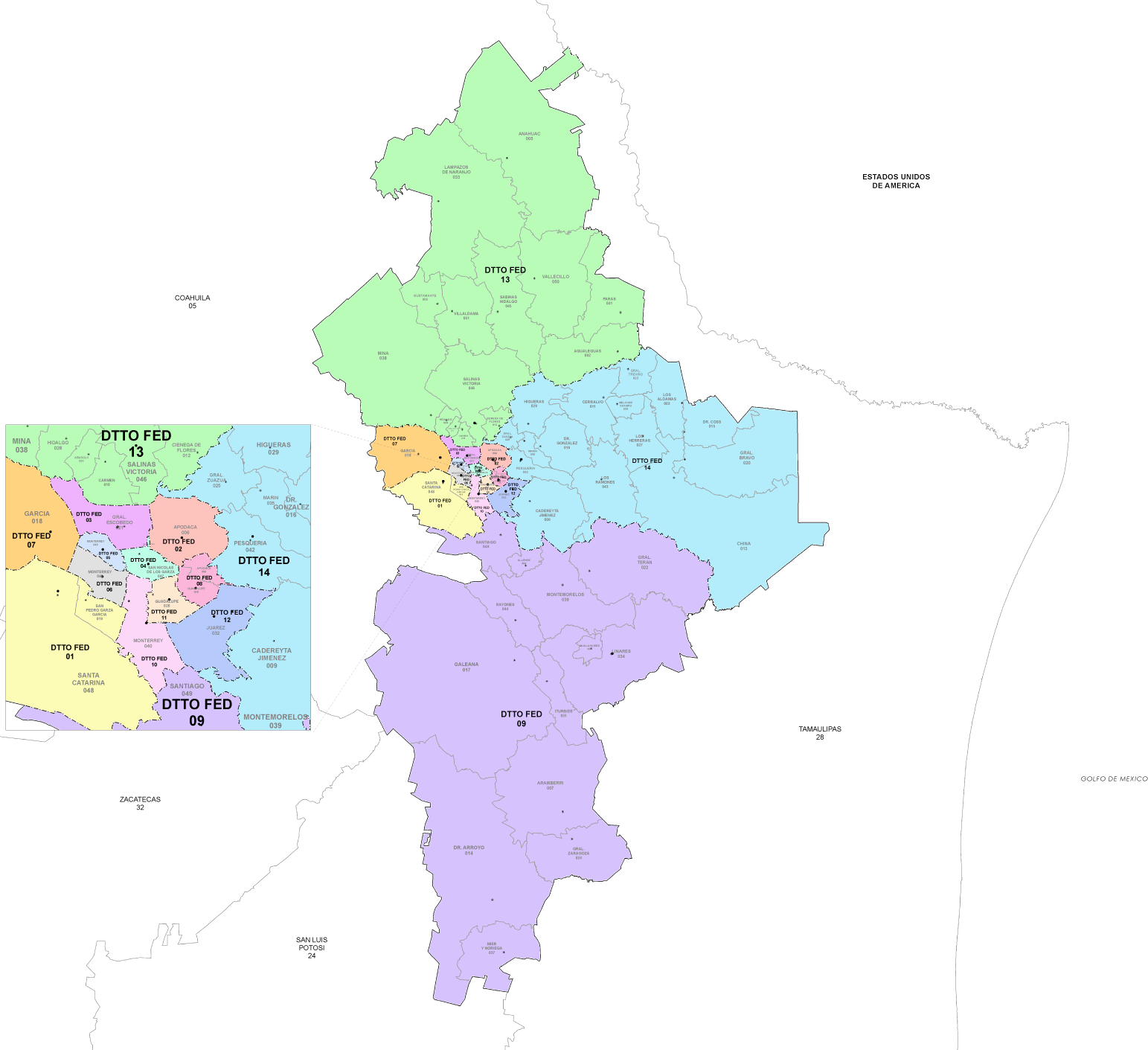
Nuevo León under the 2023 districting plan

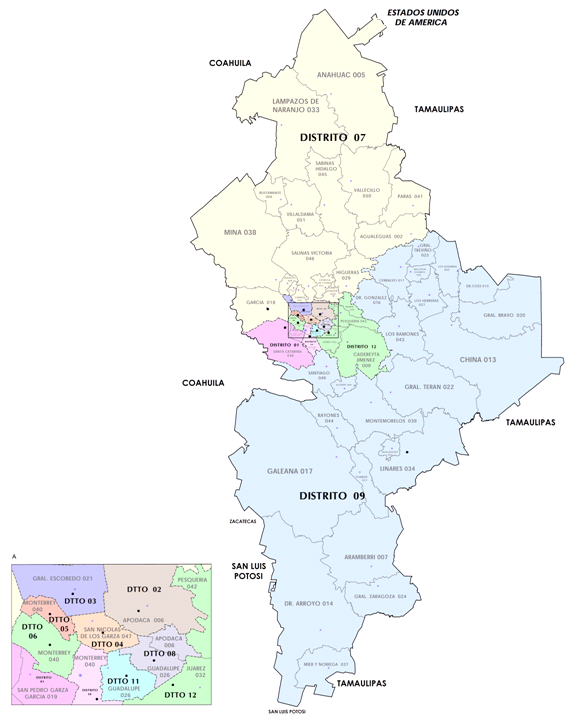
Nuevo León's districts in 2017–2022

The 3rd federal electoral district of Nuevo León (Spanish: Distrito electoral federal 03 de Nuevo León) is one of the 300 electoral districts into which Mexico is divided for elections to the federal Chamber of Deputies and one of 14 such districts in the state of Nuevo León.

It elects one deputy to the lower house of Congress for each three-year legislative session by means of the first-past-the-post system. Votes cast in the district also count towards the calculation of proportional representation ("plurinominal") deputies elected from the second region.

The current member for the district, elected in the 2024 general election, is Clara Luz Flores of the National Regeneration Movement (Morena).

== District territory ==
Under the 2023 districting plan adopted by the National Electoral Institute (INE), which is to be used for the 2024, 2027 and 2030 federal elections, Nuevo León's congressional seat allocation rose from 12 to 14. The third district is in the northern part of the Monterrey metropolitan area and covers 158 electoral precincts (secciones electorales) in the municipality of General Escobedo. (Note: The remainder of the municipality – 8 precincts – is assigned to the 4th district.)

The district's head town (cabecera distrital), where results from individual polling stations are gathered together and tallied, is the city of General Escobedo. The district reported a population of 470,320 in the 2020 census.

== Previous districting schemes ==
Evolution of electoral district numbers
	1974	1978	1996	2005	2017	2023
Nuevo León	7	11	11	12	12	14
Chamber of Deputies	196	300				

2017–2022

Between 2017 and 2022, the district comprised the municipality of General Escobedo (124 precincts).

2005–2017

Under the 2005 districting plan, the district covered the whole of General Escobedo (64 precincts) and 74 precincts in the municipality of San Nicolás de los Garza. The head town was at General Escobedo.

1996–2005

From 1996 to 2005, the district's head town was at San Nicolás de los Garza. It covered the northern portion of San Nicolás (87 precincts) and the whole of General Escobedo (64 precincts).

1978–1996

The districting scheme in force from 1978 to 1996 was the result of the 1977 electoral reforms, which increased the number of single-member seats in the Chamber of Deputies from 196 to 300. Under that plan, Nuevo León's seat allocation rose from 7 to 11. The 3rd district's head town was the state capital, Monterrey, and it covered a portion of that city.

== Deputies returned to Congress ==
(Mexico) National parties
- Current
- PAN
- PRI
- PT
- PVEM
- MC
- Morena
- PAZ
- Somos
- Defunct or local only
- PLM
- PNR
- PRM
- PNM
- PP
- PPS
- PARM
- PFCRN
- CON
- PANAL
- PSD
- PES
- PES
- PRD

Nuevo León's 3rd district
Election	Deputy	Party	Term	Legislature
1916	Luis Ilizaliturri		1916–1917	Constituent Congress of Querétaro
...
1979	Luis Medina Peña	Institutional Revolutionary Party	1979–1982	51st Congress
1982	Carlota Guadalupe Vargas Garza	Institutional Revolutionary Party	1982–1985	52nd Congress
1985	Jesús Ricardo Canavati Tafich	Institutional Revolutionary Party	1985–1988	53rd Congress
1988	Felipe Onofre Zambrano Páez	Institutional Revolutionary Party	1988–1991	54th Congress
1991	Óscar Federico Herrera Hosking	Institutional Revolutionary Party	1991–1994	55th Congress
1994	Carlota Guadalupe Vargas Garza	Institutional Revolutionary Party	1994–1997	56th Congress
1997	Baldemar Tudón Martírez	National Action Party (Mexico)	1997–2000	57th Congress
2000	Abel Guerra Garza	Institutional Revolutionary Party	2000–2003	58th Congress
2003	Eduardo Alonso Bailey Elizondo	Institutional Revolutionary Party	2003–2006	59th Congress
2006	José Luis Murillo Torres	National Action Party (Mexico)	2006–2009	60th Congress
2009	Eduardo Alonso Bailey Elizondo	Institutional Revolutionary Party	2009–2012	61st Congress
2012	Abel Guerra Garza	Institutional Revolutionary Party	2012–2015	62nd Congress
2015	Juana Aurora Cavazos Cavazos	Institutional Revolutionary Party	2015–2018	63rd Congress
2018	José Luis García Duque (Note: García Duque switched from the PES to the PT effective 31 August 2019.)	Social Encounter Party Labour Party (Mexico)	2018–2021	64th Congress
2021	Wendy Maricela Cordero González	National Action Party (Mexico)	2021–2024	65th Congress
2024	Clara Luz Flores Carrales	National Regeneration Movement	2024–2027	66th Congress

== Presidential elections ==
Nuevo León's 3rd district
Election	District won by	Party or coalition	%
2018	Andrés Manuel López Obrador	Juntos Haremos Historia	39.1430
2024	Claudia Sheinbaum Pardo	Sigamos Haciendo Historia	53.6743
