= Raymundo Flores =

Mexican politician

Raymundo Flores Elizondo is a Mexican politician affiliated with the Institutional Revolutionary Party (PRI) who served in the cabinet of Governor José Natividad González Parás.was municipal president of Apodaca.

== Information ==
Flores Elizondo has served as municipal president of the Municipality of Apodaca, then from 2000 to 2003 he served in the Congress of Nuevo León during the LXIX Legislature. From 2003 to 2006 he served in the cabinet of Governor José Natividad González Parás as the head of the Monterrey Metro but left that position in 2006 to run again as the PRI candidate to municipal president of Apodaca for the municipal election to be held on July 2, 2006; he won the election. From 2009 to 2012 he served again as local deputy in the Congress of Nuevo León and then in 2012 he ran again for mayor of Apodaca. He won the election and served as mayor from 2012 to 2015.
