= Ford F-Series (medium-duty truck) =

Medium-duty line of trucks manufactured by Ford

Ford F-Series (medium duty)
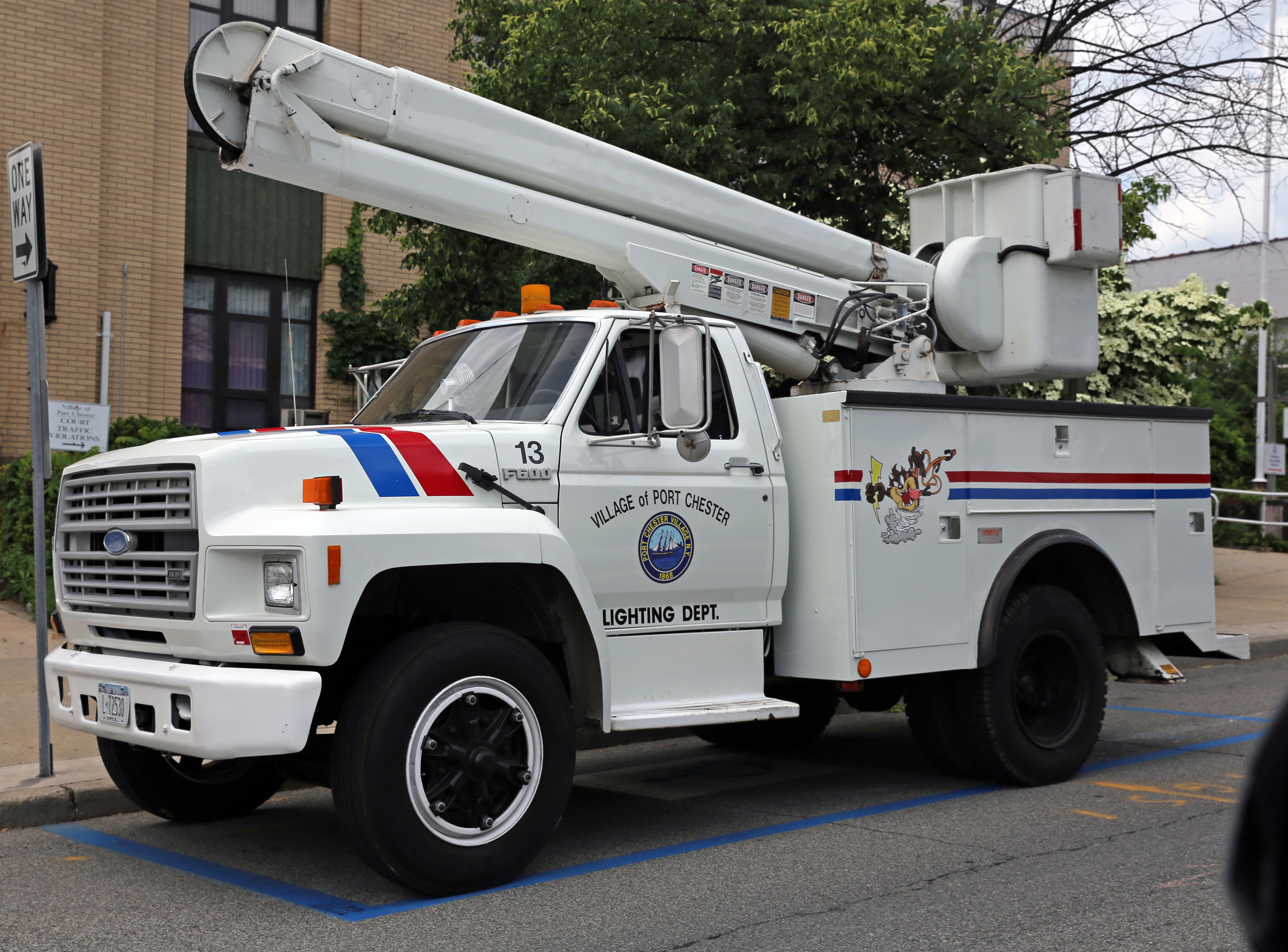
- Sixth generation Ford F-600

Overview
- Manufacturer: Ford Motor Company (1948-1998, 2016–present); Blue Diamond Truck (Ford Motor Company/Navistar International joint venture; 2000–2015)
- Production: 1948–present

Body and chassis
- Class: Medium-duty and heavy-duty trucks (Class 6, 7 and 8)
- Body style: Commercial vehicle (various bodies); 2-door truck 2+2 door truck 4-door truck
- Related: International 4000-Series/DuraStar/MV; International XT; Ford Super Duty; Ford B series

The medium-duty version of the Ford F-Series is a range of commercial trucks manufactured by the Ford Motor Company since 1948. Derived from the smaller F-Series pickup trucks, the medium-duty range is currently in its eighth generation. Initially slotted between the F-Series pickup trucks and the "Big Job" conventionals, later generations were slotted below the L-Series "Louisville" trucks; the last two generations are the largest vehicles produced by Ford since its exit from the heavy-truck segment.

The medium-duty F-Series has been used for an extensive number of applications, offered as a straight (rigid) truck and a truck-tractor (for semitrailers) in multiple cab configurations. Prior to the production of the Ford C-Series, the model line was also offered in a cab-over engine (COE) configuration; a cowled-chassis variant (the Ford B-series) was used for bus production.

For the 2000 model year, the medium-duty F-Series was branded as part of the Ford Super Duty range, consisting of the Class 6–7 Ford F-650 and F-750; Class 8 versions of the F-750 have been produced since 2011. The current generation of the medium-duty F-Series is manufactured by Ford in its Ohio Assembly facility (Avon Lake, Ohio), replacing a joint venture with Navistar International named Blue Diamond Truck Company LLC located in General Escobedo, Mexico.

== First generation (1948–1952) ==
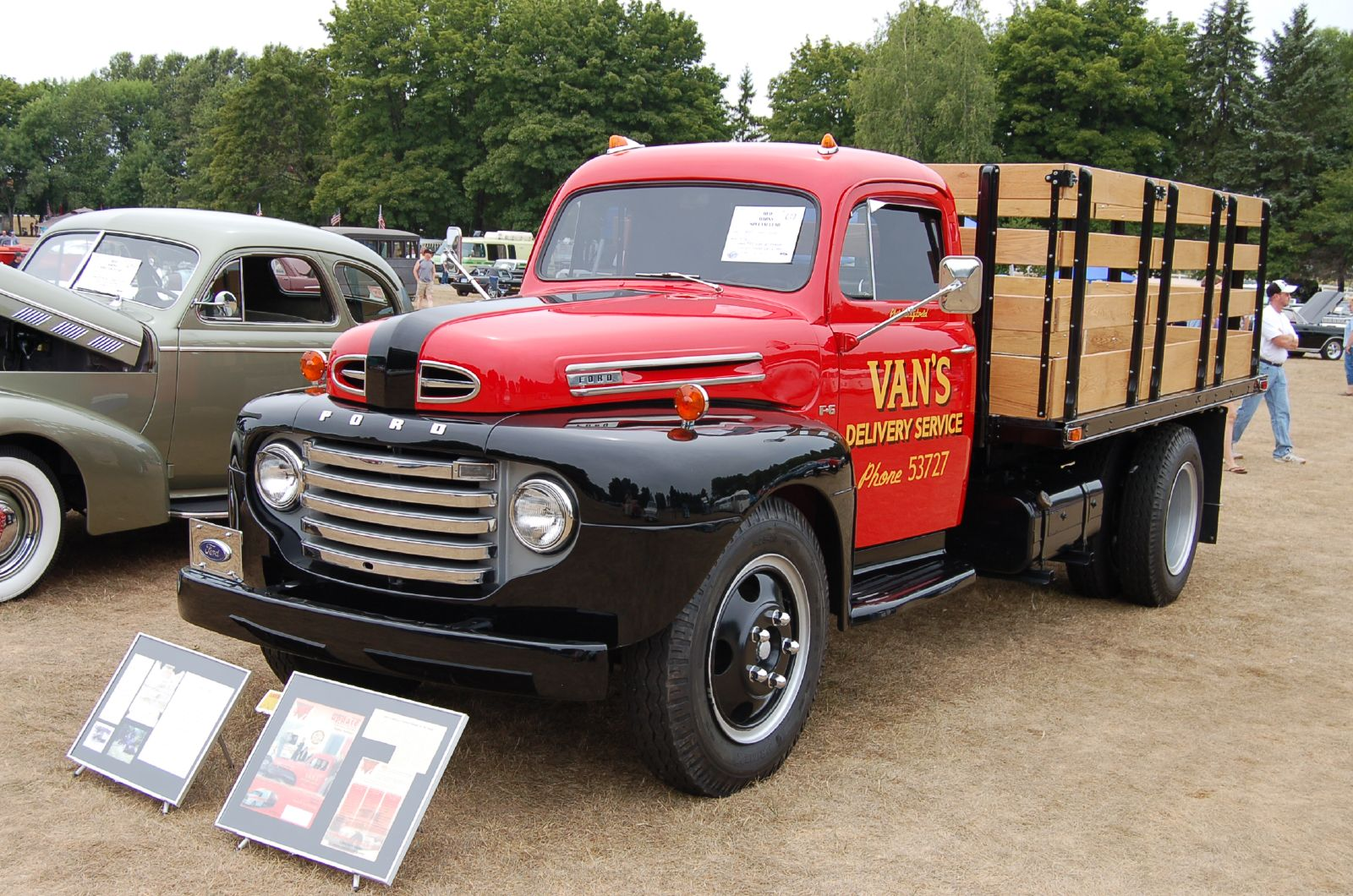
1950 Ford F-6 stake truck

For the 1948 model year, Ford introduced the F-Series as a dedicated truck platform. Along with replacing the trucks introduced before World War II, the F-Series expanded Ford trucks into several product ranges. Along with light-duty trucks, the medium-duty range was slotted below the "Extra Heavy-Duty"/"Big Job" commercial trucks..

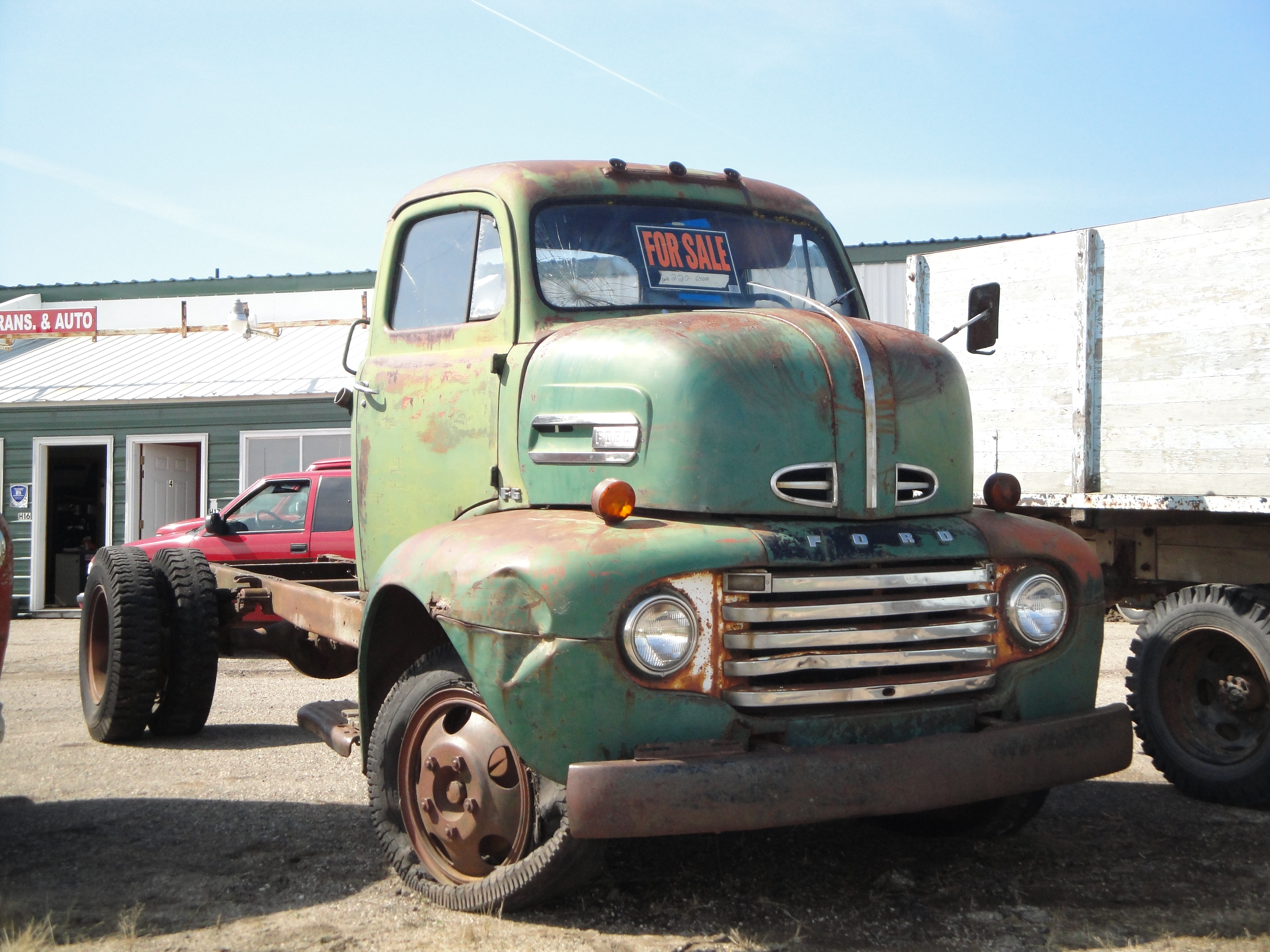
1948–1950 Ford F-6 cab over truck

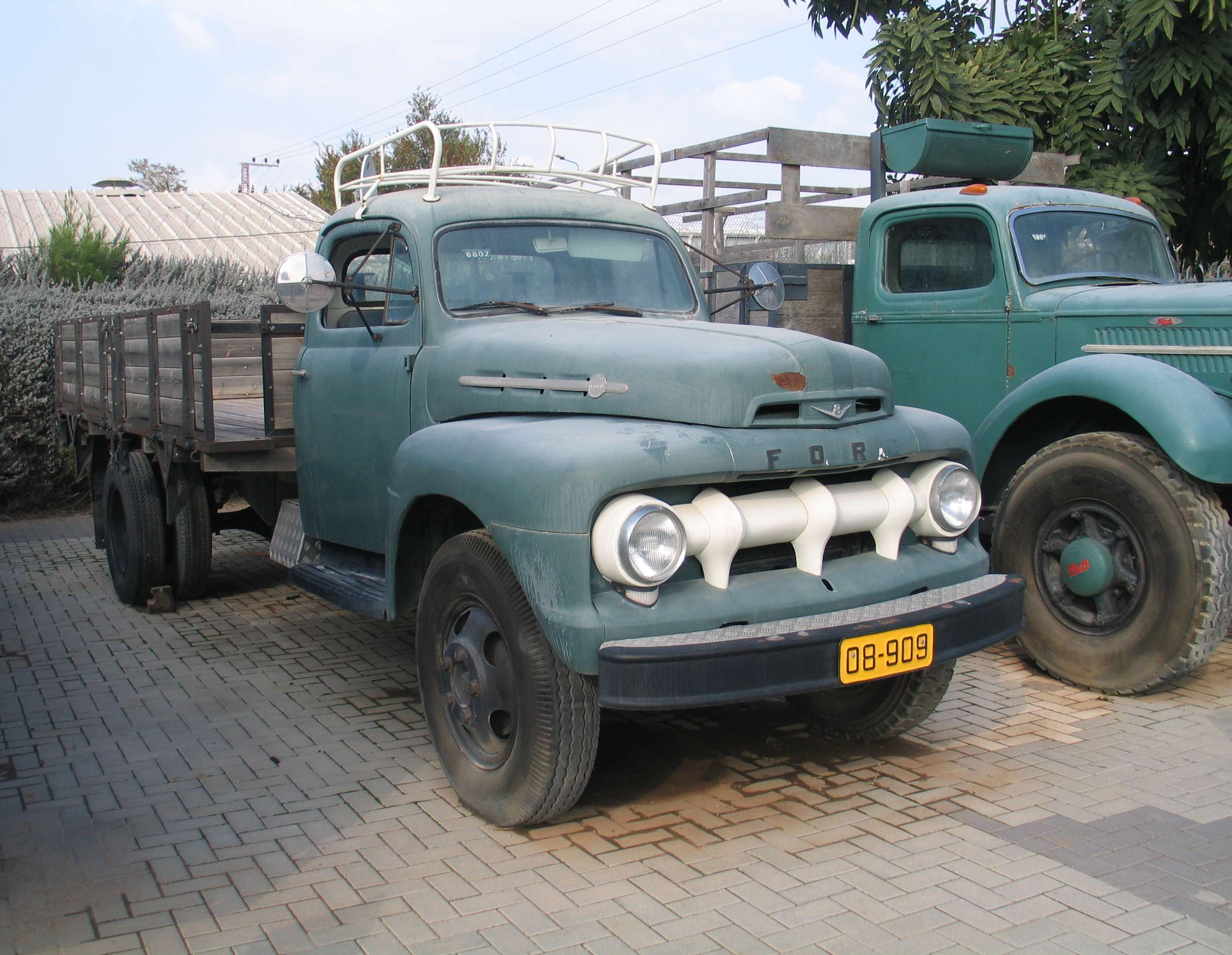
The facelift version of the medium duty F-series (conventional cab)

The medium-duty F-Series was marketed as a 1½ ton F-5 and 2 ton F-6, in both conventional and cab-over engine (COE) configurations. The F-5 and F-6 also served as the basis for the B-Series bus chassis; produced primarily for school bus use, the B-series was a bare chassis aft of the firewall.

Shared with the light-duty F-Series, the F-5 was powered by a 226-cubic-inch inline-six with a 239-cubic-inch V8 as an option. For the 1951 model year, the medium-duty F-Series received a facelift, including a new grille. Through 1951, a 254-cubic-inch inline-six was optional for the F-6; for 1952, the 226 was replaced by a 215-cubic-inch inline-six.

== Second generation (1953–1956) ==
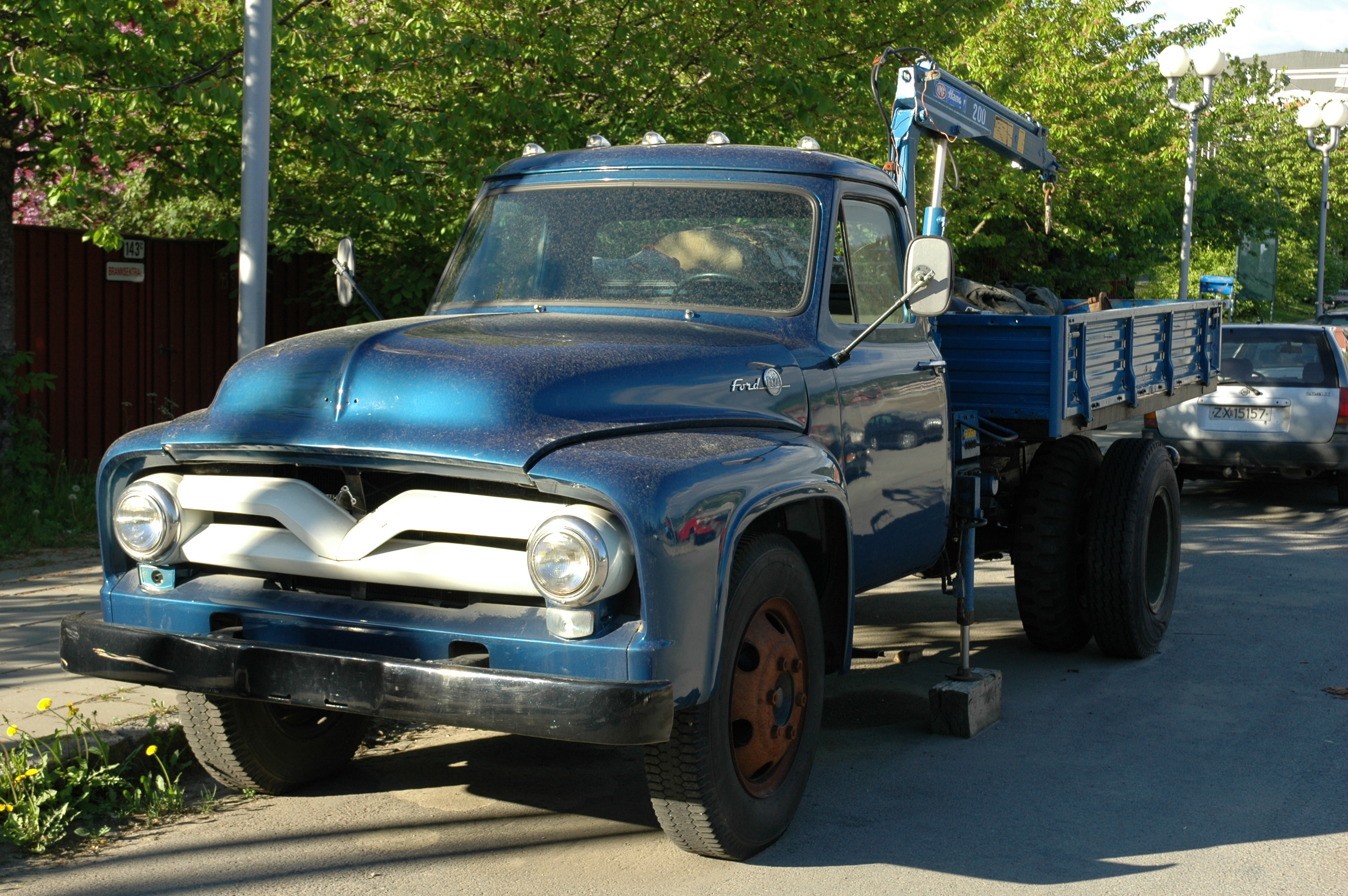
1953-1955 Ford F-620

Coinciding with the 50th anniversary of the Ford Motor Company, the second-generation F-Series was released for 1953. Alongside the vehicle redesign, the series nomenclature underwent a revision, with the F-5 and F-6 becoming the F-500 and F-600, respectively. The medium-duty range retained both conventional and COE cab configurations, as a tractor, straight truck, or bus chassis.

For 1956, F-Series medium-duty trucks shared the cab redesign of the light-duty trucks, including its wraparound windshield and vertical A-pillars.

For 1954, Ford ended production of the long-running Flathead V8, replacing it with a 239-cubic-inch Y-block V8; the 215-cubic-inch inline-six was expanded to 223 cubic inches. For 1956, the V8 was expanded to 272 cubic inches.

== Third generation (1957–1960) ==
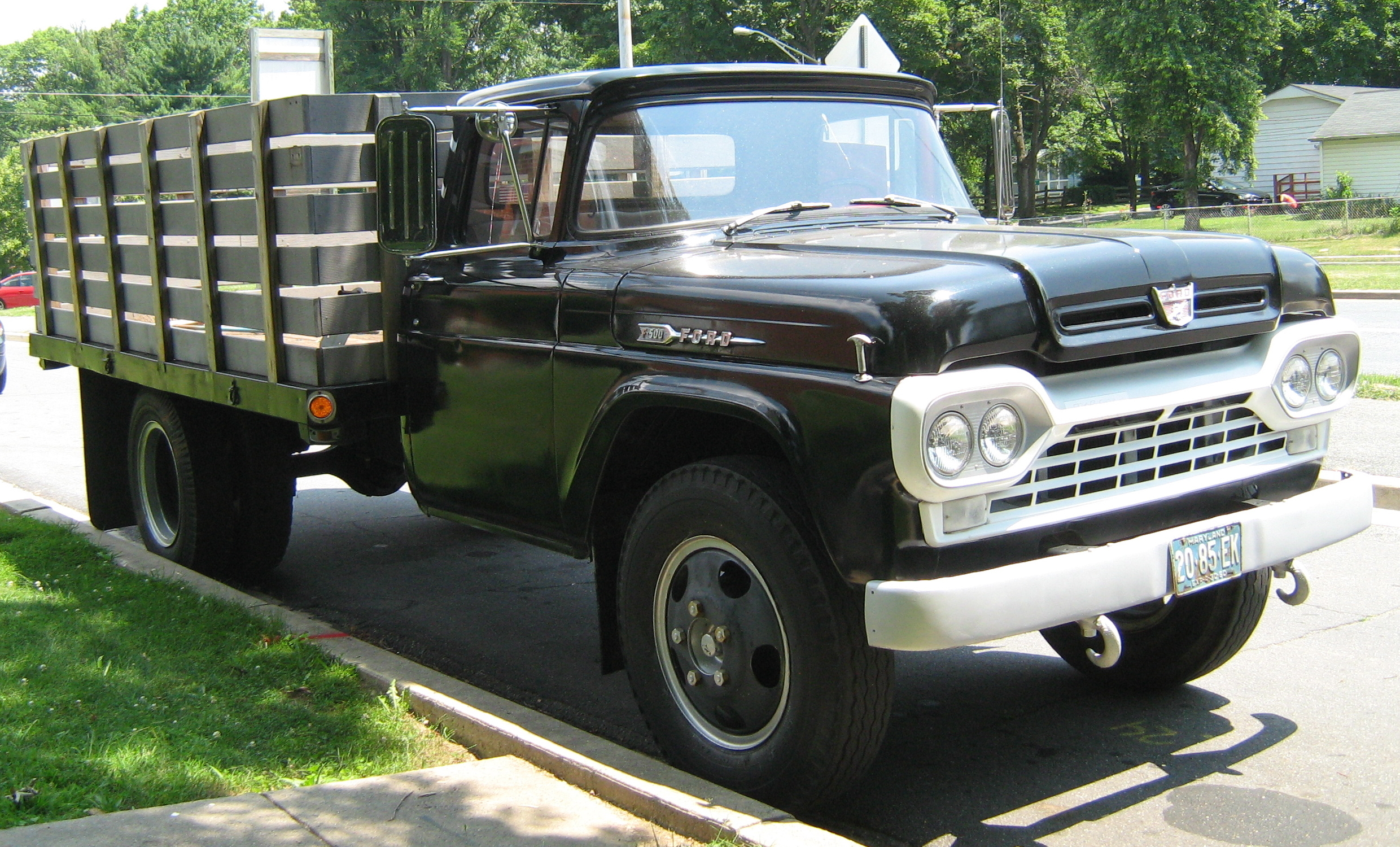
1960 Ford F-500

For the 1957 model year, the third-generation F-Series was released; medium-duty trucks introduced multiple design features that would remain part of the model line (in various forms) over the next two decades. The clamshell hood returned, but was enlarged to the width of the fenders. In another change, the grille was also enlarged, eliminating the gap between the hood and bumper. For 1958, quad headlights were introduced (following their legalization).

A 223-cubic-inch (3.7 L) inline-six was offered as a standard engine. The 239-cubic-inch (3.9 L) Ford Y-block V8 engine was carried over from the previous generation, expanded to 292 cubic inches (4.8 L) for 1958.

The medium-duty model line was reduced by one, as the F-Series COE (C-Series) was replaced by the Ford C-Series tilt-cab COE. Offering better egress and engine access, the tilt-cab design was produced for a single generation through the 1990 model year (one of the longest-running designs ever produced by Ford).

== Fourth generation (1961–1966) ==
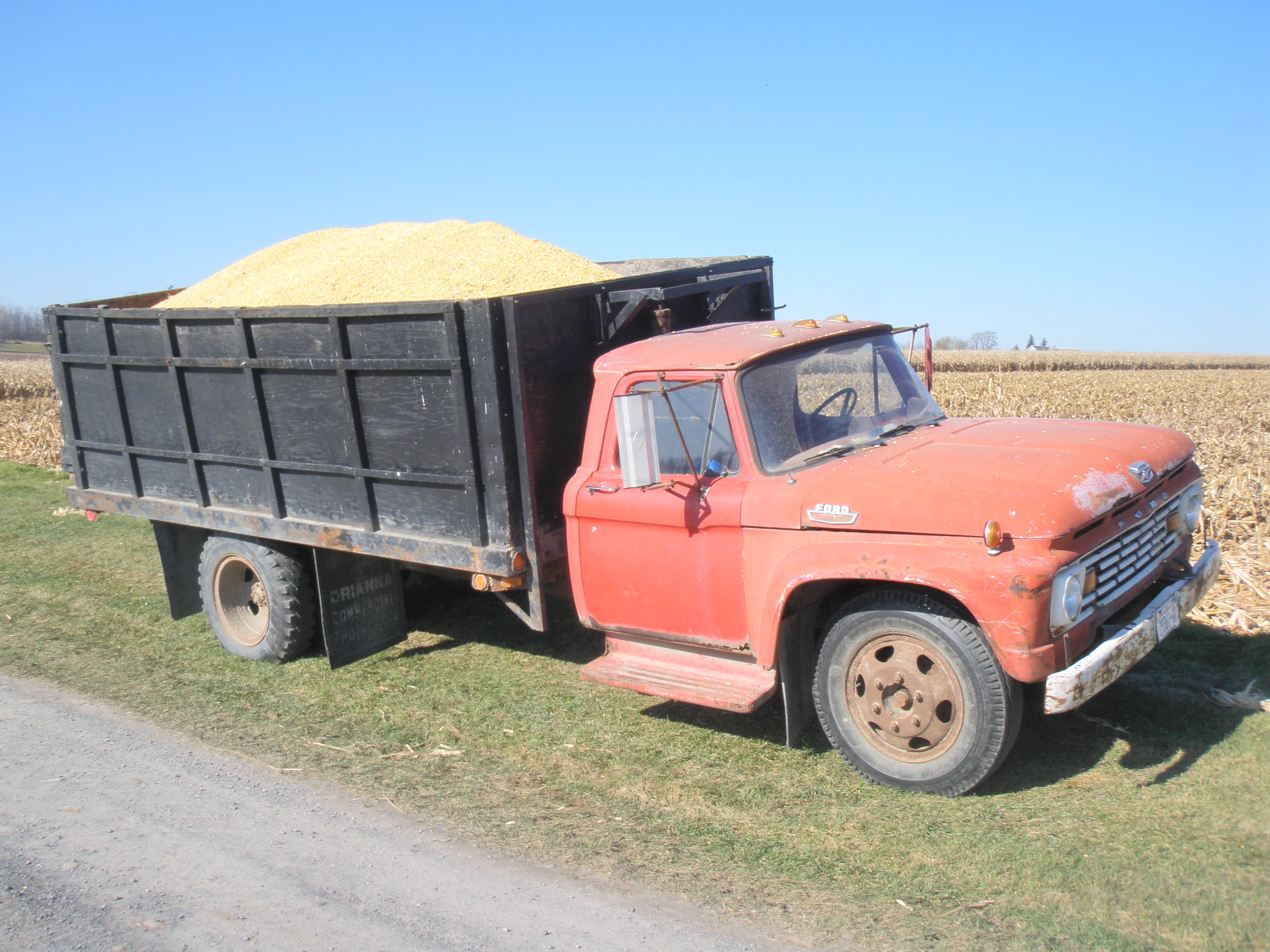
Ford F-600

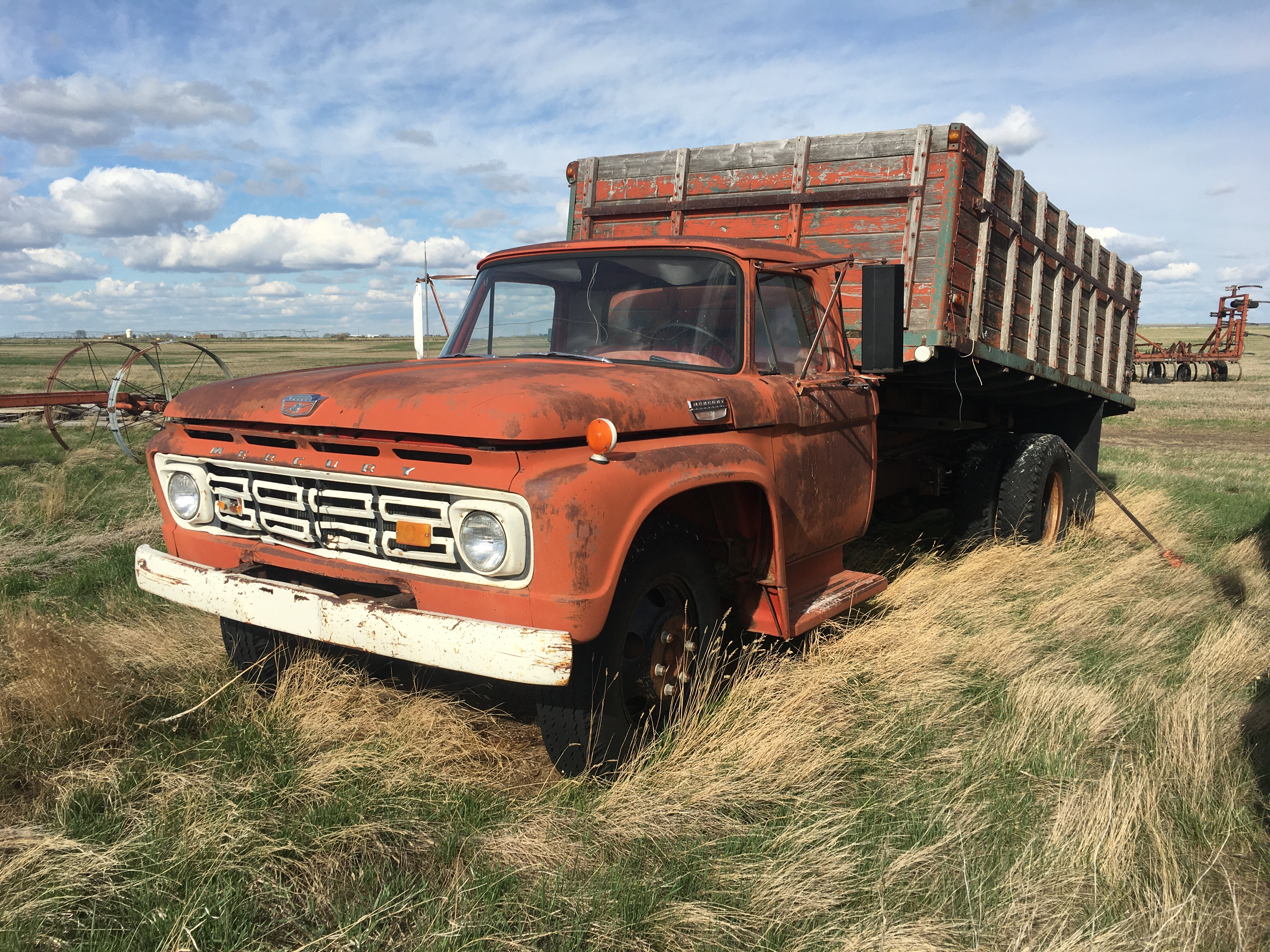
A 1964 M-600 (Mercury version)

The fourth-generation F-Series had the medium-duty trucks adopt the larger and wider cab introduced by the pickup trucks. In place of sharing drivetrains with light-duty Ford trucks, the medium-duty Ford trucks were fitted with six-cylinder and V8 engines developed specifically for truck use. The model range was expanded, with the F-700/750 shifted from the heavy-duty range to the medium-duty range.

The fourth generation marked the final generation that medium-duty trucks shared bodywork with the light-duty Ford F-Series. For 1961, F-800 and above trucks were given their own fascia (with a central slotted grille).

A Mercury version of this truck was also offered in Canada.

== Fifth generation (1967–1979) ==
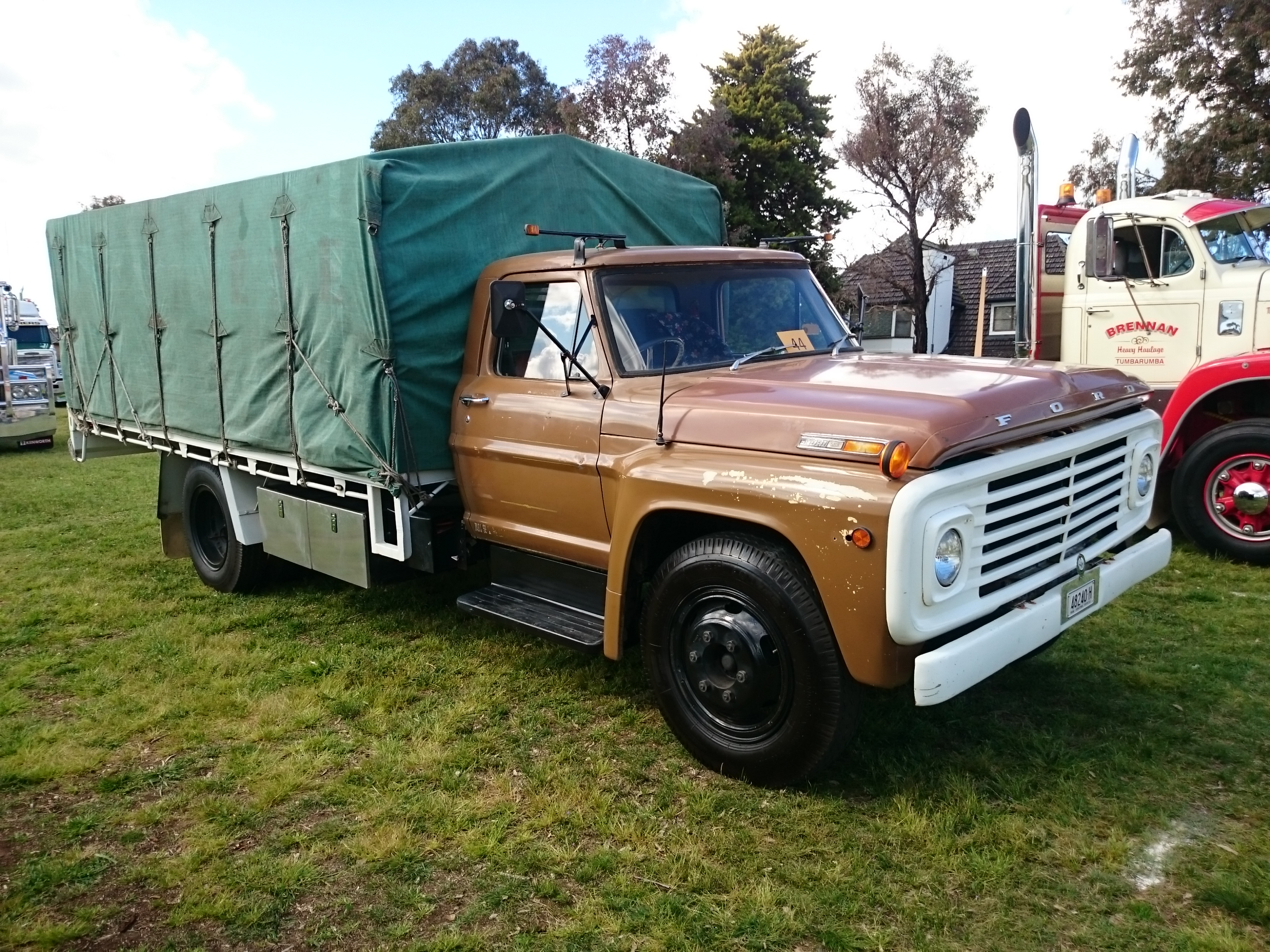
1972 Ford F-500

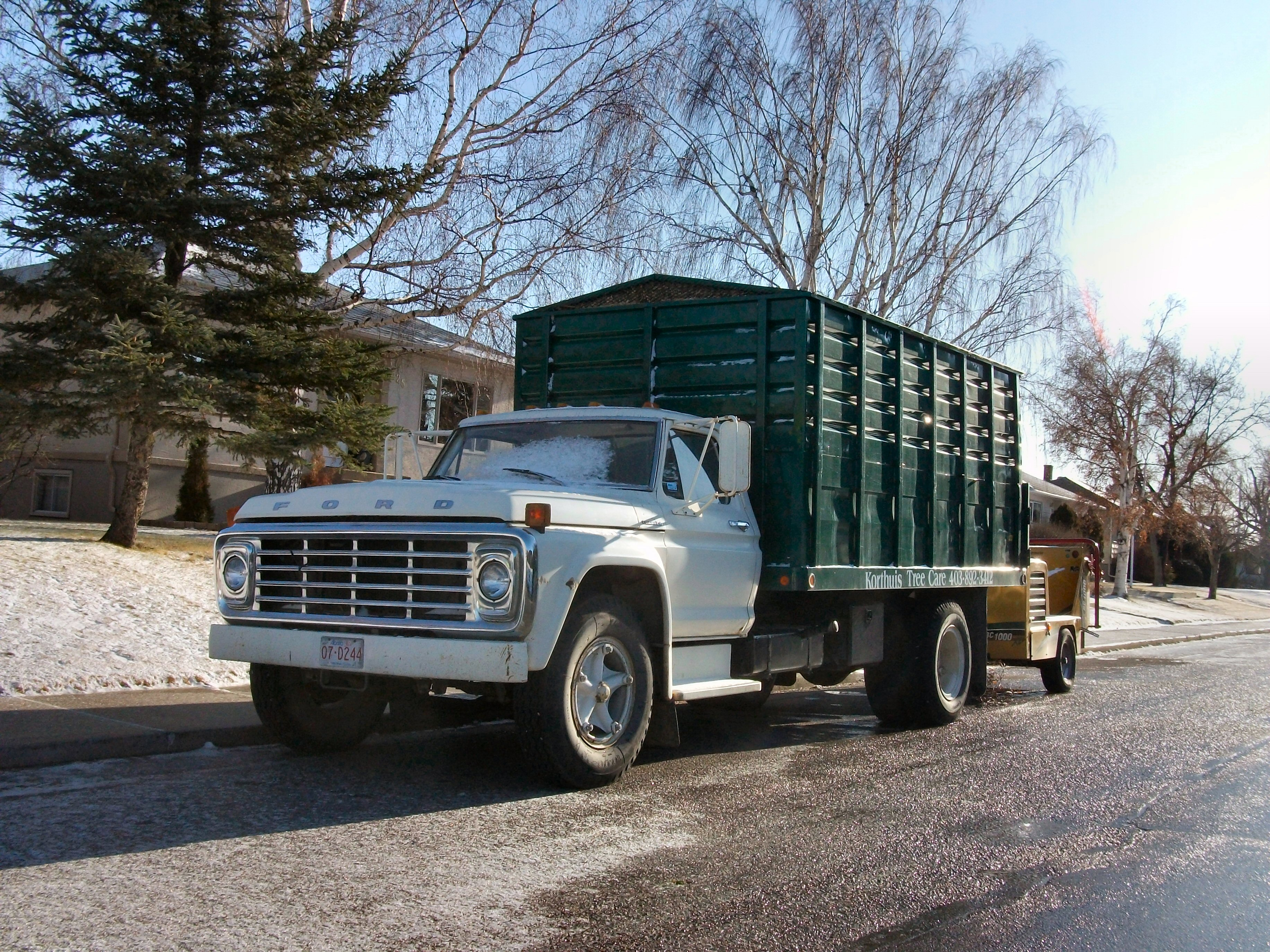
1973-1979 Ford F-Series tree trimming truck from Alberta.

=== Original design ===
The fifth-generation F-Series was introduced for the 1967 model year, with Ford diverging the design of its light-duty and medium-duty F-Series. To streamline production costs, medium-duty trucks (and bus chassis) retained the cab and hood of light-duty trucks. In place of the Twin-I-Beam suspension, a solid front axle was retained; redesigned front fenders to accommodate a wider front track (and larger wheels) were used. The front fascia was derived largely from the fourth-generation heavy-duty F-Series, adopting a full-width grille between the headlamps.

In 1968, a Caterpillar V8 diesel was introduced, becoming the first medium-duty Ford conventional to offer a diesel engine. To distinguish diesel versions, Ford added an additional "0" to the model designation, introducing the F-6000 and F-7000.

For 1970, Ford introduced L-Series range of conventional trucks. The first Class 8 conventional truck not derived from the F-Series, the L-Series (nicknamed the Louisville Line) replaced the N-Series and the heavy-duty F-Series. In another change, the stand-alone T-series designation for tandem-axle trucks (T-700 and above) was withdrawn. While the F-900 and F-1000 were discontinued, the F-800 was adopted by the medium-duty range.

=== Facelift ===
In 1973, the medium-duty range underwent a minor exterior revision. Along with a redesign of "FORD" lettering on the hood above the grille, the headlamp surrounds were enlarged. Alongside a white-painted grille, medium-duty trucks were offered with a chrome grille.

== Sixth generation (1980–1999) ==
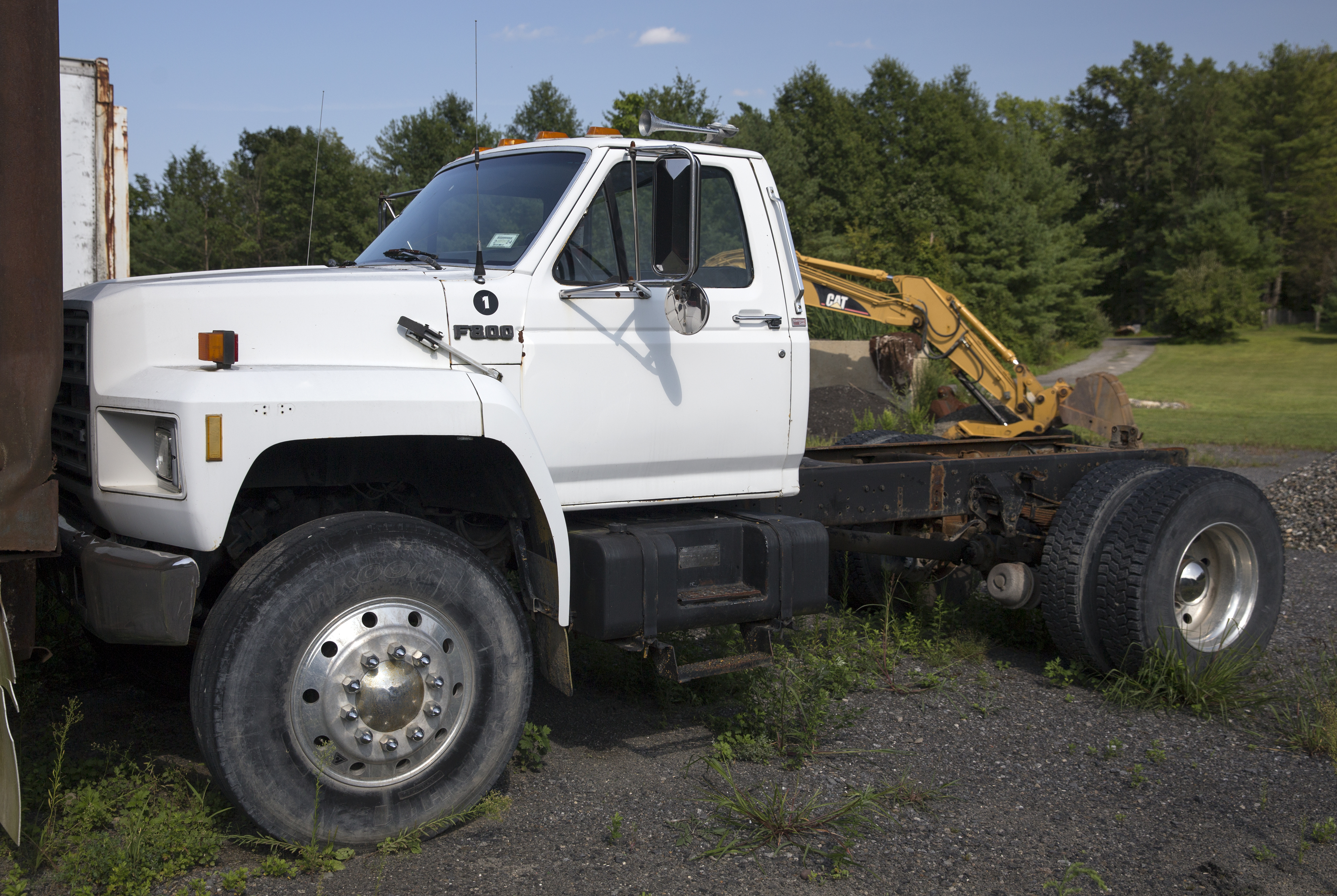
1987 Ford F-800 Custom Cab

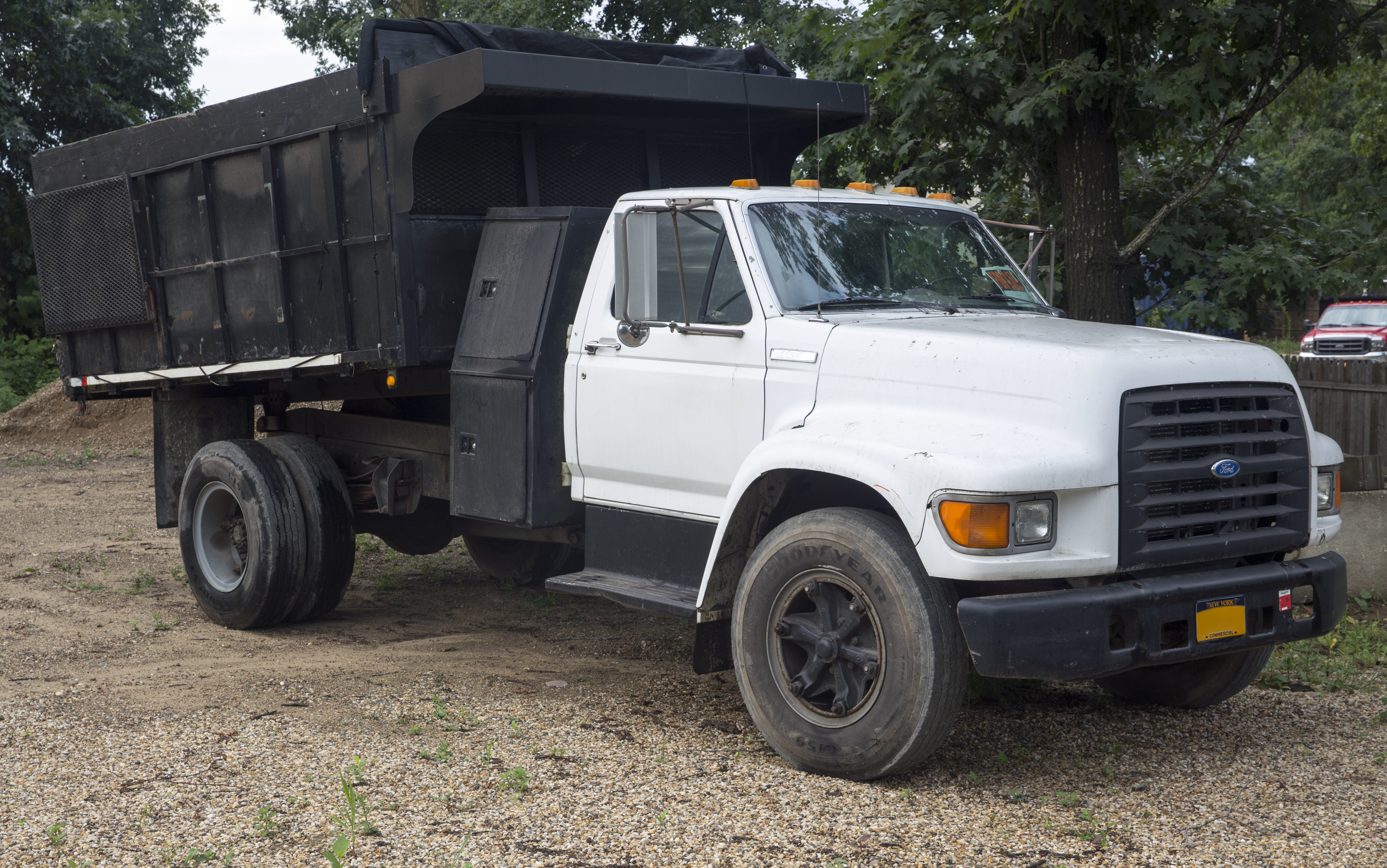
1995 Ford F-800 dump truck

=== Original design ===
For the 1980 model year, the medium-duty F-Series underwent its first complete redesign since 1967. As with its predecessor, the cab and interior were derived from the F-Series pickup trucks of the period, with medium-duty trucks adopting their own chassis, front fascia, drivetrain, and suspension. A two-door cab was standard, with a four-door crew cab offered as an option. The model range was carried over from the previous generation, with the F-600, F-700, and F-800; the B-Series denoted cowled bus chassis. The medium-duty F-series shared exterior styling derived from the larger L-Series trucks.

Shifting from the rectangular grille of the F-Series and Ranger to the trapezoidal grille of the L-Series conventional and CL-Series COE, the sixth-generation medium-duty F-Series trucks adopted a taller, narrower hoodline, requiring the return of separate fenders (for the first time since the 1957 "Big Job" trucks). A traditional rear-hinged hood was standard, but the optional forward-tilting hood (in the style of the larger L-Series trucks) quickly overtook it in popularity. As a running change during 1983 (for the 1984 model year), the medium-duty F-Series replaced "F O R D" with the Ford Blue Oval grille emblem, becoming the last Ford vehicle to do so.

At its launch, the medium-duty F-Series was offered with two gasoline V8 engines and two diesel V8 engines. A 370-cubic-inch (6.1 L), 180 hp (134 kW) V8 was standard, with an optional 429-cubic-inch (7.0 L) version; both were variants of the 460 V8 developed for commercial use. The 429 became standard for 1991. At its 1980 introduction, the standard diesel option was a 500.5-cubic-inch (8.2 L) Detroit Diesel "Fuel Pincher" V8 (for F-600 and F-700 trucks); the 635-cubic-inch (10.4 L) Caterpillar 3208 V8 made a return (redesignating F-800s as F-8000s). In 1985, Ford introduced inline-six diesel engines produced in a joint venture with New Holland in Brazil; 6.6 L and 7.8 L inline-sixes were phased in to replace the Detroit Diesel V8 and the Caterpillar 3208. In place of adding an extra "0" to the model designation, versions with the New Holland engines wore "Diesel" badging. In 1992, Ford introduced Cummins 5.9 L B-series and 8.3 L C-series straight-six diesels, phased in to replace the Ford–New Holland engines.

=== Facelift ===
During its 19-year production run, the sixth-generation medium-duty F-Series received few changes outside of powertrain revisions. After the 1984 logo change, the medium-duty F-Series did not have any exterior change (aside from engine badging) until 1995, when the forward-tilting hood was standardized with a more aerodynamic design; along with an enlarged grille, and the turn signals were relocated outboard of the headlamps. With the exception of its steering column, the medium-duty F-Series used the interior and dashboard of the 1980–1986 F-Series through its entire production.

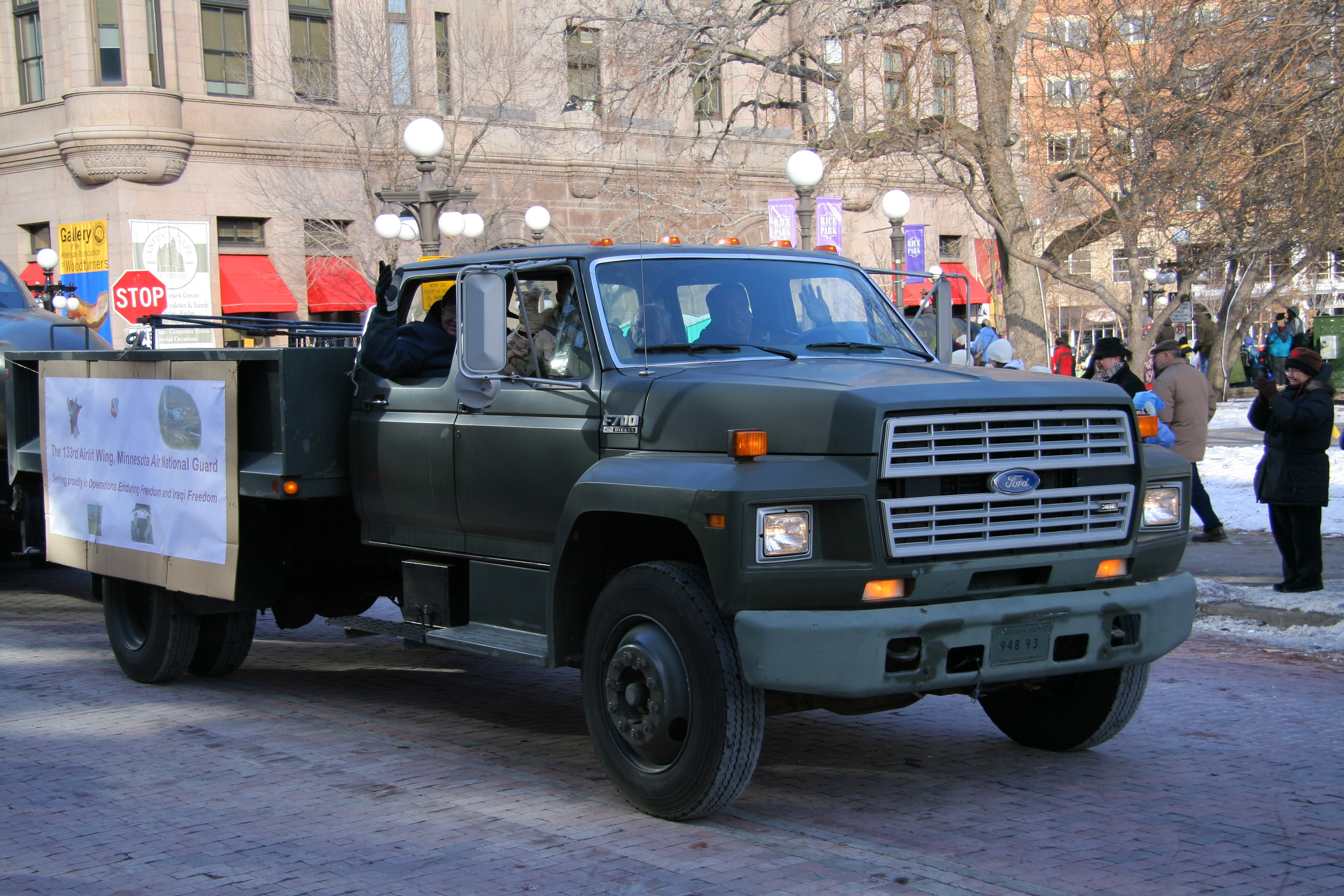
F-700 crew cab (mid- to late 1980s)

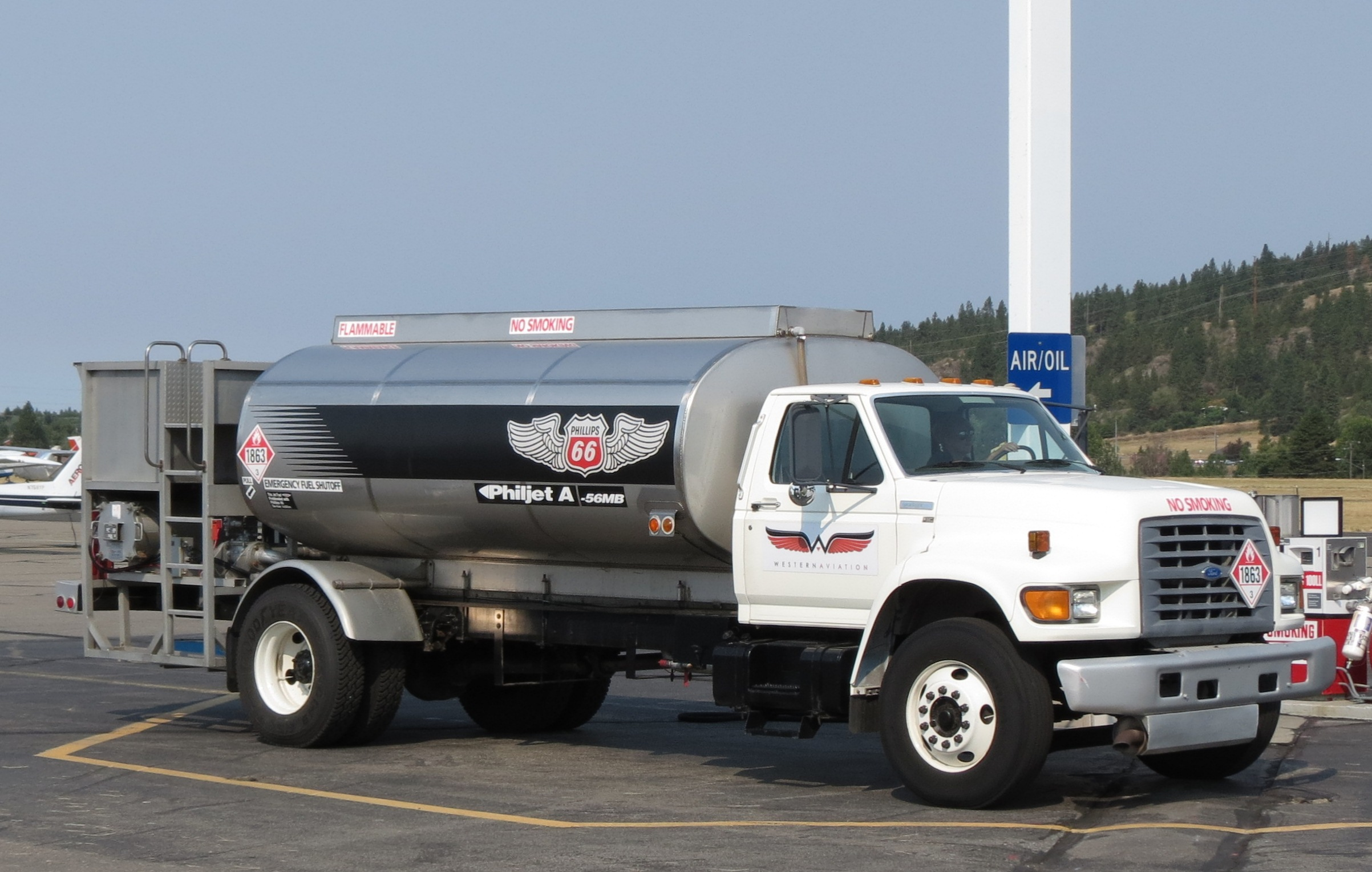
1995–1998 F800

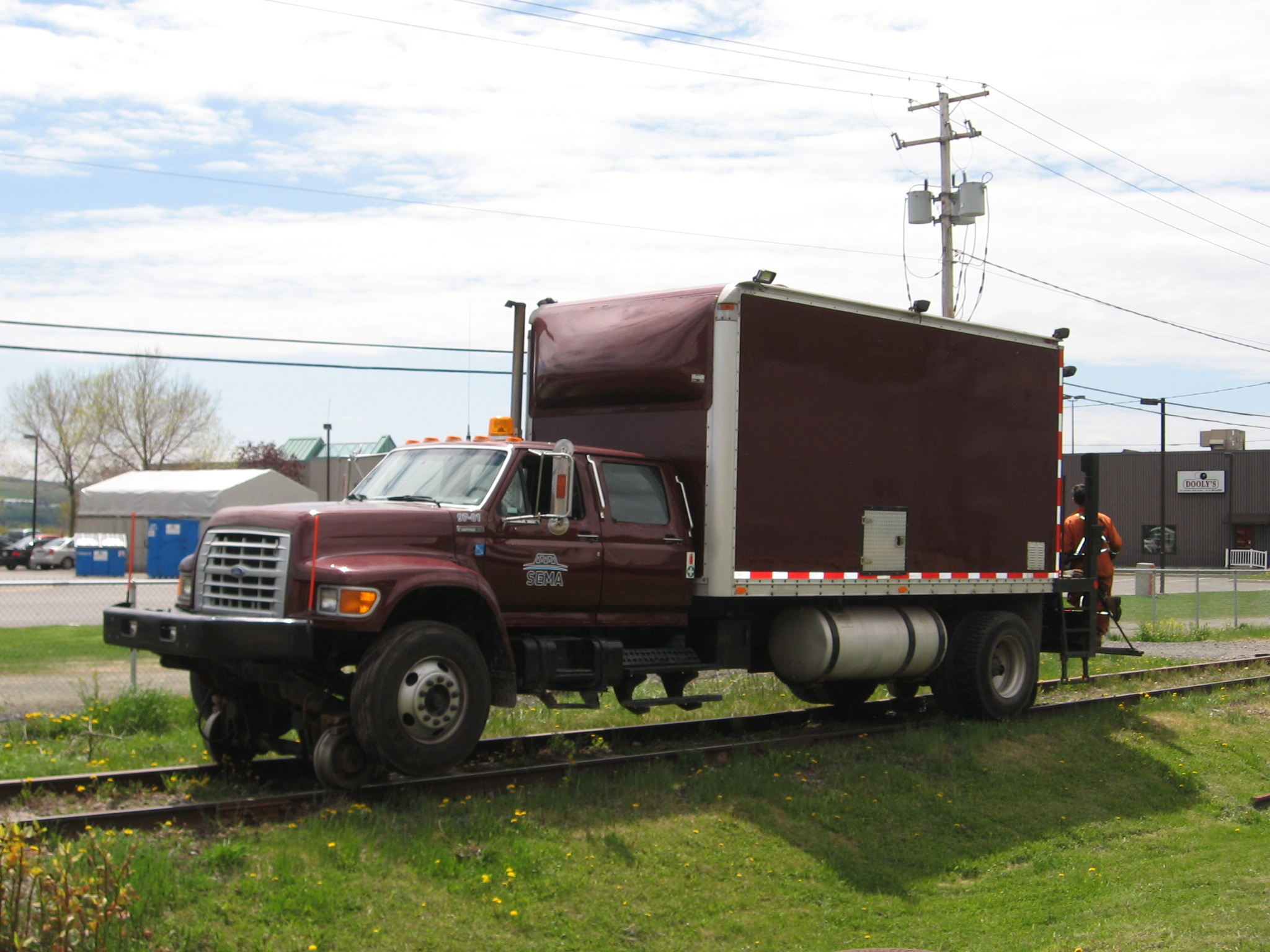
1997 F800 crew cab (rail-service truck)

== Seventh generation (2000–2015) ==
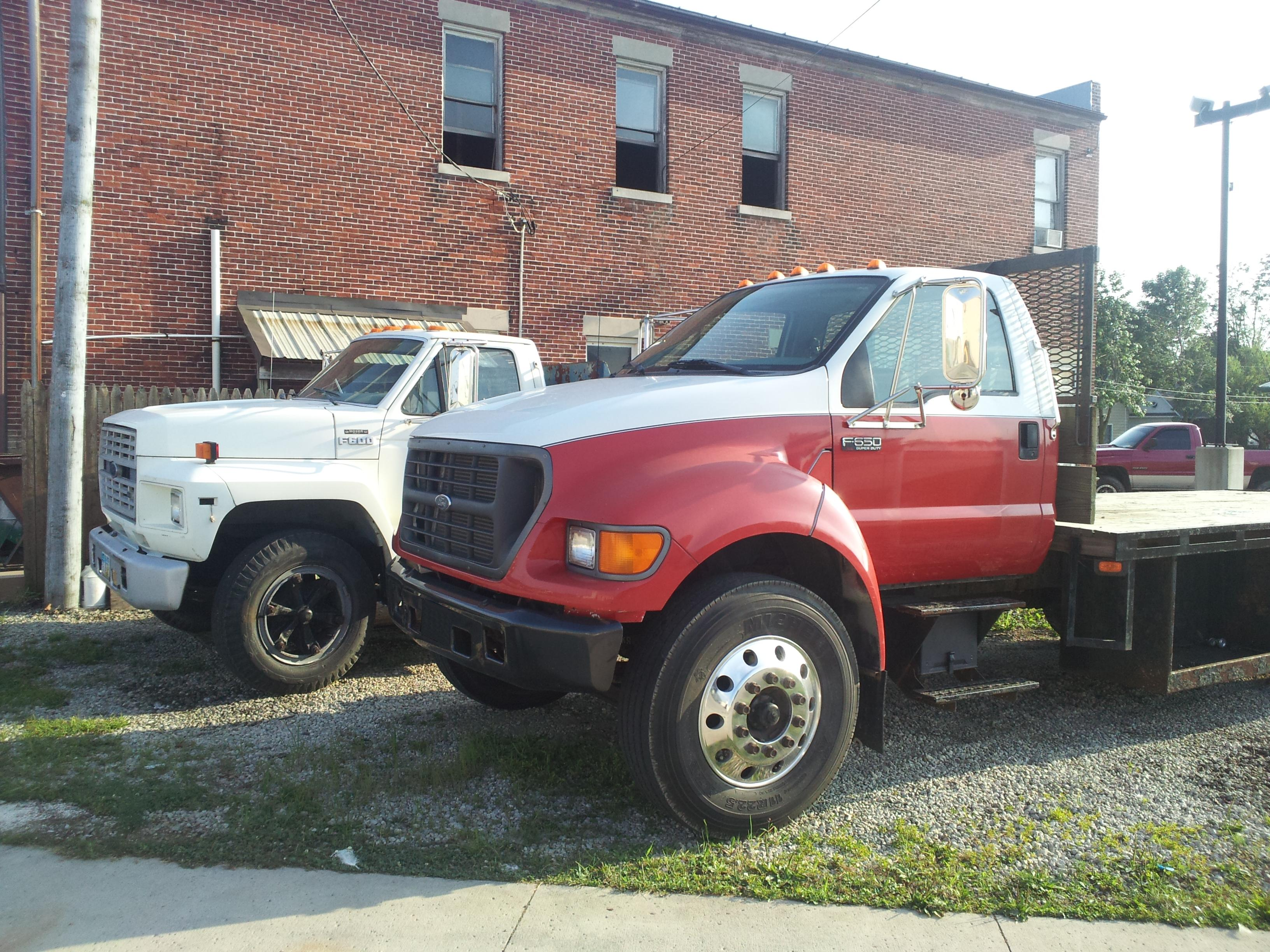
2002 Ford F-650 Super Duty alongside a 1989 Ford F-600

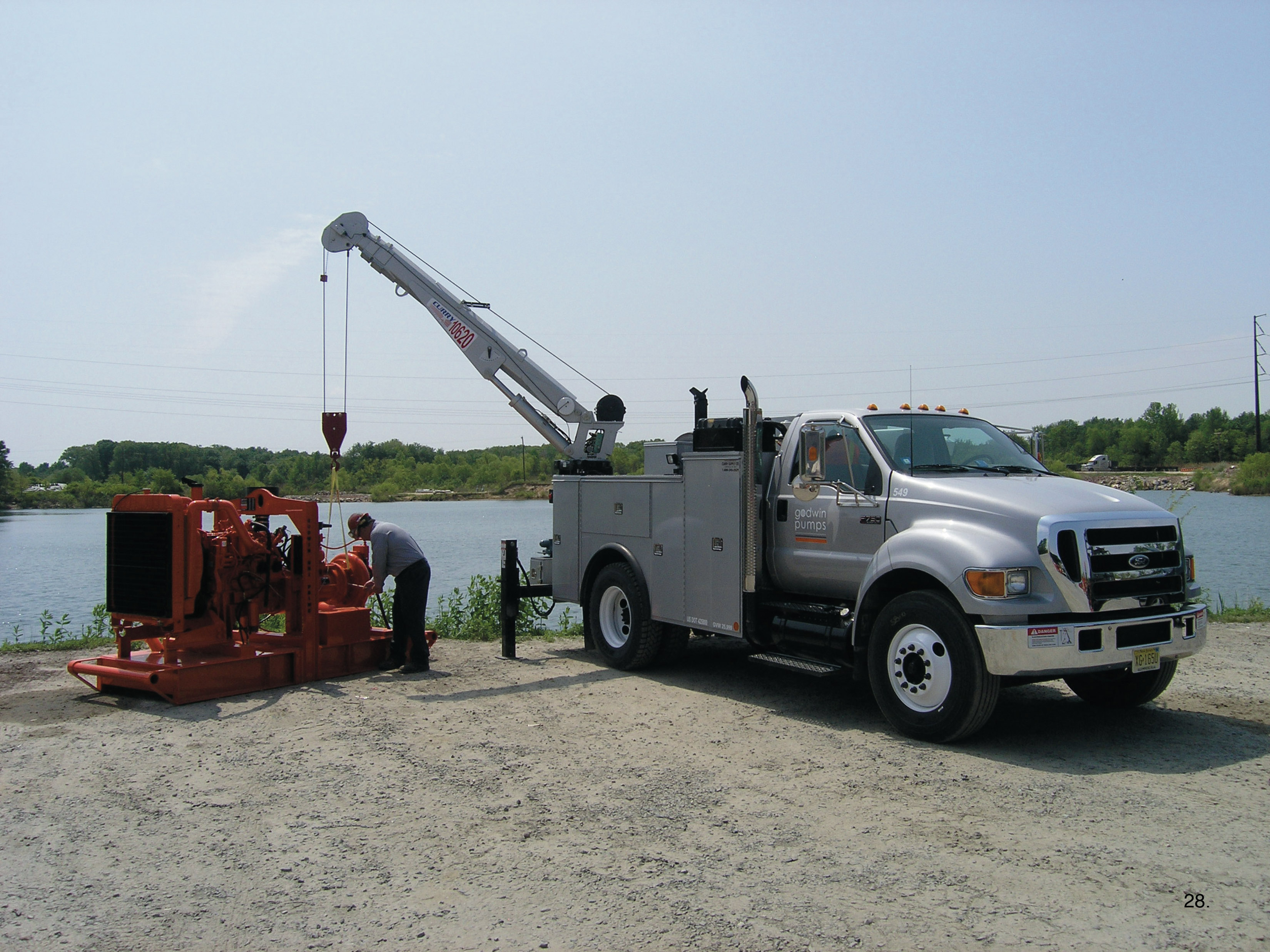
2004–2015 F-750 Super Duty in use servicing a water pump

For the 2000 model year, Ford introduced the seventh generation of its medium-duty truck line. Following the sale of the Aeromax/Louisville and Cargo heavy-truck ranges to Freightliner in 1997, these became the largest vehicles produced by Ford in North America. Following the 1999 split of the F-Series into light- and heavy-duty vehicles, medium-duty trucks became part of the Super Duty range. In another change, medium-duty trucks adopted the "x50" nomenclature used by Ford F-Series trucks since 1953, as the F-650 and F-750 Super Duty (the F-800 was dropped).

To decrease development costs on an all-new range of trucks, Ford entered into a joint venture with Navistar International, which sought to develop a replacement for the long-running International S-Series/4000-Series. Named Blue Diamond Truck Company LLC, the agreement produced medium-duty trucks for both manufacturers. While sharing a common chassis, Navistar and Ford sourced their bodywork separately; Navistar produced its own engines, while Ford used off-the-shelf powertrains. In 2000, Ford introduced the F-650/F-750 Super Duty, while International introduced the 4000-Series (later the DuraStar) in 2002. This is the last generation of the Ford F-Series Medium Duty to be built in collaboration with Navistar, as the next generation was made after 2015, the year Blue Diamond Truck dissolved.

Sharing its cab with the contemporary F-250 through F-550, and offered in both XL and XLT trims, the medium-duty Super Duty trucks were offered in two-door and four-door cabs; for the first time, a SuperCab configuration (2+2 doors) was offered for medium-duty trucks. Again produced with separate fenders, the only visible exterior parts shared with the previous generation were the headlight/turn signal clusters. The design of the trapezoidal grille was largely adapted from Super Duty pickup trucks, with two vertical intake slots bordering a square grille. For 2004, the exterior underwent its sole update, as the grille adopted the "three-slot grille" layout used across Ford vehicles. For 2012, the interior underwent its first revision, adopting the interior revision introduced for 2011 Super Duty pickup trucks.

=== Powertrain ===
At their launch, the F-650 and F-750 were available with the Caterpillar 3126 (replaced by the C7) 7.2L inline-six, the Cummins ISB 5.9L inline-six, and the Navistar-produced Ford-branded 7.3L Power Stroke V8 engine. The 6.0L Power Stroke replaced the aging (and no longer compliant with California noise regulations) 7.3L for the 2004 model year. For the 2010 model year, Caterpillar exited the on-highway diesel engine market, leaving Cummins as the sole engine choice. Expanded to 6.7 liters for 2007, the Cummins diesel comes with eight standard and optional horsepower ratings and two vocational ratings.

In 2012, Ford introduced gasoline and gaseous (propane) engines for medium-duty trucks. The 6.8L 30-valve Triton V10 produces 362 horsepower (270 kW) and 457 foot-pounds force (620 N⋅m) of torque and is mated to the TTC Spicer ES56-7B seven-speed manual.

Engine	Displacement	Bore x stroke	Horsepower @ rpm	Torque @ rpm	Governed speed
Diesel engines
Ford Power Stroke V8 (2000–2003)	444 cubic inches (7.3 litres)	4.11 in × 4.18 in (104 mm × 106 mm)	210 hp (157 kW) at 2,300 rpm	520 lb⋅ft (705 N⋅m) at 1,500 rpm	3000 rpm
Ford Power Stroke V8 (2000–2003)	444 cubic inches (7.3 litres)	4.11 in × 4.18 in (104 mm × 106 mm)	215 hp (160 kW) at 2,600 rpm	425 lb⋅ft (576 N⋅m) at 1,800 rpm	3000 rpm
Ford Power Stroke V8 (2000–2003)	444 cubic inches (7.3 litres)	4.11 in × 4.18 in (104 mm × 106 mm)	275 hp (205 kW) at 2,800 rpm	520 lb⋅ft (705 N⋅m) at 1,600 rpm	3000 rpm
Ford Power Stroke V8 (2004–2008)	365 cubic inches (6.0 litres)	3.74 in × 4.13 in (95 mm × 105 mm)	200 hp (149 kW) at rpm	520 lb⋅ft (705 N⋅m) at rpm	2800 rpm
Ford Power Stroke V8 (2004–2008)	365 cubic inches (6.0 litres)	3.74 in × 4.13 in (95 mm × 105 mm)	215 hp (160 kW) at rpm	540 lb⋅ft (732 N⋅m) at rpm	2800 rpm
Ford Power Stroke V8 (2004–2008)	365 cubic inches (6.0 litres)	3.74 in × 4.13 in (95 mm × 105 mm)	230 hp (172 kW) at rpm	540 lb⋅ft (732 N⋅m) at rpm	2800 rpm
Ford Power Stroke V8 (2004–2008)	365 cubic inches (6.0 litres)	3.74 in × 4.13 in (95 mm × 105 mm)	230 hp (172 kW) at 2,600 rpm	620 lb⋅ft (841 N⋅m) at 1,500 rpm	2800 rpm
Caterpillar 3126/C7 inline-6 (2000–2009)	441 cubic inches (7.2 litres)	4.33 in × 5.00 in (110 mm × 127 mm)	323 hp (241 kW) at 2,200 rpm	570 lb⋅ft (773 N⋅m) at 1,440 rpm	2500 rpm
Caterpillar 3126/C7 inline-6 (2000–2009)	441 cubic inches (7.2 litres)	4.33 in × 5.00 in (110 mm × 127 mm)	325 hp (242 kW) at 2,200 rpm	580 lb⋅ft (786 N⋅m) at 1,440 rpm	2500 rpm
Caterpillar 3126/C7 inline-6 (2000–2009)	441 cubic inches (7.2 litres)	4.33 in × 5.00 in (110 mm × 127 mm)	329 hp (245 kW) at 2,200 rpm	620 lb⋅ft (841 N⋅m) at 1,440 rpm	2500 rpm
Caterpillar 3126/C7 inline-6 (2000–2009)	441 cubic inches (7.2 litres)	4.33 in × 5.00 in (110 mm × 127 mm)	332 hp (248 kW) at 2,400 rpm	580 lb⋅ft (786 N⋅m) at 1,440 rpm	2500 rpm
Caterpillar 3126/C7 inline-6 (2000–2009)	441 cubic inches (7.2 litres)	4.33 in × 5.00 in (110 mm × 127 mm)	338 hp (252 kW) at 2,200 rpm	620 lb⋅ft (841 N⋅m) at 1,440 rpm	2500 rpm
Caterpillar 3126/C7 inline-6 (2000–2009)	441 cubic inches (7.2 litres)	4.33 in × 5.00 in (110 mm × 127 mm)	342 hp (255 kW) at 2,400 rpm	660 lb⋅ft (895 N⋅m) at 1,440 rpm	2400 rpm
Caterpillar 3126/C7 inline-6 (2000–2009)	441 cubic inches (7.2 litres)	4.33 in × 5.00 in (110 mm × 127 mm)	346 hp (258 kW) at 2,200 rpm	660 lb⋅ft (895 N⋅m) at 1,440 rpm	2400 rpm
Caterpillar 3126/C7 inline-6 (2000–2009)	441 cubic inches (7.2 litres)	4.33 in × 5.00 in (110 mm × 127 mm)	351 hp (262 kW) at 2,200 rpm	800 lb⋅ft (1,085 N⋅m) at 1,440 rpm	2400 rpm
Caterpillar 3126/C7 inline-6 (2000–2009)	441 cubic inches (7.2 litres)	4.33 in × 5.00 in (110 mm × 127 mm)	357 hp (266 kW) at 2,200 rpm	800 lb⋅ft (1,085 N⋅m) at 1,440 rpm	2400 rpm
Caterpillar 3126/C7 inline-6 (2000–2009)	441 cubic inches (7.2 litres)	4.33 in × 5.00 in (110 mm × 127 mm)	362 hp (270 kW) at 2,200 rpm	860 lb⋅ft (1,166 N⋅m) at 1,440 rpm	2400 rpm
Cummins ISB inline-6 (2000–2006)	359 cubic inches (5.9 litres)	4.02 in × 4.72 in (102 mm × 120 mm)	185 hp (138 kW) at 2,300 rpm	420 lb⋅ft (569 N⋅m) at 1,600 rpm	2500 rpm
Cummins ISB inline-6 (2000–2006)	359 cubic inches (5.9 litres)	4.02 in × 4.72 in (102 mm × 120 mm)	200 hp (149 kW) at 2,300 rpm	520 lb⋅ft (705 N⋅m) at 1,600 rpm	2500 rpm
Cummins ISB inline-6 (2000–2006)	359 cubic inches (5.9 litres)	4.02 in × 4.72 in (102 mm × 120 mm)	200 hp (149 kW) at 2,300 rpm	520 lb⋅ft (705 N⋅m) at 1,400 rpm	2600 rpm
Cummins ISB inline-6 (2000–2006)	359 cubic inches (5.9 litres)	4.02 in × 4.72 in (102 mm × 120 mm)	230 hp (172 kW) at 2,300 rpm	520 lb⋅ft (705 N⋅m) at 1,400 rpm	2600 rpm
Cummins ISB inline-6 (2000–2006)	359 cubic inches (5.9 litres)	4.02 in × 4.72 in (102 mm × 120 mm)	245 hp (183 kW) at 2,200 rpm	660 lb⋅ft (895 N⋅m) at 1,600 rpm	2500 rpm
Cummins ISB inline-6 (2000–2006)	359 cubic inches (5.9 litres)	4.02 in × 4.72 in (102 mm × 120 mm)	260 hp (194 kW) at 2,500 rpm	550 lb⋅ft (746 N⋅m) at 1,900 rpm	2600 rpm
Cummins ISB inline-6 (2000–2006)	359 cubic inches (5.9 litres)	4.02 in × 4.72 in (102 mm × 120 mm)	260 hp (194 kW) at 2,300 rpm	660 lb⋅ft (895 N⋅m) at 1,600 rpm	2500 rpm
Cummins ISB inline-6 (2000–2006)	359 cubic inches (5.9 litres)	4.02 in × 4.72 in (102 mm × 120 mm)	275 hp (205 kW) at 2,500 rpm	660 lb⋅ft (895 N⋅m) at 1,600 rpm	2600 rpm
Cummins ISB inline-6 (2007–2015)	408 cubic inches (6.7 litres)	4.21 in × 4.88 in (107 mm × 124 mm)	220 hp (164 kW) at 2,300 rpm	520 lb⋅ft (705 N⋅m) at 1,600 rpm	2600 rpm
Cummins ISB inline-6 (2007–2015)	408 cubic inches (6.7 litres)	4.21 in × 4.88 in (107 mm × 124 mm)	220 hp (164 kW) at 2,300 rpm	520 lb⋅ft (705 N⋅m) at 1,600 rpm	2600 rpm
Cummins ISB inline-6 (2007–2015)	408 cubic inches (6.7 litres)	4.21 in × 4.88 in (107 mm × 124 mm)	240 hp (179 kW) at 2,300 rpm	560 lb⋅ft (759 N⋅m) at 1,600 rpm	2600 rpm
Cummins ISB inline-6 (2007–2015)	408 cubic inches (6.7 litres)	4.21 in × 4.88 in (107 mm × 124 mm)	250 hp (186 kW) at 2,300 rpm	660 lb⋅ft (895 N⋅m) at 1,600 rpm	2600 rpm
Cummins ISB inline-6 (2007–2015)	408 cubic inches (6.7 litres)	4.21 in × 4.88 in (107 mm × 124 mm)	260 hp (194 kW) at 2,300 rpm	660 lb⋅ft (895 N⋅m) at 1,600 rpm	2600 rpm
Cummins ISB inline-6 (2007–2015)	408 cubic inches (6.7 litres)	4.21 in × 4.88 in (107 mm × 124 mm)	280 hp (209 kW) at 2,300 rpm	660 lb⋅ft (895 N⋅m) at 1,600 rpm	2600 rpm
Cummins ISB inline-6 (2007–2015)	408 cubic inches (6.7 litres)	4.21 in × 4.88 in (107 mm × 124 mm)	300 hp (224 kW) at 2,600 rpm	660 lb⋅ft (895 N⋅m) at 1,600 rpm	2600 rpm
Cummins ISB inline-6 (2007–2015)	408 cubic inches (6.7 litres)	4.21 in × 4.88 in (107 mm × 124 mm)	325 hp (242 kW) at 2,600 rpm	750 lb⋅ft (1,017 N⋅m) at 1,800 rpm	2600 rpm
Cummins ISB inline-6 (2007–2015)	408 cubic inches (6.7 litres)	4.21 in × 4.88 in (107 mm × 124 mm)	340 hp (254 kW) at 2,600 rpm	660 lb⋅ft (895 N⋅m) at 1,800 rpm	2600 rpm
Cummins ISB inline-6 (2007–2015)	408 cubic inches (6.7 litres)	4.21 in × 4.88 in (107 mm × 124 mm)	360 hp (268 kW) at 2,600 rpm	800 lb⋅ft (1,085 N⋅m) at 1,800 rpm	2600 rpm
Gasoline engines
Ford Modular V10 (2012–2015)	413 cubic inches (6.8 litres)	3.552 in × 4.165 in (90.2 mm × 105.8 mm)	362 hp (270 kW) at 4,750 rpm	457 lb⋅ft (620 N⋅m) at 3,250 rpm	5000 rpm

== Eighth generation (2016–present) ==
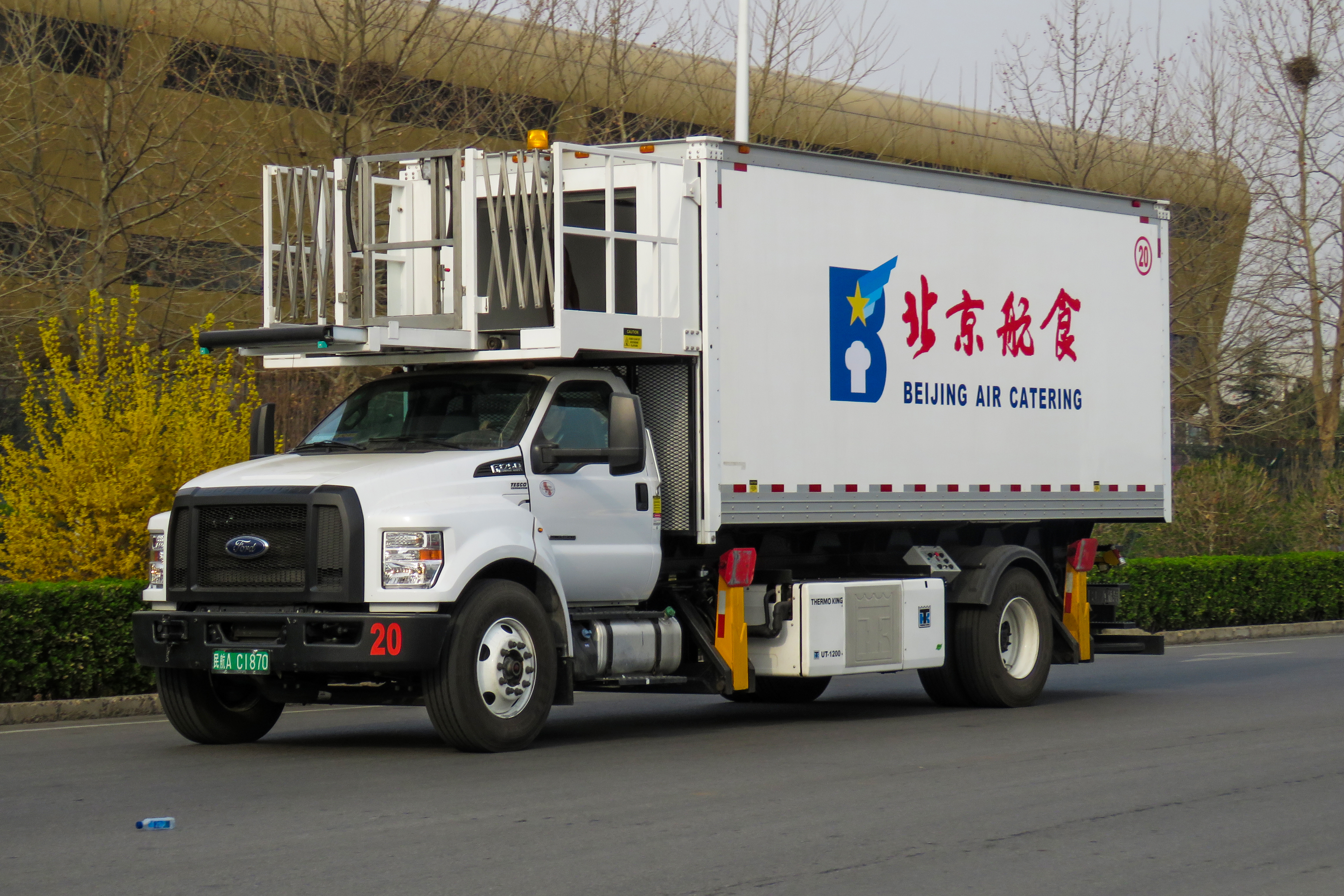
2016 F-750 catering truck of Beijing Air Catering Co., Ltd.

For the 2016 model year, Ford introduced an eighth generation of its medium-duty truck line. Following the 2015 dissolution of the Blue Diamond Truck joint venture, Ford shifted medium-duty truck production from Mexico to its Avon Lake, Ohio assembly plant, alongside E-Series cutaway van chassis and F-53/F-59 motorhome/commercial stripped chassis. As before, the F-650 and F-750 make a return, extending into the Class 7 range.

Sharing the cab with the previous generation, the eighth generation abandons the shared Blue Diamond chassis for an all-new chassis developed by Ford; the carryover cab design was largely chosen to accommodate the needs of body manufacturers. In another change, off-the-shelf powertrains were replaced by engines and transmissions produced by Ford. As a replacement for the Cummins diesel, the medium-duty trucks adopt the 6.7L Power Stroke V8 of the F-250/F-350 Super Duty pickup trucks. The 6.8L Triton V10 gasoline engine made its return, with an option for conversion to propane or compressed natural gas (CNG). The six-speed 6R140 automatic transmission is the sole transmission for both engines; no manual transmission is offered.

As before, the medium-duty range is offered in two-door, four-door, and SuperCab (2+2 door) cab configurations. The fenders and hoodline are revised slightly; the standard mesh grille abandons the three-slot configuration, centering the Ford Blue Oval emblem alone. The model line shares its headlights with the E-Series and hood vents with the 2011–2016 Super Duty (F-250 through F-550).

For 2021 production, the V10 was replaced by a 7.3L V8, paired with a six-speed automatic transmission. Ford reintroduced the F-600, a heavier-duty version of the F-550, which is equipped with more reinforced U-joints, frame, and front axle and powertrain of the medium-duty F-650 while using the aluminum cab structure and frame design of the F-250 through F-550.

== See also ==
- Ford F-Series
- List of Ford vehicles
- Ford Super Duty
