= Blanca Judith Díaz Delgado =

Mexican politician

Senator of the Republic
- Incumbent
- Assumed office 1 September 2024
- Preceded by: Indira Kempis Martínez
- Constituency: Nuevo León
- In office 1 September 2006 – 24 May 2012
- Preceded by: Eduardo Arias Aparicio
- Succeeded by: Mario Garza Guevara
- Constituency: Nuevo León

Personal details
- Born: 22 February 1958 (age 68) Mexico City, Mexico
- Party: Morena (since 2015)
- Other political affiliations: National Action Party (1996–2015)
- Education: UANL

Blanca Judith Díaz Delgado (born 22 February 1958) is a Mexican politician serving since 2024 as a senator from Nuevo León, having previously held the position from 2006 to 2012. A member of Morena and formerly of the National Action Party, she served in the Congress of Nuevo León from 1997 to 2000 and in the Chamber of Deputies from 2003 to 2006.
