= José Luis Murillo Torres =

Mexican politician

- Born: 24 February 1957 (age 69); San Nicolás de los Garza, Nuevo León, Mexico
- Occupation: Politician
- Political party: PAN

José Luis Murillo Torres (born 24 February 1957) is a Mexican politician affiliated with the National Action Party (PAN). In the 2006 general election he was elected to the Chamber of Deputies to represent Nuevo León's 3rd district during the 60th session of Congress.
