= Indira Kempis Martínez =

Mexican politician (born 1982)

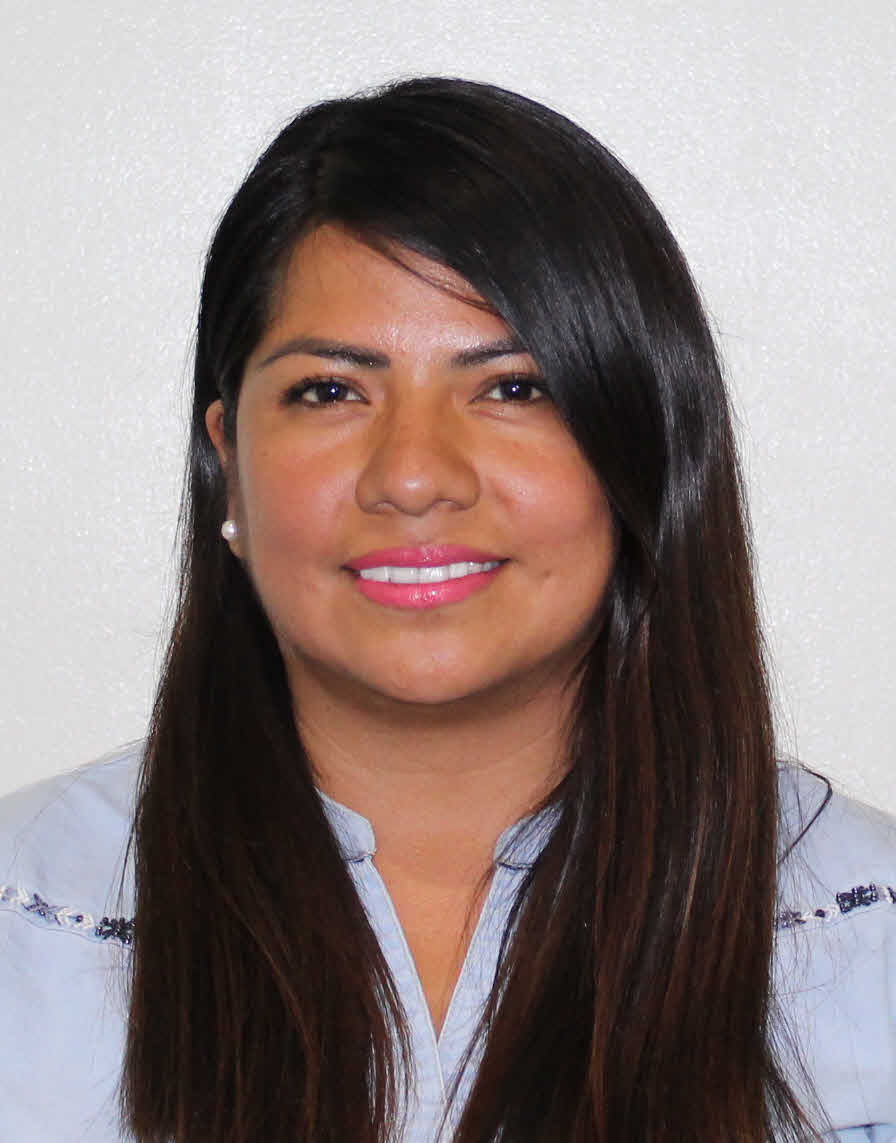

Senator of the Republic
- In office 1 September 2018 – 31 August 2024
- Preceded by: Ivonne Álvarez
- Succeeded by: Blanca Judith Díaz Delgado
- Constituency: Nuevo León

Personal details
- Born: 22 August 1982 (age 43) Cuautla, Morelos, Mexico
- Party: Institutional Revolutionary Party (since 2024)
- Other political affiliations: Citizens' Movement (2018–2023)
- Occupation: Politician

Indira Kempis Martínez (born 22 August 1982) is a Mexican politician who served as a senator from Nuevo León from 2018 to 2024. A former member of Citizens' Movement (MC), Kempis became an independent in December 2023. In January 2024, she joined the Institutional Revolutionary Party (PRI) as a senator within their caucus.

Inspired by El Salvador's adoption of Bitcoin, Kempis has been a strong supporter of adopting Bitcoin as legal tender. She has stated that, "Making bitcoin a legal tender means putting a level playing field for people who are excluded in almost all countries."

Born in Cuautla, Morelos, Kempis obtained her communications degree from ITESM and subsequently earned a master's degree in public administration and policy. In 2018, she was elected to the Senate, and in 2023, she unsuccessfully contended for her party's presidential nomination for the 2024 election.
