= 2009 Nuevo León state election =

2009 Nuevo León gubernatorial election
- July 9, 2009
- Turnout: 54.61%
Candidate	Rodrigo Medina de la Cruz	Fernando Elizondo Barragán
Party	PRI	PAN
Alliance	PVEM
Popular vote	859,442	760,745
Percentage	49.01%	43.38%

A local election was held in the Mexican state of Nuevo León on Sunday, July 5, 2009, to elect, on the local level:

- Governor of Nuevo León to serve for an eight-year term, ineligible for reelection.
- 51 municipal presidents (mayors) to serve for three-year terms.
- 42 local deputies (26 by first-past-the-post and 16 by proportional representation) to serve for three-year terms in the Congress of Nuevo León.

== Gubernatorial election ==
Gubernatorial Results
Candidate	Party/Alliance	Votes	%
Rodrigo Medina de la Cruz	Institutional Revolutionary Party	859,442	49.01
Fernando Elizondo Barragán	National Action Party	790,745	43.38
Martha Zamarripa Rivas	Party of the Democratic Revolution	59,520	3.39
Guillermo Beltrán Pérez	New Alliance Party	26,300	1.50
Ernesto Villarreal Landeros	Social Democratic Party	5,683	0.32
