= Clara Luz Flores =

Mexican politician

Flores in 2019

Clara Luz Flores Carrales (born 27 January 1974) is a Mexican lawyer and politician, member of the National Regeneration Movement (Morena). Born in Monclova, Coahuila, she served as municipal president of General Escobedo Municipality, Nuevo León, from 2009 to 2012 and from 2015 to 2020 as member of the Institutional Revolutionary Party. Additionally, she worked as the Executive Secretary of the National Public Safety System and as a member of the Chamber of Deputies representing Nuevo León. In 2021, she ran for governor of Nuevo León, but her association with the NXIVM cult ultimately caused her to lose popularity. That same year, she filed a complaint of gender-based violence against a comedian who had made a parody of her, sparking criticism over censorship.

In 2026, Morena announced her as the "state coordinator for the defense of the transformation and national sovereignty", a position expected to represent the party in the Nuevo León gubernatorial election of 6 June 2027.
