= Adalberto Madero =

Mexican lawyer and politician

Municipal president of Monterrey
- In office 1 November 2006 – 31 October 2009
- Preceded by: Ricardo Canavati Tafich
- Succeeded by: Fernando Larrazábal Bretón

Member of the Senate of the Republic
- In office 1 September 2000 – 31 August 2006
- Preceded by: Eloy Cantú Segovia
- Succeeded by: Fernando Elizondo Barragán
- Constituency: Nuevo León
Other legislative positions
Member of the Congress of Nuevo León
In office 1 September 1997 – 31 August 2000
Preceded by	Marco Antonio García Villarreal
Succeeded by	Humberto Treviño Landois
Constituency	6th district

Personal details
- Born: Adalberto Arturo Madero Quiroga; 25 September 1969 (age 57) Monterrey, Nuevo León, Mexico
- Party: Independent (2024–present)
- Other political affiliations: Partido Esperanza Social (2023–2024); Ecologist Green Party of Mexico (2018–2023); National Action Party (1995–2018)
- Education: Universidad Regiomontana
- Occupation: Lawyer, politician

Adalberto Arturo Madero Quiroga (born 25 September 1969), also known as "Maderito", is a Mexican lawyer and right-wing politician from Nuevo León who has served in the upper house of the Mexican Congress. He was the municipal president of Monterrey from 2006 to 2009.

== Personal life and education ==
Madero is the son of Armando Arturo Madero Almada and Nieves Quiroga de Madero. He studied law at the Universidad Regiomontana. He has speech disfluency problems.

== Political career ==
Madero is a member of the National Action Party (PAN). He has been legal advisor to various PAN public servants in his native Nuevo León and has occupied different positions inside his party including Undersecretary of Finance.

He served as a local deputy in the LXVIII Legislature of the Congress of Nuevo León from 1997 to 2000. In 2000 he became one of the youngest senators to serve in Congress. In 2006 he won the elections for municipal president of Monterrey defeating the Institutional Revolutionary Party (PRI) candidate Abel Guerra.
