= General Escobedo =

- City and municipality
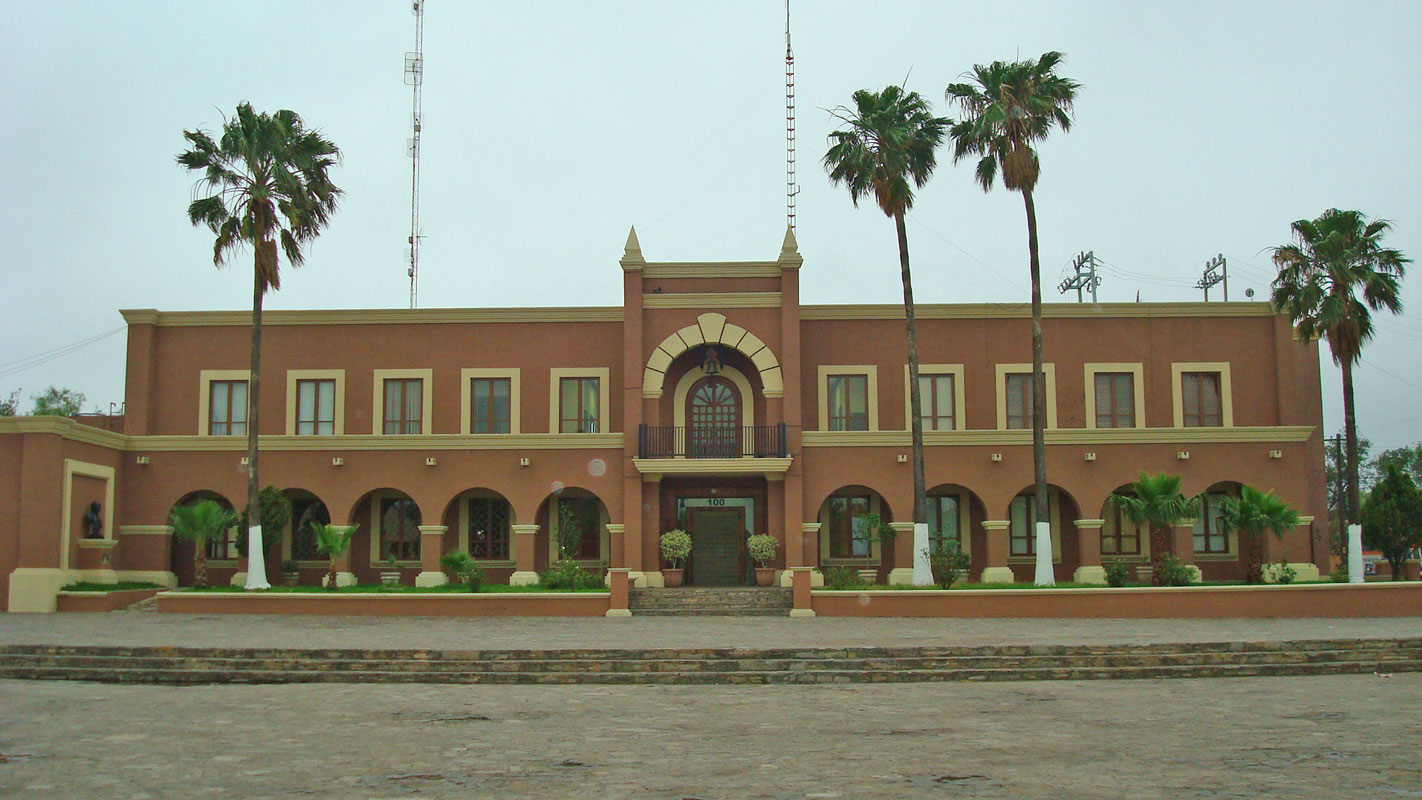
- Palacio Municipal

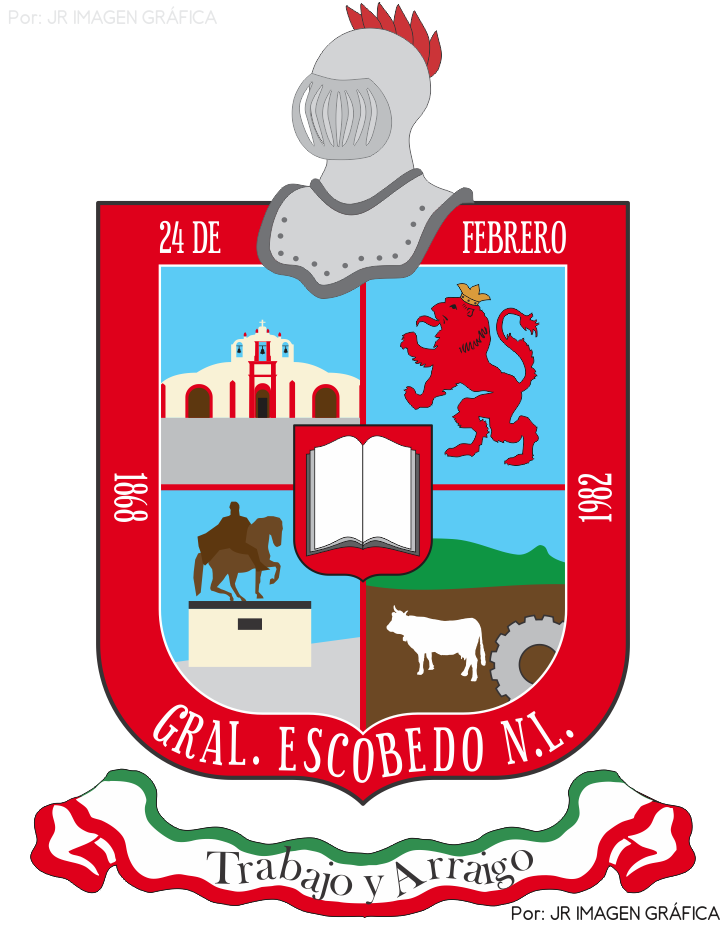
- Coat of arms
- Nickname: Escobedo
- Motto: Trabajo y Arraigo
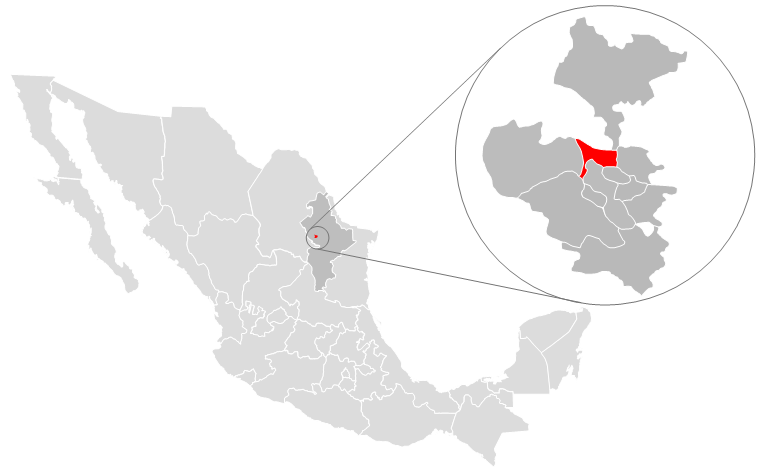
- Coordinates: 25°47′36″N 100°9′30″W
- Country: Mexico
- State: Nuevo León
- Founded: April 25, 1604

Government
  - Mayor: Andres Mijes Concepcion Llovera (MORENA)
  - Federal electoral district: NL-3 & NL-4

Area
  - City: 70.86 km^{2} (27.36 sq mi)
  - Municipality: 149.4 km^{2} (57.7 sq mi)
- Elevation: 510 m (1,670 ft)

Population (2020 census)
  - City: 454,967
  - Density: 6,421/km^{2} (16,630/sq mi)
  - Metro: 5,341,177
  - Municipality: 481,213
  - Municipality density: 3,221/km^{2} (8,342/sq mi)
- Time zone: UTC-6 (Zona Centro)
- Postal code: Postal code
- Website: www.escobedo.gob.mx

General Escobedo, or simply Escobedo, is a city and municipality in Nuevo León, Mexico, that is part of the Monterrey Metropolitan area. As of the census of 2005, the population was 295,131 in the city and 299,364 in the municipality. The municipality has an area of around 149 km^{2} (58 sq mi) and shares borders to the south with San Nicolás de los Garza, Monterrey and Santa Catarina; to the north with Hidalgo and El Carmen; to the east with Apodaca and Salinas Victoria; and to the west with García. Escobedo is also the home of the Mexican Army's 7th Military Zone Army Base.

== Origin of the name ==
The city was named after the General Mariano Escobedo.

Escobedo was known as "Topo de los Ayala" and was under Monterrey's jurisdiction in 1830, it was until 1867 that it was separated from the San Nicolás de los Garza municipality under governor Jerónimo Treviño and was thus decreed on February 24, 1868, becoming the "Villa de Gral. Escobedo".

== History ==
The land was originally known as "Los Llanos del Topo" (Hills of the Topo). The first owner of these lands was Captain José de Treviño, who was granted the territory on April 25, 1604, by Gov. Diego de Montemayor. Although Treviño was the original owner, the city itself was established by his son José de Ayala with the "Hacienda del Topo de San Nicolas Tolentino" by the time known as "Topo de los Ayala" or "Topo Grande", not to be confused with "Topo de los Gonzalez" or "Topo Chico".

In recent years Escobedo has undergone major growth, with many urban projects like shopping malls and the expansion of the Escobedo Industrial Park.The town was the location of Blue Diamond Trucks, a joint venture between Navistar and Ford Motor Company, until that company was dissolved in 2009.

The population in year 2005 in General Escobedo was 295,131 people, 148,835 men and 146,296 women. It was the 5th most populous city in the state, representing 7.03% of the total population.

This is due to the exponential growth on expansion on commerce, neighborhoods and Industries along the municipality, Escobedo along Apodaca N.L. are the two municipalities with the biggest growth in recent years

== Sister City ==
General Escobedo has one sister city.:

- (United States) - Pharr, Texas, USA
