= Congress of Nuevo León =

Legislature of Nuevo León, Mexico

Honorable Congress of the State of Nuevo León Honorable Congreso del Estado de Nuevo León
- LXXVII legislature

Type
- Type: Unicameral
- Term limits: 4 consecutive terms

History
- Founded: 1 August 1824
- New session started: 1 September 2024

Leadership
- President: Lorena de la Garza, PRI
- First Vice President: Grecia Benavides Flores, MORENA
- Second Vice President: Claudia Mayela Chapa Marmolejot, PVEM

Structure
- Seats: 42
- Political groups: PAN (10); PRI (10); MC (9); MORENA (9); PVEM (1); PT (1); PRD (1); Independents (1)
- Length of term: 3 years

Elections
- Voting system: Parallel voting 26 seats elected by first-past-the-post 16 seats elected by proportional representation
- Last election: 2 June 2024
- Next election: 6 June 2027

Meeting place
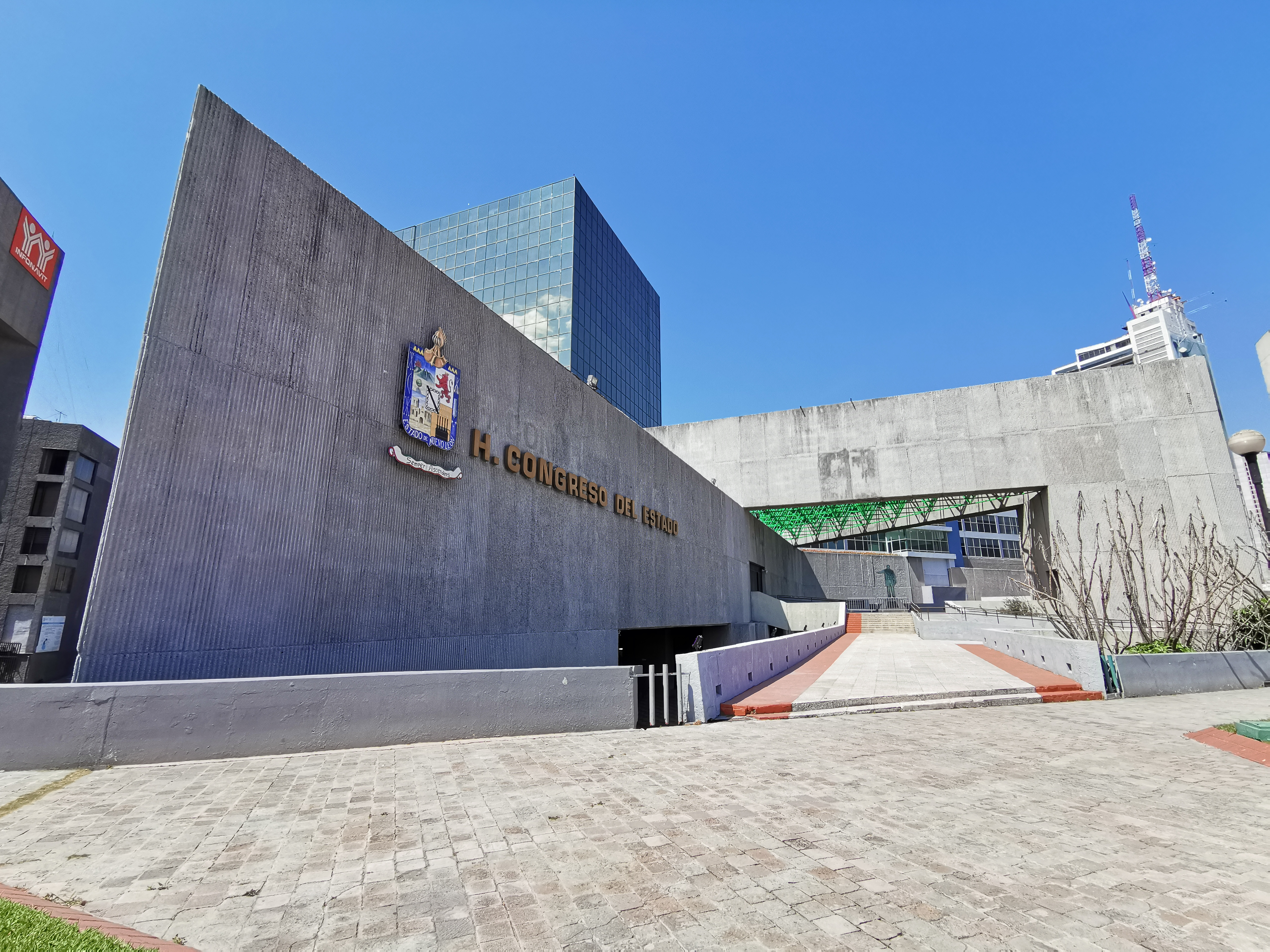
- Legislative Palace, Monterrey, Mexico

Website
- www.hcnl.gob.mx

The Honorable Congress of the State of Nuevo León (Spanish: Honorable Congreso del Estado de Nuevo León) is the unicameral legislature of the government of the Mexican state of Nuevo León. Each three-year legislative term consists of 42 deputies, with 26 elected through relative majority and 16 through proportional representation.

The current legislative term, known as the LXXVII Legislature, started in 2024 and concludes in 2027 following the local elections.

== History ==
On 7 May 1824, the Constituent Congress of Mexico officially recognized Nuevo León as a state, ordering the state to hold elections to select deputies that would serve both the Congress and Constituent Congress of Nuevo León. On 9 July 1824, 11 deputies were elected. The first legislative session started on 1 August 1824, with the goal of drafting the state's constitution, which was approved on 5 March 1825.

In March 1835, amid escalating tensions between centralists and federalists, the Federal Congress adopted a centralist constitution, which dissolved the state congresses, including the Congress of Nuevo León, replacing them with departmental boards. On 23 November 1846, a decree reinstated sovereignty to Nuevo León in accordance with the provisions outlined in the 1824 Mexican Constitution and the 1825 Nuevo León State Constitution, which led to the formal reestablishment of the Congress of Nuevo León on 3 January 1848.

In 1917, Nuevo León adopted a new state constitution establishing a two-year term for deputies, prohibiting re-election, and requiring the election of 15 deputies through first-past-the-post voting. In 1942, an amendment extended the term to three years. In 1977, reforms introduced proportional representation, facilitating the inclusion of smaller parties. The first opposition party deputy, from the National Action Party, was elected in 1979 under this new system. Prior to this, the Institutional Revolutionary Party was the only party in the legislature. In 2014, an amendment permitted the re-election of deputies for a maximum of four consecutive terms.

From 1901 until 1985, the congress convened in a designated room within the Government Palace. In May 1985, the legislative body relocated to the Legislative Palace, which presently serves as its official meeting venue.

== Membership ==
=== Eligibility requirements ===
Article 71 of the Nuevo León Constitution establishes eligibility criteria for deputies. Each deputy must meet the following requirements:

- Be a Mexican citizen by birth, exercising civil and political rights.
- Have reached the age of twenty-one on election day.
- Be a resident of the state for at least five consecutive years immediately preceding the election, or six months for those born in the state.
- Not be a religious minister.
- Not be the head of any department or head of any decentralized entity in the state.
- Not be a sitting governor.
- Not be a sitting judge.
- Not be working in any election commission.
- Not be a federal legislator.
- Not be a municipal president.
- Not be in the military or a head of public security forces for six months prior to the election.

Article 71 also notes that public servants mentioned in the eligibility criteria, with the exception of the state governor and members of any election commission, may be elected as deputies if they take a leave from the office they represent at least one day before their campaign starts.

=== Terms ===
Article 68 states that a deputy serves for three-year terms, which corresponds with one legislative term, known as a Legislature. A term starts on September 1 of the election year.

=== Elections ===
Article 69 outlines that the congress must consist of 26 deputies elected through first-past-the-post voting, with each deputy representing one single-member district, and an additional 16 deputies through proportional representation. For this process, political parties present lists of candidates at the state level, and the number of seats a party receives is proportional to the overall votes it receives statewide.

Article 72 allows deputies to be re-elected for up to four consecutive terms.

== Makeup ==
Congressional districts after the 2024 election

=== Party summary ===
Party	Start of legislature	Current seats	±
National Action Party	10	10	Steady
Institutional Revolutionary Party	10	10	Steady
Citizens' Movement	10	9	▼1
National Regeneration Movement	9	9	Steady
Party of the Democratic Revolution	1	1	Steady
Ecologist Green Party of Mexico	1	1	Steady
Labor Party	1	1	Steady
Independents / No party	0	1	▲1
Total	42	42	

=== Members ===
==== Elected by district ====
01 ▌ Ivonne Liliana Álvarez García (PRI)
02 ▌ Rafael Eduardo Ramos de la Garza (PRI)
03 ▌ Myrna Isela Grimaldo Iracheta (PAN)
04 ▌ Ana Melisa Peña Villagómez (MC)
05 ▌ Gabriela Govea López (PRI)
06 ▌ Perla de los Ángeles Villarreal Valdez (PRD)
07 ▌ José Filiberto Flores Elizondo (PRI)
08 ▌ Lorena de la Garza Venecia (PRI)
09 ▌ Mauro Guerra Villarreal (PAN)
10 ▌ Carlos Alberto de la Fuente Flores (PAN)
11 ▌ Baltazar Gilberto Martínez Ríos (MC)
12 ▌ Mario Alejandro Soto Esquer (MORENA)
13 ▌ Jesús Alberto Elizondo Salazar (MORENA)
14 ▌ José Luis Garza Garza (MC)
15 ▌ Itzel Soledad Castillo Almanza (PAN)
16 ▌ Elsa Escobedo Vázquez (PRI)
17 ▌ Anylú Bendición Hernández Sepúlveda (MORENA)
18 ▌ Claudia Gabriela Caballero Chávez (PAN)
19 ▌ Miguel Ángel García Lechuga (PAN)
20 ▌ Greta Pamela Barra Hernández (MORENA)
21 ▌ Armando Víctor Gutiérrez Canales (MC)
22 ▌ Mario Alberto Salinas Treviño (MC)
23 ▌▌ Rocío Maybe Montalvo Adame (No party)
24 ▌ Javier Caballero Gaona (PRI)
25 ▌ Brenda Velázquez Valdez (MORENA)
26 ▌ Aile Tamez de la Paz (PAN)

==== Elected by proportional representation ====
▌ Ignacio Castellanos Amaya (PAN)
▌ Cecilia Sofía Robledo Suárez (PAN)
▌ José Luis Santos Martínez (PAN)
▌ Heriberto Treviño Cantú (PRI)
▌ José Manuel Valdez Salazar (PRI)
▌ Armida Serrato Flores (PRI)
▌ María Guadalupe Rodríguez Martínez (PT)
▌ Claudia Mayela Chapa Marmolejo (PVEM)
▌ Miguel Ángel Flores Serna (MC)
▌ Paola Cristina Linares López (MC)
▌ Marisol González Elías (MC)
▌ Sandra Elizabeth Pámanes Ortiz (MC)
▌ Esther Berenice Martínez Díaz (MORENA)
▌ Reyna Reyes Molina (MORENA)
▌ Grecia Benavides Flores (MORENA)
▌ Tomás Roberto Montoya Díaz (MORENA)

== Historical composition ==
This chart shows the historical composition of the Congress of Nuevo León from the 62nd Legislature to the present. It reflects the party affiliations of deputies at the time of their election and does not account for subsequent party switching.

Congress of Nuevo León, 1979 to present

PAN / PRI / PPS / PARM / PST / PDM / PRD / PT / PVEM / MC / PANAL / MORENA / PES			Total
62nd	1979	1 / 2 / 14 / 3	20
63rd	1982	1 / 1 / 1 / 21 / 3 / 1	28
64th	1985	1 / 2 / 2 / 24 / 4 / 1	34
65th	1988	26 / 14	40
66th	1991	1 / 26 / 13	40
67th	1994	2 / 1 / 22 / 17	42
68th	1997	2 / 2 / 14 / 24	42
69th	2000	2 / 1 / 16 / 23	42
70th	2003	3 / 1 / 1 / 23 / 3 / 11	42
71st	2006	1 / 1 / 2 / 16 / 22	42
72nd	2009	1 / 1 / 2 / 20 / 1 / 17	42
73rd	2012	2 / 2 / 3 / 14 / 21	42
74th	2015	1 / 3 / 1 / 16 / 2 / 19	42
75th	2018	4 / 8 / 4 / 1 / 6 / 1 / 15 / 3	42
76th	2021	3 / 6 / 2 / 14 / 2 / 15	42
77th	2024	1 / 9 / 3 / 10 / 8 / 1 / 10	42

== See also ==
- List of Mexican state congresses
