= Alberto del Canto =

Portuguese explorer

Capt. Alberto del Canto
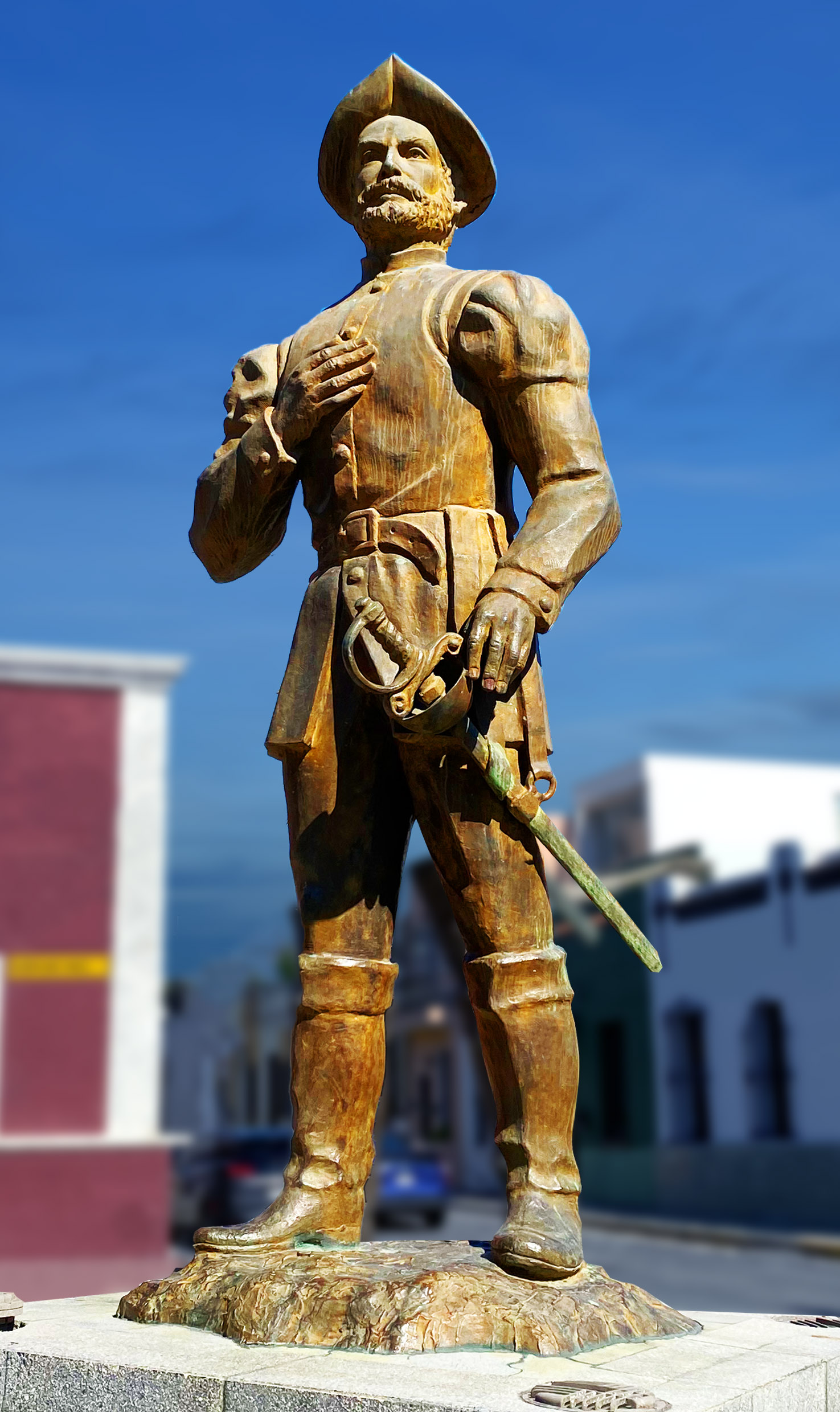
- Born: c. 1547; Terceira Island, Azores, Portugal
- Died: December 10, 1611 (aged c. 64)
- Spouse: Estefanía de Montemayor (married 1586–?)
- Children: Miguel de Montemayor (b. 1587); Diego de Montemayor (b. 1589); Elvira de Montemayor
- Parent(s): Sebastião Martins do Canto and Maria Dias de Vieira

Alberto del Canto (c. 1547 – 1611), formally Alberto Vieira do Canto, was a Portuguese noble, military captain, and conquistador who explored northern Mexico on behalf of the Spanish Empire, where he was the founder of several cities for the Viceroy of New Spain.

== Biographical synthesis ==
=== Birth and youth ===
In 1547 he was born in Praia da Vitória of the Azores, son of Mr. Sebastião Martins do Canto and Mrs. Maria Dias de Vieira.

== Foundations in North America ==
=== Trip to America ===
It is not clear how and when he arrived in New Spain. Some authors say that he embarked from the Islands of Castile in 1562.

However, there is certainty of his presence in 1562 in New Spain in Zacatecas to the region of San Martín and Mazapil since he was recruited by Francisco de Ibarra. which was part of the early explorations of the newly established Nueva Vizcaya 1554. He was definitely not part of the other group of explorers from the east entering through Tampico with the Carbajal and de la Cueva group in 1560.

In search for fortune in mines Alberto del Canto in December 1562, at the age of sixteen, was one of the 170 soldiers recruited in Zacatecas by Francisco de Ibarra, with the authorization of Luis de Velasco and Ruiz de Alarcón, to conquer the Northeast of New Spain with settlers from the Zacatecas ranches.

=== Explorations ===
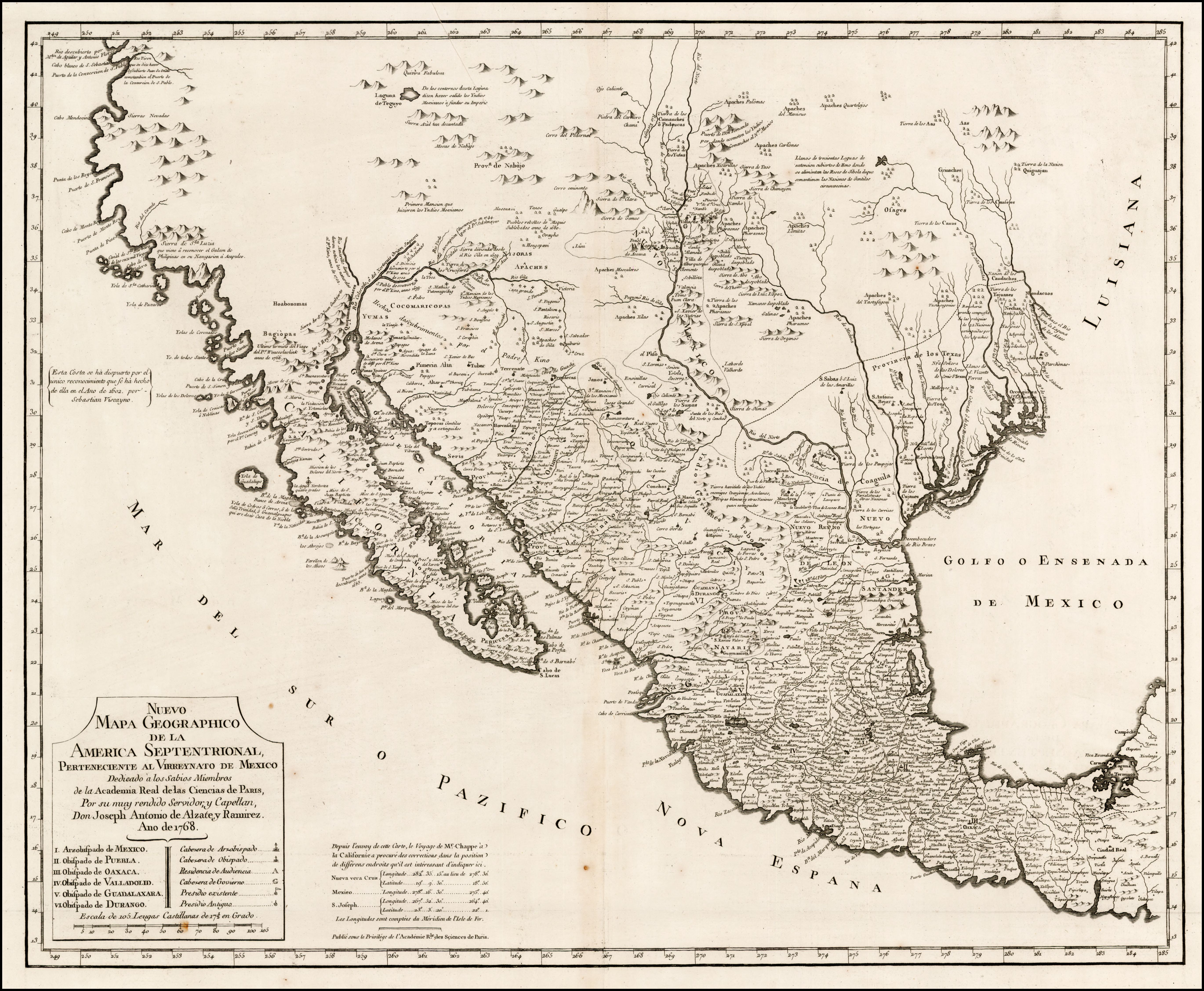

Also a group of Biscayan and Portuguese headed by Martín de Gamón was incorporated, same that by rebel and troublemaker in 1563 he was ordered to give a club in the San Juan Valley. With the death of the leader the group dispersed. Some of those now led by Martín López de Ibarra as governor were: Alberto del Canto, Diego de Montemayor, Gaspar Castaño de Sosa and other future collaborators of Luis de Carvajal y de la Cueva.

Among these explorers they discovered the Extremadura valley at the end of 1572, but due to the difficulties they decided to populate it later since "that valley was so beautiful that it made you want to live in it."

Del Canto knew many lands: Chiametla, Copala, Sinaloa, Topiao Guatimapé, he walked through San Martín and Sombrerete, Chalchihuites and Sain, Nieves and Río Grande, through Nombre de Dios and Victoria, through Fresnillo and Zacatecas, through Cedros and Mazapil. There he made friends with Diego de Montemayor and Gaspar Castaño de Sosa and Luis Carvajal y de la Cueva, all Portuguese like himself. It is also probable that in 1569 he accompanied Martín López de Ibarra on his expedition to the north.

=== Foundations ===
There is no doubt that in 1577, the date of the foundations of Alberto del Canto, a wide region of the northeast had already been explored, almost the entire “Great Cuachichila” that reached as far as the center of Nuevo León and Coahuila, and that reached north.

==== Cerralvo ====
In 1577 Del Canto also discovered and settled in what he called the San Gregorio Magno mines in present-day Cerralvo. Probably on March 12, 1577, where Alberto del Canto was appointed mayor of the mines of San Gregorio and Extremadura Valley by commission of Mr. Martín López de Ibarra, governor of Nueva Vizcaya.

Carvajal would re-found it as the city of León on April 12, 1582. In any case, once his royals had settled, Alberto del Canto, in the company of 25 soldiers, left for Saltillo.

==== Monclova ====
On May 29, 1577 Alberto del Canto carried out the foundation of "Minas de la Trinidad" as a town in Nueva Vizcaya, given the importance of the Silver vein. He was also named as mayor. Which empowered Diego de Montemayor to populate and pacify the area.

The Parral document does not define a date, but it is most likely that the foundations coincide with the dates of the saints. The feast of the Holy Trinity was the following Sunday after Pentecost, fifty days after Easter. According to the current calendar, this must have been May 29, 1577.

Luis Carvajal, who was obliged by the capitulations to found towns in 1582, established the town again under the name of Nueva Almadén (Monclova), thus named referring to the Almadén mines, in Castile, as part of Nuevo Leon.

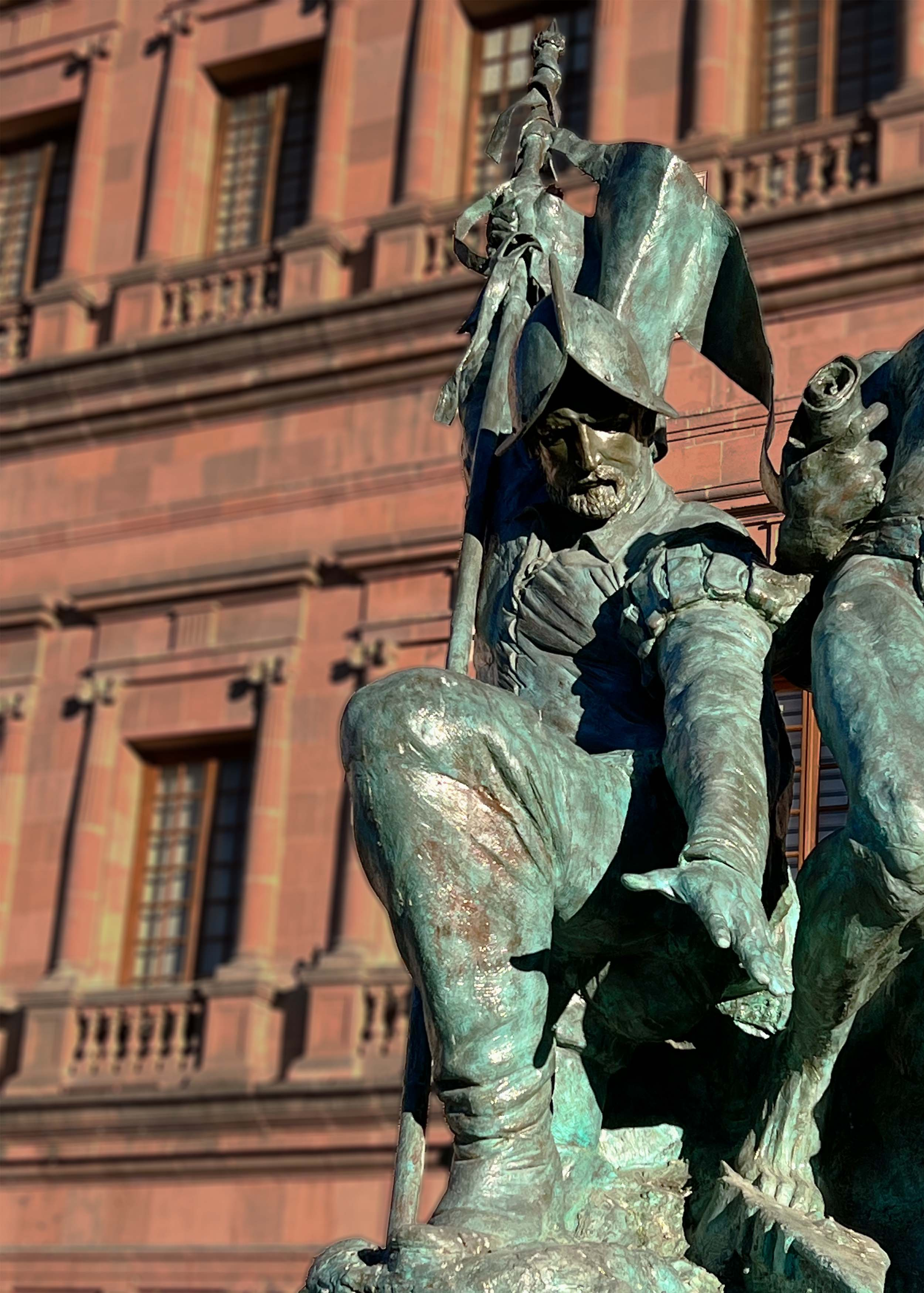
Alberto del Canto's sculpture at Saltillo, Coah.

==== Saltillo ====
The current valley of Saltillo was explored by Francisco Cano at the end of 1568 from Mazapil taking possession on behalf of Nueva Galicia. Martín López de Ibarra, explored the same area and distributed grants in the name of Nueva Vizcaya. But according to the Del Parral Document, it states that Captain Alberto del Canto founded the Villa de Santiago (James the Great) de Saltillo in 1577, and although the document does not specify the date, it is assumed to be July 25, the feast day of James the Great.

At a signal, they dismounted, formed a circle, and dropped to one knee. "In the name of Philip II our king, the Villa de Santiago del Saltillo is founded," they chanted. Del Canto drove his sword and claimed the land and waters for his king.

Also there Alberto del Canto was appointed mayor with the order to pacify the town of Potosí and the Couyla or Coahuila Valley.

==== Monterrey ====
Even though Monterrey was officially founded in 1596, thanks to a jurisdictional litigation called "The Parral Document" we know that Alberto del Canto "settled the Extremadura Valley and called it Ojos de Santa Lucia, which today is called the city of Monterrey." and although the date is not indicated in this document, it is most likely that it was December 13, 1577, the feast of Saint Lucy of Syracuse, as "mayor of the San Gregorio mines and the Extremadura valley."

The name of Cerro de la Silla is also attributed to it, because it seemed to him that it had the profile of an equestrian saddle. In the same way he named Cerro de las Mitras, Cerro del Topo Chico and the Santa Catarina River.

Five years later, in 1582, on the north bank of the Ojo de Agua Grande, Luis Carvajal founded the town of San Luis, in honor of St. Louis IX of France, although in the background it is seen that it was an allusion to himself, as it also did with the founding of the Villa de la Cueva in 1583. Anyway in the capitulations with King Philip II forces Carvajal: "Do you force to inland in parts whatever purpose you will go further pursuing the said populations to reach the governorship of Florida said that part" ... "By our Faith and real word that what is offered to you on our part, we will have it saved and fulfilled ...," adding that if Carvajal does not fulfill his obligations, "we will order that they proceed against you as against a person who does not comply and he keeps the commandments of his natural King and Lord."

Eventually Carvajal enslaves native indians, and after ten years he has not fulfilled what he was obliged to do in the capitulations and his crafty invasion of other kingdoms. So he falls from grace, he is persecuted by the Inquisition and Viceroy Villamanrique. He is arrested in January 1589, until February 26, 1590. While Governor Carvajal remained a prisoner in Mexico City, the New Kingdom of León was depopulating.

And it was not until September 1596 when Diego de Montemayor decided to lead an attempt to repopulate now as the Metropolitan City of Our Lady of Monterrey. Among other reasons to ingratiate himself with the newly appointed viceroy Gaspar de Zúñiga Acevedo y Velasco V count of Monterrey in 1595.

==== Potosí ====
Also in the Parral Document it says that Alberto del Canto, "following the order he was carrying ... (after populating Santa Lucía) pacified the town of Potosí and the Couyla valley." It is not clear which population he is referring to. It could be the town of Potosí, at the foot of Cerro El Potosí in Galeana (Nuevo León). Some say that it refers to Cuatrocíenegas since in 1582 at the entrance of Luis Carvajal he also tried to usurp this foundation of Nueva Vizcaya to comply with the capitulations.

=== Consolidation and pacification ===
He fought for the pacification of the Chichimecas, among whom he took numerous prisoners to work the mines of Santa Lucía (Monterrey) and San Gregorio (Cerralvo), which he owned.

On January 29, 1580, Martín López de Ibarra confirmed the land distributions made by Alberto del Canto in the Saltillo region and appointed Diego de Montemayor “mayor of the mines of San Gregorio and the town of Saltillo and the Extremadura valley, Potosí and its districts”.

Alberto del Canto, at the end of 1582, received without opposition Luis Carvajal in his second stay in America, but now with the authorization of King Phillip II his project to colonize lands north of New Spain. The new territory of the foundation of the Nuevo Reino de León, whose jurisdictional limits started from the port of Pánuco (Veracruz), north of the current Veracruz, which extended 200 leagues to the west and another 200 leagues to the north, thus forming a square that would have 800 kilometers (500 mi) per side; however, this extension would invade the jurisdictions of the Kingdom of Nueva Vizcaya, to which the almost recently founded town of Santiago del Saltillo belonged.

Now in the influence of Carvajal, governor of the new province Alberto del Canto continued his exploration work. In one of those entrances he fought with people from Diego de Montemayor, who had sworn not to cut his beard until he killed Del Canto. Carvajal, knowing that he needed both of them to explore and govern the new Kingdom, decides to make an unconventional pact: the marriage of Alberto del Canto with Estavania Montemayor, daughter of Montemayor and his third and late wife, Juana Porcallo.

=== Persecutions ===
In 1578, Alberto del Canto was ordered to be apprehended by Dr. Jerónimo de Orozco, president of the Royal Audience of Guadalajara, because he had entered Saltillo in the Nueva Galicia district, in principle among the Indians who were at peace, and that he took as a slave and for other serious crimes. He was taken prisoner but escaped to Nueva Vizcaya, where Governor Martín López de Ibarra not only protected him but sent him to Saltillo, with soldiers to protect him.

It is also said that Alberto del Canto, fleeing from the Royal audience, entered among the Chichimecas, entering Nuevo León, from the end of 1579 to the middle of 1581, when the news of the death of Jerónimo Orozco arrived, in Guadalajara, president of the Royal hearing.

Father Baldo Cortés, first chaplain of the town of Saltillo and one of its founders, to defend the original peoples of the stabilization confronts the Spanish soldiers, showing that such action were public offenses to God and would deny them absolution if they continued. Additionally, he confronts Alberto del Canto and denounces him before the Inquisition.

In 1588 he was named a relative of the Mexican Inquisition and, as such, he accompanied Diego de Montemayor, from Saltillo, to go and apprehend Luis Carvajal.

In 1589, Father Baldo Cortés denounced: "This gentleman Canto, before marrying Estefanía, lived in amasiato with his mother-in-law, the wife of Don Diego de Montemayor, which is why he killed her."

On November 15, 1593, the lay Franciscan Fray Pablo de Góngora denounced Del Canto before the Mexican Inquisition for having had a notorious relationship with Diego de Montemayor's wife. It is possible that these complaints have served Diego de Montemayor so that he will not be prosecuted.

Alberto del Canto was imprisoned by the Holy Office for being suspected of Judaizing (a very common position among the Portuguese), but he escaped and lived among the natives until he was found innocent and the charges were dropped.

On the other hand, it was evident that Alberto del Canto represented the interests of Martín López de Ibarra, lieutenant governor of Nueva Vizcaya and Francisco de Ibarra's uncle, an antagonistic group Luis de Carvajal, so it was forbidden to enter the New Kingdom of Leon.

=== Romances ===
Alberto del Canto was distinguished for his adventurous demeanor and his manliness, he is besieged by women. By the sayings of Pablo de Góngora it is said that Del Canto had an affair with Dona Juana Porcallo, Diego de Montemayor's third wife. Upon learning of this in 1581, he kneels her to death with his own sword, vowing not to trim his beard and hair until he killed Del Canto. Although some say that at that time the man had the full right to do so to wash off an injury, the truth is that Diego de Montemayor had to flee to the mines of San Gregorio Cerralvo, and then he had to appoint himself, again, as mayor from Saltillo to Alberto Del Canto.

Diego de Montemayor, who had already gone from the Nueva Vizcaya side to that of Carvajal, and Alberto del Cato fought several times. There are accounts of events in the Pesquería river, León, the San Gregorio mines and the Trinidad mines. As for Don Luis Carvajal, governor of the New Kingdom of León, peace between these two captains suited him, and for Del Canto to change sides, he made them make peace by marrying Estevanía, daughter of Juana Porcallo and Diego de Montemayor at the end of 1587.

=== Marriage and family ===
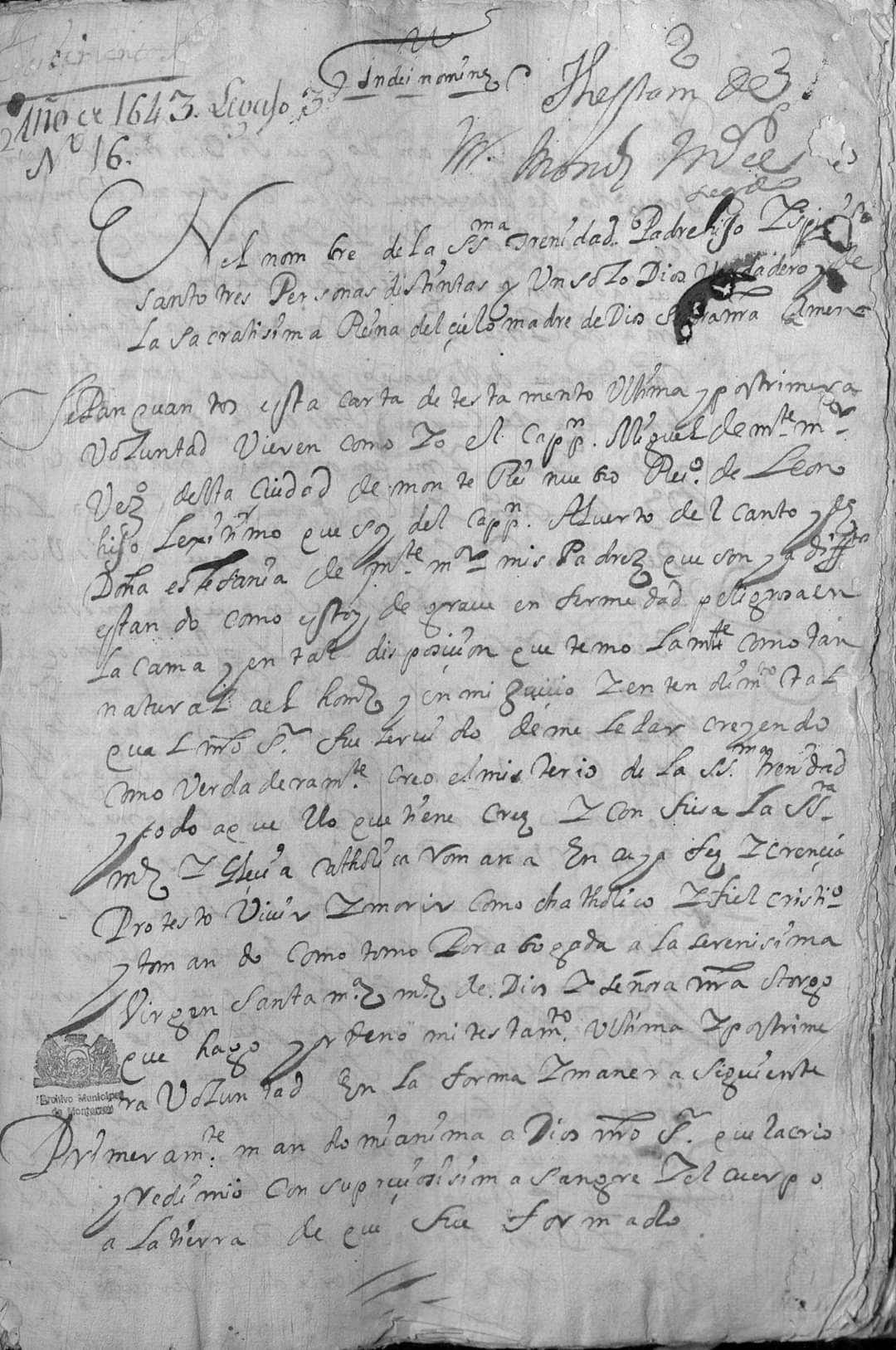

Testament of Miguel de Montemayor

He married Estevanía Procallo de Montemayor procreating his first son named Miguel de Montemayor in 1587, at the end of 1589 his second son was born, baptized with the name of Diego de Montemayor, then in 1593 they had their only daughter, Elvira.

It is said that Estevanía declared that Del Canto had indeed had relations with her mother, accusing her husband and stopped using the Canto surname and her children took the maternal surname.

=== Death ===
He died at his Buena Vista hacienda near Saltillo in 1611 as a city councilor.

== Bibliography ==
- del Hoyo, Eugenio (2005). Historia del Nuevo Reino de León (1577-1723) (in Spanish). Fondo Editorial de Nuevo León. ISBN 9789709715071.
