= History of Nuevo León =

The Estado Libre y Soberano de Nuevo León (Free and Sovereign State of Nuevo León) was first colonized in the 16th century by immigrants from the Iberian Peninsula. The majority of these were conversos, ethnic Jews converted to Roman Catholicism. Later the state received more arrivals of other Europeans, some Asians and those from North America settled down in the 19th century. Cross-migration of local Mexicans to or from Texas creates strong cultural bonds with the neighboring U.S. The province eventually became a state of Mexico. Today it is one of the most industrialized regions of Latin America and the greater city area of its capital, Monterrey has over 5 million residents.

== Origins ==
The earliest known human inhabitants of the region now known as Nuevo León were a small number of Native American nomads. They left no written records, so the recorded history of the region begins with the arrival of European colonists towards the end of the 16th century. The first Europeans to explore what is now Nuevo León, were those of the expedition led by Alvar Nuñez Cabeza de Vaca, they made an expedition through the Spanish Florida (La Florida) to the Pacific sea. After several failed attempts, a group of settlers, among them several families of converted Jews, arrived on the Mexican coast aboard the Santa Catarina. The Jewish imprint in this colony was mild due to acculturation of conversos to Christianity, but, through the passing of tradition, some Jewish customs are still seen today, such as food preparation and holiday observances. Led by the Portuguese Luis Carvajal y de la Cueva they settled in what is now the city of Monterrey in fulfillment of a commitment made by King Philip II of Spain: the establishment of the New Kingdom of León (Nuevo Reino de León). Carvajal and his followers, which consisted of more than sixty soldiers and outlaws, were reputed to have made a fortune capturing and selling Indian slaves.

The first years of the colony were difficult for those who were beleaguered by the Spanish Inquisition, indigenous tribes, and by several floods. The previous settlement founded by Carvajal remained sparsely inhabited and was eventually depopulated. The definitive foundation of Monterrey occurred on September 20, 1596, when Spanish captain Diego de Montemayor, founded the city of Our Lady of Monterrey, "Along with a great mountain and the Santa Lucia water springs", which had been the name of the village previously founded by Carvajal.

== New Kingdom of León ==
From the outset, the greater portion of the population remained concentrated in what was to be formally designated in 1596 as the city of Monterrey. However, arrival of settlers from all over Spain were present in upcoming years. As the case of Bernabé de las Casas, a Spanish-Canarian explorer from Tenerife, Canary Islands, Spain, who after his victorious expedition with Juan de Oñate and fighting against Acoma Indians in New Mexico, came to the region with Spanish and Canarians families to found several settlements and mining camps in a then unsettled region of the New Kingdom of León, later known as Valle de las Salinas (Salinas Valley), in the subsequent years many villages were founded by his descendants, and the Salinas Valley was declared an 'alcaldía mayor'.

The establishment of Spanish settlements in Northern Nuevo León, was often slowed down by attacks of Native Americans, of Coahuiltecan origin such as Alazapas, Cuanales, and Gualeguas, among others. The attacks were prompted by, or in response to, Spanish slave raids on the Indians. Spanish Captain Alonso de León wrote a description of many assaults and atrocities against the Spaniards in the New Kingdom of León, he also stated that the indigenous population of the New Kingdom of León, was different in all aspects from that of other provinces of New Spain.

Mestizaje, a characteristic of many provinces in New Spain, was difficult on this province, the natives resisted to accept Christianity imposed by Spaniards, and they did not want to be incorporated into Spanish / Criollo society. This feeling of racial segregation was reciprocated among many Spanish and Spanish-born Reineros of the New Kingdom of León towards the indigenous people, who were frequently at war with them, the indigenous population had no permanent establishment.

Instead, several nomadic tribes whose main activity was war and hunting, those skirmish were a major problem among the Spanish population. By the end of the Spanish rule, the white population of the New Kingdom of León comprised approximately 80% of the population. By the end of the colonial era, the reineros (as they were known) had obtained a certain stability and had established the city of Linares, considered the second largest city, located southeast of Monterrey.

== Insurgent era ==
News about the insurgent movement started by Miguel Hidalgo on 16 September 1810, was virtually nonexistent to the inhabitants of the New Kingdom of León, until a letter sent by Felix María Calleja to then New Leon governor Manuel de Santa María on 29 September. The distance and poor condition of access routes were a factor for the delayed post service, from the capital of New Spain to the relatively remote northern provinces. The impulse toward insurgency against Spain was rapidly suffocated in the region. The New Kingdom of León, along with Provincias Internas de Oriente, was in its first years one of the regions with relatively less support for the insurgent cause. As for the New Kingdom of León, among several explanations for this fact was that it was one of the last territories colonized by the Spanish Empire in New Spain. Also, it was the province which reported the highest proportion of people of Spanish and Criollo ancestry, as reported in the revillagigedo 1790 census, followed by Texas and Coahuila.

The ideology or ideals which Miguel Hidalgo fought were at his first attempt not well received in the Provincias Internas de Oriente, because of stronger ties with Spain and loyalism to Fernando VI, and counter-insurgency movements were present on the region, mainly in the first years of the war, with the movement of a former insurgent general Ignacio Elizondo, who changed to the army of loyalists of Fernando VI, the reasons are controversially disputed, but its understood that he was a loyalist when he joined the insurgent side, and its convictions were stronger when he was influenced and persuaded by general Ramón Díaz de Bustamante to organize a plot to caught major insurgency precursors such as Miguel Hidalgo, Ignacio Allende, and Mariano Abasolo, whom Ignacio Elizondo, caught at Bajan, Coahuila, in 1811, while they were fleeing northward toward Monclova, ultimately hoping to reach sanctuary in the United States.

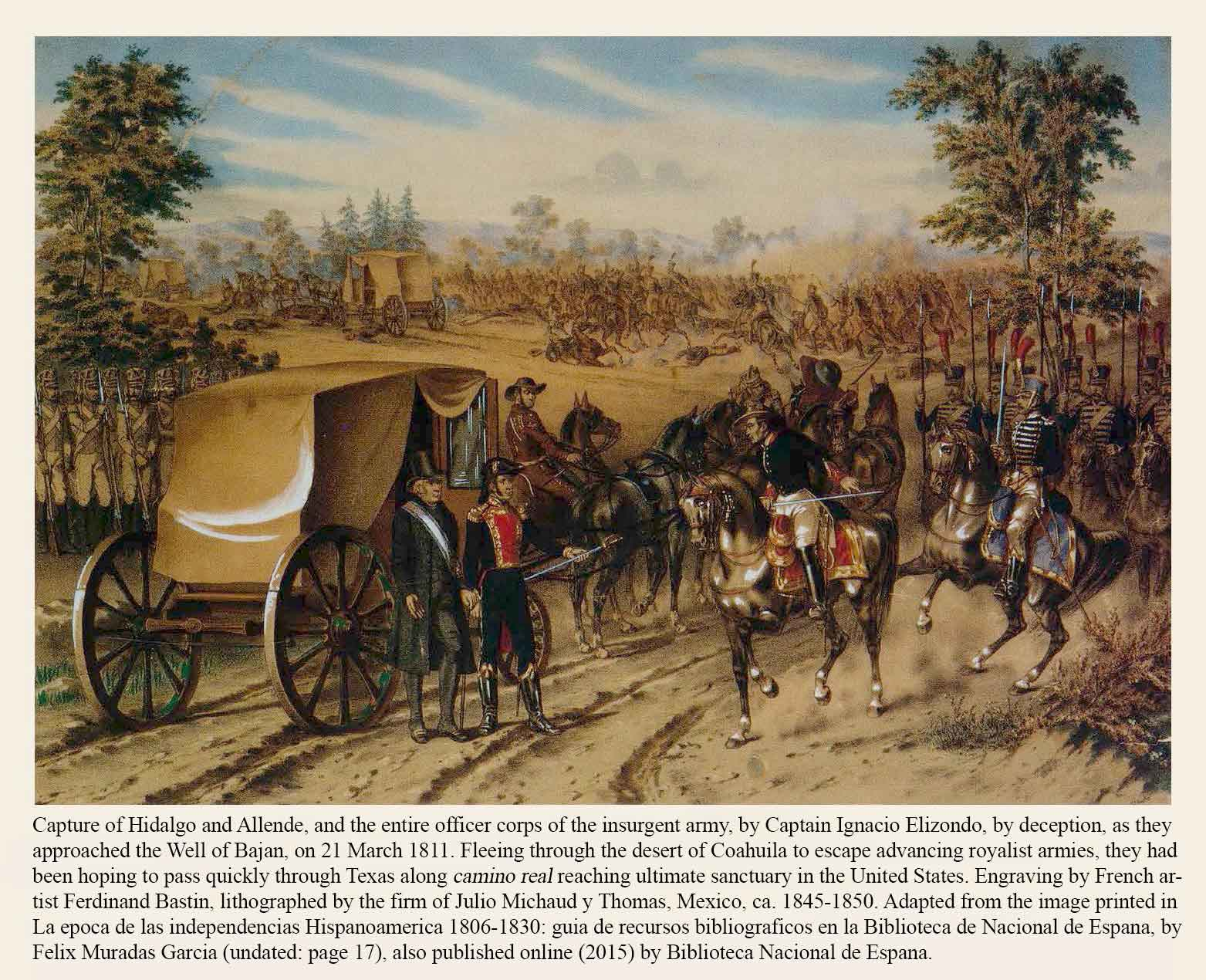
Captain (later Lt. Col.) Elizondo captures insurgents at Bajan, Coahuila on 21 March 1811.

In the later years of the war, movement toward insurgency were less frequent and the independence sentiment was reasserted but there was some discomfort about the situation because of a general displeasure with the news that José María Morelos, one of the leaders of the movement, had convoked a constituent congress in Chilpancingo, in the south of Mexico, and had named himself representative of the Nuevo Reino de León, although he had absolutely no prior connection to the region. Just one year before Juan José de la Garza had represented the Nuevo Reino de León in the Cortes Generales at Cádiz, which had produced the liberal Spanish Constitution of 1812.

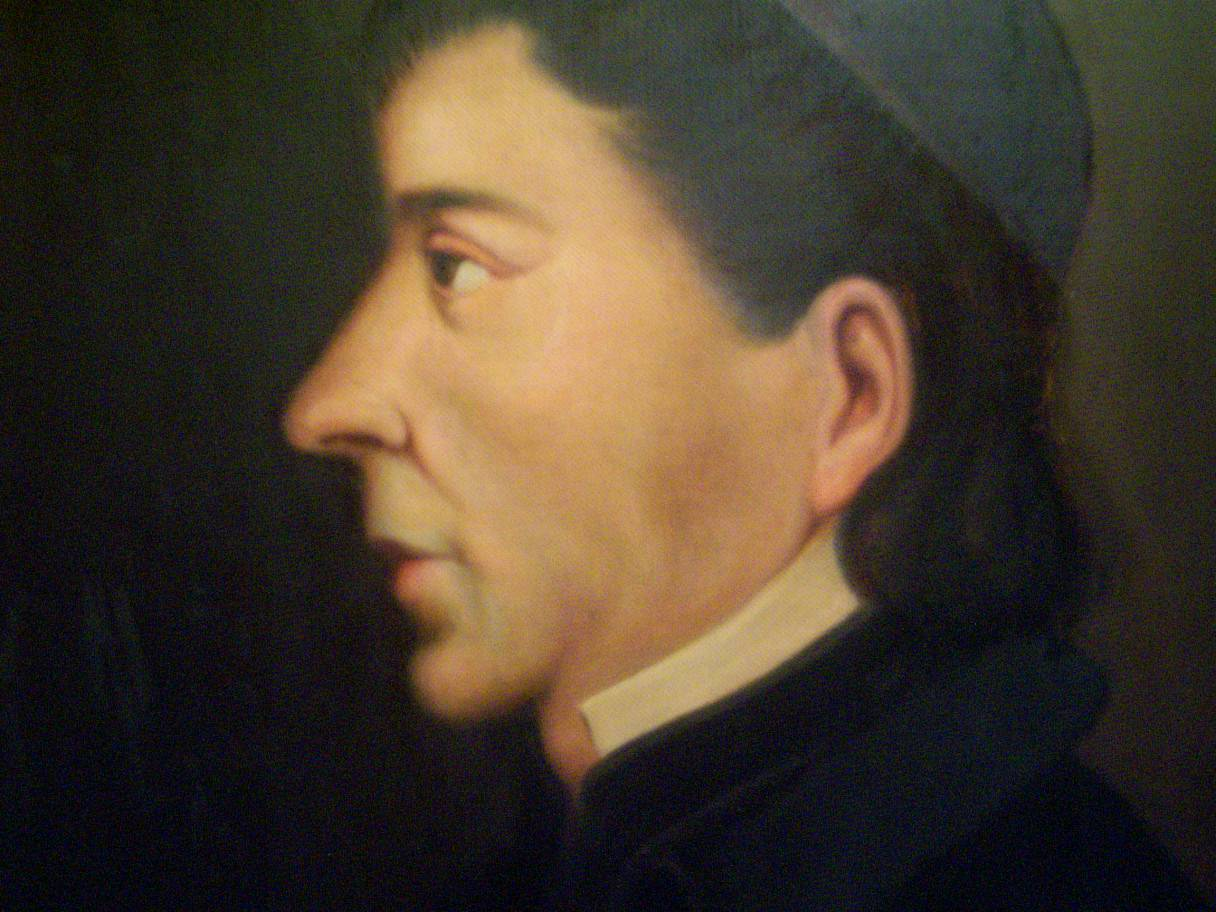
Portrait of Friar Servando Teresa de Mier in 1820.

After Mexican independence was achieved, Fray Servando Teresa de Mier (a rather unorthodox priest who claimed that the Virgin of Guadalupe had been engraved not on the tilma of Juan Diego but on the mantle of Saint Thomas) represented Nuevo Reino de León at the national constituent congress. In its decree number 45, article 1, the congress pronounced that "Nuevo León will be from this time forward a state of the Mexican Federation".

Father Mier organized the establishment of a local legislature, which adopted the first constitution of the newly established state 5 March 1825. This state congress was dissolved in 1835 and the state was converted into a "Department". The national struggle between conservatives and liberals damaged the region's stability. In 1846, during the Mexican–American War, United States forces besieged Monterrey (see Battle of Monterrey). Additionally, native tribes originating in the U.S. made a brutal assault on the region, stealing women, children, cattle, and provisions. The chaos was such that it became routine to draw up ones will before making even a short journey.

== Separatist attempts ==
The flag of the Republic of the Rio Grande. The insurgency lasted from 17 January to 6 November 1840.

By the middle of the 19th century, the inhabitants of Nuevo León began to take reprisals against the indigenous natives, the U.S., and the Mexican authorities. In 1850 towns throughout Nuevo León were ready with an armed militia and with combat provisions (bastimento) already prepared for a combat that could break out at any moment. The bastimento consisted of corn biscuits, dried meat, and chocolate, the cornerstones of the rural diet of Nuevo León then and now.

The response to the native invasions was ruthless. Influenced by the methods of the Americans to their north, the Nuevoleonese poisoned the waters from which the natives drank and put a bounty on natives' scalps. The combat with the Apaches, Comanches, runaway Kickapoos and North American filibusterers, while brutal and inhuman, gave a great deal of experience to the Nuevoleonese militias, who defeated the Mexican Army in several battles. The combat skills of local heroes Juan Zuazua, José Silvestre Aramberri, Mariano Escobedo, Lázaro Garza Ayala and Jerónimo Treviño were all tempered by those skirmishes.

The leader of this self-defense movement was Santiago Vidaurri, who proclaimed the Plan de Monterrey in 1855, restoring the sovereignty of Nuevo León. Later a sympathizer with the Confederacy in the American Civil War, Vidaurri democratically annexed the Mexican state of Coahuila by plebiscite and later declared the República de la Sierra Madre, one of Nuevo León's two famous attempts at separatism (the other being the Republic of the Rio Grande in 1840). Upon the death of his chief military supporter, general Juan Zuazua, he was easily taken prisoner by other Nuevoleonese loyal to Benito Juárez, who decreed the deannexation of Coahuila.

== Later history ==
At the end of the 19th century, several industries grew up in Nuevo León that, over the course of time, would come to dominate the Mexican economy. This was the period in which the first Nuevoleonese banks arose, as well as breweries, cementer manufacturers, steel mills. Toward the middle of the 20th century, Nuevo León had two internationally famous educational institutions: the Autonomous University of Nuevo León and the Technological Institute of Higher Studies in Monterrey (Instituto Tecnológico y de Estudios Superiores de Monterrey). The state received a heavy flow of German, Russian and Italian immigration, thus enriched the local Mexican culture and closened ties with Texas of the United States.

In the 1970s some terrorist groups espousing communist ideology and identified with the social problems of southeastern Mexico plagued Nuevo León with assassinations of important businessmen, among them Eugenio Garza Sada. Economic crises struck the state like everywhere in Mexico, but again came remarkable economic growth in the 1990s brought on by North American Free Trade Agreement or NAFTA has improved living conditions.

As of 2004, Nuevo León leads Mexico in most indexes of health and quality of life. Municipalities such as San Pedro Garza García have the highest standard of living in the country and all North America, and Nuevo León as a whole has a human development index superior to some European countries; compared against countries, it would occupy position #32 in the world.

== Important dates in the history of Nuevo León ==
Date	Event
1577	Alberto del Canto founds the village of Santa Lucía, (now Monterrey).
31 May 1579	Philip II of Spain orders the establishment of a new kingdom in the Americas.
1581	Luis Carvajal y de la Cueva founds the Nuevo Reino de León (New Kingdom of León).
15 December 1777	Pope Pius VI creates the episcopate of Nuevo León in the bull Relata semper.
29 October 1810	News of the Grito de Dolores arrive to Monterrey
7 May 1824	Nuevo León is designated a Mexican state.
5 March 1825	First constitution of the state of Nuevo León approved.
17 January 1840	Republic of the Rio Grande: Nuevo León declares itself independent of México along with Coahuila and Tamaulipas.
6 November 1840	The Mexican army defeats the separatists.
20 September 1846	The United States Army begins the siege of Monterrey.
February 1848	The United States Army leaves the territory.
19 February 1856	Republic of the Sierra Madre: Nuevo León annexes Coahuila and again announces secession from Mexico.
5 February 1857	1857 Constitution: Nuevo León ceases to exist and becomes part of Coahuila.
26 February 1864	Nuevo León regains status as free state and integral part of the federation.
3 April 1864	Monterrey is declared capital of Nuevo León. Separatists defeated.
June 1991	With the Solidarity International Bridge, Nuevo León opens a border checkpoint with Texas at the planned community of Colombia.

== See also ==
- Timeline of Monterrey, Nuevo León

== Sources ==
- Cavazos, Israel (2003), Breve historia de Nuevo León, Fondo de Cultura Económica, ISBN 968-16-4541-3
- De León, Alonso (2005), Historia de Nuevo León con noticias sobre Coahuila, Tamaulipas, Texas y Nuevo México, Fondo de Cultura Económica, ISBN 970-9715-09-7
- Vizcaya, Isidro (2005), En los albores de la independencia: las Provincias Internas de Oriente durante la insurrección de don Miguel Hidalgo y Costilla, 1810-1811, Fondo de Cultura Económica, ISBN 970-9715-04-6
