= List of municipal presidents of Monterrey =

Municipal President of Monterrey
- Mayor of Monterrey
- Seal of the municipality of Monterrey.

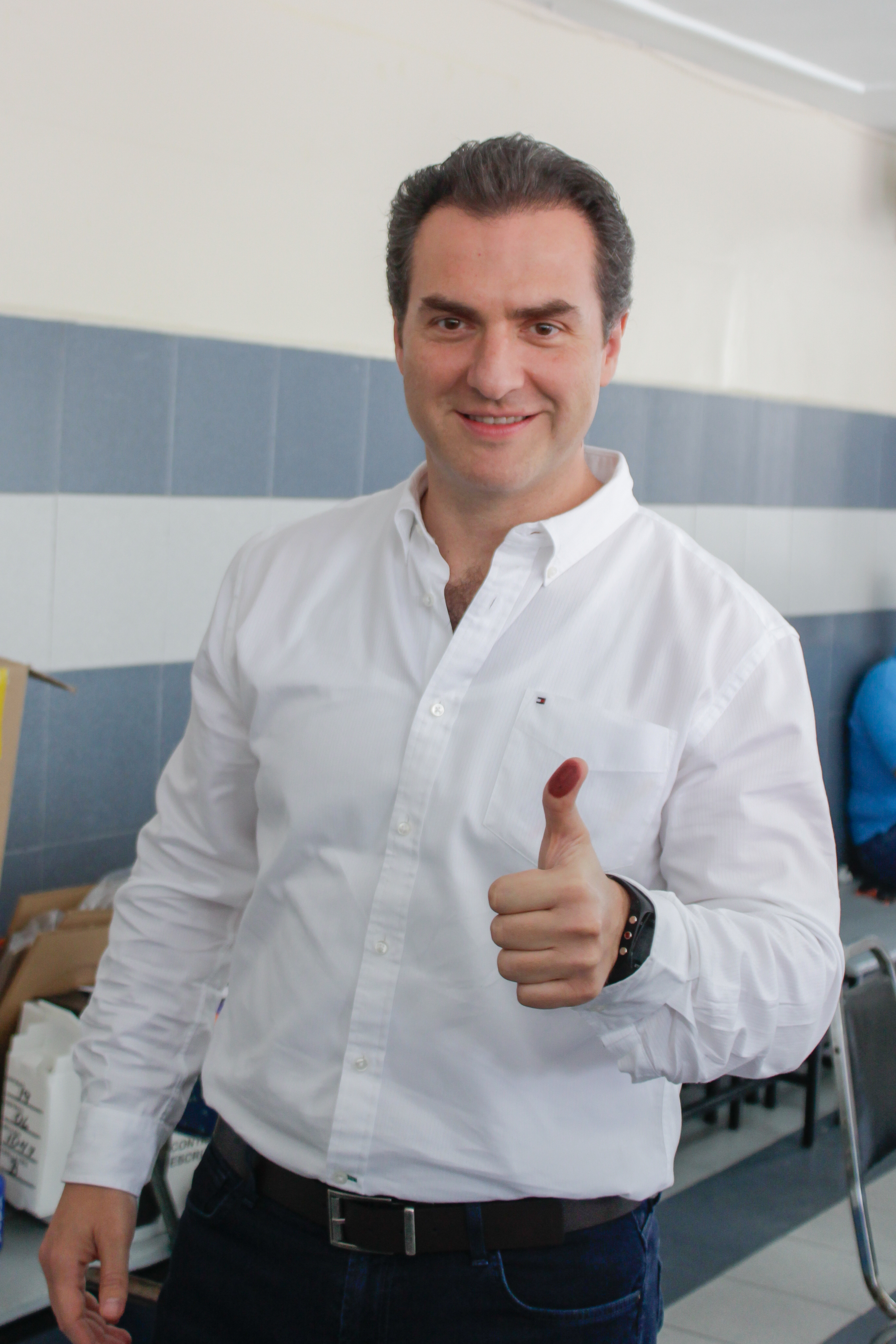
- Incumbent; Adrián de la Garza since 1 October 2024
- Term length: Three years, renewable once
- Formation: 1596
- First holder: Diego de Montemayor
- Website: Government of the City of Monterrey

List of the colonial governors and municipal presidents of the Municipality of Monterrey, in the state of Nuevo León. Monterrey Municipality includes the city of Monterrey.

| Name | From | Until | Sources |
|---|---|---|---|
| Diego de Montemayor | 1596 | | |
| Juan Pérez de los Ríos | 1599 | | |
| Diego Rodríguez | 1600 | | |
| Antonio Vázquez del Río | 1601 | | |
| Juan Pérez de los Ríos | 1602 | | |
| Lucas García | 1603 | | |
| Juan de Farías | 1604 | 1605 | |
| Diego de Montemayor | 1606 | | |
| Lucas García | 1607 | | |
| Alfonso López de Baena | 1610 | | |
| Juan de Farías | 1611 | | |
| Diego Rodríguez | 1612 | | |
| Diego de Huelva | 1613 | | |
| José de Treviño | 1614 | | |
| Rodrigo Flores | 1615 | | |
| Diego Rodríguez | 1616 | | |
| Miguel de Montemayor | 1619 | | |
| Diego Rodríguez | 1621 | | |
| Diego Rodríguez | 1623 | | |
| Marcos González | 1624 | | |
| Miguel de Montemayor | 1625 | | |
| Bernabé de la Casas | 1626 | | |
| Lucas García | 1627 | 1628 | |
| Alonso de Treviño | 1629 | | |
| Gonzalo Fernández de Castro | 1630 | | |
| Martín de Zavala | 1631 | | |
| Alonso de Treviño | 1632 | | |
| Rodrigo Ruiz | 1633 | 1634 | |
| Gonzalo Fernández de Castro | 1635 | | |
| Alonso de Treviño | 1636 | | |
| José de Treviño | 1637 | | |
| Juan de Tarranco Vallejo | 1638 | | |
| Gonzalo Fernández de Castro | 1641 | | |
| Blas de la Garza Falcón | 1642 | | |
| Nicolás de la Serna y Alarcón | 1643 | | |
| Pedro Romero | 1644 | | |
| Nicolás de la Serna y Alarcón | 1645 | | |
| Alejo de Treviño | 1646 | | |
| Juan Cavazos | 1647 | | |
| Bartolomé González | 1648 | | |
| Blas de la Garza | 1649 | | |
| Lázaro de la Garza | 1650 | | |
| Juan de Abrego | 1653 | | |
| José de la Garza | 1654 | | |
| Juan de Abrego | 1655 | | |
| Jusepe de Treviño | 1656 | | |
| Juan de Abrego | 1657 | | |
| Juan de la Garza Falcón | 1658 | | |
| Pedro de la Garza | 1659 | | |
| Nicolás Ocho de Elejalde | 1660 | | |
| Alejo de Treviño | 1661 | | |
| Nicolás de la Serna y Alarcón | 1662 | | |
| Blas de la Garza Falcón | 1663 | | |
| Diego de Ayala | 1664 | | |
| José de Treviño | 1665 | | |
| Juan Cavazos | 1666 | | |
| Juan de la Garza Falcón | 1668 | | |
| Juan Cavazos | 1669 | | |
| Pedro Flores | 1670 | | |
| Nicolas Ochoa de Elejalde | 1671 | | |
| Blas de la Garza | 1672 | 1674 | |
| Nicolás Ochoa de Elejalde | 1675 | | |
| Juan Cavazos | 1676 | | |
| Lucas Caballero | 1677 | | |
| José de Ayala | 1678 | | |
| Diego de Ayala | 1679 | | |
| Andres González | 1681 | | |
| Francisco de la Garza | 1682 | | |
| Pedro de la Garza | 1683 | | |
| Andrés Gonález | 1684 | 1685 | |
| Nicolás Ocho de Elejalde | 1687 | | |
| Tomas de la Serna | 1688 | | |
| Andrés González | 1690 | | |
| Juan de Treviño | 1691 | | |
| Andrés González | 1692 | | |
| Miguel de la Garza Falcón | 1693 | | |
| Francisco Báez Treviño | 1694 | | |
| Francisco de la Garza Falcón | 1695 | | |
| Antonio Fernández Vallejo | 1697 | | |
| Francisco Báez | 1698 | | |
| José Ochoa de Elejalde | 1699 | | |
| Francisco de la Garza Falcón | 1700 | | |
| Gabriel de la Garza | 1701 | | |
| José Ochoa de Elejalde | 1702 | | |
| Pedro Guajardo | 1703 | | |
| Antonio López de Villegas | 1704 | | |
| Juan Esteban de Ballesteros | 1705 | | |
| Antonio Fernández Vallejo | 1707 | | |
| Matias de Aguirre | 1708 | | |
| Pedro Guajardo | 1709 | | |
| Antonio Fernández Vallejo | 1710 | | |
| Alonso Riodríguez | 1711 | | |
| Nicolás de Vandale Massien | 1712 | | |
| Francisco Báez Treviño | 1713 | | |
| Pedro Guajardo | 1714 | | |
| Antonio López de Villegas | 1715 | | |
| Fco. A. Dávila; Joaquín Escamilla | 1716, March (Dávila) | | |
| Antonio López de Villegas | 1717 | | |
| Nicolás de Vandele Massien | 1718 | | |
| Pedro Guajardo | 1719 | | |
| Antonio García de Sosa y Guerra | 1720 | | |
| Pedro de la Barreda y Ebra | 1722 | | |
| Joaquín de Escamilla | 1723 | | |
| Alonso García Cuello | 1724 | | |
| Miguel Cantú | 1728 | | |
| José Alejandro Uro y Campa | 1729 | | |
| Pedro García Guerra | 1730 | | |
| José García Guerra | 1731 | | |
| Francisco Javier Flores | 1732 | | |
| Domingo Miguel Guajardo | 1733 | | |
| Francisco Báez Treviño (Hijo) | 1734 | | |
| Pedro de la Barrera y Ebra | 1737 | | |
| José Adriano de la Garza | 1739 | | |
| Francisco Ignacio de Larralde | 1740 | | |
| Francisco Sánchez de Robles | 1741 | | |
| Francisco Ignacio de Lararlde | 1743 | | |
| José Alejandro de Uro y Campa | 1744 | | |
| José Lorenzo de Hoyos y Solar | 1745 | | |
| Juaquín Martínez Guajardo | 1746 | | |
| Juaquín Fernández Vallejo | 1747 | | |
| Antonio Marcos de Cossio | 1748 | | |
| Juan Ignacio de Berridi | 1749 | | |
| Miguel Fernandez Riancho y Villegas | 1750 | | |
| Juaquín Martíez Guajardo | 1751 | | |
| Pedro de Alcantara Guerra | 1752 | | |
| Antonio de la Garza Falcón | 1753 | | |
| José Lorenzo de Hoyos y Solar | 1754 | | |
| José Joaquín de Mier y Noriega | 1755 | | |
| José Lorenzo de Hoyos y Solar | 1756 | | |
| Antonio Marcos de Cossio | 1757 | | |
| José Salvador Lozano | | | |
| José Antonio Uresti | | | |
| Francisco Antonio de Rivera y Castro | | | |
| Juan Ignacio de Berridi | | | |
| Pedro de Arguinarena | | | |
| José Joaquín de Mier y Noriega | | | |
| Antonio Marco de Cossio | | | |
| Francisco Antonio de Uro y Campa | | | |
| Juan Lorenzo Baez | | | |
| José Elias de la Garza y Falcón | | | |
| Luis Antonio García de Pruneda | | | |
| José Miguel Cantú del Río y la Cerda | | | |
| Andrés de Golcochea | | | |
| Joaquín Fernández Vallejo | | | |
| José Joaquín de Mier y Noriega | | | |
| José Miguel Cantú del Río y la Cerda | | | |
| Ignacio de Jesús García | | | |
| José Gregorio Fernández Tijerina | | | |
| José Miguel Lozano José Joaquín Canales | | | |
| José Ignacio Treviño Andrés Ayazagoitia | | | |
| José Alejandro de Uro; Campa Ignacio de Jesús García | | | |
| Juan Cristobal de la Garza y Guerra | 1786 | | |
| Manuel de Sada | 1787 | 1788 | |
| Bernardo Ussel y Guimbarda | 1789 | | |
| Roque Tato y López | 1790 | | |
| Pedro José de Elizondo | 1791 | | |
| Manuel de Sada | 1792 | | |
| Bernardo Ussel y Guimbarda | 1793 | | |
| José Antonio García Dávila | 1794 | | |
| Francisco Javier de Uresti | 1795 | | |
| Roque Tato y López | 1796 | | |
| José Francisco de Arizpe | 1797 | | |
| José Joaquín Canales | 1798 | | |
| Manuel de Sada | 1799 | 1800 | |
| Francisco Javier de Uresti | 1801 | 1802 | |
| José Joaquín Canales | 1803 | | |
| Manuel de Sada | 1804 | | |
| Francisco Bruno Barrera | 1805 | 1806 | |
| Alfonso de Barreda | 1807 | | |
| Fernando de Uribe | 1808 | | |
| Pedro de Elizondo | 1809 | | |
| José Antonio de la Garza y Guerra | 1810 | | |
| Bernardo Ussel y Guimbarda | 1811 | | |
| José Valera | 1812 | | |
| Pedro Manuel de Llano | 1813 | | |
| Juan Antonio Mujica | 1814 | | |
| José Froilán de Mier | 1815 | | |
| José Francisco Bruno Barrera | 1816 | 1819 | |
| José Alejandro de Treviño y Gutiérrez | 1820 | | |
| Matías de Llano | 1821 | | |
| José Alejandro de Treviño y Gutiérrez | 1822 | | |
| José Francisco Bruno Barrera | 1823 | 1824 | |
| Julián de Llano | | April 18, 1825 | |
| Julián de Arrese | 1825 | | |
| Manuel María De Llano | | October 1826 | |
| Francisco Tomas de Iglesias | 1826 | | |
| Diego Cenovio de Lachica | | January 13, 1827 | |
| Irineo Castillón | 1827 | | |
| Rafael de la Garza | 1828 | | |
| Pedro González | | January 20, 1829 | |
| Manuel de Uribe | 1829 | | |
| Francisco Tomás de Iglesias | | July 11, 1830 | |
| Nicolás J. De la Garza y Guerra | 1830 | | |
| Irineo Castillon | 1831 | | |
| Manuel María De Llano | 1832 | | |
| Francisco Tomás de Iglesias | 1833 | | |
| Germán de Iglesias | 1834 | | |
| Luis Zambrano | | March 1835 | |
| Santiago García | 1835 | | |
| Leandro Aguilar | | March 1836 | |
| José Justo Cárdenas | 1836 | | |
| Germán de Iglesias | 1837 | | |
| Juan de la Garza Ayala | 1838 | | |
| Germán de Iglesias | | March 1839 | |
| Manuel de la Garza | | May 1839 | |
| Desiderio Taméz | 1839 | | |
| Rafael de la Garza | 1840 | | |
| Manuel María De Llano | 1841 | | |
| Desiderio Taméz | 1842 | | |
| Antonio de Ayala | 1843 | | |
| Manuel Antonio Morales | 1844 | | |
| Pelagio Garivay | 1845 | | |
| José María De la Garza García | | September 1846 | |
| Julio Gutiérrez; Pablo José Carreño | 1846 | | |
| Jesús Dávila y Prieto | 1847 | | |
| Juan José de Garza y Treviño | 1848 | | |
| José María De la Garza y Garza | | | |
| Juan José de la Garza y Treviño | 1849 | | |
| Manuel María De Llano | 1850 | | |
| Gregorio Zambrano | 1851 | | |
| Felipe Sepúlveda | 1852 | | |
| Juan de la Garza Martínez | 1853 | | |
| Esteban Taméz | | February 13, 1854 | |
| Juan de la Garza Martínez | | October 13, 1854 | |
| Felipe Sepúlveda | | December 11, 1854 | |
| José María García Calderón | 1854 | | |
| José María García | 1855 | | |
| Manuel María De Llano | 1856 | | |
| Juan de la Garza Treviño | | | |
| Victoriano Zarza | | March 15, 1857 | |
| Ignacio Galindo | | June 14, 1857 | |
| Pablo José Carreño | 1857 | | |
| Eduardo Casimiro García Dávila | | April 26, 1858 | |
| Ignacio Treviño | 1858 | | |
| Eduardo Casimiro García Dávila | | February 14, 1859 | |
| José María Morelos | 1859 | | |
| Gregorio Zambrano | | March 18, 1860 | |
| José María Martínez | | April 8, 1860 | |
| José María Morelos | 1860 | | |
| Jose María Morelos | 1861 | | |
| José María Viteri | 1862 | | |
| José María Viteri; Martín Pérez | 1863 | May 13 (Viteri) | |
| Pedro Elizondo | | April 18, 1864 | |
| Gregorio Zambrano | | June 13, 1864 | |
| Jesús González Treviño; Jesús María Aguilar | August 28, 1864 | | |
| José María Martínez | 1865 | | |
| Amado Valdés & Teófilo Dávalos | 1866 | May 1, 1869 | |
| Jesús Arreola y Ayala | | September 14, 1869 | |
| Gregorio Morales | 1869 | | |
| Anastasio A. Treviño | 1870 | | |
| Tomás Hinojosa | 1871 | | |
| Gregorio Zambrano | | March 5, 1872 | |
| Tomas Hinojosa | | May 16, 1872 | |
| Rómulo Flores; Ignacio de la Garza García | 1873 | | |
| Francisco Martínez Cárdenas | 1874 | | |
| Jesús González Treviño | | May 1875 | |
| Anastasio A. Treviño | | May 25, 1875 | |
| Modesto Villareal; José Angel Garza Treviño | September 26, 1875 | | |
| José Angel Garza Treviño | 1876 | | |
| Domingo Martínez Echarte | | August 1877 | |
| Ipolito Gutiérrez | 1877 | | |
| Práxedis García | 1878 | | |
| Juan Barrera | | March 1879 | |
| Eusebio Rodríguez | | October 1979 | |
| Ambrosio Cantú | 1879 | | |
| Jacinto García | 1880 | | |
| Domingo Tijerina | 1881 | | |
| Práxedis García | 1882 | | |
| Rafael Sepúlveda | 1883 | | |
| Práxedis García | 1884 | | |
| Eutimio Calzado | 1885 | | |
| Félix Elizondo | 1886 | | |
| Félix Elizondo | | September 1887 | |
| Rafael García Fernández | 1887 | | |
| Rafael García Fernández | 1888 | | |
| Gregorio Elizondo García | 1889 | | |
| Margarito Garza | 1890 | | |
| Lorenzo Sepúlveda | 1891 | 1892 | |
| Carlos Berardi | 1893 | 1894 | |
| Pedro C. Martínez | May 27, 1896 | | |
| Carlos Berardi | | May 1896 | |
| Pedro C. Martínez | 1896 | | |
| Adolfo Zambrano | 1897 | | |
| Pedro C. Martinez | 1898 | 1901 | |
| Lorenzo Sepúlveda | | January 1902 | |
| Pedro C. Martinez | 1902 | | |
| Lorenzo Sepúlveda | 1903 | | |
| Pedro C. Martinez | 1904 | 1909 | |
| Idelfonso Zambrano | 1910 | | |
| Fermin Martínez | 1911 | | |
| Alfredo Pérez | 1912 | | |
| Nicéforo Zambrano | | March 19, 1913 | |
| Fermín Martínez | | April 6, 1913 | |
| Gregorio D. Martínez | 1913 | | |
| Ramón Treviño | | April 13, 1914 | |
| Nicéforo Zambrano | 1914 | | |
| José Videgaray | | May 19, 1915 | |
| Eugenio Pérez Maldonado | 1915 | | |
| Francisco Zambrano | | July 24, 1916 | |
| Antonio Garza Elizondo | 1916 | | |
| Geronimo Siller | 1918 | | |
| Juan M. García | | August 4, 1919 | |
| Adolfo Villareal | 1919 | | |
| Domingo Valdés Llano | | September 19, 1920 | |
| Ignacio Sepúlveda | 1920 | | |
| Hilario Martínez | 1921 | 1922 | |
| Leocadio M. González | 1923 | | |
| Gerónimo Siller | 1924 | | |
| Francisco C. Reyes | | May 1925 | |
| Nicandro L. Tamé | | August 1925 | |
| Manuel Chapa González; Fernando C. Villarreal | October 17 | 1925 | |
| Alejandro Garza | | May 9, 1926 | |
| David Alberto Casio; Felizandro C. Villareal; Antonio Moreno; Eleazar Garcia | 1926 | | |
| Jesús María Salinas, Hijo | 1927 | 1928 | |
| Antonio García González | 1929 | 1930 | |
| Generoso Chapa Garza | 1931 | 1932 | |
| Plutarco Elías Calles, Hijo | 1933 | 1934 | |
| Heriberto Montemayor | | August 1935 | |
| Fausto Galvez Pérez | 1935 | 1936 | |
| Leopoldo Treviño Garza | 1937 | 1938 | |
| Manuel Flores | 1939 | 1940 | |
| Eliseo B. Sanchez | 1941 | 1942 | |
| Constancio Villareal | 1942 | 1946 | |
| Félix González Salinas | 1946 | 1949 | |
| Santos Cantú Salinas | 1949 | 1952 | |
| Alfredo Garza Ríos | 1952 | 1955 | |
| José Luis Lozano | 1955 | 1958 | |
| Rafael González Montemayor | 1958 | 1961 | |
| Leopoldo González Sáenz | 1961 | 1964 | |
| Abiel Treviño | 1964 | 1967 | |
| Cesar Lazo Hinojosa | 1967 | 1970 | |
| Gerardo Torres Díaz | 1970 | 1972 | |
| Julio Camelo y Roberto Garza González | 1972 | 1974 | |
| Leopoldo González Sáenz | 1974 | 1977 | |
| Cesar Santos Santos | 1977 | 1980 | |
| Pedro F. Quintanilla Coffin | 1980 | 1983 | |
| Oscar Herrera Hosking | 1983 | 1986 | |
| Luis Marcelino Farias | 1986 | 1989 | |
| Socrates Cuauhtémoc Rizzo García | 1989 | 1991 | |
| Juventino González Benavides (interim) | 1991 | 1991 | |
| Benjamin Clariond Reyes Retana | 1991 | 1994 | |
| Jesús Hinojosa Tijerina | 1994 | 1997 | |
| Jesús Ma. Elizondo González | 1997 | 2000 | |
| Felipe de Jesús Cantú Rodríguez | 2000 | 2003 | |
| Ricardo Canavati Tafich | 2003 | 2006 | |
| Edgar Oláiz Ortiz (substitute) | 2006 | 2006 | |
| Adalberto Arturo Madero Quiroga | 2006 | 2009 | |
| Fernando Larrazábal Bretón | 2009 | 2012 | |
| Margarita Arellanes Cervantes | 2012 | 2015 | |
| Adrián de la Garza | 2015 | 2021 | |
| Luis Donaldo Colosio Riojas | 2021 | 2024 | |
| Adrián de la Garza | 2024 | current | |

== See also ==
- Timeline of Monterrey, Mexico
- Governor of Nuevo León
