= History of Monterrey =

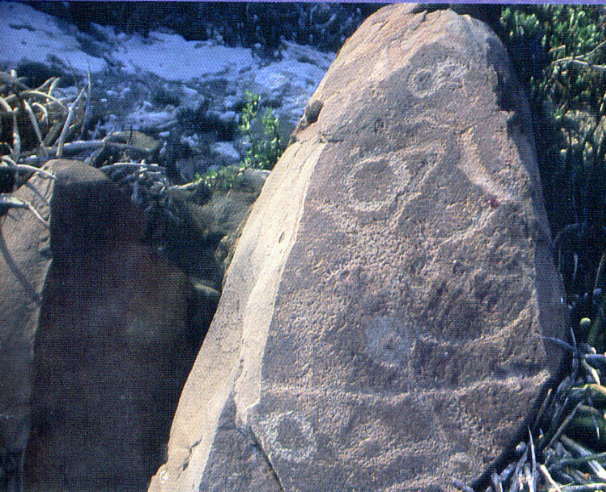
Petroglyph in Boca de Potrerillos Municipality of Mina N.L.

The history of the Mexican city of Monterrey is closely linked with the history of the state of Nuevo León. When the New Kingdom of León was founded, it included Monterrey, Monclova, Saltillo and Cerralvo. The founding families formed a group of about thirty people in each locality. Gradually, Nuevo León was populated with families of nomadic herders of Portuguese origin who fought and displaced the native indigenous groups in the region. The city was a step away from the border with the United States and it began to be a strategic location for industry and trade between the two countries. Originally isolated by the Sierra Madre and far from the center of New Spain and independent Mexico, in the late 19th century and throughout the twentieth century various demographic, social, political, and economic issues began to unfold.

== First settlers ==
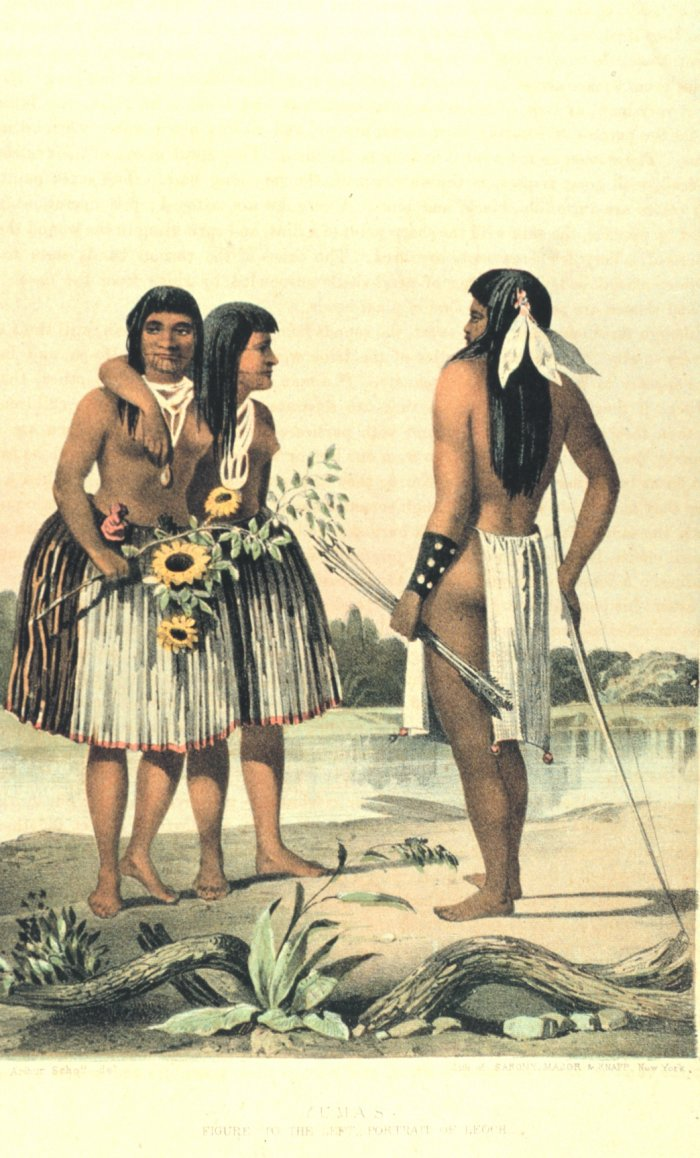
Yumas native of William H. Emory report. Washington 1857

The first settlers were the Chichimecas. Current research has shown a culture of twelve thousand years old.

They were generally called Chichimecas to distinguish them from the larger and more powerful cultural groups of Mesoamerica: the Mayan, Olmec, Zapotec, etc. It is said they were nomadic or semi-nomadic, not wandering aimlessly, but obeying regular movement patterns inside recognized territories; what anthropologists call territorial nomadism. They did not create large urban complexes like other peoples in central Mexico, the splendor of whom sometimes overshadowed them. The Spanish settlers "baptized" them by erasing their original names. Specialists have differentiated several linguistic nuclei between the tribes that inhabited the region but have failed to find a uniform approach, placing them in the family of the Athabascans, the Hokan or Macro-Yuma, subgroup Coahuilteco-Karankawa. Those who inhabited the region of what is now the city were called the Aguaceros ("heavy rains") and the "Malincheños".

They lived in caves and river ravines where they left traces of their passage in paintings, engravings, and movable items which might have been amulets used in fertility rites or initiation of puberty, as well as mortars, hollowed stones and spearheads of all kinds ranging from those dating back millennia like those found in the municipality of Ramones with more than 11,000 thousand years of antiquity, to those used by the tribes of the Comanches in the 19th century. The density of prehistoric domestic waste found in the area confirms that there was a relatively large population, at least seasonally. Radiocarbon tests placed the earliest occupation in Boca de Potrerillos about 8000 years ago.

Between 1960 and 1967, a group of archaeologists from the University of Texas at Austin headed by Jeremiah F. Epstein, undertook an extensive research program in the entire area.

There is also an archaeological museum in the town of Mina and another in Linares created by Pablo Salce.

== Sixteenth century: foundation of the City of Monterrey ==
=== First settlement: Saint Lucia (1577). ===
Born in the Azores in 1547, Captain Alberto del Canto was commissioned by Martin Lopez de Ibarra to make settlements in name of New Vizcaya. Del Canto in 1577 the town of Santiago del Saltillo Minas de la Trinidad (Monclova), Minas de San Gregorio (Cerralvo) and villa de Santa Lucia at the Extremadura Valley and practically just marked a place called Santa Lucia on which today is the center of modern-day Monterrey.

=== Second settlement: "Villa de San Luis Rey de Francia" (1582) ===
In 1567, the Portuguese Luis de Carvajal y de la Cueva, from a family of New Christians, arrived in New Spain aboard a wine ship. As mayor of Tampico (modern state of Tamaulipas next to the Gulf of Mexico), he was entrusted with the "pacification" of the Huasteca and participated in several campaigns of exploration. One of the most important was achieved with Francisco de Puga Valles and Zacatecas, where a route from there to Mazapil (modern state of Zacatecas name after Pugas Valles) and New Galicia (most of the Southwest, near Guadalajara) was discovered in 1573.

The kings of Spain did not finance companies of discovery, but allowed the explorations to be made on behalf of the conquerors. Carvajal traveled to Spain and negotiated a contract with Philip II of Spain in which he was awarded the pacification and population of a vast territory of "200 leagues inland"—about 1,000 km.

In 1580 Carvajal's men, aboard the ship the Santa Catarina, joined the fleet in which the viceroy Lorenzo Suárez de Mendoza, Count de La Coruna, was traveling. Once in Veracruz, the Carvajal group continued on their own to the port of Tampico where they arrived on 25 August.

Carvajal immediately took charge of his commitment. He spent long periods in Tamapache, Temptela, Xalpa and Sichu. On 12 April 1582, he founded the city of Leon—today called Cerralvo—and half a league from there founded another settlement which he called Villa de Cueva. That same year, in the old Saint Lucia, Carvajal founded the Villa de San Luis Rey de Francia. According to one chronicler, in these places there came to be as many as 200 men who undertook the capture of Indians thereby bringing more soldiers to the villages.

To govern these vast territories, in 1585 Carvajal named three lieutenants: Felipe Nuño for the Panuco region, Gaspar Castaño de Sosa for the northeast and Diego de Montemayor for the center, from Santa Lucia to Laguna. At that time, the count of the Coruña began a legal process against Carvajal accusing him of invading territories that were not his. Carvajal asked for and was granted protection by Pedro de Vega, solicitor of the Royal Court, on 18 January 1582. The resentment of the Viceroy turned into a struggle without quarter against Carvajal who could no longer continue his government.

While Carvajal was in Mexico, his nephew, Luis de Carvajal the Younger, took over the duties of governor. But then violent clashes which arose between Indians and conquerors resulted in the depopulation of the town of San Luis. The city of Leon and the town of Cave suffered a similar fate. Finally Diego de Montemayor decided to leave his territory. He and the few neighbors who were gathered in San Francisco (Apodaca) departed for Saltillo.

Meanwhile, around 1588 Luis de Carvajal managed to get released and undertook the task of repopulating the mines of Trinidad, which he called New Almaden -Monclova- and appointed Diego de Montemayor lieutenant governor of Coahuila with jurisdiction over St. Lucia extending to the Parras and from the Rio Grande to Lagua. With this appointment he gave him the task of repopulating the city of Leon as well as las Parras. But Carvajal's problems were not over.

Religion and government during that era were considered the same thing. The charges against Carvajal that he had invaded foreign territory weighed heavily against him. That he belonged to a family of New Christians was held against him and he ended up being excommunicated. He was arrested by Alonso López and taken back to Mexico for trial by the Inquisition. His excommunication was withdrawn after abjuring, but he was sentenced to exile for 6 years, a term he did not complete because shortly afterwards he died in prison.

Gaspar de Sosa, who had been Caraval's lieutenant in Almaden, left the region and went to New Mexico, which earned him banishment to China where he died. The New Kingdom of León was again deserted.

=== Metropolitan city of Our Lady of Monterrey (20 September 1596) ===
It was proving difficult to establish this New Kingdom of León, where so many previous attempts had failed. Diego de Montemayor, who had been appointed lieutenant by Carvajal returned after eight years of absence and established the Metropolitan City of Our Lady of Monterrey where Saint Lucia and the failed Villa of San Luis King of France had been.

Although his abandonment of the settlement, years earlier, could have invalidated the claims of Carvajal on Montemayor and any consequent privileges, this did not happen. Years later, on 11 February 1599, Montemayor was given title to the region by the same Viceroy after the Viceroy had consulted Spain, ruler of the Kingdom.

== Seventeenth century: colonial period ==
=== Early years. Seventeenth century ===
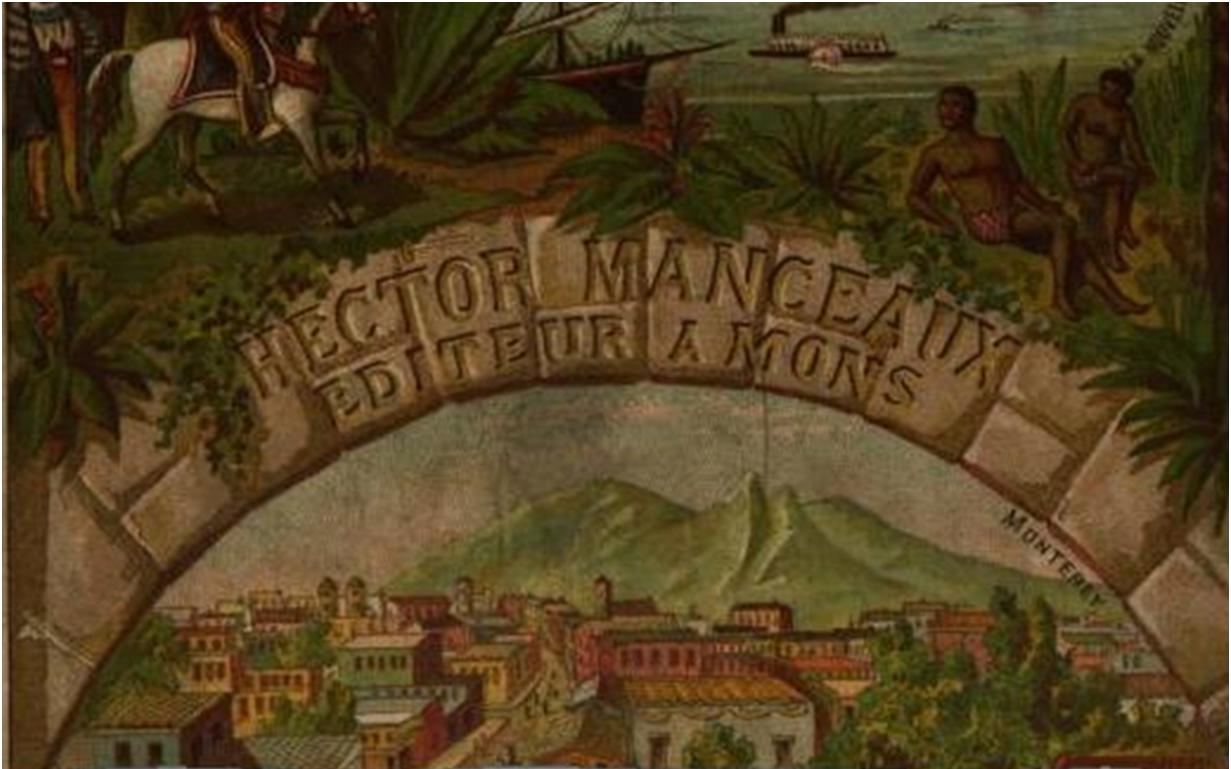
Monterrey. Picture of 1889.

But this Kingdom was only that in name. The first few people-about 34, including children -had to go through many hardships, eating burdock offered them by the springs of water, raising small livestock and farming. Their houses were made of adobe and everything built was gradually destroyed by the rains and floods of 1611. With the death of Montemayor, his son Diego replaced him in office but died the following year. The viceroy then appointed Lieutenant General Agustin de Zavala. He was a rich Zacatecas miner and managed the city through magistrates. Successively these magistrates were Cristobal de Irurrea, Diego Rodriguez and Alonso Lucas el Bueno.

After the floods of 1611, the people again began to build the city, this time in a slightly higher place (Plaza Zaragoza), where general Zavala maintained for more than 10 years a flour store, seeds and other supplies to distribute to the families. He also continued pacification campaigns and established a military detachment under the command of Hernando Huarte de la Concha.

This small kingdom already had a convent by 1602 under the patronage of San Andrés and after the floods of 1611 was moved to its new site in 1626 where it had a cemetery, cell tower and bells. The work of the church here was decisive in the so-called "pacification" of the local native peoples (actually the goal was to enslave them and use them as labor) : the Bozalos in Matehuala, the Gualaguises in San Cristobal (Hualahuises ), the Janambres in San Antonio de los Llanos. In addition, in the early seventeenth century the following missions were established: Santa Maria degli Angeli White River (Aramberri), Santa Teresa del Alamo (1659), San Nicolas de Gualeguas (1672) and others in the north of the kingdom and in southern Texas. the convents of Our Lady of Conception (in Cerralvo 1630) and San Lorenzo (in Cadereyta around 1640) were also established.

=== The Tlaxcalans ===
Another element that helped to pacify and establish the towns in the New Kingdom of León was the alliance of the Spanish with the Tlaxcalans made by Hernán Cortés. Later, throughout the seventeenth and eighteenth centuries, hundreds of Tlaxcala families moved to the northern region of Mexico. They taught the natives (Chichimecas) when they related peacefully, agriculture and handicrafts. Those who passed north were granted the same privileges as Spaniards: receiving land grants, using weapons, putting the Don before their names, riding horses, etc.

In the 18th century, next to Monterrey, the town of Guadalupe was established with the Tlaxcala families who were already in the towns of Purificación and Concepción (in Montemorelos).

=== Feudal lords ===
As in other regions of New Spain, in the New Kingdom of León there was a society differentiated between gentlemen, soldiers, miners, etc. Each of these social groups played their particular role. Among the personalities of rank were, of course, governors and lieutenants, but along with them, the families of the founders, whose power increased if they also had large resources or mercedes-large tracts of land, Indians, cattle, servants, slaves, etc. granted by the Crown. In the seventeenth century, among the most outstanding personalities was Bernabé de las Casas, owner of an immense estate that began in the northeast of Monterrey and reached the present limits of Colima. The division of his land among his heirs gave rise to the haciendas of San Francisco de las Canas, the Pueblito, Chipinque and Our Lady of Guide (or Eguía), which in the nineteenth century would become the villages of Mina, Hidalgo, El Carmen and Abasolo, respectively.

The colonial era of Monterrey was characterized by the constant struggle for power over land. The vast majority of its population was in the military, in service to the King. They gathered in the main square, which was named the Plaza de Armas, because from there they set out to battle and congregated twice a year, on 25 July and 25 November.

== Eighteenth century ==
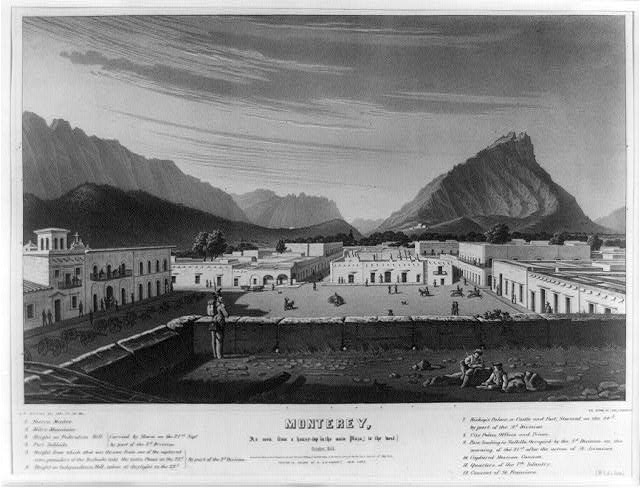
Plaza de Armas (Zaragoza) 1846.

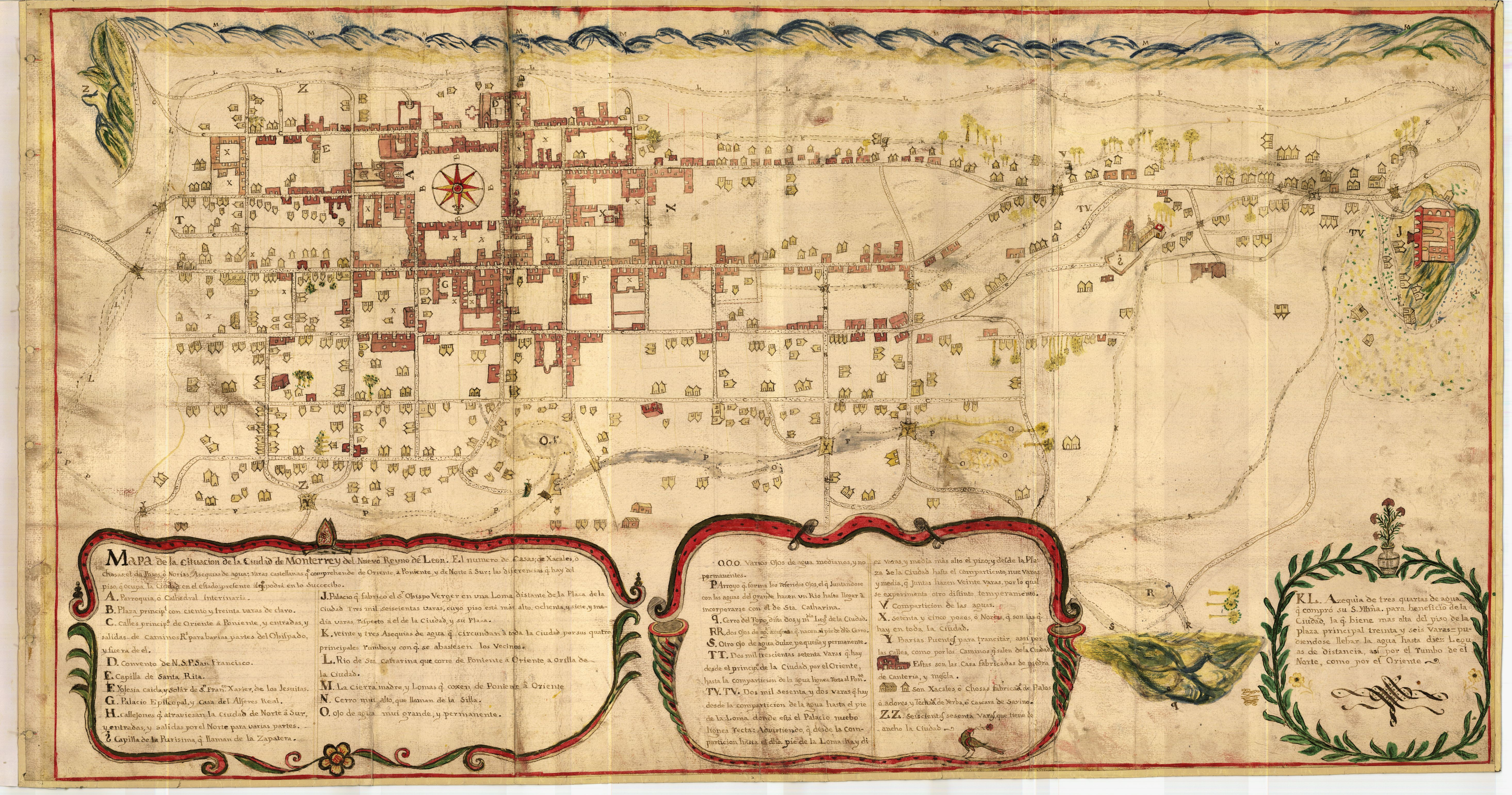
Map of the city of Monterrey, 1791.

=== Monterrey religious establishments ===
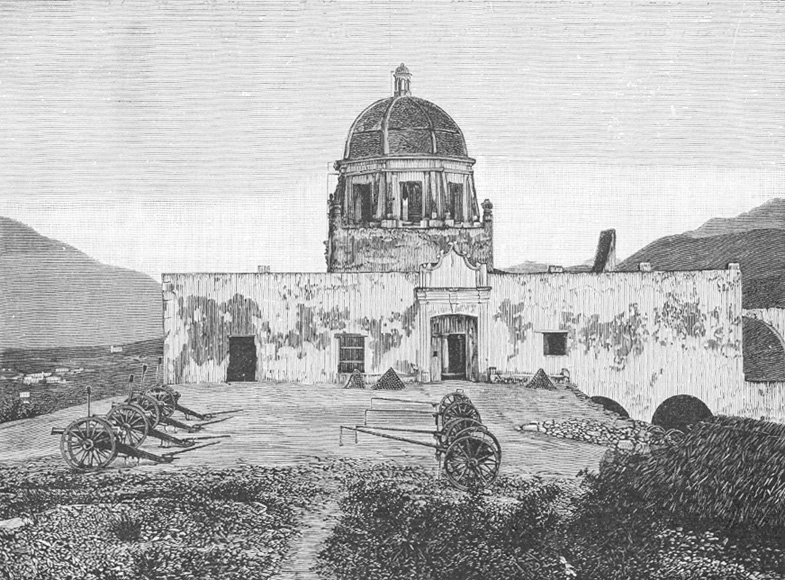
Antiguo Palacio Episcopal de Monterrey de 1787. Estampa de 1901.

The second bishop, Rafael José Verger requested that the headquarters be in Monterrey and not in Saltillo or Múzquiz as Teodoro de Croix, the commander of the internal provinces of that era, wanted. Velanger built his residence -the current bishopric- in the Loma de la Chepevera and wanted the cathedral to be in that area as well. This did not take place. Finally the king issued the order for the ecclesiastical council to be based in Monterrey in 1789, and on 10 November 1792, a bishopric was established in the city of Monterrey under bishop Andrés Ambrosio de Llanos and Valdés. This brought in the architect Juan Crouset in 1794 for a project to expand the city and construct a new cathedral, but the project was left unfinished because of the opposition of the governor.

== Nineteenth century ==
=== Mexican independence ===
When the news that Miguel Hidalgo had risen in arms against the Spanish power came to Monterrey, the governor of Nuevo León, Santa Maria, sent the commander Juan Ignacio Ramón south to contain the insurgents. Rather than contain the insurgency, Ramon quickly joined the insurgent group led by Mariano Jimenez. Santa Maria also ended up joining the independence movement.

From Saltillo, Jimenez sent Juan Bautista Carrasco and Ignacio Camargo to Monterey to control the northern populations. On 26 January 1811, he arrived in Monterrey where he was received with jubilation. There he appointed governor Jose Santiago Villareal and returned to Saltillo on hearing of the defeat of Hidalgo. A counterrevolutionary group formed in Texas ended up shooting Santa Maria and Juan Ignacio Ramón. Upon their death, the Monterrey Governing Board was established, chaired by Blas José Gómez (1813). Guerrilla activity, headed by José Herrera, Pedro Baez Treviño, José María Sada and many other insurgents, remained constant during the Revolutionary Era. On 3 July 1821 Gaspar López, governor of Nuevo León, proclaimed adherence to the Plan of Iguala and the Independence of Moneterrey.

=== Battle of Monterrey ===
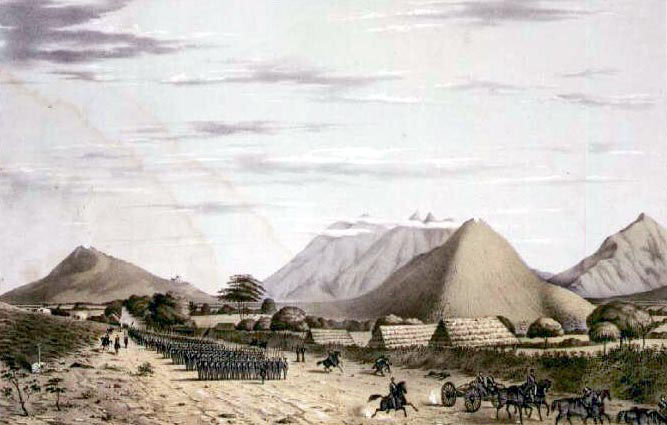
Army General Worth marching on Monterrey 1846.

After the country's independence from the Spanish Crown and the foundation of Mexico in 1821, the governments of Mexico and the United States fought the Mexican-American War, which resulted in the loss of more than half of Mexico's national territory. On 23 September 1846 General William J. Worth besieged the city and a battle between the two countries was fought from Cerro del Obispado to the Villa de Guadalupe, known as the Battle of Monterrey. American troops remained in the Mexican territory until 1848 and the Mexico-American War ended with the treaty of Guadalupe Hidalgo in which the conflicting parties agreed that the United States would acquire the territories of Alta California and New Mexico, and the territory between the Nueces River and the Rio Grande, claimed by the Republic of Texas.

== Porfiriato ==
=== Bernardo Reyes ===
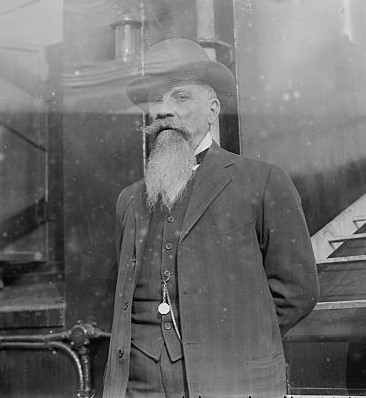
Bernardo Reyes (1909).

== Twentieth century ==
=== Mexican Revolution ===
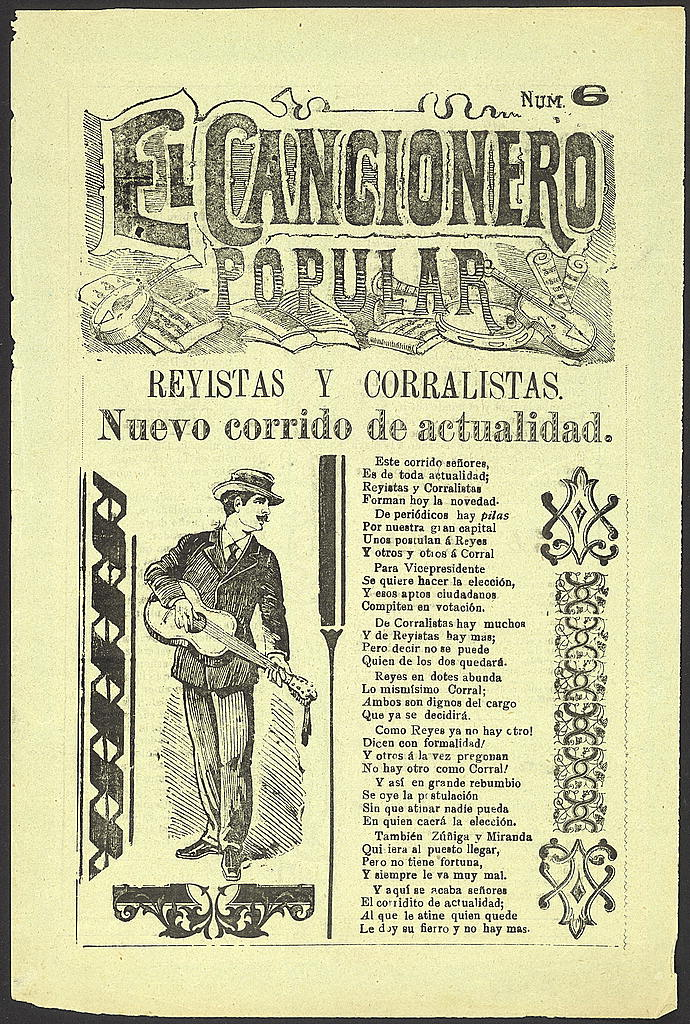
Corrido 1909 sobe the supposedly free and democratic election campaign for vice president from Bernardo Reyes and Ramón Corral and Porfirio Díaz and Francisco I. Madero for the presidency in 1910.

Dissatisfaction with the extensive and dictatorial rule of Porfirio Díaz was widespread in Mexico in the early twentieth century. Around 1900 Reyes traveled to Mexico City to replace the Minister of War. Having been absent from Monterrey for two years, the anti-government groups became more visible, especially those derived from students in law school. In 1902, Reyes returned to Monterrey to fulfill his mandate as governor of the state, and with the support of Diaz, began campaigning for re-election. The opposition then began acting more forcefully. In addition to the editorials that they had been publishing for years, they also published manifestos in favor of individual rights and free elections, and against dictatorship.

On 2 April 1903, a date when the nation celebrated the triumph of Porfirio Díaz, the supporters of Reyes gathered in Zaragoza square to hear the governor's speech. But, at the same time, the opposition consisting of supporters of the Great Electoral State Convention, gathered in the Alameda. Confrontation between the two groups proved fatal. By the end of the day, eight were dead and 70 wounded, and a hundred prominent supporters of the convention were imprisoned.

After the storm came the calm. Reyes took power for the fourth time. His popularity grew in the country and he was seen as the ideal candidate to replace Diaz. Porfirio once again introduced his candidacy as president, and Ramón Corral was chosen as vice president . The popularity of Reyes at the national level was seen as a threat to the plans of Diaz.

A natural disaster in Monterrey was preamble to the disaster that the Mexican Revolution meant for the Diaz regime. On 28 August 1909 the Santa Catarina River overflowed its banks, causing the worst disaster in history of the city. "The victims numbered in the thousands and the material damages were incalculable."

A few months later Reyes was removed from the national political scene. when Diaz sent him to Europe on a supposed military mission.

The atmosphere in the country was tumultuous in the first two decades of the twentieth century. Battles intensified after the death of President Francisco I. Madero. Dissatisfaction with the regime of Victoriano Huerta by many sectors of the country led Venustiano Carranza to ignore the Huerta government with the Plan of Guadalupe of 1913 and start a constitutionalist revolution.

On 23 October 1913, the carrancistas forces under the command of General Pablo González, Jesus Carranza and Antonio I. Villarreal came to Monterrey. They organized into squads and took over a bishopric, while others occupied the barracks on the corner of Madero and Corona streets, where the school is now. Other revolutionaries came to the Alameda and invaded the prison, which was in Pino Suarez, between Arramberri and Espinoza. Although the federal forces were entrenched in the markets, the revolutionary forces managed to overtake them and capture the Villa de Guadalupe. That same day the insurgent forces reached Mina Street, Gulf Station, where they established their cuartel-. In the smelter they tried to approach the Government palace and arrived at the southern end of the Santa Catarina (San Luisito) river.

=== Constitutionalist government ===
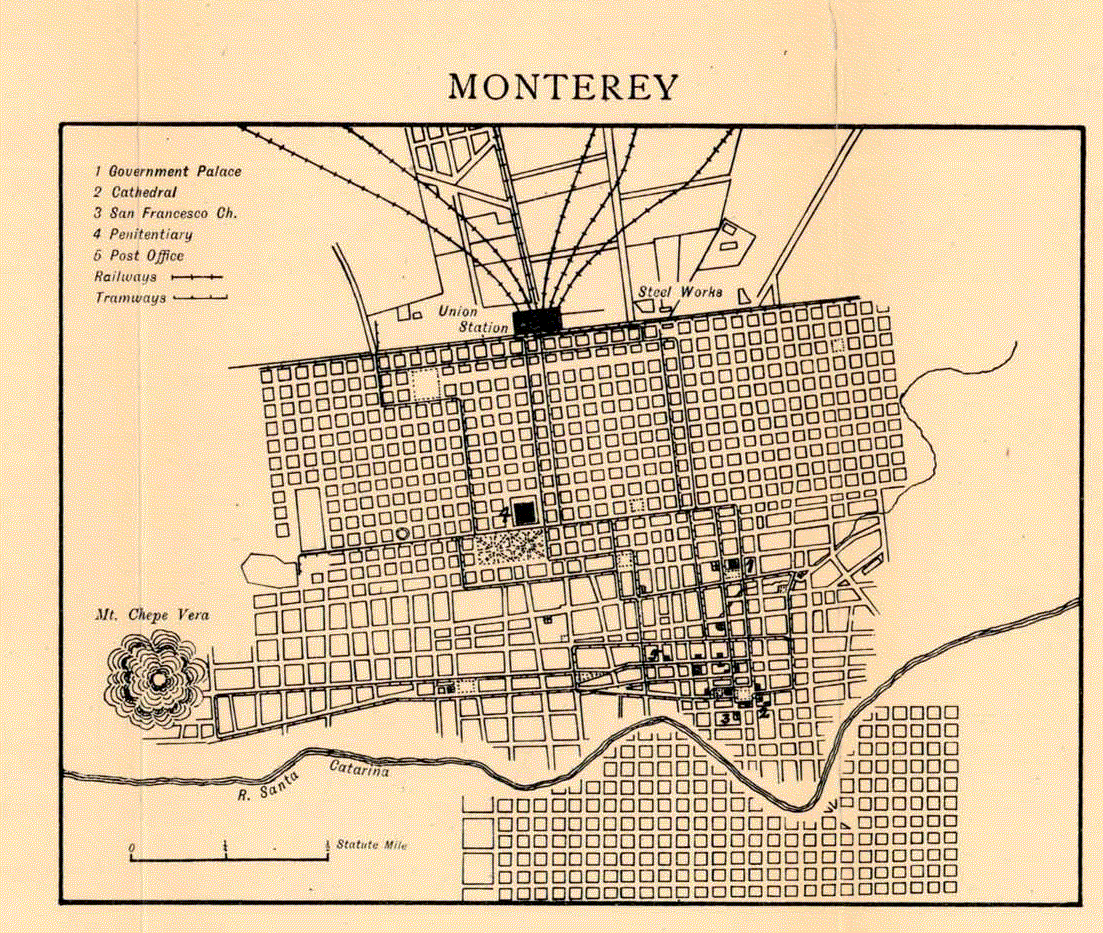
Sketch of Monterrey 1919.

The turbulence of the revolution not only resulted in the Constitution of 1917, but in Monterrey and throughout the state led to banditry, which had to be controlled by the first constitutional government of Nicéforo Zambrano. Following the revolution there was also an outbreak of Spanish influenza that, in the city alone, killed 717 people.

=== Urban and cultural expansion ===
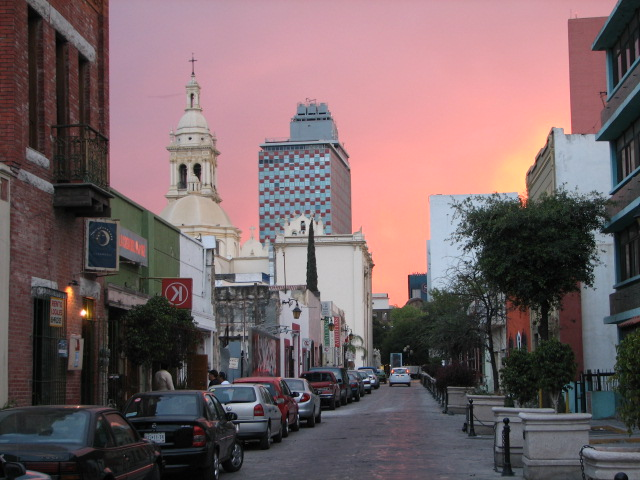
Center City Monterrey at the bottom is the Condominium Steel of the decade of the 60s.

The state government created the institutions of Fornerrey and Provileon to help poor people with housing problems. During the 60's the city began to grow vertically with the creation of the Acero Condominiums and the Constitucion Apartments.

The metropolitan area extended its perimeters, invading the municipalities of Guadalupe, Garza García, Santa Catarina, San Nicolás, General Escobedo, Apodaca, etc.

In the 1930s, the city began to develop culturally. In 1933 the Universidad Autónoma de Nuevo León (UANL) was established, followed by the Instituto Tecnológico de Estudios Superiores de Monterrey (ITESM). ten years later. Not long after that, the Ciudad Universitaria y el Campus del Tec was established.

=== Macroplaza ===
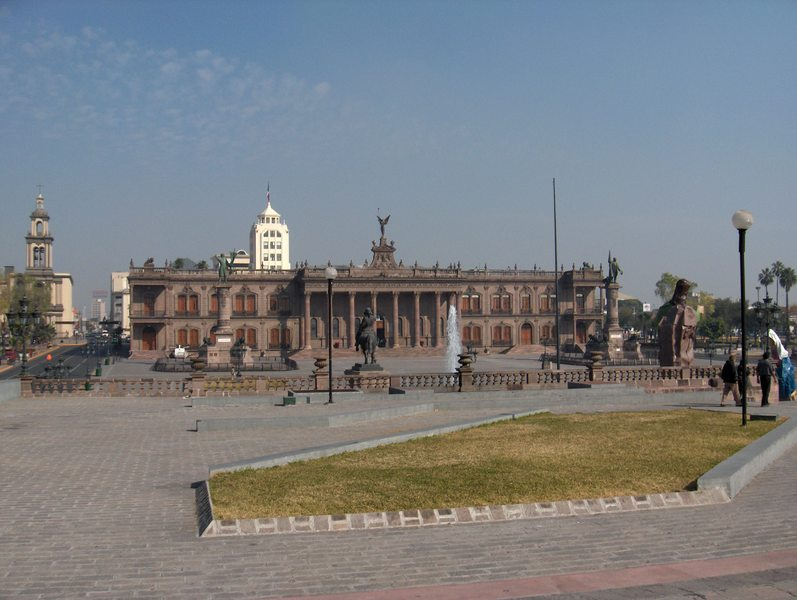
Explanada de los Héroes en un extremo de la Macroplaza. Fachada del Palacio Municipal con el edificio de correos al fondo.

The Legislative Palace, the City Theater, The Department of Education and Culture, the State Treasury, Administrative Tower, Central Library, the Infonativit Building, the State Archives, and the Superior Court (built later by Governor Jorge A Trevino) were all constructed in the Macroplaza area.

Artistic works in the Marcroplaza include "The Fountain of Life", and the sculptures "Escobedo", "Hidalgo", and "Morelos" by Luis Sanguino, the Faro de Comercio by Luis Barragan, and "Homage to the Sun" by Rufino Tamayo, There are also sculptures by Fidias Elizondo, Federico Cantú and other artists. In the Esplanade of the Heroes, which is part of the Macroplaza, the remains of some of the governors of Nuevo León are conserved, including Juan Zuazua, Antonio I. Villarreal, Pablo González, J. Silvestre Arramberri y Bernardo Reyes.

== See also ==
- Timeline of Monterrey, Mexico

== Bibliography ==
- Cavazos Garza, Israel Breve historia de Nuevo León Publicado por Fondo de Cultura Económica, México 1994 231 páginas Digitalizado el 18 March 2008. ISBN 968-16-4541-3, 9789681645410
- Cavazos Garza, Israel La Enciclopedia de Monterrey Publicado por El Diario de Monterrey, 1996 Procedente de Universidad de Texas Digitalizado el 27 June 2008 ISBN 970-05-0693-2, 9789700506937.
- De Cardona, S. Adalberto, Sánchez, Trinidad México y sus capitales: Reseña histórica del país desde los tiempos más remotos hasta el presente; en la cual también se trata de sus riquezas naturales México 1900 Publicado por Tip. de J. Aguilar Vera y comp. (s. en c.), Procedente de la Biblioteca Pública de Nueva York Digitalizado el 19 Dic 2007.
- Eling, Herbert H., El Arte Mobiliario del Noreste de México INAH Vol XXIII Coahuila 2002
- Flores, Óscar Monterrey en la Revolución 1909–1923 Universidad de Monterrey /Ayuntamiento de Monterrey. San Pedro Garza García, 2006. ISBN 968-6858-17-2.
- Flores, Óscar Monterrey Industrial Publicado por Oscar Flores Torres ISBN 968-6858-21-0, 9789686858211.
- García, Gerardo Documentos inéditos ó muy raros para la historia de México México 1908, Tomo XVIII. Publicado por Vda. de C. Bouret Procedente de Universidad de Texas. Digitalizado el 27 May 2008.
- Murray, William Breen, Rock Art and Site Environment at Boca de Potrerillos, N.L. México American Indian Rock Art 7–8 El Toro, Ca., 1982, 57–68.
- Murray, William Breen, Arte Rupestre en Nuevo León Cuadernos del Archivo 13, Monterrey México 1987.
- Olson, Jon Petroglyphs of Boca de Potrerillos, manuscrito, Departamento de Antropología Los Angeles Univ Estatal de California 1981.
- Peñafiel, Antonio Censo general de la República Mexicana verificado el 28 de octubre de 1900: Conforme a las instrucciones de la Dirección General de Estadística a cargo de Dr. Antonio Peñafiel Publicado por Oficina Tip. de la Secretaría de Fomento, México 1901 Procedente de Universidad de Texas Digitalizado el 15 November 2007 p. 8.
- Snodgrass, Michael, Deferencia y desafío en Monterrey: trabajadores, paternalismo y revolución en México, 1890–1950 (Fondo Editorial de Nuevo León)
- Turpin, Solveig A., Herbert H. Eling, Jr. y Valdez Moreno Moisés, From Marshland to Desert: The Prehistoric Environment of Boca de Potrerillos, Nuevo León México, North American Archeologist 14 (4) Nueva York, Baywood Publishing Co., 1993 pp. 305–323
- Velasco, Alfonso Luis Geografía y Estadística de la República Mexicana Alfonso Luis Velasco México 1892 Procedente de la Universidad de Michigan Digitalizado el 18 July 2006 p. 101.
- Vellinga, Menno Industrialización, burguesía y clase obrera en México: El caso de Monterrey México, 1989 Publicado por Siglo XXI, . 288 páginas. ISBN 968-23-1536-0, 9789682315367.
