= Timeline of Monterrey =

Coordinates: 25.666667°N 100.3°W

The following is a timeline of the history of the city of Monterrey, Nuevo León, Mexico.

== Prior to 20th century ==
- 1560 - Santa Lucia de León founded.
- 1584 - Ojos de Santa Lucia outpost established by Spaniards.
- 1596 - Settlement named "Ciudad Metropolitana de Nuestra Senora de Monterrey" by Diego de Montemayor and made a city.
- 1603 - Cathedral construction begins.
- 1730 - Church of San Francisco rebuilt.
- 1775 - Population: 258.
- 1777 - Monterrey becomes seat of Catholic Linares bishopric.
- 1790 - Bishop's Palace built.
- 1791 - Monterrey Cathedral building completed.
- 1824 - Monterrey becomes capital of Nuevo León state.
- 1833 - Cathedral consecrated.
- 1846 - Battle of Monterrey - town occupied by United States forces.
- 1847 - American Pioneer newspaper begins publication.
- 1864 - Town occupied by French forces.
- 1866 - French occupation ends.
- 1881 - Railway constructed.
- 1890 - Cerveceria Cuauhtemoc (brewery) founded.
- 1892 - Monterrey News English-language newspaper in publication.
- 1896 - El Espectador newspaper begins publication.
- 1899 - Banco Mercantil de Monterrey established.
- 1900 - Population: 62,266.

== 20th century ==
- 1901 - Monterey and Mexican Gulf Railroad sold.
- 1908 - Palacio de Gobierno built.
- 1909 - 28 August: Flood.
- 1919 - El Porvenir newspaper begins publication.
- 1936 - February: Antigovernment demonstration.
- 1940 - Population: 190,074.
- 1943 - Monterrey Institute of Technology and Higher Education established.
- 1945
  - Club de Fútbol Monterrey formed.
  - Cine Elizondo opens.
- 1946 - Iglesia de La Purisima church built.
- 1950 - Population: 331,771.
- 1960 - Population: 601,086; metro 708,400.
- 1969 - Universidad de Monterrey and Universidad Regiomontana established.
- 1977 - Monterrey College of Music and Dance established.
- 1983 - Galerías Monterrey shopping mall in business.
- 1984 - Gran Plaza opens.
- 1988
  - September: Hurricane Gilbert.
  - Plaza Fiesta San Agustín shopping mall in business.
- 1990 - Labor Party (Mexico) founded in Monterrey.
- 1991 - Monterrey Metro begins operating.

== 21st century ==
- 2002 - Monterrey Mexico Temple (an LDS Church) dedicated.
- 2005 - Paseo San Pedro shopping mall in business.
- 2006 - KidZania (leisure centre) in business.
- 2010 - Population: 1,135,512; metro 4,089,962.
- 2011 - Air pollution in Monterrey reaches annual mean of 36 PM2.5 and 86 PM10, more than recommended.
- 2012 - May: Cadereyta Jiménez massacre occurs near city.

== See also ==
- History of Monterrey
- List of municipal presidents of Monterrey
- History of Nuevo León

== Bibliography ==
- Alfred Ronald Conkling (1893), "Monterey", Appletons' Guide to Mexico, New York: D. Appleton & Company
- Henry Moore (1894), "Commercial Directory: Monterey", Railway Guide of the Republic of Mexico, Springfield, Ohio: Huben & Moore, OCLC 22498265
- Guide to Monterey. Monterey Guide Pub. 1894.
- Reau Campbell (1909), "Monterey", Campbell's New Revised Complete Guide and Descriptive Book of Mexico, Chicago: Rogers & Smith Co., OCLC 1667015
- "Monterrey" . Encyclopædia Britannica. Vol. 18 (11th ed.). 1910. p. 774.
- W.H. Koebel, ed. (1921), "Mexico: Chief Towns: Monterey", Anglo-South American Handbook, vol. 1, New York: Macmillan, hdl:2027/mdp.39015027978728
- Ernst B. Filsinger (1922), "Mexico: Monterey", Commercial Travelers' Guide to Latin America, Washington, DC: Government Printing Office
- Samuel N. Dicken (1939). "Monterrey and Northeastern Mexico". Annals of the Association of American Geographers. 29 (2): 127–158. doi:10.2307/2560958. JSTOR 2560958.
- Harley L. Browning and Waltraut Feindt (1971). "Patterns of Migration to Monterrey, Mexico". International Migration Review. 5 (3): 309–324. doi:10.1177/019791837100500304. JSTOR 3002646. S2CID 147067883.
- "Social and Economic Context of Migration to Monterrey, Mexico," in Francine F. Rabinovitz and Felicity M. Trueblood, eds., Latin American Urban Annual, Vol. 1 (Beverly Hills, California: Sage Publications, 1971)
- Alex Saragoza, The Monterrey Elite and the Mexican State, 1880-1940 (Austin, 1988)
- José Luis Lezama (1994). "Mexico: Monterrey". In Gerald Michael Greenfield (ed.). Latin American Urbanization: Historical Profiles of Major Cities. Greenwood Press. ISBN 0313259372.
- Vivienne Bennett. 1995. The Politics of Water: Urban Protest, Gender, and Power in Monterrey, Mexico. Pittsburgh: University of Pittsburgh Press
- "Northeast Mexico: Monterrey", Mexico, Lonely Planet, 1998 (fulltext via OpenLibrary)
- Michael David Snodgrass (1998). "Birth and Consequences of Industrial Paternalism in Monterrey, Mexico, 1890-1940". International Labor and Working-Class History (53): 115–136. JSTOR 27672459.
- "Northeast Mexico: Nuevo Leon: Monterrey", Mexico, Let's Go, 1999 (fulltext via OpenLibrary)
- John Fisher (1999), "Between the Sierras: Northeast Routes: Monterrey", Mexico, Rough Guides (4th ed.), London, p. 151+, OL 24935876M
- David Marley (2005), "Monterrey", Historic Cities of the Americas, vol. 1, Santa Barbara, California: ABC-CLIO, pp. 267–276, ISBN 1576070271
