= Francisco Cano =

Spanish 16th century conquistador

Lieutenant Major Francisco Cano
- Born: Spain
- Died: 1500s
- Occupations: Conquistador; Explorer
- Known for: Exploring Northern Mexico, in what is today Nueva Galicia
- Military career
- Allegiance: Spanish Empire
- Branch: Spanish Army
- Rank: Lieutenant Major
- Commands: Mines of Mazapil
- Conflicts: Aftermath of the Conquest of the Aztec Empire
- Other work: Explorer and landowner

Francisco Cano (fl. 1560s) was a Spanish conquistador and explorer who travelled the north of Mexico to find gold and other precious metals in the 16th century. He served as Lieutenant Major of the Mazapil mines in the 1560s and discovered a lake in Mexico which led to further colonization of the area. He is considered important to the colonization of what is today New Mexico because of his opening up of supply lines in Zacatecas. His work in the mines was a major asset in the expanding metal trade that played a large role in the expansion of the Spanish economy throughout the world.

== Early life ==
Cano probably grew up in Spain, where men of all ages were being recruited to go on voyages to the New World to explore and conquer more territory for the Empire.

== Lieutenant Major ==
He became a Lieutenant Major in the Spanish Army in New Spain, and presided over the gold mines in Mazapil. One of his main objectives was to find precious metal deposits in the northern areas of New Spain.

=== Exploring New Galicia ===
By the 1560s, the Spanish had conquered the Aztec Empire and were pushing into what is today northern Mexico. On November 6, 1568, Cano reported discovering a new lake which he christened the "Lago de Nuevo Mexico". He had been serving as lieutenant major of the mines of Mazapil at the time.

==== Lake of New Mexico ====
In late 1568, Cano and the 16 soldiers under his command came upon a large lake while looking for gold and silver mines in the area. There were a large number of small Indian villages which the Spanish referred to as rancherías, as well as many Chichimeca Indians, mostly fishermen. He called his discovery the Lake of New Mexico, with the approval of the 16 soldiers under his command. The lake that he had discovered was not actually in what would today be considered the state of New Mexico in the United States. Instead, it most likely was in what is today Zacatecas in Mexico proper. The exploration of the area was the final conquest of the Aztec legacy and led to a strong Spanish footprint in the area.

== Land claims ==
Cano made a number of land claims relating to areas he had found during his time as an explorer. He claimed the right of discovery on the shores of the lagune of Tlahualia, which would lead to later settlement of Parras de la Fuente, a city located in the southern part of the Mexican state of Coahuila.

== See also ==
- History of Mexico
