= Luis de Carvajal y de la Cueva =

16th-century crypto-Jewish Mexican politician

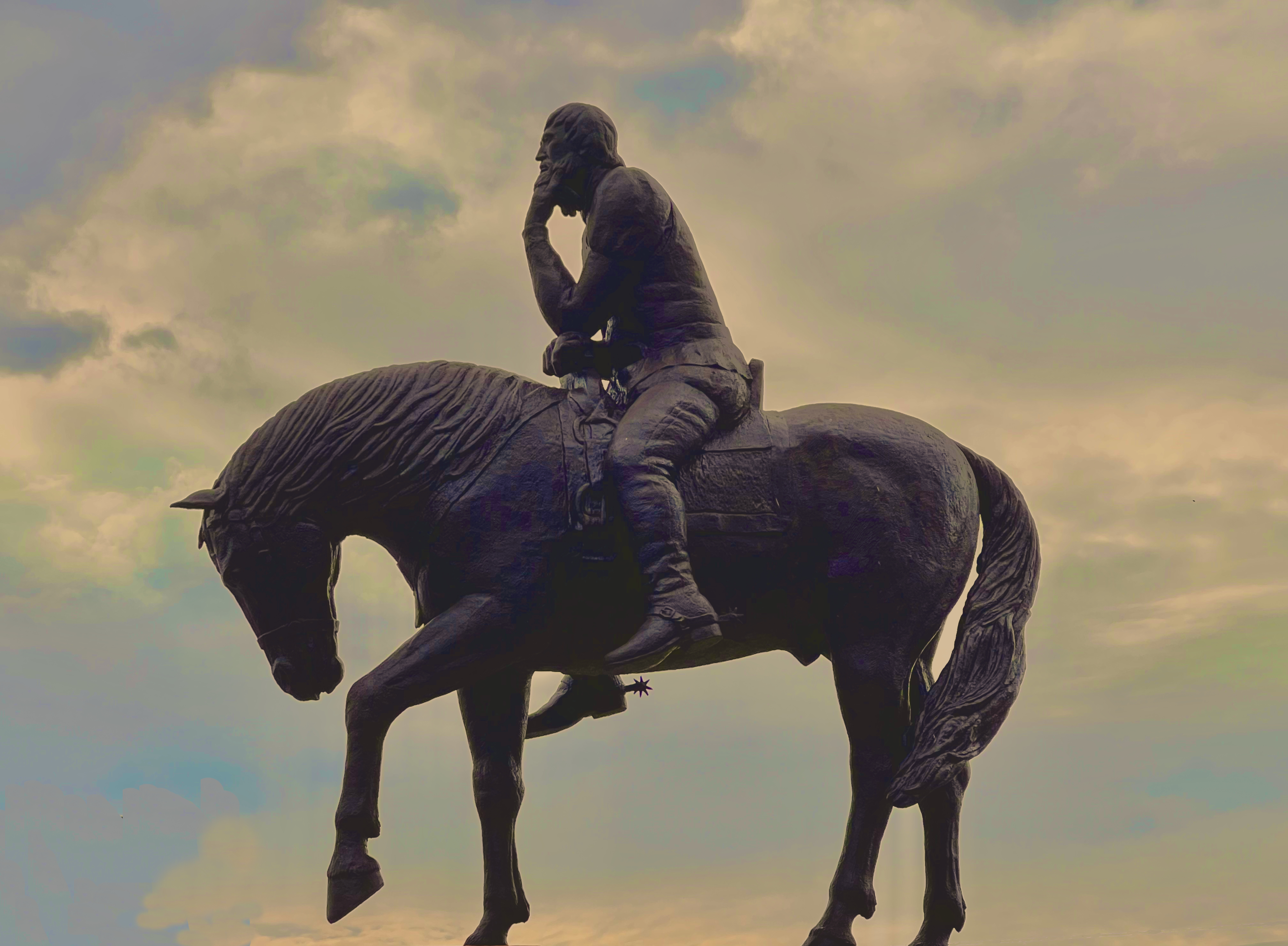
- Born: Luis de Carvajal c. 1537; Mogadouro, Kingdom of Portugal
- Died: 13 February 1591; Mexico City, Viceroyalty of New Spain
- Other name: Luis de Carabajal
- Known for: First governor of Nuevo Reino de León; prosecuted by the Mexican Inquisition
- Office: 1st Governor of Nuevo Reino de León
- Term: 1580–1588
- Successor: Diego de Montemayor

Luis de Carvajal (Portuguese: Luis do Carvalhal; sometimes Luis de Carabajal y de la Cueva) (c. 1537 – 13 February 1591) was a Portuguese colonial official and merchant who served as governor of the Spanish Empire's province of Nuevo León in present-day Mexico, best known as the first Spanish subject known to have entered Texas from Mexico across the lower Rio Grande. He was reputed to be a dealer in Native American slaves.

He was a Portuguese-born, Spanish Crown officer, who in 1579 was awarded a large swath of territory in New Spain, known as Nuevo Reino de León. He was born in Mogadouro, Portugal, around 1537, but was raised in the Kingdom of León at the home of the Count of Benavente, a contemporary and friend of Philip II of Spain, who named Carvajal Governor of Nuevo Reino de León and granted him many privileges on the basis of previous services to the Spanish Crown.

The territory granted to Carvajal included some portions in the south that had been settled by other Spaniards who refused to accept the terms of the grant and sued Carvajal before the highest court in New Spain. The suits were decided in favor of Carvajal, but Álvaro Manrique de Zúñiga, 1st Marquess of Villamanrique, viceroy of New Spain, ordered the arrest of Carvajal in 1588. Carvajal was accused of enslaving large numbers of Indians, a major grievance of the indigenous population fueling the Chichimeca War. Carvajal was also accused of several other offenses by the Inquisition in Mexico City, but only the charge of concealing that his relatives secretly practiced Judaism was upheld. Sentenced to exile, he was sent back to the court's jail, where he died a year later.

== Background ==
Carvajal was born circa 1537 in Mogadouro, Portugal, to Gaspar de Carvajal and Catalina de León, descendants of Jewish conversos (converts to Catholicism).

When he was eight years old, his family took him to Benavente, in the Spanish Kingdom of León. There, he was placed, probably as a page, in the house of the Count of Benavente, where he learned the manners and language of a Spanish nobleman. He lived there until his maternal uncle, Duarte de León, a wealthy Portuguese contractor sent him to the Portuguese islands of Cape Verde. There Carvajal learned a variety of skills, including navigation, accounting, and probably some military skills. In 1560, D. Sebastian, king of Portugal, named him treasurer for the assets of the deceased.

In 1564, Carvajal left Cape Verde and went to Seville, where he married Guiomar Nuñez or Nunes, later known as Guitar de Ribera (1545–1582), the oldest daughter of Miguel Nuñez or Nunes (died 1577), a Portuguese-born converso merchant stationed in Santo Domingo as an agent in the slave trade. By the time Carvajal married, his father-in-law was involved in the transportation of wheat, a lucrative business in those days. He joined the business for about two years, but abandoned it because of his ambitious plans.

== First sojourn in New Spain ==
In 1567, Carvajal sailed for New Spain in his own ship as Admiral of a merchant fleet that sailed from the Canary Islands. Upon his arrival in Veracruz, he purchased a cattle hacienda near Tampico, and settled in that village, become its mayor the following year. In late 1568, Carvajal captured 78 Englishmen marooned on the Tamaulipas coast by John Hawkins, who had lost some of his ships in a fight with the Spanish fleet at Veracruz.

In 1572, Viceroy Martín Enríquez de Almanza commissioned Carvajal a captain, sending him to open a road through the mountains between the Pánuco and Mazapil. This long expedition resulted in the discovery, by Carvajal, of a mountain pass that allowed him to achieve his goal and enabled him to discover the lands that later become Nuevo Reino de León. After that expedition was completed, Carvajal was sent to chastise hostile Indian bands at the mouth of the Río Bravo (Rio Grande). He claimed to have punished the natives responsible for the massacre of 400 castaways from three ships wrecked on the coast en route to and from Spain. During the campaign, he crossed the lower Rio Grande into what is now Texas.

Due to his reputation as an Indian fighter, Viceroy Enríquez de Almanza commissioned him in 1575 to join Capt. Francisco de Puga to pacify a large area north of Mexico City centered in Xalpa (present day Jalpan de Serra, Queretaro). The Indian tribes collectively known as Chichimecas had destroyed the Catholic missions in the area. Carvajal, using Indian labor, built a fort and resettled a large number of "pacified" Indians near the fort, a policy known in Spanish Latin America as reductions. However, whatever victories he achieved did not endure as the local Indians, the Pames, soon resumed the war. During this period, Carvajal continued his business dealings by trading in slaves and cochineal.

In 1578, after obtaining an endorsement from the viceroy and the Audiencia de México for his desire to be granted an important official charge by the king he went to Spain. After lengthy negotiations in the Consejo de Indias, on 31 May 1579 he succeeded in obtaining his desired post, and was awarded a large territory that was to be named Nuevo Reino de León. From South to North that territory extended from Tampico to just below present day Dallas, Texas. A similar distance extended East to west.

Among the privileges granted to Carvajal by the king was that he could recruit, in Spain, up to 100 males, sixty of whom should be married, to be the first colonizers of his Nuevo Reino. Because of time limitations, the king ordered that the requirement that each should show proof of being an Old Christian be waived. This was not the only time the king did so, but it did result in the recruitment of several New Christians, including Carvajal's sister, Francisca de Carvajal, and her family, all of whom were later found to secretly practice Judaism and were burnt at the stake by the Spanish Inquisition in Mexico City. Carvajal was also instructed to civilize, pacify, and Christianize the Indians in his domain, but forbidden to enslave them, an injunction he "never obeyed" in the words of a Mexican essayist.

== Second sojourn in New Spain ==
In 1579 Phillip II, King of Spain, granted him the title of governor and captain-general with the mission to "discover, pacify and settle" a new province in New Spain to be called New Kingdom of León, 200 leagues inland from the port of Tampico.

The people recruited by Carvajal in Spain and Portugal were transported to the New world in a cargo ship, owned by Carvajal and named La Urca de Panuco. The ship left Seville on 10 June 1580 and arrived in Tampico on 24 August of the same year. The following October he went to Mexico City to present his credentials to the new viceroy, the Count of Coruña.

In consideration of the appointment of governor, Carvajal undertook to colonize the territory at his own expense, being allowed to repay himself out of the revenues. His original jurisdiction was to comprise a somewhat ill-defined territory, beginning at the port of Tampico, extending along the River Pánuco, and thence turning northward; but it was not to exceed 200 leagues either way. It would seem to have included Tamaulipas, as well as the states of Nuevo León and Coahuila, and parts of San Luis Potosí, Zacatecas, Durango, Chihuahua and Texas.

Towards the end of 1581, Carvajal started to settle the lesser-known parts of his territory, founding, as required by his capitulación with the king, several villages. On 10 December 1581, he founded Villa de la Cueva de León, no longer in existence, and in April 1582 he founded, as a city, Ciudad de León, now Cerralvo. About the same time he ordered his captain (and later Lieutenant) Gaspar Castaño de Sosa to found Villa de San Luis, now Monterrey, the capital of the modern Mexican state of Nuevo León. Castaño de Sosa is also known as the leader of the first attempt to establish a Spanish settlement in New Mexico. The attempt failed and Castaño de Sosa was arrested and punished by Spanish authorities for his unauthorized expedition.

As mentioned earlier, the territory granted to Carvajal by Philip II included lands that were contested by other Spaniards living in New Spain. These individuals sued Carvajal in the highest court in New Spain -The Audiencia de México. Lasting more than three years these legal suits were decided in favor of Carvajal. But the litigants did not give up. Taking advantage of a sympathetic prosecutor and of the arrival of a new viceroy, they argued that Carvajal was enslaving pacified Indians.

=== Arrest and trial ===
In late 1588, Carvajal was arrested at Almadén (present day Monclova), which he had allegedly established as a base to carry out slaving raids. Taken to Mexico City, he was imprisoned.

Spanish authorities said the Carvajal had a gang of "more than sixty soldiers" and to have made a fortune capturing and selling Indian slaves. They raided north along the Rio Grande, capturing hundreds of Indians whom they sold into slavery. The government was attempting to find a peaceful solution to the long-running and bloody Chichimeca War. Enslavement was one of the grievances of the Indians and a peaceful solution involved protecting the Indians against slavers. All along the frontier two successive Viceroys promoting peace with the Chichimecas cracked down on the slavers.

New charges were also brought against Carvajal. This was based on the accusations that Carvajal's ancestors were New Christians, which contradicted the "Purity of Blood" laws required to obtain permission to settle in the New Spain. This was sufficient to have Carvajal transferred to the jails of the Inquisition. Although several charges against him were initially mentioned – including enslaving Native Americans, only the charge of covering up the practicing Judaism of his sister and her children remained. In the end he was sentenced to a six-year exile in an auto-da-fé held on 24 February 1590 in Mexico City. However, before the sentence was carried out, he was sent back to the jail of the Court, where he died, nearly one year later, on 13 February 1591.

Members of Carvajal's family were also tried as Crypto-Jews. His nephew, Luis de Carvajal, became the head of a secret Crypto-Jewish community and was burned at the stake in 1596. His autobiography, long thought lost, was rediscovered and is now available online. His two nieces, Ana and María, were not executed with their brother and reaccepted to the Catholic faith; María, accused of relapsing into Judaism, was executed by garrote in an auto da fe on 25 March 1601 in Mexico City, at twenty-nine years of age. Ana was tried again for practicing Judaism in secret and executed by garrote on 11 April 1649, at sixty-seven years of age.

== See also ==
- Mexican Inquisition

== Sources ==
- Cohen, Martin A., "The Martyr", Albuquerque, U of NM Press, 1973.
- Hammond, George P. and Rey, Apapito., The Rediscovery of New Mexico, 1580–1594, Albuquerque: U of NM Press, 1966
- Landis, C.K. Carabajal the Jew, a Legend of Monterey, Vineland, N.J., 1894.
- Palacio, Vicente Riva. El Libro Rojo, Mexico, 1870.
- Toro, Alfonso. La familia Carvajal: Estudio histórico sobre los judíos y la Inquisición de la Nueva España en el siglo XVI (2 vols.), Mexico City: Patria, 1944.
