= Gaspar Castaño de Sosa =

Portuguese colonial settler (c. 1550–c. 1595)

Gaspar Castaño de Sosa (ca. 1550, Portugal – ca. 1595, Molucca) was a Portuguese settler, colonist, explorer, and reputed slaver who was among the founders of the towns of Saltillo and Monclova, in Coahuila, Mexico. He led an expedition, deemed illegal by Spanish authorities, and attempted unsuccessfully to establish a colony in New Mexico in 1590 and 1591.

== Early life ==
Castaño de Sosa was born around 1550 in Portugal. He is believed by many authorities to have been a converso or "Crypto-Jew" – an ostensible Christian who continued to practice Judaism. Castaño appears in the history of northern Mexico about 1579 when along with Luis de Carabajal y Cueva he was one of the early settlers in what became the Mexican state of Nuevo León. Carbajal was governor of the province and Castaño became lieutenant governor. The two men and their group of more than sixty soldiers appear to have supported their colony by enslaving Native Americans. They raided north along the Rio Grande, capturing hundreds of Native Americans they sold into slavery.

== Flight ==
In 1589, Carbajal was arrested for "Judaizing" by the Viceroy of New Spain. Castaño, fearing he would also be arrested, left the colony of Nuevo León and intended to settle in New Mexico, which would also put additional distance between himself and the authorities in Mexico. Unable to obtain official permission for the expedition, he departed without permission from Almaden (now Monclova, Coahuila) on July 27, 1590. Thus, his journey had characteristics of both a flight from prosecution and an exploration. Accompanying Castaño were the 170 Spanish inhabitants of the town, presumably including most or all of the converso settlers. The prospective settlers took with them a large number of livestock and carried their possessions in a slow-moving wagon train. Unlike most expeditions, no Catholic priests accompanied Castaño.

=== The expedition ===
Castaño and his group traveled north from Almaden, crossing the Rio Grande near present-day Del Rio, Texas and Ciudad Acuña. At the Pecos River, near what is now Sheffield, Texas, he chose to follow the river northward. This is the first known Spanish expedition to find its way to the Pecos via this route. Through the Pecos River valley the Spanish encountered Jumano Indian settlements that had been recently abandoned. It is postulated that these communities had anticipated Castaño's arrival and fled. The few Jumanos they met were hostile, and Castano's men had several skirmishes with them.

The expedition followed the Pecos River about 400 miles (640 km) northward to Pecos Pueblo.

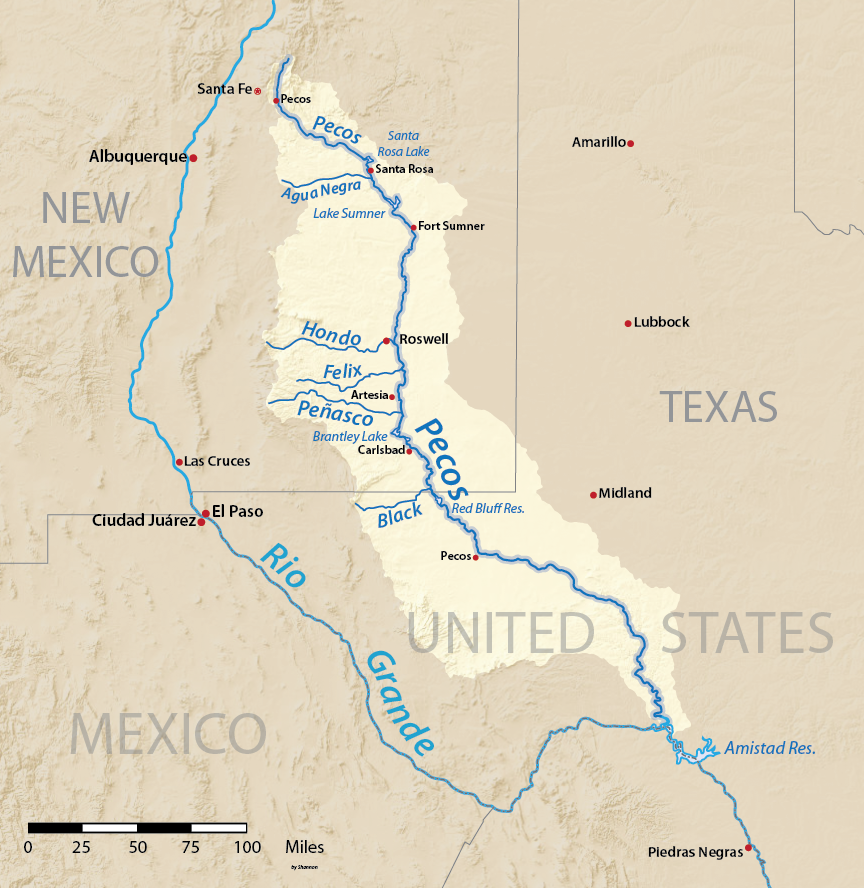
Pecos River watershed

Pecos Pueblo is estimated to have had at the time a population of about 2,000 people. Castaño sent an advance party ahead to the Pueblo and soon they encountered trouble. As Castaño's men recounted the story, the Indians greeted them in a friendly manner, escorted them into town, and then attacked them. Three Spaniards were wounded in the exchange and much of the forward party's equipment and firearms were captured.

In retaliation, Castaño led 40 men and two cannon to Pecos. The inhabitants of Pecos continued to be intransigent, so Castaño shelled the town, killing several and forcing most of the remaining inhabitants to flee. Castano then collected supplies from the Pueblo and proceeded westward toward the Rio Grande. In the bitter cold January 1591, Castaño and his men prospected the area unsuccessfully for deposits of precious minerals. They encountered several Pueblo communities in the Galisteo Basin (near present-day Santa Fe). According to Castaño, they formally took possession of these pueblos by erecting crosses and reading the requerimiento to the inhabitants. Members of the expedition then visited various towns up and down the Rio Grande river valley and explored the nearby mountains for silver. The pueblos had been visited by two expeditions during the preceding decade, Chamuscado and Rodriguez and Antonio de Espejo, so they were familiar with Spaniards. Castaño's expedition was much larger than the previous two, however, and probably more threatening.

Castaño is considered the first to attribute the name "Rio Grande" to the river running through the river valley of the Pueblo Indians. The harsh winter of 1590 to 1591 led to a revolt against Castaño. A group of men sought to return to Mexico and another group threatened his life. The rigors of the journey and the cold winter discouraged many of the aspiring colonists and fortune seekers. Along this retreat, two of Castaño's captured Keresan interpreters, Tomas and Cristobal, were abandoned at Santo Domingo pueblo; they were later re-encountered by Juan de Oñate's official expedition in the summer of 1598.

== Castaño arrest at Santo Domingo Pueblo ==
The Viceroy in Mexico City ordered Captain Juan Morlette to gather 40 soldiers and a priest and go in pursuit of Castaño to arrest him, by force if necessary. Morlette was also instructed to effect the release of any Native American slaves he encountered.

The details of Morlette's expedition to New Mexico are mostly unknown. Rather than taking the Pecos River route followed by Castaño, Morlette apparently followed the previous route of Chamuscado/Rodriguez and Espejo down the Conchos River to its junction with the Rio Grande at La Junta and then up the Rio Grande to the Pueblo Indian villages. In late March 1591, Morlete arrived at Santo Domingo Pueblo. He arrested Castaño, who submitted to the arrest without incident. Although Morlete shackled Castaño, he apparently treated him with respect and, after 40 days in which Morlete explored the Pueblo region for himself, he escorted Castaño and his followers back to Mexico.

== Castaño's trial and sentencing ==
On March 5, 1593, Castaño de Sosa was convicted of invasion of lands inhabited by peaceful Natives, raising troops, and entry into the province of New Mexico. He was sentenced to six years of exile in the Philippines and performing such duties as might be required by the Governor there under penalty of death if he defaulted from his service. Castaño's sentence was appealed to the Council of the Indies and eventually reversed. The order of the reversal arrived too late for him, however, as he had been killed in the Molucca Islands when Chinese slaves aboard his ship mutinied.
