= Diego de Montemayor =

Spanish conquistador and governor

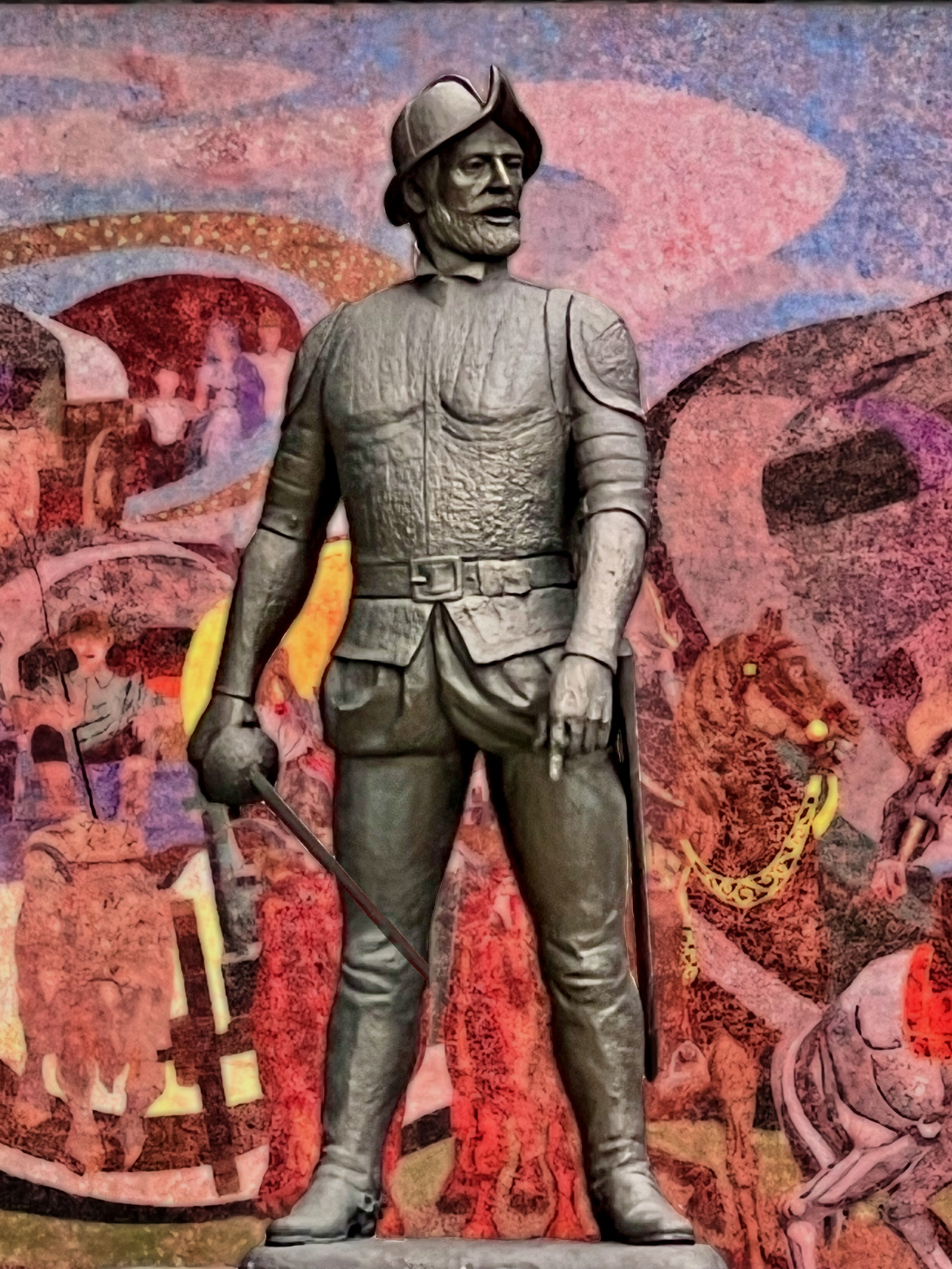
- Sculpture of Diego de Montemayor in the Monterrey fountain

Governor of Nuevo Reino de León
- In office 1588–1610
- Preceded by: Luis de Carabajal y Cueva
- Succeeded by: Diego de Montemayor "el Mozo"

Personal details
- Born: c. 1530 Málaga, Granada, Crown of Castile
- Died: 1610 (aged 79–80) Monterrey, New Kingdom of León, Viceroyalty of New Spain (now Nuevo León, Mexico)
- Spouse(s): Inés Rodríguez; María de Esquivel; Juana Porcallo y de la Cerda
- Children: Diego de Montemayor "el Mozo"; Estefanía de Montemayor; Inés Rodríguez de Montemayor

Diego de Montemayor (c. 1530 – 1611) was a Spanish conquistador, explorer, officer, and the governor of Nuevo Reino de León.

== Early life ==
Historians dispute his date of birth, place of birth, and the identity of his parents. However, Antonio Morales Goméz and Carlos Pérez Maldonado have stated, without proving it, that Montemayor was born in the year 1530. In the Catalogo de Pasajeros a Indias, a certain "Diego de Montemayor" appears to have sailed toward New Spain from Sevilla, he is described to be a resident of Málaga, son of Juan de Montemayor and Mayor Hernández, and the husband of Inés Rodríguez.

== Founding of Monterrey ==
Montemayor is credited with the founding of Monterrey, the capital of the northeastern Mexican state of Nuevo León, on September 20, 1596. The establishment was officially called Ciudad Metropolitana de Nuestra Señora de Monterrey ("Metropolitan City of Our Lady of Monterrey," partly to curry favor from the Viceroy of the time, the Gaspar de Zúñiga y Acevedo, Count of Monterrey. Montemayor's founding was the third effort. The two previous ones bore the names Santa Lucia and San Luis Rey de Francia and were headed by Alberto del Canto, the future arch-enemy of Montemayor, and the second by Luis de Carabajal y Cueva. Montemayor brought forty people with him from Saltillo to populate Monterrey; nine married couples, three men without families, fourteen boys, four girls, and one Indian named Domingo Manuel.

== Personal life ==
Montemayor served as governor of Nuevo León from 1588 to 1610 after he reconquered the province. He may have been married three times. His probable first wife was Inez Rodríguez, who came with him from Spain to the New World in 1548; then second María de Esquivel, and third Juana Porcalla de la Cerda. Montemayor had three children, one from each of his wives. His children were Inez, Diego, and Estefanía.

During the Chichimeca War in 1550, Montemayor was often away from his third wife, Juana Porcallo de la Cerda, and her attention soon focused on Alberto del Canto, only a few years her elder. When Montemayor later confronted her about the ongoing affair, an argument ensued, he drew his sword and killed her. Montemayor fled into the wilderness to the north, but was eventually cleared of all charges (perhaps because a law at the time allowed a man to kill his unfaithful wife). His daughter with Juana Porcallo, Estefanía, later married Alberto del Canto and had three children with him, though the two separated in 1596. Estefanía moved back to Monterrey with her father, and her children took the last name of Montemayor. Montemayor never met his vow to kill Alberto del Canto.

He died about 1611 in Monterrey, and is believed to be buried in the place where the Convento de San Francisco previously was, in the city of Monterrey.
