= New Kingdom of León =

Spanish territory in Mexico (1582–1821)

New Kingdom of León Nuevo Reino de León (Spanish)
- 1582–1821
- Cross of Burgundy, flag of New Spain. Coat of arms

- Viceroyalty of New Spain in 1819.
- Status: Spanish colony
- Capital: Monterrey
- Common languages: Spanish
- Religion: Roman Catholicism
- Government: Monarchy
- King of Spain
  - January 16, 1556 - September 13, 1598: Philip II
  - 1813–1821: Ferdinand VII
- Royal Governor
  - 1580–1588: Luis de Carabajal y Cueva
  - 1795–1810: Simón de Herrera y Leyva
- Historical era: Colonial era
  - Established: 1582
  - Disestablished: 1821

Population
  - 1790: 43,739
- Currency: Spanish colonial real
Succeeded by
First Mexican Empire
- Today part of: Mexico

The New Kingdom of León (Spanish: Nuevo Reino de León), was an administrative territory of the Spanish Empire, politically ruled by the Viceroyalty of New Spain. It was located in an area corresponding generally to the present-day northeastern Mexican state of Nuevo León.

== Origins ==
It was founded in 1582 by Spanish and Portuguese settlers when Philip II, King of Spain and its colonies, encouraged the colonization of Northern New Spain, and authorized the creation of a 'realm' which would have the name of Nuevo Reyno de León (New Kingdom of León), after the former Kingdom of León in Spain. Philip granted Luis de Carabajal y Cueva the title of first governor and captain-general of this new province in New Spain. The foundation of this realm was a crucial event which potentially helped the subsequent Spanish settlements in Texas.

== Language ==
The official language of the settlers was the Spanish language though some settlers spoke the Leonese language from the Kingdom of León in Spain, which evolved with Spanish in the New World.

== History ==
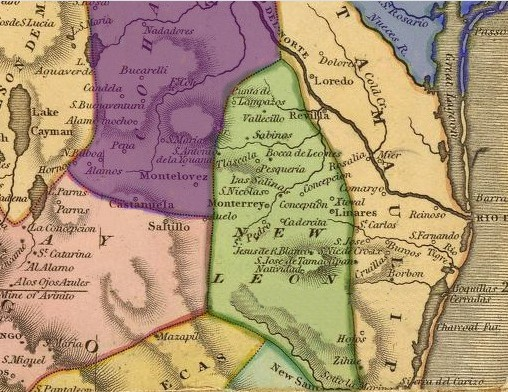
Map of the former provinces of New Spain, depicting the New Kingdom of León (highlighted green).

Though the New Kingdom of León was part of the Viceroyalty of New Spain, it remained functionally autonomous during much of its history, due to the long distance between its main cities; however, it quickly developed a shared culture with its neighbor provinces. This fact led to its becoming in 1776 part of the semi-autonomous Commandancy General of the Provincias Internas, which split in 1786 into three commands, one of them being the Eastern Internal Provinces (Provincias Internas de Oriente) consisting of the New Kingdom of León and the provinces of Coahuila, Tejas, and Nuevo Santander; subsequently it remained part of the comandancy until 1821 when it and the rest of Mexico became an independent republic.

== Today ==
When Mexico declared the independence from Spain, the territory of the Nuevo Reyno de León became the "Estado Libre y Soberano de Nuevo León", or 'Free and Sovereign State of New León.'

== See also ==
- Nuevo León
- History of Nuevo León
- Spanish Empire
- Kingdom of León
