= 2022–present Nuevo León political crisis =

Dispute in Neuvo León, Mexico

The 2022–present Nuevo León political crisis is a period of sustained institutional conflict and political gridlock in the Mexican state of Nuevo León, primarily between the executive branch, led by Governor of Nuevo León Samuel García of the Citizens' Movement (MC), and the Congress of Nuevo León, dominated by the Institutional Revolutionary Party (PRI) and the National Action Party (PAN).

The crisis was triggered by disputes over the appointment of an attorney general, the state budget, and key legislation. García made unprecedented use of his veto power, issuing more than 180 vetoes during his term, and the state entered successive years without a budget approved by Congress, governing instead through budget rollover. In late 2023, the conflict escalated when García requested a leave of absence to pursue the presidency, creating a constitutional crisis over the interim governorship, which paralyzed government functions and briefly left the state with two governors claiming legitimacy.

== Background ==
=== 2021 Nuevo León local elections ===
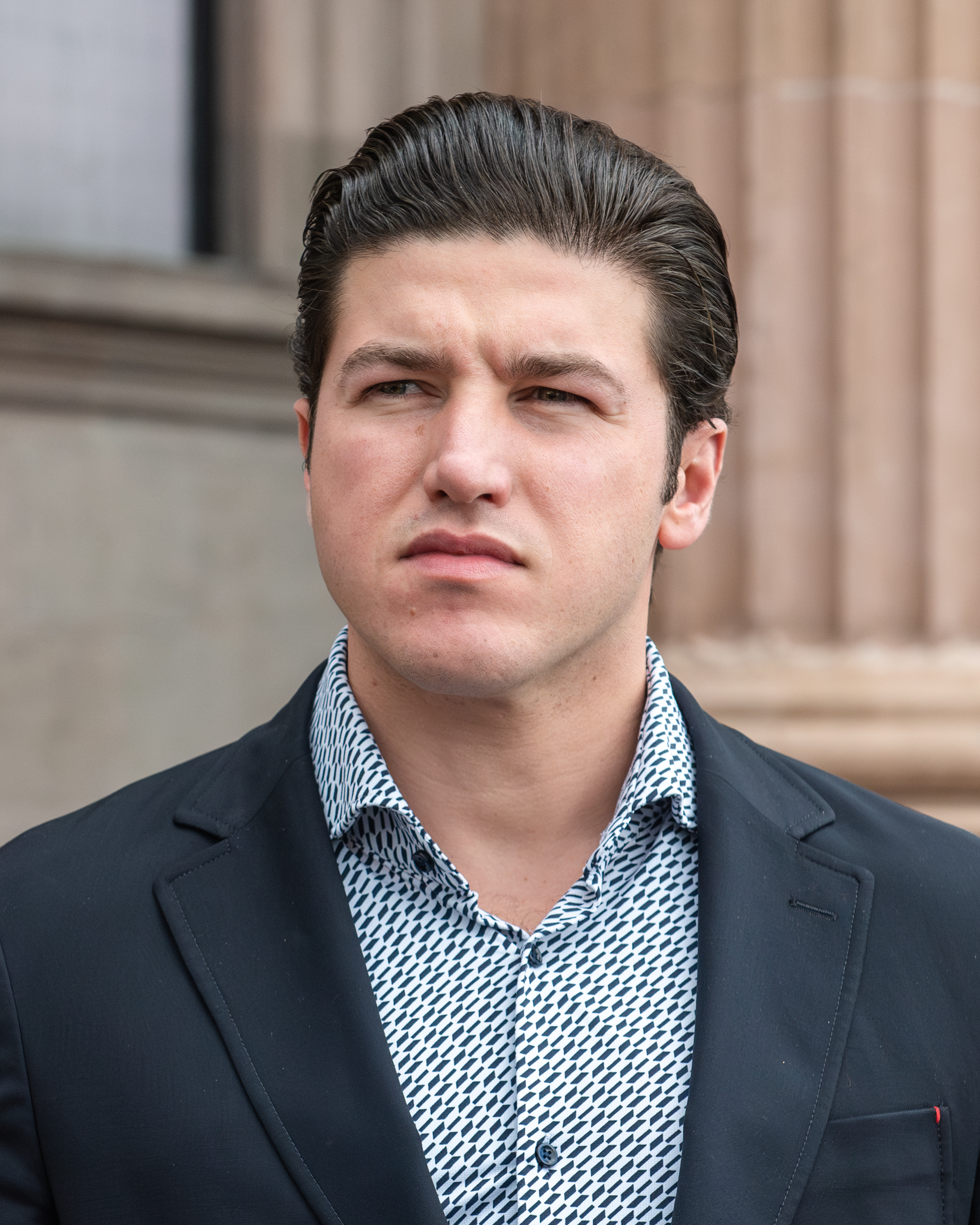
Governor Samuel García in 2022

Samuel García of Citizens' Movement (MC) was elected governor with 36.71% of the vote, defeating his closest rival, Adrián de la Garza, nominated by the Institutional Revolutionary Party (PRI) and Party of the Democratic Revolution (PRD), by over 10 percentage points.

2021 Congress of Nuevo León election results

Election results by party

Election results by coalition

Even though García won the gubernatorial race, it did not translate to the Congress of Nuevo León. MC failed to win a single district seat for the state congress, relying entirely on proportional representation to obtain their 6 seats. Although the National Action Party (PAN) and PRI ran separately in the elections, together they would hold 29 seats, giving them a clear working majority over MC. This left García needing to negotiate with the opposition parties, a situation that resembled that of outgoing independent governor Jaime Rodríguez Calderón, who also lacked legislative support throughout his term.

=== Legal frameworks and procedures ===
==== Appointment of an attorney general ====
The appointment of the Attorney General of Justice in Nuevo León is regulated by Article 159 of the Constitution of the State of Nuevo León. Under this provision, the Congress of Nuevo León must, within ten calendar days of a vacancy, issue a public call inviting qualified individuals to apply. The call remains open for fifteen days to receive applications and the required documentation. Once the list of eligible candidates is finalized, each legislator votes for four individuals, and the four who obtain the highest number of votes make up the official list sent to the Governor, as outlined in sections I and II of the article.

According to section III of Article 159, the Governor then has five days to select a shortlist of three candidates from the list provided by Congress and return it for consideration. The State Congress must elect the Attorney General from this shortlist with a two-thirds majority vote. If no candidate achieves the necessary majority, a runoff vote is held between the two leading candidates. In the event of a tie for second place, an additional vote is held to determine who advances, and if the tie persists, the matter is resolved by drawing lots. If the Governor fails to submit a shortlist within the five-day period, according to section III, the Congress is authorized to make the appointment directly from the original list of four candidates.

== Disputes over institutional control (2022–2025) ==
=== Dispute over the Attorney General ===
==== First dispute (2022–2024) ====
On 5 October 2022, State Attorney General Gustavo Adolfo Guerrero resigned, triggering the process to appoint his successor. Pedro Arce Jardón was appointed as the acting head of the office.

The PRI-PAN bloc advanced the candidacy of Adrián de la Garza, the former Attorney General and former mayor of Monterrey, whom García had defeated in the 2021 gubernatorial election. García opposed this nomination, framing it as a blatant attempt by the "old politics" to install a partisan figure to politically persecute him. García's administration denied de la Garza the required letter of no criminal record, citing judicial suspensions in ongoing lawsuits related to the selection process, which prompted the congress' Anti-Corruption Commission to issue an agreement eliminating this requirement from the process. On 11 November 2022, García vetoed de la Garza from consideration, citing four reasons: the flawed selection process, de la Garza's previous tenure as prosecutor, alleged abuse of authority during the 2021 gubernatorial campaign, and concerns about reinstalling what he deemed "old politics".

García filed a constitutional challenge with the Supreme Court alleging the entire selection process was procedurally flawed. On 14 February 2024, the SCJN sided with García, invalidating both the Anti-Corruption Commission's agreement eliminating the criminal record letter requirement and the candidate list it had approved. The Court ruled that a nine-member committee could not unilaterally change requirements established by the full 42-member legislative plenary, and ordered the process restarted with all original requirements intact. The Congress repeatedly missed the court-mandated deadlines to restart the process, prompting García to file further complaints for contempt. In June 2024, he personally visited the SCJN to press the justices to enforce their ruling.

==== Second dispute (2024) ====
After nearly two years of deadlock, on 31 July 2024, the PRI-PAN bloc restarted the process to appoint the attorney general. The executive branch again declined to issue letters of no criminal record, arguing that the Anti-Corruption Commission was unlawfully seeking to grant a "second opportunity" to aspirants who had failed to submit the document within the original deadline. The state government maintained that the Supreme Court’s ruling required the process to continue only with candidates who had met the initial eligibility requirements. In response, the Anti-Corruption Commission issued a new agreement removing the criminal record letter as a prerequisite. On 12 August, the Congress sent the list of four finalists to García.

On 19 August, García vetoed the entire list, a decision disregarded by Congress on the grounds that the governor was constitutionally allowed to veto only one candidate. On 26 August, during an extraordinary session attended solely by PRI and PAN legislators, the Congress appointed Pedro Arce Jardón, who was selected through a lottery after two voting rounds failed to produce the required two-thirds majority. García immediately challenged the appointment, and on 28 August 2024, the Supreme Court of Justice of the Nation (SCJN) unanimously annulled it, ruling that the Congress had again failed to comply with its February order to restart the process under the original terms, specifically by not requiring all candidates to present the criminal record certificate.

==== Resolution (2025) ====
As part of a broader political deal between the governor and the PRI-PAN opposition, the Congress resumed the selection process on 17 February 2025. The process was expedited, and on the same day, four finalists were unanimously selected. Shortly after receiving the list, García issued a veto, after which the Congress unanimously appointed Javier Flores Saldívar as attorney general in the early hours of 18 February.

=== Disputes over legislation ===
García came into repeated conflict over legislative publication procedures and his broad use of the veto power, which reached unprecedented levels in the state’s history. By his third year in government, he had issued more than 180 vetoes against decrees and reforms approved by the legislature. For comparison, his predecessor, Jaime Rodríguez Calderón—who also governed with an opposition-controlled Congress—had exercised the veto around 80 times during his six-year term.

==== UIFE transfer controversy (2022–2024) ====
On 15 June 2022, the Congress of Nuevo León approved Decree 196, which transferred the functions of the State Financial Intelligence Unit (UIFE) to the newly created Specialized Prosecutor's Office for Financial Intelligence within the Attorney General's Office. The reform was prompted by concerns from PRI and PAN legislators that the UIFE, which investigates financial crimes, was being used by the governor to pursue political opponents.

García refused to publish the decree in the "Periódico Oficial del Estado" (lit. 'Official State Gazette'), arguing that it violated the separation of powers and infringed upon executive authority. The state legislature subsequently filed a constitutional controversy before the Supreme Court. On 23 November 2023, the Court's First Chamber ruled that the governor’s failure to publish the decree was unconstitutional and ordered its immediate promulgation. After García continued to delay compliance, the Court issued an ultimatum on 15 January 2024, giving him fifteen business days to publish the decree. The ruling warned that continued noncompliance could result in his removal from office and criminal proceedings. García ultimately published the decree on 13 February 2024.

==== Decrees 340, 341, and 342 (2023–2024) ====
On 22 February 2023, the PRI-PAN bloc approved a package of constitutional reforms—Decrees 340, 341, and 342—with 28 votes in favor. Decree 340 modified more than twenty articles of the state Constitution, removing the governor’s veto power over the appointment of the Attorney General and granting Congress the authority to censure and remove members of the state cabinet. Decree 341 transferred control of the Public Defender’s Office from the Executive to the Judicial branch, while Decree 342 required the governor to obtain congressional authorization to leave the country for more than three consecutive days.

García refused to publish the decrees in the "Periódico Oficial del Estado" (lit. 'Official State Gazette'), arguing that they violated the separation of powers and infringed upon executive authority. After the publication deadline passed, the President of the Congress of Nuevo León, Mauro Guerra, announced that the legislature had published them in the "Gaceta Legislativa" (lit. 'Legislative Gazette') on 8 March 2023, declaring them in force. On 14 March, Judge Faustino Gutiérrez Pérez of the Eighth District Court in Tamaulipas granted García an injunction suspending the entry into force of Decree 340. In protest of the injunction, the Congress suspended all legislative activities from 15 to 21 March.

Separately, García filed constitutional controversy 262/2023 before the Supreme Court in March 2023, challenging the validity of the decrees' publication in the Legislative Gazette. On 22 June 2023, the Court denied García's request for a suspension, ruling that granting it would obstruct the legislative process and undermine a fundamental institution of the Mexican legal order, effectively ordering him to publish the decrees. Despite the Court’s order, García did not immediately comply.

On 23 October 2024, the Supreme Court ruled that the publication of the decrees in the Legislative Gazette was unconstitutional, holding that Congress had encroached on the exclusive authority of the Executive to publish laws in the Official State Gazette. The Court declared the 8 March 2023 publication of Decrees 340, 341, and 342 legally invalid and voided all actions taken under them. This decision annulled several appointments made pursuant to the reforms, including those of the Anti-Corruption Prosecutor, the Electoral Crimes Prosecutor, the State Auditor, and a member of the Judicial Council. The state government warned that individuals continuing to exercise authority under the invalidated decrees could face criminal charges for usurpation of functions.

=== Budgetary conflicts ===
==== 2023 budget ====
In late 2022, negotiations over the 2023 budget collapsed. The PRI-PAN bloc demanded significant increases in funding for the municipalities they controlled, as well as for the judicial and legislative branches. García refused, labeling the demands a form of political "blackmail" and an attempt to strip his administration of the resources needed to fund its flagship projects, such as the new Metro lines and water infrastructure. García missed the constitutional deadline on 20 November 2022; in response, on 27 December 2022, the PRI and PAN filed criminal complaints against García for abandonment of duty. On 1 January 2023, García bypassed the legislature, invoking "reconducción presupuestal" (lit. 'budget rollover'), a constitutional mechanism that allows the previous year's budget to continue when a new one is not approved.

Following negotiations, a deal was reached in early January. García presented the budget on 12 January 2023, 53 days after the constitutional deadline. As part of the agreement, the budget included a special fund of MX$2.5 billion for opposition-governed municipalities. In exchange, legislators agreed to return to committee various reforms they had previously approved, including municipal funding mechanisms.

==== 2024 budget ====
For the second consecutive year, García failed to present a complete budget package within the constitutional timeframe. In November 2023, he submitted only the "Ley de Ingresos" (lit. 'revenue law'), omitting the "Ley de Egresos" (lit. 'expenditure law'), which the Congress refused to consider as an incomplete package. On 1 January 2024, García again invoked budget rollover, applying the 2023 budget to 2024. However, García's administration omitted the MX$2.5 billion municipal fund that had benefited PRI-PAN municipalities in the 2023 agreement. The PRI-PAN bloc declared this illegal, asserting that only the Congress possessed constitutional authority to modify budget allocations.

==== 2025 budget ====
On 16 October 2024, the Congress issued a unanimous exhortation urging García to present the 2025 budget within 35 days, in accordance with Article 125 of the State Constitution. The exhortation underscored that two successive years without an approved budget had precipitated an institutional and economic crisis.

García delivered the 2025 proposal on 20 November 2024, meeting the constitutional deadline for the first time in three years. The most controversial component was a request for MX$17.56 billion in long-term borrowing to fund productive public investment, along with supplementary refinancing demands for state entities. When combined with refinancing and other debt requests, the total borrowing figure reached nearly MX$21 billion. Opposition legislators voiced strong criticism of the debt proposal. PAN deputy Myrna Grimaldo conditioned approval of the budget on the disbursement of MX$2.5 billion still owed to municipalities from the 2023 agreement, as they had yet to be distributed. PAN coordinator Carlos de la Fuente disclosed that the state was confronting a deficit of some MX$10 billion, owing to public works initiated without adequate budgetary planning and repeated failure to secure debt authorization in prior years. Morena coordinator Mario Soto signaled that his caucus might support short-duration borrowing of around MX$4 billion, but firmly opposed the full long-term debt package.

From late November through mid-December 2024, intensive negotiations unfolded. Congress convened joint working sessions on 27–28 November with mayors and autonomous agencies, many of whom decried the gap between their funding requests and the sums allocated by the executive. On 5 December, during a full legislative session, the budget proposal failed to obtain a majority and was returned to the Budget Committee. In response, García scaled back his debt request to between MX$5 billion and MX$7 billion.

With no accord reached by year’s end, Nuevo León entered 2025 under its second consecutive budget rollover, continuing to operate under the 2023 budget for a third year. Negotiations persisted through January and early February 2025. At the request of García, Secretary of the Interior Rosa Icela Rodríguez and Undersecretary César Yáñez Centeno mediated negotiations between the state government and opposition parties to achieve what federal authorities termed a "governability agreement". Following extended negotiations, García's administration and the PRI-PAN bloc reached a deal that enabled the approval of the 2025 state budget, which authorized approximately MX$8 billion in new debt for infrastructure projects. In return, the PRI-PAN-PRD bloc secured the payment of MX$1.757 billion in pending transfers to their municipalities and influence over several autonomous bodies. Ultimately, on 18 February 2025, Congress approved the 2025 fiscal package by unanimous vote in an early-morning marathon session that began at 12:20 AM.

== Gubernatorial succession crisis (October–December 2023) ==
In October 2023, García requested a six-month leave, effective 2 December, to run in the 2024 presidential election. He proposed that his Secretary of Government, Javier Navarro Velasco, be appointed as interim governor in his absence. While the Congress of Nuevo León approved his leave, they appointed Arturo Salinas Garza, the President of the Superior Court of Justice of Nuevo León, as interim governor. García contended the appointment was "illegal" and insisted that Navarro was meant to be the interim governor.

On 13 November, Supreme Court Justice Javier Laynez Potisek issued a ruling that provisionally annulled both appointments: Salinas's by the Congress and Navarro's attempted designation by García. The Court reasoned that Salinas's appointment violated the constitutional principle of separation of powers, as a sitting head of the judicial branch could not simultaneously hold an executive position. The SCJN ordered the Congress to appoint a new, legally eligible interim governor. On 29 November, the state congress convened to appoint Luis Enrique Orozco, the Deputy Attorney General, as interim governor. While the vote was underway, a group of citizens supporting García stormed the legislature, setting off a smoke bomb in the chamber. With the support of 25 out of the 42 state deputies, Orozco was named interim governor from 2 December 2023 to 2 June 2024. Just before midnight on 1 December, the SCJN issued a final, urgent ruling that validated Orozco's appointment and ordered that all state authorities allow him to take office to ensure "governability".

On 2 December, the day García's leave took effect, Orozco officially assumed the interim governorship. During a press conference shortly after assuming the interim governorship, Javier Navarro arrived and presented Orozco with a newly published decree from the official state gazette, which stated that García was withdrawing from the presidential race and officially reassuming his functions as governor. García contended that he retained the governorship as he did not use his leave, but the Congress asserted that the leave was already in effect, and a vote was required to revoke it.

As both García and Orozco claimed the governorship, Nuevo León entered a constitutional crisis pending resolution by either a legislative session or a ruling from the Supreme Court, with two individuals simultaneously asserting authority as governor. On 2 December, Orozco attempted to perform his duties as interim governor, but when he arrived at Fuerza Civil's Police Field No. 1 at 7:00 AM to conduct a troop review, no security personnel were present. Later that morning, when he convened a cabinet meeting at the Government Palace, no officials attended and the building remained locked. On 3 December, García held a public event inaugurating the reconstruction of a vehicular bridge in General Escobedo, where he was accompanied by his cabinet and recognized as governor by the Morena mayor Andrés Mijes, while Orozco separately met with mayors from the rural municipalities of Parás and Agualeguas in an effort to establish governmental relationships. The crisis was resolved on 4 December when Orozco resigned from the interim governorship, citing the need to ensure governability and avoid confusion, and the Congress subsequently confirmed García's reinstatement.

== Impeachment and removal proceedings ==
=== 2023 budget-related trial ===
The earliest impeachment effort grew out of the 2023 budget dispute. On 12 December 2022, PAN deputy Annia Gómez and the PRI's state leader, José Luis Garza Ochoa, asked the Congress to open an impeachment trial against García after he missed the 20 November 2022 deadline to submit the 2023 budget. On 31 January 2023, the Anti-Corruption Commission formally initiated the proceedings, citing both the late budget and his refusal to publish 56 decrees the legislature had approved, and summoned García to present his defence on 10 February 2023.

García challenged the trial in the courts. In February 2023 a federal district judge, acting on an injunction García had filed, granted a suspension that temporarily froze the trial, after he argued that the Congress had denied him adequate time and the evidence needed to prepare a defence. His government also filed constitutional controversies before the Supreme Court of Justice of the Nation (SCJN) disputing the trial's legality. In December 2023 the SCJN dismissed one of them, finding that it raised no genuine constitutional conflict.

On 21 May 2024, the SCJN ruled on the impeachment's constitutionality. It struck down as unconstitutional a portion of Article 203 of the state constitution that would have required an official facing an impeachment trial to be removed from office before any sentence, holding that the power to remove a governor belonged exclusively to the state's Superior Court of Justice, not the Congress. It nonetheless validated the Anti-Corruption Commission's decision to proceed, so the trial could continue while García remained in office. On 31 August 2024, acting on another controversy he had filed, numbered 249/2024, the SCJN granted a suspension barring the execution of any removal or disqualification arising from the trial until it could rule on the merits, while leaving the proceedings intact.

On 22 May 2025, the SCJN signalled that it would dismiss controversy 249/2024 as inadmissible, together with a related challenge, 253/2022, which concerned the parallel impeachment trial of Secretary of Government Javier Navarro Velasco. Such a dismissal would itself have validated the proceedings, so García withdrew both challenges; the court then directed him to formally ratify the withdrawal. The proceedings remained legally valid but stalled in the Congress, where advancing them to a sanction required the votes of 28 of the 42 deputies.

== Impact of the 2024 Nuevo León local elections ==
2024 Congress of Nuevo León election results

Election results by party

Election results by coalition

=== Results ===
The 2024 Congress of Nuevo León election produced a divided legislature. The Fuerza y Corazón por Nuevo León coalition—comprising the National Action Party (PAN), the Institutional Revolutionary Party (PRI), and the Party of the Democratic Revolution (PRD)—won 21 of 42 seats, falling one seat short of a simple majority. The Sigamos Haciendo Historia por Nuevo León coalition, made up of the National Regeneration Movement (Morena) and the Ecologist Green Party of Mexico (PVEM), and Citizens' Movement (MC) each secured ten seats, while the Labor Party (PT) obtained one.

=== Impact ===
The election brought an end to the PAN-PRI’s control over the legislative agenda. Neither the PRI-PAN-PRD coalition nor an informal MC-Morena-PT-PVEM bloc could reach the simple majority of 22 votes required to pass ordinary legislation, approve committee reports, or unilaterally control the legislative agenda. Both blocs also fell well short of the supermajority of 28 votes needed to amend the state constitution, ratify key appointments, or approve long-term public debt. Elected deputies and observers noted that the LXXVII Legislature would depend on negotiations and cross-party consensus to advance key priorities and resolve disputes over issues such as the budget, appointments, and pending legislation.
