= High-speed rail in Mexico =

As of 2022 there are two proposed plans for high-speed rail in Mexico: one connecting Mexico City and Querétaro and a second international line connecting Monterrey, Mexico, to San Antonio, Texas, United States. Both lines are in the early planning stages.

== Mexico City–Querétaro High-Speed Railway ==
Mexico City–Querétaro High-Speed Railway

Overview
- Native name: Tren de Alta Velocidad Ciudad de México - Santiago de Querétaro
- Termini: Mexico City; Querétaro City

Technical
- Line length: 210 km (130 mi)
- Track gauge: 1,435 mm (4 ft 8 1/2 in) standard gauge
- Operating speed: 300 kilometres per hour (190 mph) (proposed)

In 2014 tenders have been called for the build–operate–transfer of a high-speed rail line between Mexico City and Querétaro. This line would be 210 kilometres (130 mi) long, 16 kilometres (9.9 mi) on viaducts and 12 kilometres (7.5 mi) in tunnels, with a design speed of 300 km/h (190 mph). Expected completion date was by the end of 2017. It was intended to operate services hourly, with peak services every 20 minutes with an overall journey time of about 58 minutes. It was hoped to carry 23,000 passengers daily and remove 18,000 car journeys within the first year of operation. This will reduce a need to widen the existing highway to eight lanes, which also suffers from a poor safety record.

In November 2014 it was announced, that a consortium Railway Construction Corporation was selected as winner. Consortium consists of China Railway Construction Corporation, CSR, GIA, Prodemex, Teya, GHP infrastructure Mexicana and Systra. Including rolling stock and other railway equipment, the cost of the project is Mex$50.8 billions. However, a few days later, President Enrique Peña Nieto revoked the concession to this consortium, after evidence was found and broadcast, that corrupt acts led to having them selected as a winner (for example, the consortium giving a US$7 million house, located in a highly exclusive zone in Mexico City, as a present to the president's wife).

On January 30, 2015, the Mexican Secretary of Finance and Public Credit, Luis Videgaray Caso, announced federal budget cutbacks of 124 billion pesos (0.7% of GDP) in response to the impact on Mexican federal government revenues from the rapidly falling price of crude oil. One of the immediate consequences of these cutbacks is the "indefinite suspension" of work on the Mexico City–Querétaro High-Speed Railway.

In July 2018, President Andrés Manuel López Obrador revived plans to build the high-speed rail line as part of his transportation infrastructure plans.

On October 5, 2020, the Mexican Government approved funding of MX$51.3 billion (US$2.3 billion) to build the high speed railway. The line has been downgraded to medium-speed using the previously approved right of way to reduce environmental impacts. In 2022, President López Obrador announced the next administration would have to carry out its construction as his administration does not have sufficient time left to construct the line, along with several other infrastructure projects.

== Other projects ==
There is also a proposal for a cross border high-speed railway from Monterrey, Mexico, to San Antonio, Texas, United States. It is intended to avoid stopping at the border by hosting immigration and customs clearance at each terminal station prior to the trains departure. In July 2021, the then Governor-elect of Nuevo León Samuel García Sepúlveda, announced plans to potentially put the plan to work as Governor. By September 2021, the proposed railway received up to US$2 million to conduct a study on the rail service. Plans were later confirmed by Mexican officials with studies on the plan began in December 2021 by the Texas Department of Transportation while the Mexican government began their studies the following month. Studies are expected to conclude by the end of 2022.
