= Samuel Garcia =

Samuel Garcia may refer to:

- Samuel Garcia (footballer, born 1975), Tahitian footballer
- Samu García (born 1990), Spanish footballer
- Samuel García (politician) (born 1987), Governor of Nuevo León
- Samuel García (sprinter) (born 1991), Spanish athlete
