= Political crisis in Nuevo León =

The political crisis in Nuevo León since 2022 is a conflict originating from partisan political tensions, which led to the difficulty of establishing an interim governor in the Mexican state of Nuevo León after Samuel García's request for leave to separate from office and be able to compete in the 2024 Mexican federal elections.

== Background ==
The 2021 Nuevo León state elections were held on Sunday, June 6, 2021, and the offices of Governor of Nuevo León, 42 State Deputies, and 51 mayors were elected.

The governor-elect was from the Citizen Movement party, but they failed to obtain a simple majority in the Local Chamber. The opposition PRI and PAN parties did win majorities in Congress and in the local councils.

== Chronology ==
=== Initial tensions ===
Since 2022, political tensions have already existed in the entity, between the Executive and the Legislative and Judicial branches. This is due to constitutional controversies presented by the Executive, the process of appointing the prosecutor and the Legislative's refusal to approve changes to state budgets. The water crisis only further strained the situation.
