= Samuel García (politician) =

Mexican politician (born 1987)

Samuel García Sepúlveda
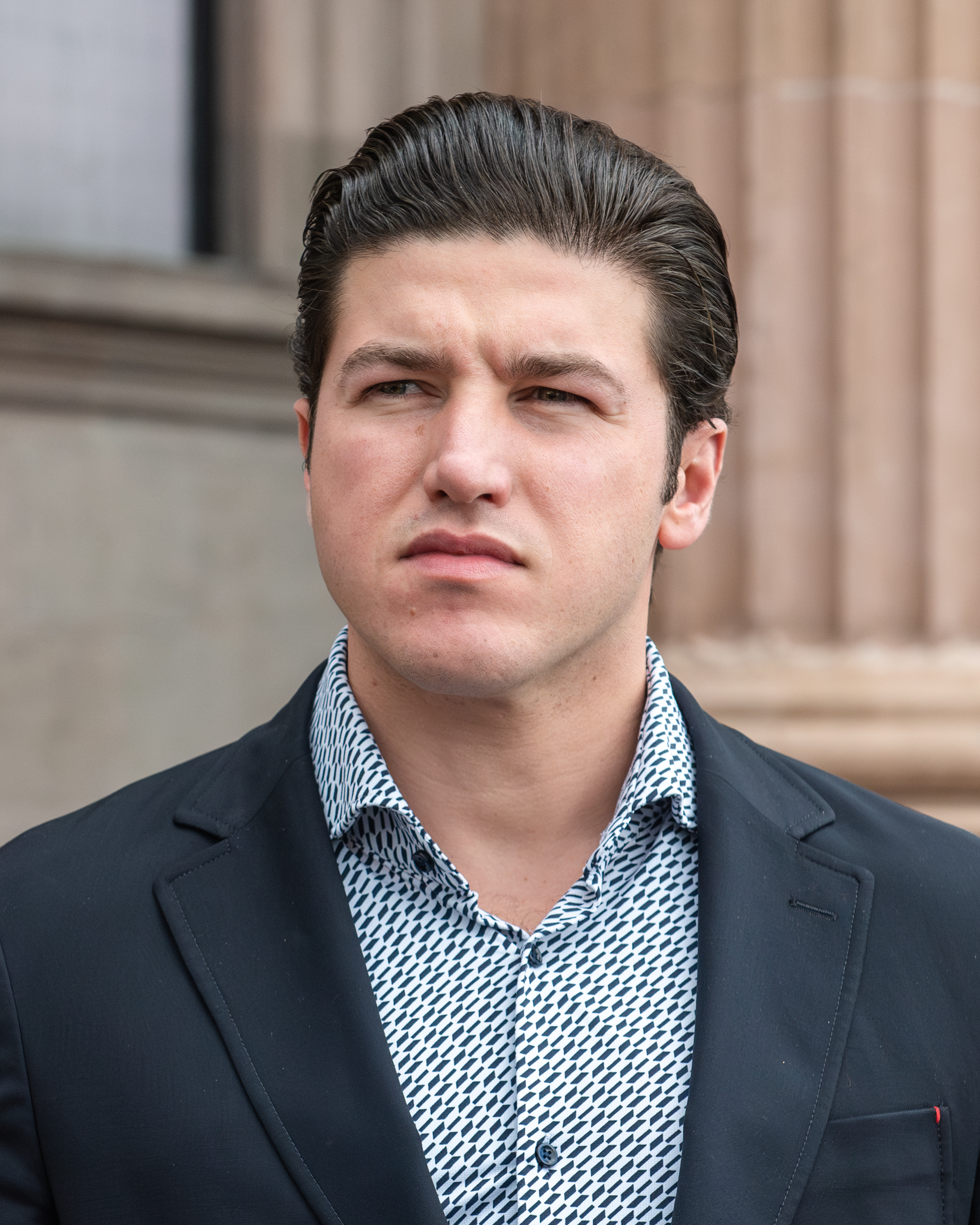
- García in 2022

Governor of Nuevo León
- Incumbent
- Assumed office 4 October 2021 (Note: From 2 to 4 December 2023, Luis Enrique Orozco briefly served as interim governor after García requested a leave of absence to run for president. However, García later contested the appointment, claiming he had not officially made use of the leave. On 4 December, the Congress of Nuevo León reinstated García as governor.)
- Preceded by: Jaime Rodríguez Calderón

Member of the Senate of the Republic
- In office 1 September 2018 – 18 November 2020
- Preceded by: Marcela Guerra Castillo
- Succeeded by: Luis David Ortiz Salinas
- Constituency: Nuevo León

Member of the Congress of Nuevo León
- In office 1 September 2015 – 31 August 2018
- Constituency: Proportional representation

Personal details
- Born: Samuel Alejandro García Sepúlveda; 28 December 1987 (age 38) Monterrey, Nuevo León, Mexico
- Party: Citizens' Movement
- Spouse: Mariana Rodríguez Cantú (m. 2020)
- Children: 3
- Education: Monterrey Institute of Technology and Higher Education (LLB, LLM, PhD); Autonomous University of Nuevo León (SJD); ITAC University (SJD)
- Occupation: Politician, lawyer, financier, writer, civil servant

Samuel Alejandro García Sepúlveda (born 28 December 1987) is a Mexican lawyer, politician and financier serving as the governor of Nuevo León since 2021. A member of the Citizens' Movement party, he served as a local deputy in the Congress of Nuevo León from 2015 to 2018 and represented Nuevo León in the Senate from 2018 to 2020.

Born in Monterrey, Nuevo León, García has an extensive academic background, holding three doctoral degrees: one in public policy and public administration from the Monterrey Institute of Technology and Higher Education (ITESM), in tax law from ITAC University, and in constitutional law and governance from the Autonomous University of Nuevo León (UANL). He has authored three books and taught tax law at UANL.

García was elected governor of Nuevo León in 2021, defeating the Institutional Revolutionary Party nominee, Adrián de la Garza, by 10.21%. As governor, he has focused on boosting foreign investment through nearshoring and expanding the state's infrastructure, particularly the Metrorrey network and highways. His tenure has also been marked by a prolonged political crisis with the Congress of Nuevo León, which briefly intensified in late 2023 when García briefly launched a presidential campaign that collapsed amid a dispute over the appointment of an interim governor.

== Early years and education ==
García was born on 28 December 1987 in Monterrey, Nuevo León to Samuel Orlando García Mascorro and Bertha Silvia Sepúlveda Andrade. His father was from Guardados de Abajo, Tamaulipas, who moved to Nuevo León to study law at the age of 14, eventually becoming a lawyer and prosecutor.

García is the eldest of three siblings: Silvia Catalina, Cecilia, and Roberto. He has an older half-brother, Samuel Orlando García Villarreal. He is related to Gilberto García Mena, a former high-ranking member of the Gulf Cartel known as "El June," who is his father's cousin.

García hosted a children's newscast on Canal 28 Nuevo León, a state-owned TV channel, where he conducted interviews and would conclude the program with readings on religious topics, taken from his mother's books.

=== Education ===
García completed his secondary education at Colegio San Patricio Monterrey from 1999 to 2002 and continued at Prepa Tec from 2002 to 2005. Following this, he enrolled at ITESM, obtaining a B.A. in law and finance in 2010, followed by a master's degree in public law in 2012. As a high school and undergraduate student at ITESM, he frequently participated as a speaker.

García obtained his first Ph.D. in public policy and public administration from ITESM in 2014. His dissertation, Fiscal Federalism in Mexico, received an honorable mention and was published as a book in 2016. Subsequently, he earned a second Ph.D. in tax law from ITAC University in 2019. In 2022, he achieved his third Ph.D. in constitutional law and governance from UANL. His dissertation, titled Local Constitutions in Mexico and the Realization of Federative Entities' Autonomy: A Special Focus on the Nuevo León Case, delves into how federalism in Mexico has been eroding due to the centralized system of national politics.

== Early political career ==
In 2014, García joined Rescatemos Nuevo León (lit. 'Let's Rescue Nuevo Léon'), an organization which allowed him to run for a local congressional seat through proportional representation.

=== Local deputy ===
Despite his loss to Marcelo Martínez Villarreal in the race for the 18th district seat during the 2015 Nuevo León state election, García successfully secured a congressional seat through proportional representation.

While he was a state deputy, he was named the parliamentary coordinator of Citizens' Movement in the Congress of Nuevo León. As part of his campaign, García pledged to donate his salary, a promise he fulfilled by donating to Un solo San Pedro (lit. 'One and only one San Pedro').

In 2017, he assumed provisional leadership of the Citizens' Movement party in the state of Nuevo León, succeeding Pilar Lozano Mac Donald. He held this position until 2 August 2019, when Agustín Basave Alanís was elected as the state's party leader.

== Senate of the Republic (2018–2020) ==
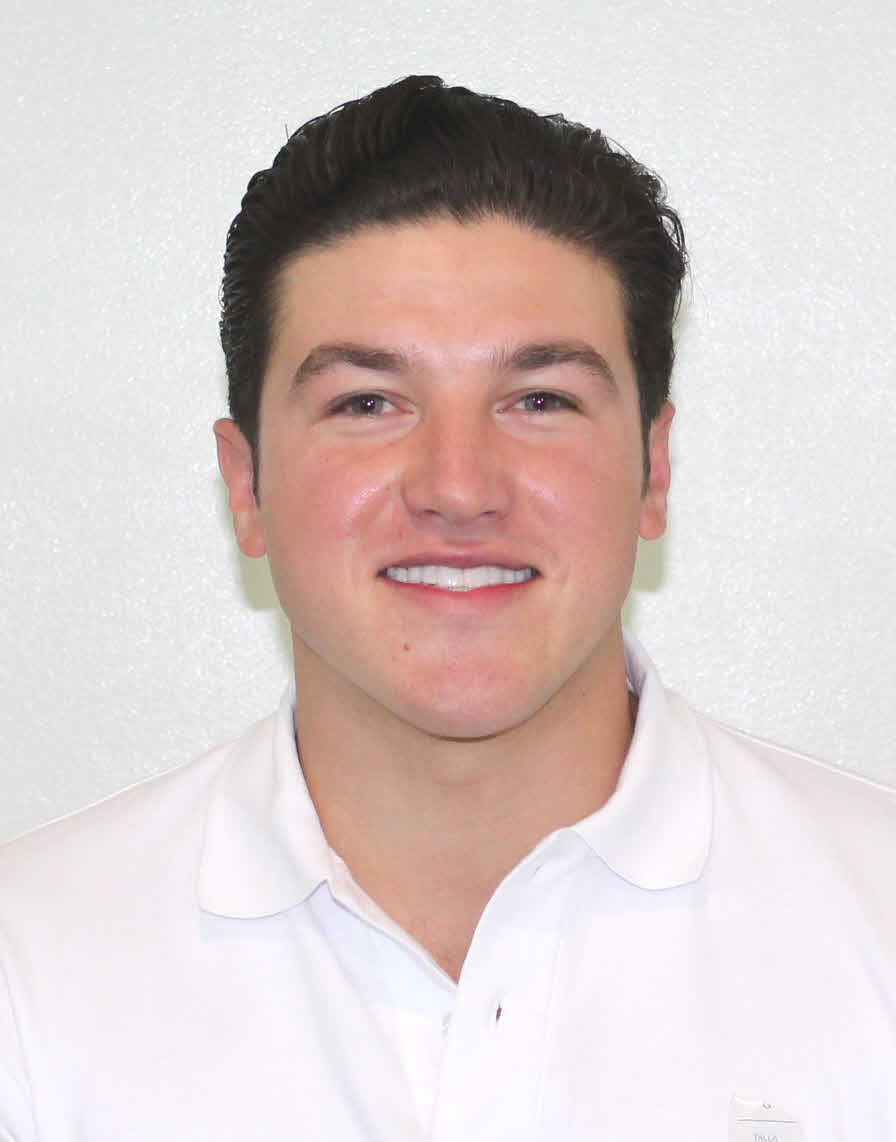
Senate portrait, 2019

=== Election ===
In the 2018 Mexican general election, Samuel García and Indira Kempis Martínez were nominated by Citizens' Movement to represent Nuevo León in the Senate, with García occupying the first place on the party's two-name formula. They were successfully elected, obtaining 24.21% of the vote, beating the National Action Party's candidates, Víctor Oswaldo Fuentes Solís and Alejandra Maria Sada Alanis, by only 15,131 votes.

=== Tenure ===
At the age of 30, García became one of the youngest senators of the 64th Legislature, only being surpassed by Raúl Bolaños Cacho Cué of the Green Ecologist Party of Mexico (PVEM) at 30 years old, and by Citlalli Hernández and Claudia Balderas Espinoza of MORENA, who were 28 and 26 years old respectively.

In October 2018, he travelled to The Hague as part of the Mexican Senate's appeal against the former governor of Veracruz, Javier Duarte de Ochoa, on charges of crimes against humanity before the International Criminal Court. The Mexican Senate accused Duarte of orchestrating the distribution of 70,000 counterfeit HIV tests and fraudulent treatments to children with cancer during his administration. In October 2019, he filed a report with the Anti-Corruption Prosecutor's Office of the Attorney General's Office (FGR) against the then governor of Nuevo León, Jaime Rodríguez Calderón, alleging crimes such as money laundering and misappropriation of resources. He asserted that he possessed substantial evidence, referencing four judgments from the Electoral Tribunal of the Federal Judiciary (TEPJF) that purportedly implicated Jaime Rodríguez Calderón in these illicit activities.

According to García, he was the second most productive senator, having introduced 370 bills and points of agreement, in addition to making 119 speeches in the chamber.

On 17 November 2020, he sought temporary leave from his senatorial seat to pursue the governorship of Nuevo León in the 2021 gubernatorial elections. During his absence, Luis David Ortiz Salinas assumed his role.

=== Commission assignments ===
For the LXIV Legislature of the Mexican Congress:

- Federalism and Municipal Development Commission (chairman)
- North American Foreign Affairs Commission (secretary)
- Commission for Monitoring the Implementation of T-MEC
- Commission of Legislative Studies
- Commission of Finance and Public Credit
- Jurisdictional Commission
- Justice Commission
- Commission for Youth and Sports
- Constitutional Points Commission

== 2021 gubernatorial campaign ==
=== Nomination ===
On 15 November 2020, Citizens' Movement announced that García and local deputy Luis Donaldo Colosio Riojas were seeking the party's gubernatorial nomination. On 25 January 2021, Colosio dropped out and declared his candidacy for the municipal president of Monterrey, leaving García as the only gubernatorial precandidate. On 18 February 2021, García's candidacy became officially registered with the State Electoral Commission (CEE).

=== Gubernatorial election ===
Election results by electoral district

On 5 March 2021, García kicked off his campaign at a conference where he unveiled proposals for a new tax agreement, a new vaccination plan funded with private investment, a new public transport system, a new infrastructure program, an intensified fight against corruption, and a new regional airport hub. He positioned himself as an incorruptible politician, emphasizing his lack of ties to the Institutional Revolutionary Party (PRI), and having donated his salary for six years. His campaign motto was Arrancar la vieja política de Nuevo León (lit. 'Tear off the old politics of Nuevo León').

García frequently attacked Adrián de la Garza (PRI) and Clara Luz Flores (MORENA), claiming that both candidates embodied "the old politics of the PRI". He used the video of Clara Luz Flores with NXIVM's Keith Raniere to further his point, questioning, "between Clara Luz and Adrián de la Garza, who of the two has the most criminal, evil, and perverse godfather? Which of the two has done and will do more damage to Nuevo León?".

2021 campaign logo

During his campaign, García faced criticism from his past comments which were perceived as "out of touch" with voters. These included him describing his childhood as challenging because his father forced him to play golf and by claiming people could live on a "small salary of $50,000 pesos", despite most Mexicans earning significantly less than $7,500 pesos per month.

García's campaign gained momentum through his wife's social media presence. Mariana Rodríguez Cantú, a well-known influencer with a following of over 1.7 million followers on Instagram, inadvertently viralized the campaign in a video where she showcased her orange sneakers and described them as, "Fosfo, fosfo", which was subsequently adopted as a slogan by García's campaign and the Citizens' Movement party.

On 6 June 2021, García was elected to a six-year term as the governor of Nuevo León with 36.71% of the vote, defeating six other candidates. He became the first Citizens' Movement candidate to be elected governor in Nuevo León.

== Governor of Nuevo León (2021–present) ==
García was sworn in as the governor of Nuevo León on October 4, 2021.

=== Economy ===
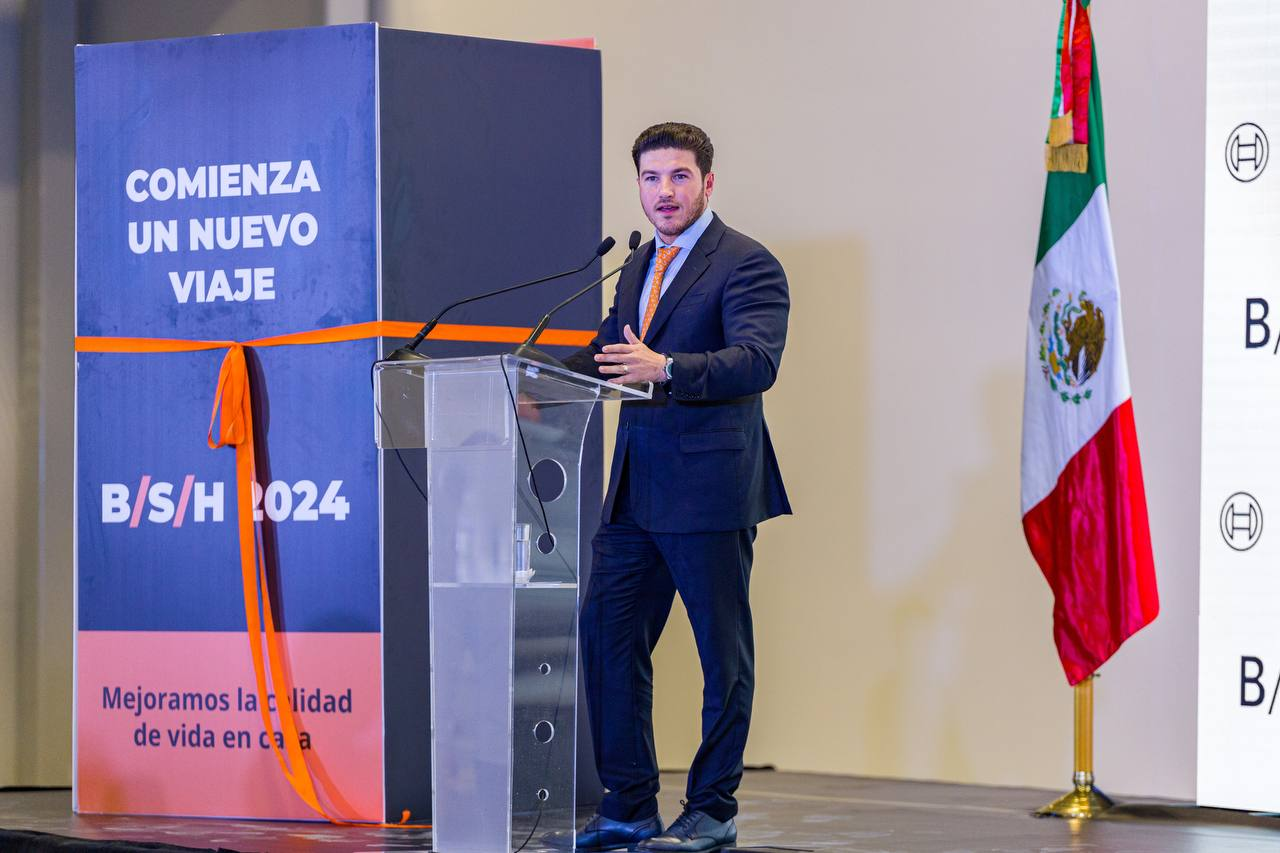
García speaking at the inauguration of Bosch's first appliance manufacturing plant in Mexico on 31 July 2024.

Taking advantage of industrial firms seeking to move their supply chains from China to Mexico, García spearheaded the nearshoring trend, with the governor frequently traveling abroad to negotiate with business leaders. Notable investors in the state include Bosch, Lego, Siemens, Volvo, LGMG, and John Deere. Tesla initially agreed to build a gigafactory in the state, but in July 2024, CEO Elon Musk said the company's plans are on pause due to Donald Trump's pledge to impose tariffs on cars made in Mexico. By mid-2025, the state had captured 76% of Mexico's nearshoring-derived foreign direct investment (FDI), with cumulative investments totaling $73 billion since García took office: it recorded $7.1 billion in FDI in 2022, $20.7 billion in 2023, and a record-breaking $33.7 billion in 2024.

García's tenure has been characterized by exceptional economic growth, with Nuevo León's economy expanding by 3.1% in the first half of 2024, more than double the national rate of 1.8%. Nuevo León's unemployment rate remained low throughout the administration, reaching a historic low of 2.68% at the end of 2023 before rising to 3.56% in mid-2024 and then declining again to 2.75% by early 2025. Over three years of government, more than 220,000 new jobs have been created, with the state responsible for 29.7% of new formal jobs in the manufacturing sector. Real wages grew 3.5% during this period. Exports reached $66.5 billion in 2024, growing 4.57% from the previous year, with 87% of exports destined for the United States.

García faced difficulties passing budgets throughout his term. In 2023, he submitted the budget 50 days late, and it was approved by the PAN-PRI controlled Congress of Nuevo León only after he agreed to include MX$2.5 billion for 28 PAN-PRI municipalities. For 2024, García implemented "reconducción presupuestal" (lit. 'budget rollover'), using the previous year's budget after failing to reach agreement with the Congress. As a consequence, many state and municipal projects faced delays or were stopped due to a lack of funding. In November 2024, García proposed the 2025 budget, initially requesting MX$17.5 billion in debt before lowering it to MX$5 billion following pushback, but it was ultimately rejected by the PAN-PRI-PRD opposition. A budget rollover was initially implemented, but negotiations between the executive and legislative branches resumed in early 2025, leading to a deal and the budget's approval on 18 February 2025.

=== Environment ===
García attended COP26, where he announced plans to introduce environmental taxes to fund a green initiative focused on reforestation. The 2022 state budget included four categories of environmental taxes: one targeting pollution from stone material extraction, and others addressing emissions into the atmosphere, water, and soil. However, environmental groups criticized the use of these taxes, calling for greater transparency regarding how the collected funds were being used by the administration.

In March 2023, García's administration launched the "Bosques Ciudadanos" initiative, which aimed to plant one million trees by the end of his tenure. By September 2024, about 512,000 trees had been planted, with about 70,000 of them planted in urban areas.

In 2024, PM2.5 levels in the Monterrey metropolitan area reached their highest since 2020. García's administration attributed the pollution to the Cadereyta refinery and temporarily shut it down in March after personnel refused to allow access for an inspection ordered by a federal judge. In 2025, the administration began issuing air quality forecasts, while García attributed pollution mainly to vehicle emissions and poor-quality gasoline. He also criticized weather apps for allegedly misreporting air quality, claiming they confused cloud cover and dust with pollution. Critics faulted his administration for not taking action against some heavily polluting manufacturers.

García faced criticism for the deforestation of parts of the Santa Catarina River, which he defended as a preventive measure against potential hurricane-induced flooding; the project was halted due to opposition. In 2025, the administration's proposal to construct a second level of the Morones Prieto avenue, which runs parallel to the river, was withdrawn after facing similar resistance from environmental groups. García later designated the river as a Protected Natural Area, ordering the conservation of local flora and fauna, protection of endangered species, and prohibition of new construction within the protected zone.

=== Infrastructure ===
==== Roads and highways ====
García proposed his Master Road Plan, which aimed to enhance state connectivity and facilitate direct access to the Laredo–Colombia Solidarity International Bridge. Key projects included the phased reconstruction of Uno Norte highway, the completion of the Gloria-Columbia highway, and a 45-kilometer extension of the Periférico highway. In 2024, the Interserrana Highway, designed to link Mexican Federal Highways 85 and 57, was presented to President-elect Claudia Sheinbaum, who agreed to elevate the project to the federal level.

==== Water ====
García continued the construction of Liberty dam started by his predecessor in early 2020, which was 25% complete by García's inauguration in October 2021. In July 2023, García closed the dam's gates, and by April 2024, began extracting water for use in the Monterrey metropolitan area.

In 2023, García proposed the El Cuchillo II aqueduct, funded publicly and privately at MX$12.24 billion, in order to transport more water from the El Cuchillo reservoir to the Monterrey metropolitan area. In late 2023, García and Andrés Manuel López Obrador inaugurated the aqueduct in two phases, with a capacity to transport up to 5,000 liters per second.

=== Public transportation ===
==== Metrorrey ====
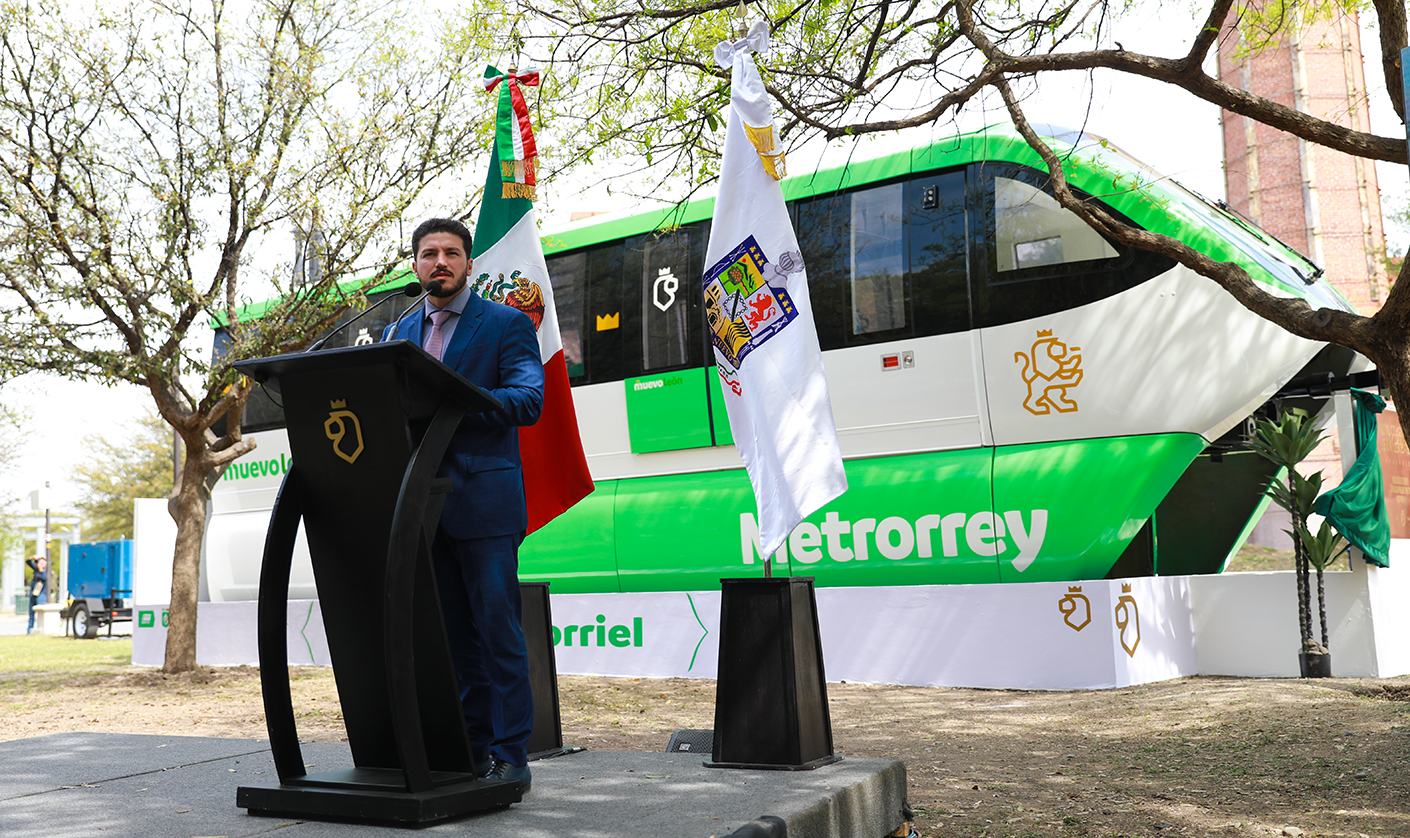
García unveiling the monorail train model for Lines 4 and 6 in February 2024.

García's administration launched a significant expansion of the Metrorrey network with the planning of three new monorail lines: 4, 5, and 6, all designed to run on elevated viaducts. Construction for Lines 4 and 6 began in early 2023. Line 5 faced considerable opposition from residents in southern Monterrey who advocated for an underground system, leading to its redesign as an Autonomous Rail Rapid Transit (ART) line before being ultimately cancelled in November 2024.

Investment was also directed toward the system's existing infrastructure. The elevated section of Line 2 underwent major reconstruction to correct structural flaws in its support columns and beams. Additionally, plans were announced to renovate the Talleres, Exposición, and Y Griega metro stations, and twenty-two new rail cars were purchased to replace the oldest rolling stock on Line 1.

==== Bus network ====
García's administration inherited a bus system in a state of collapse. The operational fleet had diminished significantly from 2015 levels due to fare freezes, dropping from approximately 4,550 buses to around 2,700 units by the time García took office. The fleet shortage caused wait times that sometimes exceeded an hour, and the remaining buses were largely aged and in poor condition.

To address this crisis, the administration reasserted state control over the network, replacing the concession-based model with a payment-per-kilometer system to guarantee service across all routes. The government also undertook a comprehensive reorganization of the route network into geographical "cuencas" (lit. 'basins') defined by main streets and geographical features such as mountains and rivers. This restructuring aimed to prevent routes from competing with each other, establish trunk routes as feeders to avoid congesting the city center, and optimize service coverage. A large-scale fleet renewal was also launched with a goal of acquiring 4,000 new low-emission, natural gas, and electric buses. By the end of 2023, more than 1,500 of these new units were in operation; by October 2025, the full 4,000 buses had been acquired, including 400 electric TransMetro feeder buses serving 30 routes to connect neighborhoods with Metro stations. The new buses, many manufactured at the Volvo-Marcopolo plant in Nuevo León, featured air conditioning, WiFi, security cameras connected to the C5 command center, panic buttons, and accessibility features for people with disabilities.

The implementation faced significant challenges, however, as contracted companies repeatedly failed to meet delivery deadlines. By July 2022, only 30 of 800 buses from the TICSA consortium had arrived despite contractual obligations for 520 units, while early deliveries also lacked adequate natural gas refueling infrastructure. Additionally, the restructuring process has been criticized for lack of transparency, with uncertainty about how routes were being reorganized and how many buses were actually in circulation.

==== Fares ====
The administration standardized the payment system across both the metro and the bus network, phasing out magnetic paper tickets and single-use cash payments in favor of the rechargeable NFC cards and QR code technology. In 2022, the fare for a single journey on Metrorrey was increased from MX$4.50 to MX$5.50, followed by a programmed gradual increase of MX$0.10 per month, with the goal of reaching a fare of MX$9 in 2025. In January 2025, the administration approved another fare increase for urban buses from MX$15 to MX$17 through monthly increments of MX$0.10 until August 2026. The fare hike, dubbed the "tarifazo" by critics, sparked protests and symbolic government building closures.

=== Social issues ===
In June 2023, García published a bill that codified same-sex marriage, making Nuevo León the final state in Mexico to codify it.

While drafting the new state constitution, García recommended that state deputies include a provision recognizing life from conception. However, this suggestion was ultimately not incorporated into the final version of the constitution.

=== U.S. Border ===
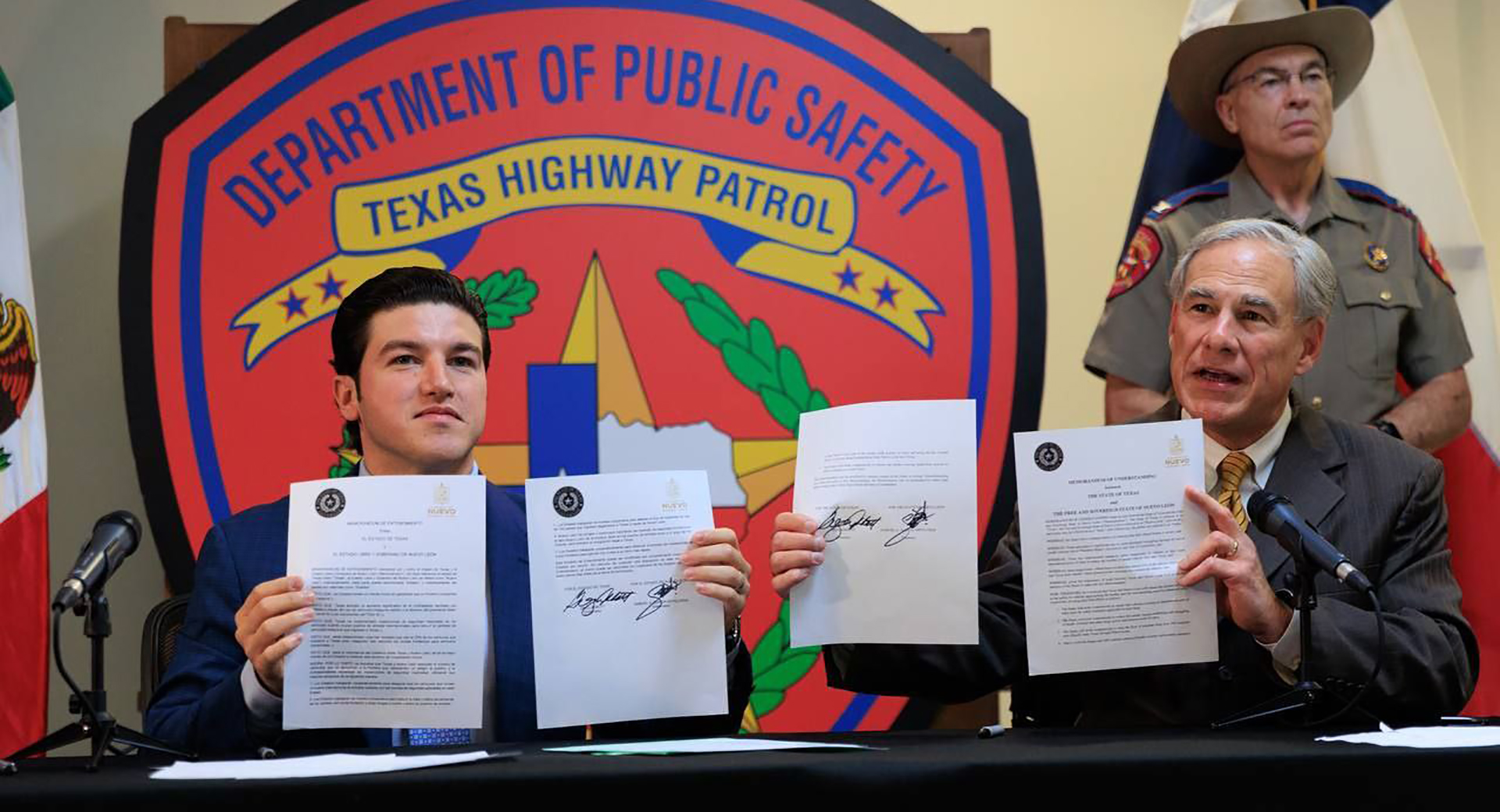
García and Texas Governor Greg Abbott signing border agreement on 13 April 2022.

In early April 2022, Texas Governor Greg Abbott announced heightened inspections of commercial trucks entering from Mexico, causing significant traffic delays at the border. García met with Abbott and signed an agreement, committing to increasing security and establishing checkpoints on the Nuevo León side, which halted inspections at the Laredo–Colombia Solidarity International Bridge. In September 2023, with guidance from U.S. Customs and Border Protection, García inaugurated a new checkpoint at the border.

Recognizing the increased demand due to nearshoring, García initiated plans to expand the Laredo–Colombia Solidarity International Bridge to accommodate increased commercial traffic. In June 2025, U.S. President Donald Trump approved the expansion project, which included the construction of two additional four-lane bridges—doubling the existing capacity from eight to sixteen lanes.

=== Crisis management ===
==== Nuevo León water crisis ====
In March 2022, in response to the low water levels in Nuevo León's three main reservoirs, García's administration implemented the Agua para todos (lit. 'Water for everyone') water rationing program, which divided the Monterrey metropolitan area into seven zones, each with distinct water supply schedules. However, protests and blockades erupted in various parts of the metropolitan area, as demonstrators claimed that there was an unequal distribution of water, with some areas experiencing water shortages lasting several weeks.

García started cloud seeding with silver iodide in order to increase the chances of rainfall over the state's main reservoirs. Between June 2022 and December 2023, 161 flights were conducted at a cost of MX$135 million. Some commentators labeled the effort ineffective and a waste of taxpayer money, pointing out that on some days, there was little to no rainfall after the cloud seeding.

García often expressed dissatisfaction with social media criticism regarding the alleged mismanagement of water distribution, dismissing the situation and emphasizing that water supply issues were beyond the scope of his gubernatorial responsibilities.

==== Tropical Storm Alberto ====
On 17 June 2024, García warned residents of an approaching tropical cyclone, urging caution for those near rivers and reservoirs and noting potential dam floodgate openings. He canceled classes from June 19 to 21 and moved the school year's end date up to 28 June. During the storm, García urged residents to stay home and issued an executive order on the night of 19 June suspending public transport and movement until the next day.

On 25 June, García declared a state of emergency for Nuevo León, estimating the damages at around MX$1.5 billion, primarily in Santiago and Cadereyta Jiménez. On 27 June, he met with President López Obrador and Rogelio Ramírez de la O to request reconstruction funds. Portions of Morones Prieto and Constitución, two avenues parallel to the Santa Catarina River, were closed due to erosion damage and were scheduled to reopen by the start of the next school year.

=== Tensions with the Congress of Nuevo León ===
From 2022 to 2025, Nuevo León entered a period of pronounced institutional gridlock and political conflict between García and the state legislature, which was controlled by the Institutional Revolutionary Party (PRI) and the National Action Party (PAN). The confrontation produced severe institutional consequences. Nuevo León operated for approximately 28 months without an appointed attorney general as García and the legislature disputed the selection process. In late 2023, the conflict escalated into a constitutional crisis when García, who had requested a leave to run for president in the 2024 Mexican general election, withdrew from the presidential race after disagreements with the legislature over the appointment of the interim governor, leading both García and interim governor Luis Enrique Orozco to briefly claim authority simultaneously until Orozco resigned on 4 December. Budget disputes also paralyzed state finances: García initially withheld the 2023 budget before reaching an agreement in January 2023, withheld the 2024 budget—forcing the state to operate under the rolled-over 2023 budget—and the 2025 budget was initially rejected by the opposition-controlled legislature before being approved in February 2025.

== Political positions ==
García claims that Mexico's federal funding favors southern states despite northern states, like Nuevo León, contributing more to the treasury, controversially stating that "in Mexico, in the north, we work, in the center, they administer, and in the south, they rest". According to García, Mexico allocates money based on population, deprivation, and poverty, whereas in the rest of the world, it is typically done based on efficiency, GDP, productivity, and foreign trade.

García has expressed that he is not opposed to the legalization of marijuana, and has also expressed support for same-sex marriage, stating that "legal precedent recognizes and affirms their right."

García has expressed his opposition to abortion, breaking with his party's stance. He explained that as a senator, he had to abstain from voting on matters related to the issue, acknowledging the Supreme Court's ruling but disagreeing with it personally. After the Court effectively legalized abortion in 2021, he reaffirmed his belief that life begins at conception.

He has criticized the political right, saying: "I believe that the political right or center-right seeks to achieve merit but at the expense of the most disadvantaged."

== Controversies ==
=== Doctoral Degree at ITAC University ===
In June 2020, he was accused of falsifying the documentation accrediting the Doctorate in Tax Law he obtained at ITAC University, a private educational center in the city of Monterrey. Samuel García had shared photographs of his postgraduate degree and a certificate of honorable mention on the social network Instagram, but several users later pointed out the inconsistency of the ITAC University rector's signatures on both documents and the similarity of one of these with the signature of the vice-rector of the same institution. In his defense, Samuel García published a video in which he argued that the discrepancy was presented by an unofficial document, that he had completed his doctorate in due time and form, and that the person who had signed this document was, in fact, the vice-rector, since the rector was on sick leave. Subsequently, local media Info7 reported that ITAC University had ceased to function and that its facilities were abandoned.

=== Male chauvinism ===
On August 9, 2020, Samuel García, during an Instagram Live told his wife Mariana Rodríguez: "Turn up the camera, you're showing too much leg. I married you for me, not for you to go around showing". Many women in protest uploaded photos showing their legs on Twitter using the hashtag #YoEnseñoLoQueQuiera. García later apologized and affirmed that it was only a macho joke.

== Personal life ==
García started dating social media influencer Mariana Rodríguez Cantú in 2015, and were married on 27 March 2020 at the Monterrey Cathedral. In May 2020, the couple announced that Rodríguez had experienced a miscarriage. They have three daughters.

García is a supporter of the Liga MX club Tigres UANL.

== Electoral history ==
2021 Nuevo León gubernatorial election
Candidate	Party	Votes	%
Samuel García Sepúlveda	Citizens' Movement	786,808	37.35
Adrián de la Garza	Todos por México (PRI–PRD)	598,052	28.39
Fernando Larrazábal	National Action Party	392,901	18.65
Clara Luz Flores	Juntos haremos historia por Nuevo León (MORENA–PT–PVEM–PNA)	300,588	14.27
Emilio Jacques Rivera	Force for Mexico	13,863	0.66
Carolina Garza Guerra	Solidarity Encounter Party	7,042	0.33
Daney Siller Tristán	Progressive Social Networks	6,629	0.31
Write-ins		702	0.03
Total		2,106,585	100.00
Valid votes		2,106,585	98.30
Invalid/blank votes		36,420	1.70
Total votes		2,143,005	100.00
Registered voters/turnout		2,143,005	100.00

== Publications ==
- — (2016). Federalismo fiscal en México: políticas para mejorar las finanzas públicas (Fiscal federalism in Mexico: policies to improve public finance). Editorial Porrúa.
- — (2018). La gran reforma hacendaría de los mexicanos (The great tax reform of the Mexicans). Procesos Editoriales Don José.
- — (2020). Nuevo León Frente a la pandemia (Nuevo León faced with the Pandemic).
