= Mariana Rodríguez =

Mexican model, social media influencer, psychologist and businesswoman (born 1995)

Head of Amar a Nuevo León
- Incumbent
- Assumed office 4 October 2021
- Governor: Samuel García Sepúlveda
- Preceded by: Office established

Personal details
- Born: 10 August 1995 (age 31) Monterrey, Mexico
- Party: Citizens' Movement
- Spouse: Samuel García Sepúlveda (m. 2020)
- Children: 3
- Education: Monterrey Institute of Technology and Higher Education (BA)
- Occupation: Businesswoman, model

Mariana Rodríguez Cantú (born 10 August 1995) is a Mexican businesswoman, influencer, model, and politician who is currently the Head of Amar a Nuevo León. She is the owner of the Mar Cosmetics brand.

Rodríguez received a bachelor's degree in organizational psychology from Monterrey Institute of Technology and Higher Education (ITESM), and in 2019, she founded Mar Cosmetics, a brand that specializes in makeup products. She became the First Lady of Nuevo León in 2021, following her husband's victory in the 2021 gubernatorial elections, as well as the Head of Amar a Nuevo León. In 2024, she ran for municipal president of Monterrey but did not succeed.

== Early years and education ==
Mariana Rodríguez Cantú was born on 10 August 1995 in Monterrey, Nuevo León to Jorge Gerardo Rodríguez Valdés and Luisa Cantú de Rodríguez. When she was nine, she worked as a ballet assistant, and at the age of fifteen, she began her career as a fashion model.

She is an alumna of Monterey Institute of Technology and Higher Education, where she received a bachelor's degree in organizational psychology, and is currently pursuing a master's degree in business.

== Career ==
Rodríguez began her influencer career in 2016 as a content creator on Snapchat and Instagram. By 2017, she transitioned to uploading makeup routines without speaking to the camera. Her viewers frequently asked about her techniques and the products she used, leading her to start recommending her favorite products. Rodríguez mentioned that she began receiving sponsorships after announcing her trip to Puerto Vallarta, where she started charging MXN $250 for a story, MXN $500 for four stories, and MXN $750 for a post. In 2017, she rapidly gained followers, and as of May 2024, she has approximately 3.7 million followers on Instagram, her primary platform.

On 4 October 2021, Rodríguez became the first lady of Nuevo León after her husband, Samuel García, was sworn in as governor of Nuevo León. She became a part of García's cabinet as the head of a new entity called Amar a Nuevo León, created with the intention of coordinating, planning, manage or execute special or priority programs in charge of the Public Administration, coordinate the advisory and technical support services required by the person holding the Executive Branch and, where appropriate, the municipalities, at their request; and to attend to matters related to the press, social communication and public relations of the State Government.

In late 2023, Rodríguez hinted at running for a popularly elected position, later stating that she was seeking Citizens' Movement's nomination for municipal president of Monterrey. On 6 March 2024, she officially registered her candidacy. She failed to win.

== Personal life ==
=== Family ===
Rodríguez is the eldest of three siblings: Jorge and Eugenia. She is a descendant of many prominent Mexican politicians: Viviano L. Villareal, governor of Nuevo León in 1879; Evaristo Madero Elizondo, governor of Coahuila in 1880; and Gustavo A. Madero, federal deputy (1912–1913) and brother of Mexican president Francisco I. Madero.

In 2015, she met the politician and lawyer-writer Samuel García in Puerto Vallarta, with whom she later had a romantic relationship until they formalized their courtship. The couple married on March 27, 2020, at the Metropolitan Cathedral of Monterrey. In April 2020, the couple announced they were expecting a baby; however, one month later, Rodríguez experienced a miscarriage. On March 10, 2023, their first daughter, Mariel, was born. On July 12th, 2025, their second daughter, Isabel, was born.
