= Adrián de la Garza =

Mexican politician

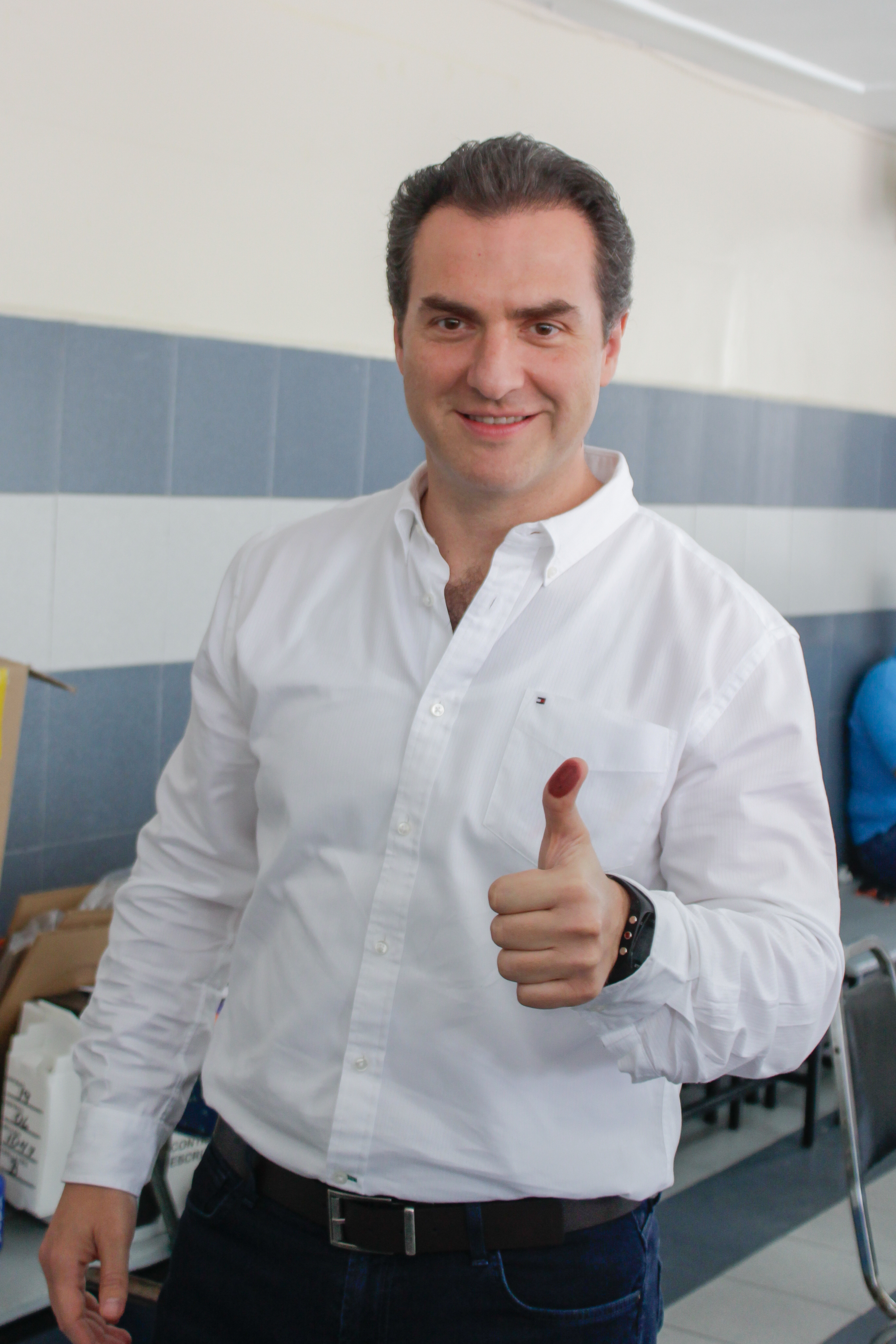

Municipal president of Monterrey
- Incumbent
- Assumed office 1 October 2024
- Preceded by: Betsabé Rocha Nieto (interim)
- In office 31 January 2019 – 2 March 2021
- Preceded by: Bernardo Jaime González Garza (interim)
- Succeeded by: Antonio Fernando Martínez Beltrán (interim)
- In office 31 October 2015 – 30 October 2018
- Preceded by: Margarita Arellanes Cervantes
- Succeeded by: Bernardo Jaime González Garza (interim)

Attorney General of Nuevo León
- In office 10 February 2011 – 24 January 2015
- Governor: Rodrigo Medina de la Cruz
- Preceded by: Alejandro Garza y Garza
- Succeeded by: Javier Flores Saldívar

Personal details
- Born: Adrián de la Garza Santos; 17 September 1971 (age 54) Monterrey, Nuevo León, Mexico
- Party: Institutional Revolutionary Party
- Education: Autonomous University of Nuevo León (LLB, LLM)
- Occupation: Politician; Lawyer

Adrián Emilio de la Garza Santos (born 17 September 1971) is a Mexican lawyer and politician of the Institutional Revolutionary Party (PRI) who has served as municipal president of Monterrey since 2024. He previously held the office from 2015 to 2018 and from 2019 to 2021, and was attorney general of Nuevo León from 2011 to 2015.

De la Garza spent two decades in the Nuevo León state justice apparatus before Governor Rodrigo Medina de la Cruz appointed him attorney general in February 2011. He held the post through the most violent years of the Mexican drug war in the state, directing the investigations into the 2011 Monterrey casino attack and the Cadereyta Jiménez massacre. He resigned in January 2015 to seek the PRI nomination for the Monterrey mayoralty, which he won that June, returning the party to control of the city after nine years of National Action Party government. His narrow defeat in the 2018 election was overturned through a five-month sequence of electoral challenges that ended in the annulment of the contest; he won the resulting special election in December 2018 and became the first municipal president of Monterrey to serve consecutive terms.

== Early life and education ==
De la Garza was born on 17 September 1971 in Monterrey, Nuevo León, to Filiberto de la Garza de la Garza and Sandra Santos. His father served as attorney general of Nuevo León from 1977 to 1979.

He studied law and social sciences at the Autonomous University of Nuevo León, where he also completed a master's degree in criminal sciences. He later took postgraduate diplomas in oral trials and in the development and administration of intelligence systems at the Monterrey Institute of Technology.

== Early legal career ==
De la Garza entered the Nuevo León state justice system in 1990 as political subdirector and general secretary to the head of the state Judicial Police. He subsequently worked as a qualifying judge and adviser to the legal subdirector of the state Directorate of Public Security, and as private secretary both to the attorney general and to the director general of public security.

Within the state Attorney General's Office he rose from an internship to head the Directorate of Preliminary Investigations in 2007 and the State Investigative Agency in 2010.

== Attorney general of Nuevo León (2011–2015) ==
=== Appointment ===
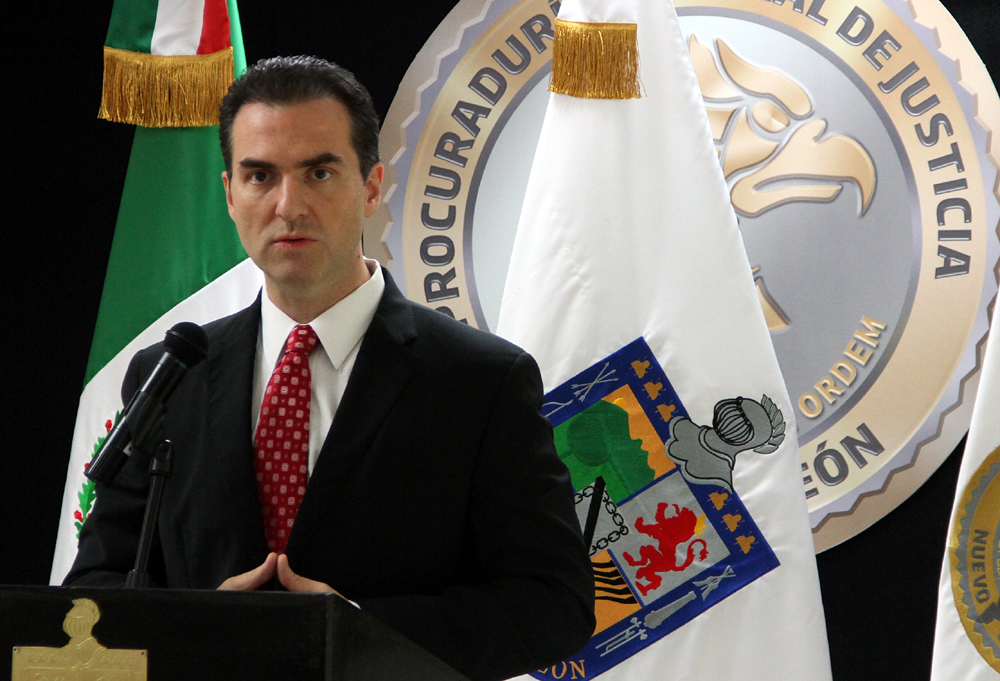
De la Garza as attorney general of Nuevo León in 2014

On 3 February 2011, Governor Rodrigo Medina de la Cruz nominated de la Garza as attorney general of Nuevo León. The Congress of Nuevo León confirmed the appointment unanimously seven days later. He took office during a period of heightened violence linked to organized crime, with Nuevo León among the states most affected by the Mexican drug war.

=== Reorganization of the prosecutor's office ===
De la Garza reorganized the state prosecutor's office into three regional branches—north, central and south—with the stated aim of decentralizing operations and shortening response times. He created specialized units, among them an immediate search unit for missing persons and a criminal investigation unit.

His office introduced the AMBER Alert system in the state for locating missing children, issued standardized uniforms for investigative agents and forensic personnel, and renovated the headquarters of the State Investigative Agency.

=== Organized crime cases ===
On 25 August 2011, gunmen set fire to the Casino Royale in Monterrey, killing 52 people. The state prosecutor's office under de la Garza announced the first arrests four days later. The five detainees said they belonged to Los Zetas and had intended to frighten the owners rather than cause mass casualties. Investigators drew on surveillance footage of the attackers' vehicles and on witness statements used to compose portraits of the suspects. The number of detainees grew to at least 17 over the following weeks and included Carlos Oliva Castillo, alias "La Rana", described as the organizer of the attack, and Baltazar Saucedo Estrada, alias "El Mataperros". No convictions for murder or arson were obtained in the decade following the attack, the cases having stalled in the federal courts.

On 19 February 2012, 44 inmates identified as members of the Gulf Cartel were killed and 30 prisoners belonging to Los Zetas escaped from the prison at Apodaca, the deadliest prison massacre in Mexico to that point. De la Garza announced that 29 prison officials and guards had been placed under arraigo, a form of pre-charge detention, over their part in, or failure to prevent, the killings and the escape, and said that staff under investigation had admitted taking money from Los Zetas.

On 13 May 2012, 49 dismembered bodies were found beside a highway near Cadereyta Jiménez, and de la Garza's office led the investigation. Identification was the principal obstacle for prosecutors, as the victims had been mutilated to impede it. Soldiers arrested Daniel Elizondo Ramírez, alias "El Loco", a regional Zetas leader, on 21 May; he told investigators he had organized and carried out the killings on the orders of the cartel's commanders.

=== Search for disappeared persons ===
The prosecutor's office held periodic working meetings with the relatives of disappeared people, convened with the human rights organization Ciudadanos en Apoyo a los Derechos Humanos (CADHAC) and the victims' group AMORES, at which prosecutors reported on individual investigations and relatives supplied information to direct them. De la Garza chaired the sessions. The first meetings were tense, but a working method developed in which volunteer lawyers reviewed the progress of each case with the public prosecutors beforehand, and the participants began drafting a search protocol to be triggered whenever a disappearance was reported.

In January 2015, the United Nations human rights office in Mexico commended CADHAC, AMORES and the prosecutor's office for their joint application of the protocol, at the presentation of a document systematizing the experience.

=== Torture and human rights complaints ===
Human rights bodies documented widespread torture by state police during de la Garza's tenure. The Nuevo León State Human Rights Commission (CEDHNL) confirmed 119 cases of torture by state officers, none of which resulted in an officer being criminally sanctioned, and recorded cases rose from 21 in 2012 to 44 in 2013. Between 2007 and 2015 the state's police forces drew more recommendations for torture than those of Tamaulipas, Michoacán, Guerrero, Veracruz, Chihuahua, Sinaloa, Baja California and Durango.

The prosecutor's office said it had records of only 16 complaints and had substantiated torture in none of them, and that officers had been disciplined administratively rather than prosecuted. Aristegui Noticias reported that the office did not open investigations on its own initiative when notified of cases, as required by Article 8 of the Inter-American Convention to Prevent and Punish Torture, and that the complaints the commission filed on the basis of its 119 documented cases were reported only as being in process. Most of the documented abuse was attributed to the State Investigative Agency, which de la Garza had headed in 2010 and 2011, and to which United Nations investigators were refused access. The report also said torture had been used to fabricate culprits in the Casino Royale case.

In 2024, Daniel Abdón Torres Muñiz, a former officer of the State Investigative Agency, publicly accused de la Garza of responsibility for his torture and enforced disappearance after he was seized in Apodaca in October 2011. Torres said he had been beaten, burned and had his fingers broken to extract a confession. The state had paid him more than two million pesos in compensation, and the victims' commission had recognized him as a victim of torture and enforced disappearance since 2016. A complaint lodged with the Federal Attorney General's Office later that month named de la Garza over the disappearance, the torture and its concealment, together with the then head of the State Investigative Agency.

=== Allegations of links to organized crime ===
In October 2016, a report by the Spanish National Police Corps named de la Garza among the political contacts of Juan Manuel Muñoz Luévano, alias "El Mono", during his tenure as attorney general. The finding was based on years of wiretapping of Muñoz Luévano. Muñoz Luévano had been arrested earlier that year over his alleged role in shipping cocaine to Europe for Los Zetas.

El País published an account of the police report in June 2017, quoting it as stating that Muñoz Luévano's dealings extended to "prosecutors and former prosecutors such as Homero Ramos, attorney general of Coahuila, Adrián de la Garza, attorney general of Nuevo León, or Torres Charles, former attorney general of Coahuila". According to the report, Muñoz Luévano had taken over the cartel's European operation from Madrid in July 2012 and moved some 2,100 kilograms of cocaine into Europe.

== Municipal president of Monterrey (2015–2021) ==
=== Elections ===
==== 2015 ====
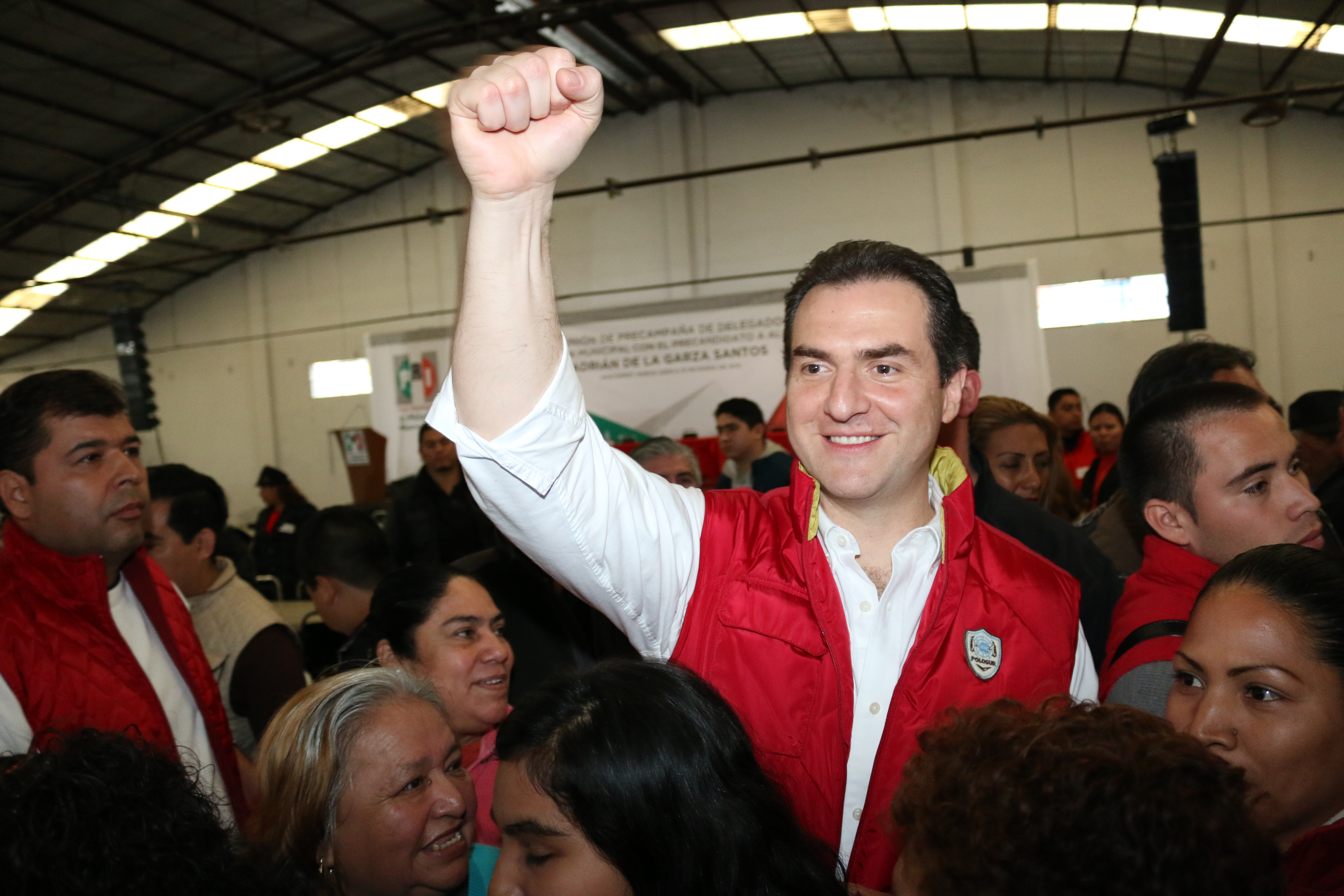
De la Garza at the start of his 2015 precampaign for municipal president of Monterrey

Candidate registration within the PRI opened on 15 January 2015. Senator Marcela Guerra, another aspirant, withdrew her precandidacy in his favor. De la Garza resigned as attorney general on 24 January and registered as a precandidate the following day. The State Electoral Commission approved his candidacy on 5 March for the Alianza por tu Seguridad coalition of the PRI, the Ecologist Green Party of Mexico, the New Alliance Party and the local Democratic Party.

In the election of 7 June 2015 he won 34.4 percent of the vote, against 26.5 percent for Iván Garza Téllez of the National Action Party (PAN). The result returned the PRI to the Monterrey mayoralty after nine years of PAN administrations.

==== 2018 and annulment ====
De la Garza announced in a video posted to social media in February 2018 that he would seek re-election. He lost the July election to Felipe de Jesús Cantú of the PAN by 4,679 votes.

He challenged the result before the Electoral Tribunal of Nuevo León, which annulled ballot boxes favoring the PAN and awarded him the office. The regional chamber of the Federal Electoral Tribunal overturned that ruling and declared Cantú the winner; on appeal, the tribunal's superior chamber annulled the election altogether and ordered a special election.

With the city left without an elected mayor pending the rerun, Governor Jaime Rodríguez Calderón announced on 2 November 2018 that the state government would assume command of the Monterrey municipal police to avoid a vacuum of authority. The measure was agreed with the interim municipal administration and declared to run for 60 days, renewable.

The special election was held on 23 December 2018. De la Garza won it with 41.22 percent of the vote on a turnout of 33.04 percent, down from 59.7 percent in July, and became the first municipal president of Monterrey to hold consecutive terms.

=== Tenure ===
==== Fiscal policy ====
The municipality carried debts of more than 3.8 billion pesos in bank loans and supplier obligations when de la Garza took office in 2015; his administration reported the figure at 1.97 billion pesos by the third quarter of 2020. The fact-checking outlet Verificado rated as misleading the claim that his government had paid off the debt it inherited, finding that the municipality had continued to contract new obligations. The municipal government renegotiated credit agreements, lowering interest rates from 0.79 to 0.50 percent on one facility and from 0.62 to 0.48 percent on another. Standard & Poor's raised the city's rating from "AA (stable)" to "AA (positive)" in February 2019, HR Ratings from "HR AA−" to "HR AA", and Moody's to "Ba1/A1.mx" in May 2018.

The administration modernized property tax collection and raised cadastral values. It applied reduced rates for widows, retirees, people with disabilities and single mothers. De la Garza reported in his annual addresses that property tax receipts rose by 71 percent between 2014 and 2018 and that own-source revenue accounted for 47 percent of municipal income.

==== Public works ====
In July 2018 the municipality was one of the participants in Colosal, a macromural painted across 290 houses on the Cerro de la Campana in the Colonia Independencia, covering some 25,000 square meters. The work, titled El ave de los sueños, was designed and executed by the civil association Colectivo Tomate from the residents' own accounts, and was backed by the Nuevo León state government, the municipality, the Monterrey Institute of Technology, Cemex and Comex.

The administration ran a neighborhood improvement program, Transformando Monterrey, which combined repainting of house facades with repairs to lighting, public services and shared spaces; a further edition was launched in January 2020.

In July 2020, de la Garza announced that the municipality would rebuild Avenida del Estado, in the Colonia Tecnológico, as a "complete street" designed for pedestrians and cyclists as well as vehicles. The work was undertaken with the Monterrey Institute of Technology under DistritoTec, an urban regeneration initiative the university had begun in 2014 covering 452 hectares and 24 neighborhoods around its campus.

==== Social programs ====
In October 2019, after several months of delay, the municipality began issuing the Tarjeta Rosa, a card that deposited 1,000 pesos every two months for women aged 18 to 64 in economic need. De la Garza described it as a campaign commitment and said the program also offered legal and psychological support, training and small-business credit. More than a thousand cards had been issued by the end of 2019.

==== COVID-19 pandemic ====
Monterrey suspended mass events on 13 March 2020 as the COVID-19 pandemic reached Nuevo León, and de la Garza declared an emergency across the municipality on 18 March in his capacity as president of its civil protection council. Cinemas, bars, casinos and cabarets were ordered shut.

Under a contingency plan running in two phases to the end of May, the municipality said it would distribute 200,000 food parcels, 200,000 cleaning kits and 300,000 containers of hand sanitizer, and would expand its social card programs to reach 40,000 families.

==== Public security ====
Between 2017 and 2020 the municipality added 780 vehicles to the police force, and built a police academy at a cost of 110 million pesos. Under the Sistema de Seguridad e Inteligencia it installed four thousand closed-circuit television cameras, the city's first such network.

Both programs drew scrutiny over procurement. A 2016 tender for sixty police motorcycles carried specifications that only Harley-Davidson dealers could meet, and El Norte reported that a local distributor had ordered the sixty machines before the tender was issued. In 2020 the administration bought two thousand further cameras without a tender from an existing supplier, justifying the purchase as continuity of the same equipment.

==== Next Energy contract ====
In March 2020, following a public tender, the municipality signed a 30-year contract with a consortium of Next Energy de México, Constructora Maíz Mier and Eólica Santa Catarina. The agreement, referenced at more than 7.3 billion pesos, provided for a solar park at Cerralvo and promised savings of up to 26 percent on the city's electricity consumption. The plant was never built. The municipality said that during the remainder of de la Garza's term it documented the first breaches, imposed penalties and recovered 174.5 million pesos without making payments to the supplier. The contract remained in dispute under the following administration and was rescinded during his third term.

== Between mayoralties (2021–2024) ==
=== 2021 gubernatorial campaign ===
De la Garza registered as a precandidate for the Institutional Revolutionary Party (PRI) nomination for governor of Nuevo León on 7 December 2020. The other aspirants included former federal economy secretary Ildefonso Guajardo Villarreal, the mayor of Guadalupe and former national party president Cristina Díaz Salazar, and the mayor of Apodaca, César Garza Villarreal; Díaz and Garza withdrew in his favor. On 24 February 2021, the PRI and the Party of the Democratic Revolution (PRD) confirmed the coalition Va Fuerte por Nuevo León with de la Garza as its candidate; the National Action Party (PAN), which had allied with them for that year's federal elections, chose to contest the governorship alone. He left the mayoralty on 2 March 2021 to campaign.

Election results by electoral district

De la Garza built his platform on three stated pillars: sound public finances, social stability and public security. Drawing on his record as attorney general and mayor, he proposed to modernize the state's C5 command and control center, recruit and train additional officers, and restore the state police force Fuerza Civil. On water supply, he proposed increasing extraction from the El Cuchillo reservoir from five to ten cubic meters per second. Following the #DebateMETA21 debate organized by Multimedios and Milenio, he said his proposals had been the most realistic of those put forward.

He distributed detachable cards at campaign events promising benefits to particular groups, including En Compañía for older people, Joven Fuerte for young people and a Mujer Fuerte card, known as the "tarjeta rosa", offering women 1,500 pesos every two weeks if he won. The card extended to the state the municipal program of the same name that he had launched in Monterrey in 2019. After President Andrés Manuel López Obrador displayed the cards at a press conference, the Federal Attorney General's Office (FGR) opened an investigation in May 2021 through its specialized electoral crimes unit. The FGR said the offer amounted to the buying and coercion of votes, and that using social programs for electoral ends was a criminal matter. The PRI maintained that the cards were lawful, and other candidates in the race had also distributed cards promising benefits. De la Garza said the investigation amounted to political persecution, and accused the FGR of harassing the cards' recipients. The state electoral tribunal fined him 35,848 pesos over the cards.

Both de la Garza and Samuel García of Citizens' Movement (MC) declared victory as polls closed on 6 June 2021. García took 36.6 percent of the vote to de la Garza's 27.9 percent, a margin of about 166,500 votes. De la Garza conceded the following day.

=== Candidacy for attorney general ===
In October 2022, de la Garza registered as a candidate for attorney general of Nuevo León, the office he had held from 2011 to 2015 and which had since been reconstituted as an autonomous prosecutor's office. The next month, the state government submitted an objection to his candidacy to the Congress of Nuevo León, arguing that Monterrey had become the country's most dangerous city for women during his mayoralty and alleging espionage, abuse of authority and the leaking of electoral material. The selection process then stalled for more than a year and a half, leaving the state without an appointed attorney general.

In July 2024, the Supreme Court of Mexico ordered the Congress to repeat the process, with de la Garza among the candidates to be considered. The Congress selected four finalists in August 2024, not including de la Garza, who by then had been elected municipal president of Monterrey, and appointed Javier Flores Saldívar to the post in February 2025.

== Municipal president of Monterrey (2024–present) ==
=== 2024 election ===
De la Garza was nominated in March 2024 for the Fuerza y Corazón por Nuevo León coalition of the Institutional Revolutionary Party (PRI), the National Action Party (PAN) and the Party of the Democratic Revolution (PRD). His principal opponent was Mariana Rodríguez, the wife of Governor Samuel García, standing for Citizens' Movement (MC).

In the election of 2 June 2024 he took 38.1 percent of the vote to Rodríguez's 30.5 percent, with Patricio Zambrano of the Partido VIDA third on 13.7 percent. The Electoral Tribunal of Nuevo León confirmed the result in August 2024, and the Federal Electoral Tribunal ratified it in September. He was sworn in on 29 September 2024 for a term running to 2027, his third as municipal president.

=== Tenure ===
==== Fiscal policy ====
In October 2024, the city council approved a 29 percent increase in cadastral values in a closed session.

==== Transport and public works ====
The administration announced a municipal bus service, Regio Ruta, in November 2024 and launched it in July 2025. The service carries registered residents without charge, using buses fitted with air conditioning, wireless internet, video surveillance and panic buttons; registration requires official identification and proof of residence in the municipality. The city put the annual cost at 200 million pesos and said the routes were intended for neighborhoods poorly served by existing transport. Two further routes were added in October 2025.

In December 2025, the municipality announced a rehabilitation of the Barrio Antiguo ahead of the 2026 FIFA World Cup, for which Monterrey is a host city, with a stated investment of 150 million pesos covering lighting, paving, removal of overhead cabling, street furniture and facade painting. De la Garza announced in January 2026 that Mina and Morelos streets would be pedestrianized, with retractable bollards admitting the vehicles of registered residents. The completed works, which also covered facades and public space in the adjoining Santa Lucía sector under conditions set by the bodies responsible for the historic center, were delivered in June 2026.

In March 2026, the city council approved the purchase of 61 houses in the Llave de Oro neighborhood, at a cost of up to 280 million pesos, so that they could be demolished to straighten Paseo de los Leones into a continuous avenue of three lanes in each direction. The houses stood on a traffic island long known in the city as the rotonda de las casas. Some residents objected that the sums offered would not buy a comparable property elsewhere in the metropolitan area; de la Garza said the purchases were being made at commercial rather than cadastral values, as determined by associations of appraisers and public brokers. The municipality had acquired 28 of the properties by the end of April 2026.

Other road and park works included the Circuito Vial Huajuco, a set of six projects budgeted at 650 million pesos, and a linear park in the median of Avenida No Reelección costing more than 24 million pesos. The Transformando Monterrey facade program of his earlier terms was revived on a larger scale, with a stated three-year target of two million square meters and more than 14,000 households. It painted some 1,700 houses in the Colonia Independencia by August 2025 and reached 3,000 across the city the following month. The municipality also replaced its mechanical parking meters with a virtual system paid through a mobile application.

==== Social programs ====
In April 2025, de la Garza announced the Tarjeta Regia Plus, a successor to the Tarjeta Rosa of his second term, which pays 2,000 pesos every two months to women aged 18 to 62 in situations of social vulnerability and provides legal advice, training and microcredit on which the municipality covers the interest.

==== Public security ====
The administration's security program, known as ESCUDO, combined recruitment and pay increases with expanded surveillance. The minimum monthly police salary was raised to 35,000 pesos, which the municipality said made the force the best paid in the country, and cadets were offered training stipends of 105,000 pesos. By September 2025, the city reported operating 6,795 cameras covering 1,475 locations.

The municipality attributed to the program falls of about 44 percent in homicides and 33 percent in property crime over its first year. INEGI's National Urban Public Security Survey recorded Monterrey among the cities with the largest improvement in perceived security over the same period.

==== Rescission of the Next Energy contract ====
The energy contract de la Garza's second administration had signed in March 2020 was still unresolved when he returned to office. Under his predecessor Luis Donaldo Colosio Riojas, the parties had signed a modification in 2024 that replaced the planned central plant with 1,397 solar micro-plants; certificates of progress worth more than 3.15 billion pesos were issued, committing the city to monthly payments of up to 49 million pesos.

De la Garza ordered an audit of the contract on taking office. In February 2026, he and Colosio publicly disputed responsibility for the agreement, each accusing the other of mismanagement, and the Nuevo León state prosecutor's office began coordinating with counterparts in Aguascalientes over the case.

The municipality concluded an administrative rescission of the contract on 11 May 2026, ending five years of litigation. It reported recovering 239 million pesos in debts, 32 million in energy discounts and 2.5 million in penalties, together with the site of the planned plant and about 6,000 installed panels, and put the net balance in the city's favor at more than 400 million pesos. Morena filed a complaint against de la Garza over the contract the following month.
