= Same-sex marriage in Nuevo León =

Same-sex marriage is legal in Nuevo León, following a ruling from the Supreme Court of Justice of the Nation, issued on 19 February 2019, that the state's ban on same-sex marriage violated the Constitution of Mexico. The ruling came into effect on 31 May 2019 upon publication in the Official Journal of the Federation. Under Mexican law, jurisprudential precedent is established when five rulings in a state reach the same conclusion on the same legal issue. Once this threshold is met, the precedent overrides conflicting provisions in state legislation. In the case of Nuevo León, almost twenty amparos were decided with the same outcome, yet the state did not act. On 19 February 2019, the Supreme Court issued a definitive ruling in an action of unconstitutionality, declaring the state's same-sex marriage ban unconstitutional, void and unenforceable.

Legislation codifying same-sex marriage into state law was passed by the Congress of Nuevo León on 14 June 2023. It was signed by Governor Samuel García, and went into effect on 25 June 2023.

== Legal history ==
=== Background ===
The Supreme Court of Justice of the Nation ruled on 12 June 2015 that state bans on same-sex marriage are unconstitutional nationwide. The court's ruling is considered a "jurisprudential thesis" and did not invalidate state laws, meaning that same-sex couples denied the right to marry would still have to seek individual amparos in court. The ruling standardized the procedures for judges and courts throughout Mexico to approve all applications for same-sex marriages and made the approval mandatory. Specifically, the court ruled that bans on same-sex marriage violate Articles 1 and 4 of the Constitution of Mexico. Article 1 of the Constitution states:

Any form of discrimination, based on ethnic or national origin, gender, age, disabilities, social status, medical conditions, religion, opinions, sexual orientation, marital status, or any other form, which violates the human dignity or seeks to annul or diminish the rights and freedoms of the people, is prohibited. (Note: Spanish: Queda prohibida toda discriminación motivada por origen étnico o nacional, el género, la edad, las discapacidades, la condición social, las condiciones de salud, la religión, las opiniones, las preferencias sexuales, el estado civil o cualquier otra que atente contra la dignidad humana y tenga por objeto anular o menoscabar los derechos y libertades de las personas.)

In September 2013, a federal judge ordered the civil registry to register the marriage of a lesbian couple from Monterrey. Governor Rodrigo Medina de la Cruz said his administration would abide by the order but only for this specific case. In June 2014, it was reported that nine amparos had been filed in the state, but only one had been resolved. Oral arguments were heard in court in September 2014 for a collective amparo filed by 50 gay and lesbian people contesting the constitutionality of articles 147 and 291bis of the Civil Code. Article 147 described marriage as "the lawful union of a man and a woman" and article 291bis similarly defined concubinage as "between a man and a woman". On 16 October 2014, the Supreme Court declared the two articles unconstitutional and gave the plaintiffs the right to marry their partners. The Supreme Court approved another collective amparo, involving 38 gays and lesbians, on 28 September 2016, and another, involving 118 people, on 19 October 2017. In addition, the court issued an amparo on 17 February 2016 ordering the state government to recognize the rights of cohabiting same-sex couples.

On 9 October 2018, the Supreme Court ruled that the Nuevo León Civil Code was unconstitutional and discriminatory in limiting marriage to different-sex couples. The court ordered the Congress of Nuevo León to change state law within 180 business days (i.e. by 16 April 2019). By that time, eighteen amparos had been approved in the state. However, the Supreme Court ruled in an action of unconstitutionality against the state on 19 February 2019, legalizing same-sex marriage in Nuevo León and mooting this case.

=== Early bills ===
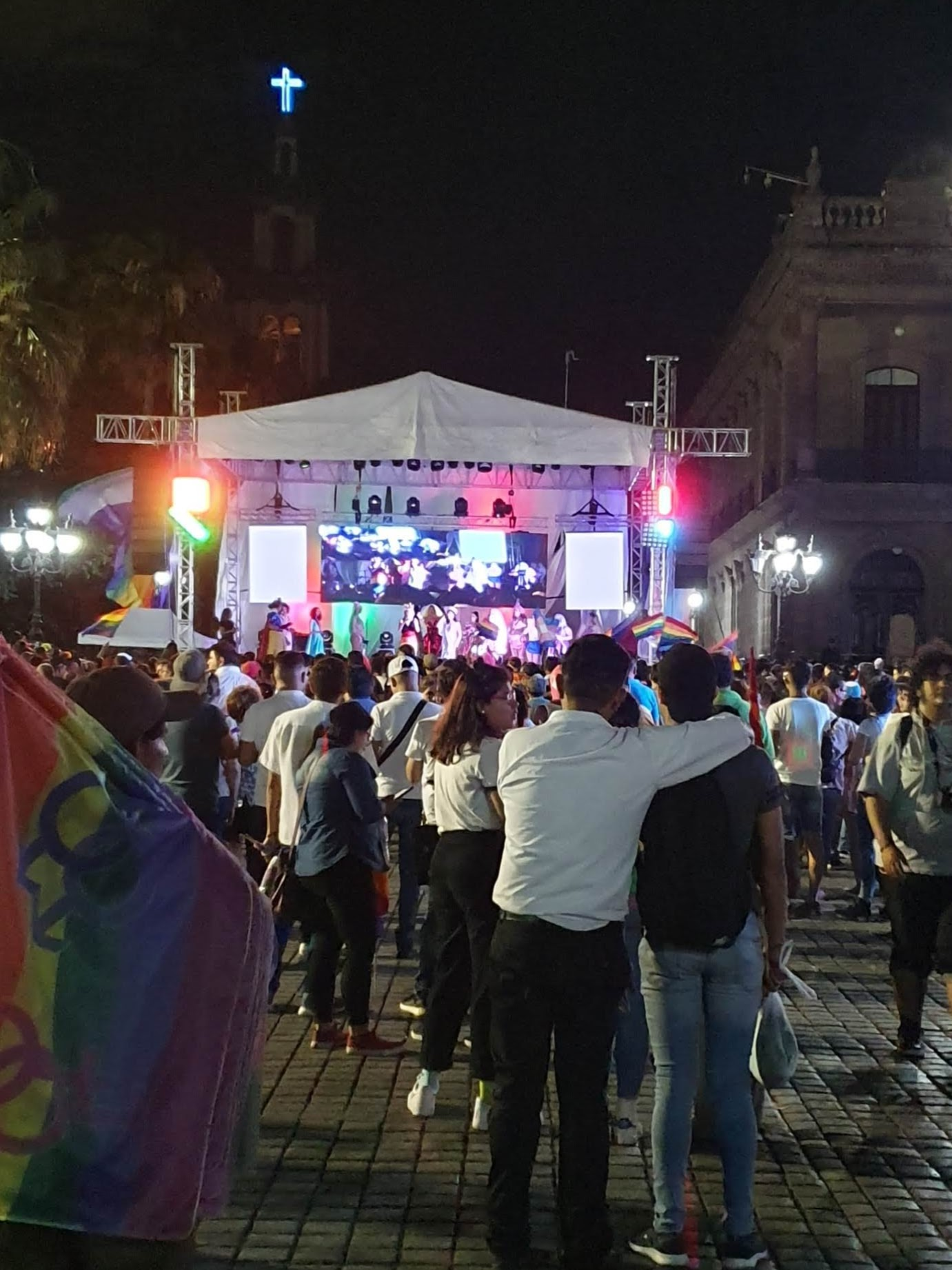
Participants at an LGBT pride event at the Macroplaza in Monterrey, calling among others for the codification of same-sex marriage into state law, June 2019

On 17 June 2015, the New Alliance Party announced its intention to introduce a same-sex marriage bill to the Congress of Nuevo León. The bill was presented on 22 June by Deputy María Leal Cantú. An independent congressman subsequently announced his intention to submit a civil union proposal with the support of the ruling National Action Party (PAN). Legislators announced that the marriage bill would be voted on sometime in September 2016, but this did not happen. In November 2017, after LGBT groups organized a protest march in favor of same-sex marriage in front of the Congress building, the state's PAN leader reiterated the party's opposition to same-sex marriage and announced it would continue to block debate on the marriage bill.

=== Action of unconstitutionality and passage of legislation ===
In February 2018, the National Human Rights Commission filed an action of unconstitutionality (acción de inconstitucionalidad; docketed 29/2018) against the state of Nuevo León, contesting the constitutionality of articles 140, 147 and 148 of the Civil Code. The Congress of Nuevo León had recently amended state family law, but left the same-sex marriage ban in place. Article 147 described marriage as "the lawful union of a man and a woman", and articles 140 and 148 required "the man and the woman" to be at least 18 years of age. This lawsuit sought to fully legalize same-sex marriage in Nuevo León, similarly to what had happened in Jalisco (2016), Chiapas (2017), and Puebla (2017). On 19 February 2019, the Supreme Court of Justice of the Nation ruled unanimously in a 10–0 vote that the articles of the Civil Code limiting marriage to opposite-sex couples were unconstitutional under Articles 1 and 4 of the Constitution of Mexico, legalizing same-sex marriage and adoption by same-sex couples in the state of Nuevo León. Governor Jaime Rodríguez Calderón expressed his personal opposition to the ruling, and religious groups opposed to same-sex marriage asked Rodríguez Calderón to "ignore" the ruling. Congress was officially notified of the ruling on 26 February. The judgment officially came into force on 31 May 2019 upon publication in the Official Journal of the Federation (Diario Oficial de la Federación). However, the civil registry began processing marriage applications from same-sex couples and issuing marriage licenses prior to the publication date, with the first same-sex couple to marry being Janeth Oliva Piñas and Amatzú Aranda Conchola on 11 March 2019 in San Nicolás de los Garza.

A bill amending state statutes to codify same-sex marriage into law passed Congress on 14 June 2023 in a 23–10 vote. It was signed into law by Governor Samuel García and published in the official gazette on 24 June. The measure went into effect the following day. Article 147 of the Civil Code was amended to read: Marriage is the lawful union of two people who remain faithful to each other and who create together a shared life with mutual support. (Note: Spanish: El matrimonio es la unión legítima de dos personas para guardarse fidelidad y crear entre ellos una comunidad de vida permanente y ayuda mutua.)

14 June 2023 vote in the Congress
Party	Voted for	Voted against	Abstained	Absent (Did not vote)
Institutional Revolutionary Party	10: Jesús Aguilar Hernández; Javier Caballero Gaona; Ricardo Canavati Hadjopulos; Lorena de la Garza Venecia; Elsa Escobedo Vázquez; Ana González González; Gabriela Govea López; Jessica Martínez Martínez; Heriberto Treviño Cantú; Alhinna Vargas García	–	4: Ivonne Álvarez García; Julio Cantú González; José Flores Elizondo; Perla Villarreal Valdez	–
National Action Party	5: Fernando Adame Doria; Carlos de la Fuente Flores; Antonio Elosua González; Gilberto Gómez Reyes; Amparo Olivares Castañeda	6: Itzel Castillo Almanza; Adriana Coronado Ramírez; Myrna Grimaldo Iracheta; Mauro Guerra Villarreal; Nancy Olguin Díaz; Félix Rocha Esquivel	3: Daniel González Garza; Eduardo Leal Buenfil; Luis Susarrey Flores	–
Citizens' Movement	5: Norma Benítez Rivera; Roberto Farías García; María Guidi Kawas; Sandra Pamanes Ortiz; Iraís Reyes de la Torre	4: María Gálvez Contreras; Eduardo Gaona Domínguez; Tabita Ortiz Hernández; Brenda Sánchez Castro	2: Héctor García García; Carlos Rodríguez Gómez	–
National Regeneration Movement	2: Waldo Fernández González; Anylu Hernández Sepúlveda	–	–	–
Ecologist Green Party of Mexico	1: Raúl Lozano Caballero	–	–	–
Total	23	10	9	0
Total	54.8%	23.8%	21.4%	0.0%

== Marriage statistics ==
The following table shows the number of same-sex marriages performed in Nuevo León since legalization in 2019 as reported by the National Institute of Statistics and Geography.

Number of marriages performed in Nuevo León
Year	Same-sex			Opposite-sex	Total	% same-sex
Year	Female	Male	Total	Opposite-sex	Total	% same-sex
2019	102	83	185	25,514	25,699	0.72%
2020	66	62	128	19,483	19,611	0.65%
2021	132	57	189	25,705	25,894	0.73%
2022	83	37	120	25,242	25,362	0.47%
2023	97	56	153	26,317	26,470	0.58%
2024	94	41	135	26,039	26,174	0.52%

== Public opinion ==
A 2017 opinion poll conducted by the Strategic Communication Office (Gabinete de Comunicación Estratégica) found that 48% of Nuevo León residents supported same-sex marriage, while 49% were opposed. According to a 2018 survey by the National Institute of Statistics and Geography, 44% of the Nuevo León public opposed same-sex marriage.

== See also ==
- Same-sex marriage in Mexico
- LGBT rights in Mexico
