= LGMG Group =

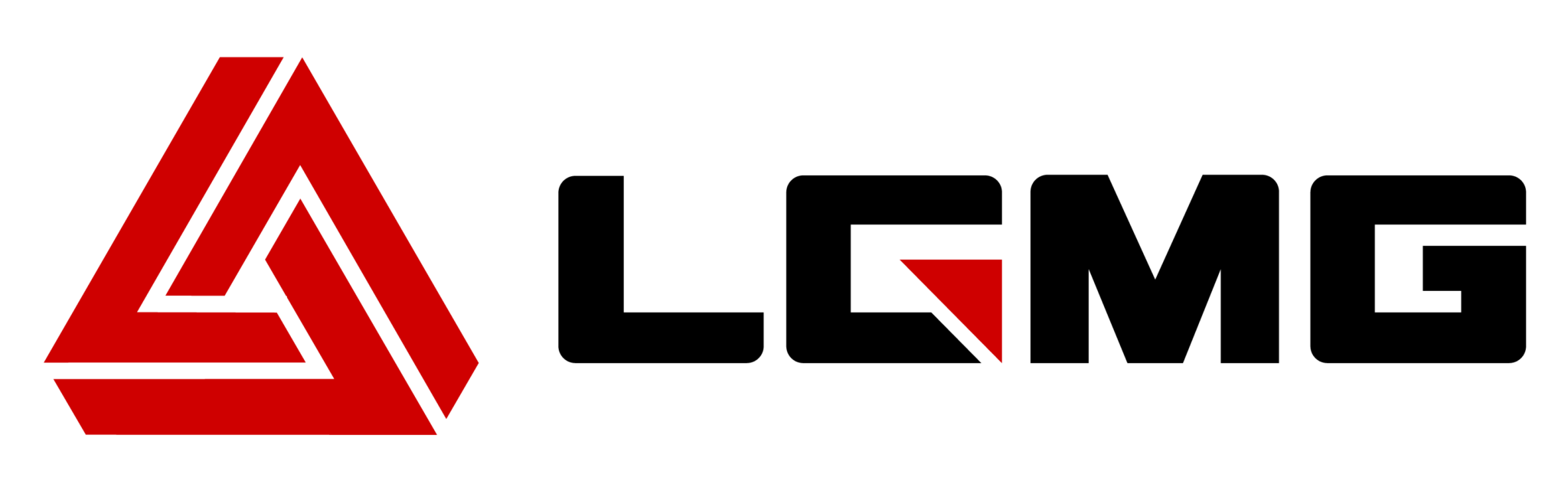

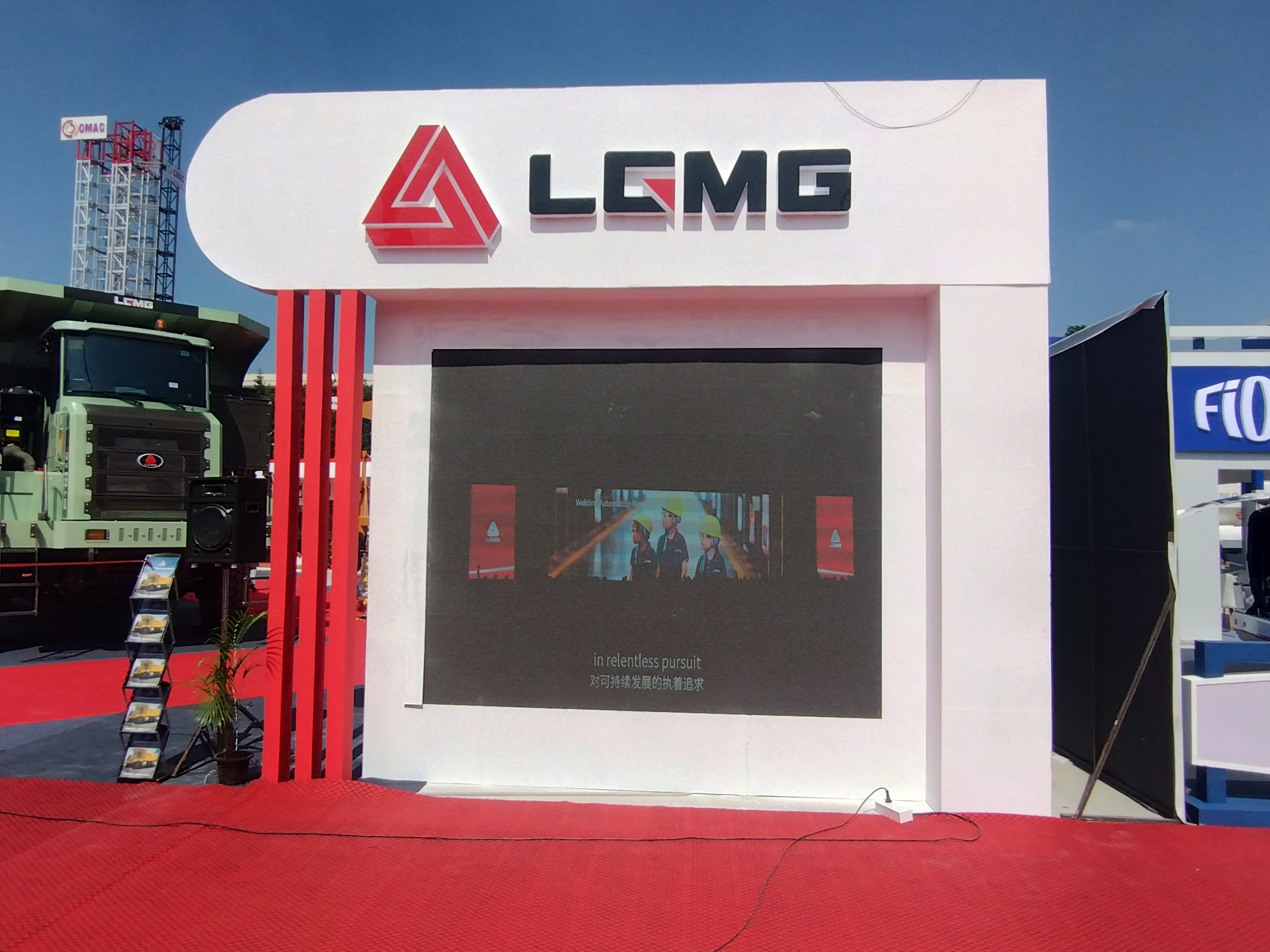
- LGMG at EXCON 2025, BIEC
- Industry: Construction machinery
- Founded: 1972 China
- Headquarters: China
- Area served: Worldwide
- Subsidiaries: Shandong Lingong Construction Machinery Co., Ltd. (SDLG); Lingong Group Jinan Heavy Machinery Co., Ltd (LGMG); Linyi Lingong Intelligence Information Technology Co., Ltd; Linyi Lingong Heavy Machinery Co., Ltd. and 18 other member companies
- Website: en.lgmggroup.com

LGMG Group (Linyi Lingong Machinery Group or Lingong Group) is a Chinese multinational construction machinery company.

== Company ==
The LGMG group is composed of four core companies, Shandong Lingong Construction Machinery Co., Ltd. (SDLG), Lingong Group Jinan Heavy Machinery Co., Ltd (LGMG), Linyi Lingong Intelligence Information Technology Co., Ltd and Linyi Lingong Heavy Machinery Co., Ltd. and 18 other member companies.

LGMG Group participated in EXCON and Bauma exhibitions.

== Media gallery ==
LGMG Group at EXCON 2025
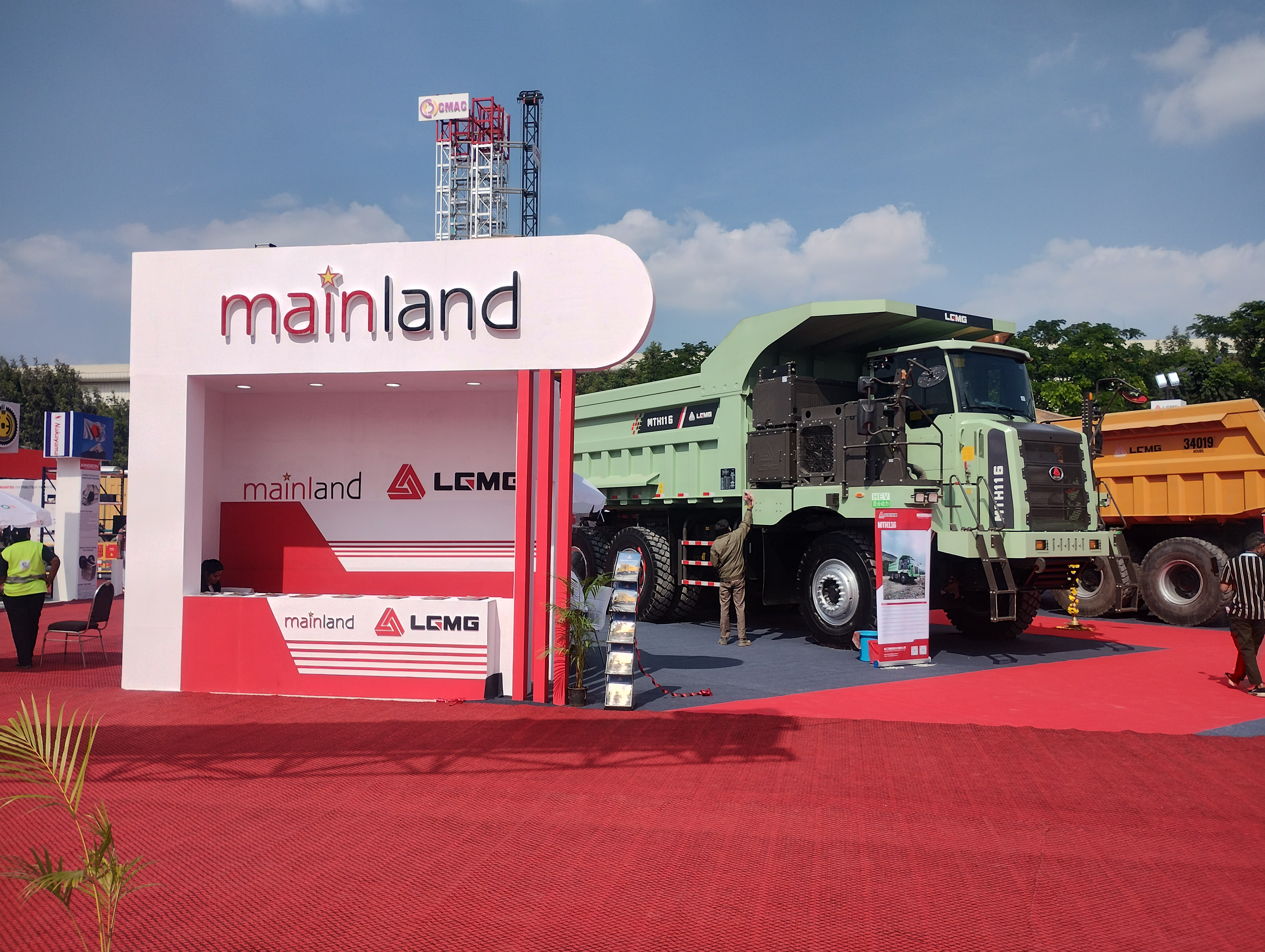

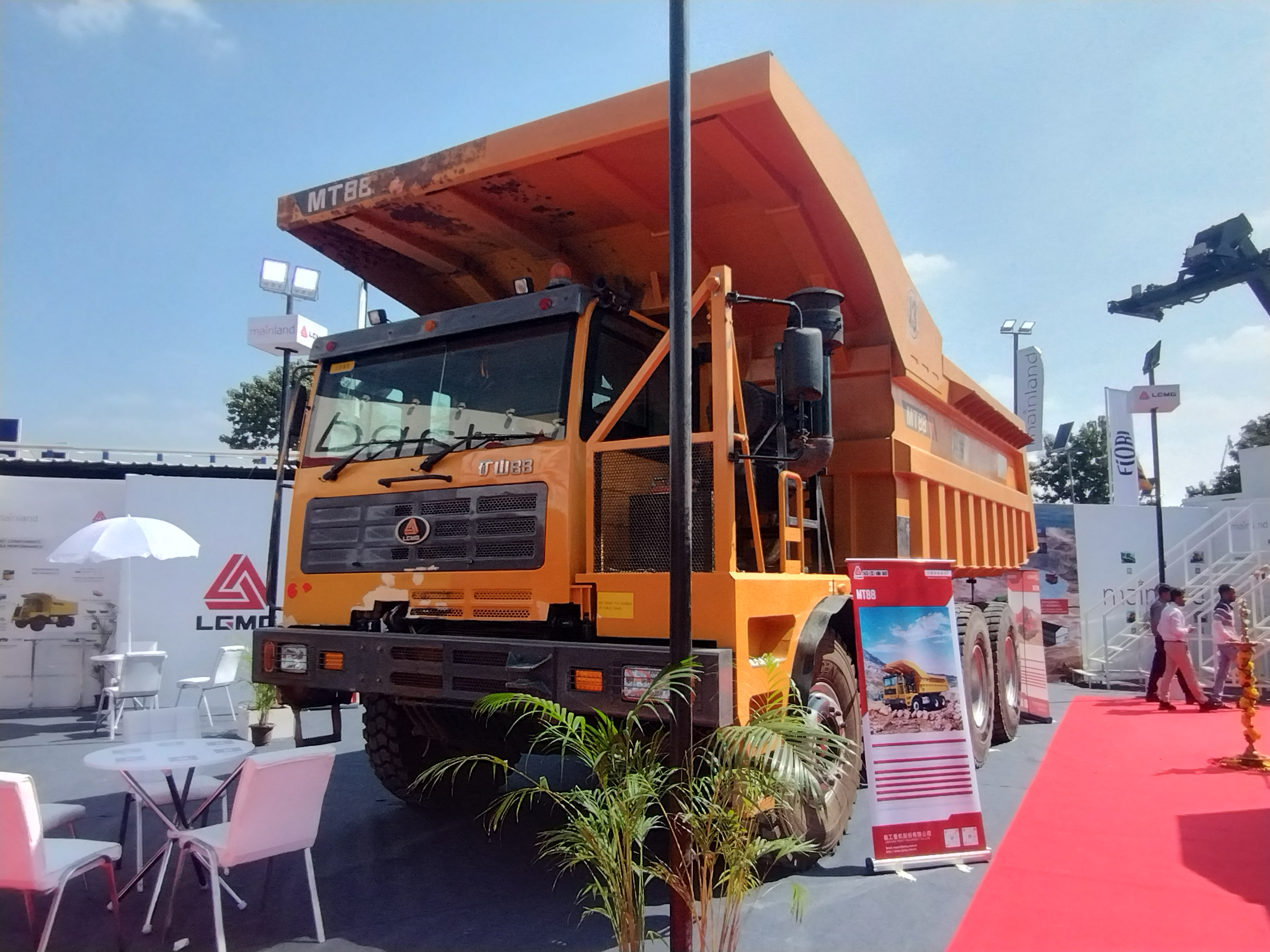

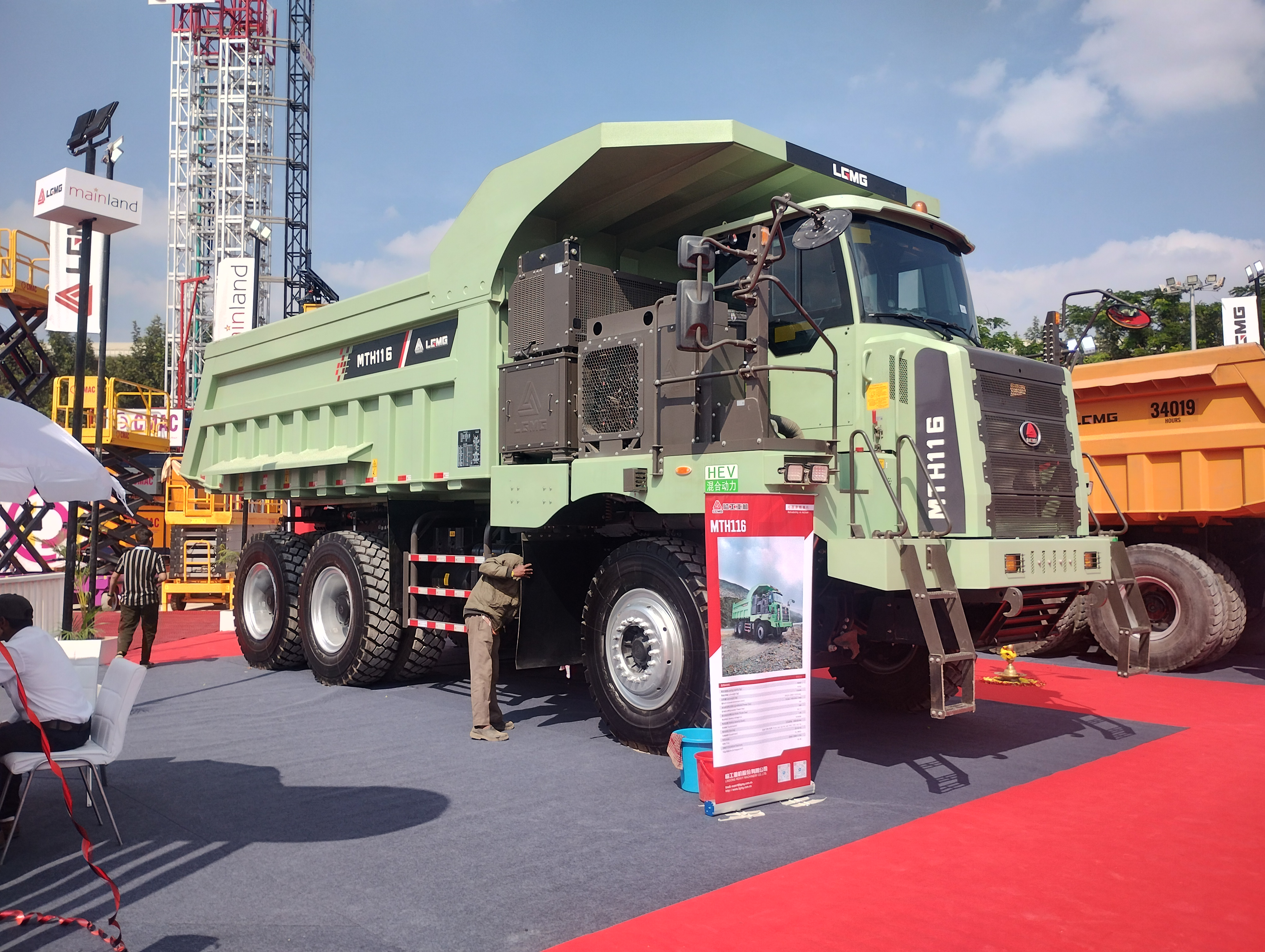

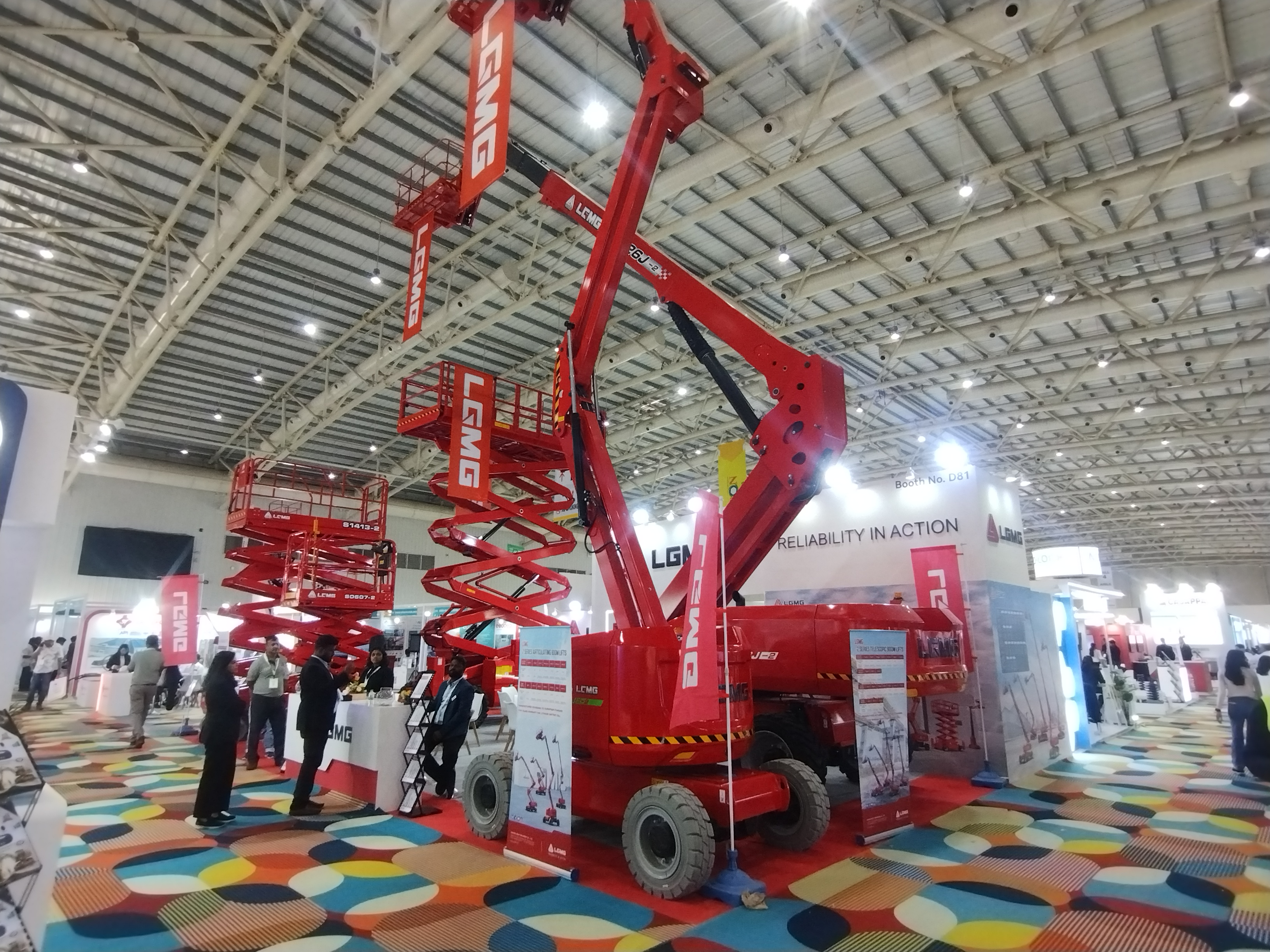
