= Santa Catarina River (Mexico) =

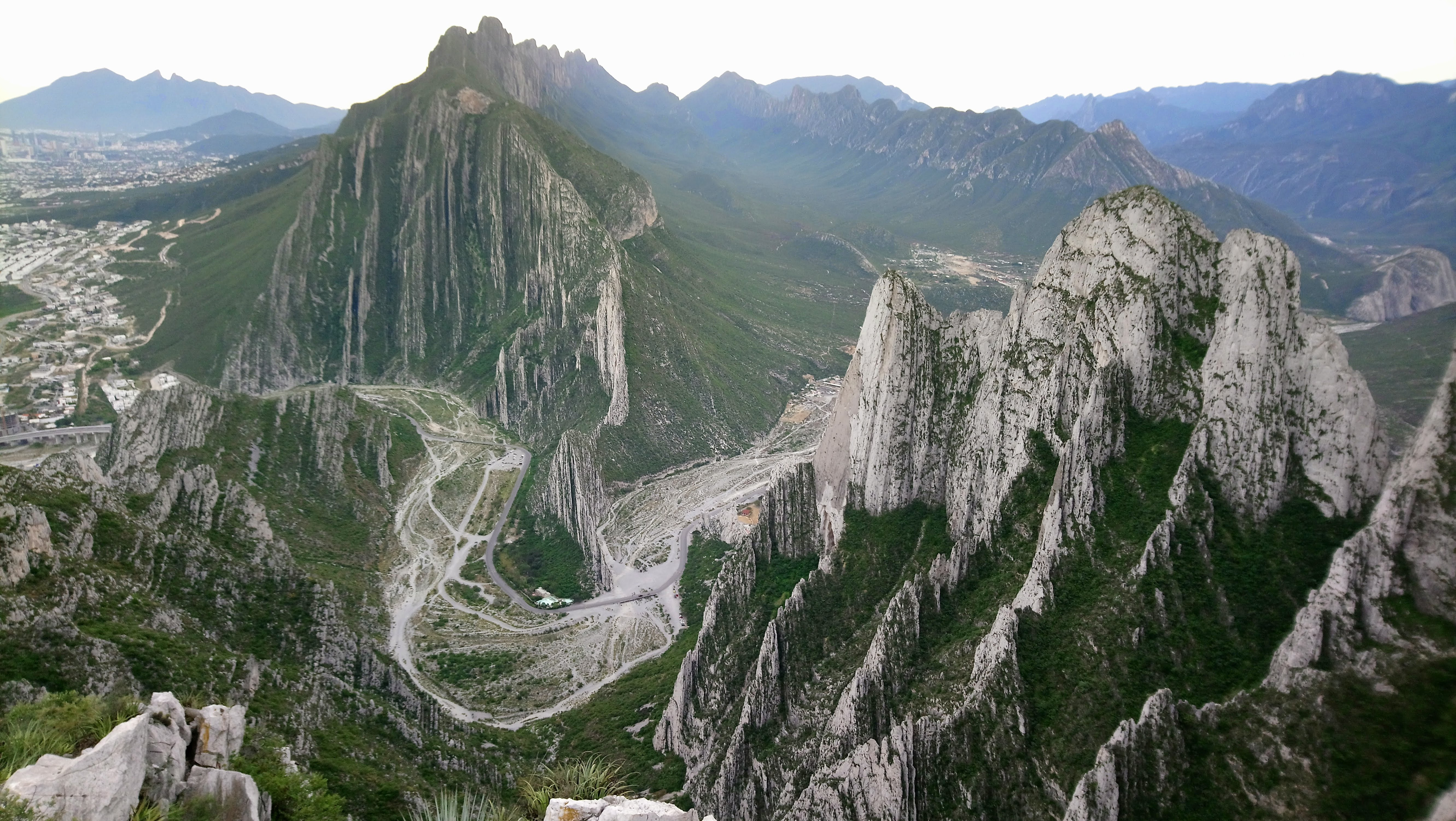

Location
- Country: Mexico

Physical characteristics
- Mouth: San Juan River
  - coordinates: 25°31′42″N 99°54′02″W

The Santa Catarina River (Río Santa Catarina in Spanish) is a river and a State Protected Natural Area in Nuevo León, Mexico; a tributary of the San Juan River and the Rio Grande, it flows through the Monterrey metropolitan area.

== History ==
The Santa Catarina River made the establishment of Monterrey and its metropolitan area possible and generated an economic system based on agriculture and livestock; on the other hand, it has also brought numerous floods. In 1596, the river was mentioned by Diego de Montemayor in the founding document of the capital of Nuevo León:

Spanish: Y se han de regar con el Agua de los Ríos de Santa Catarina y Santa Lucia y para ayudar á cultivar las dichas tierras los Indios Casiques Naturales de esta tierra que son el Casique Napayan Guachichil con su gente y el Casique Alguaron Borrado junto á los Coapuliguanes, y el Casique Juaquialene y como Agua coata es con su Gente.
English translation: And they are to be irrigated with the water of the rivers of Santa Catarina and Santa Lucia and to help cultivate the said lands the Casique Indians Native to this land who are the Casique Napayan Guachichil with its people and the Casique Alguaron Borrado together with the Coapuliguanes, and the Casique Juaquialene and as Agua coata is with its people.

In July 2010, Hurricane Alex caused severe flooding, landslides, and damage to homes, bridges, roads, and other infrastructure. Constitución and Ignacio Morones Prieto avenues, which run alongside the river, had to be redesigned and rebuilt. The 2007 linear park disappeared completely, along with other sports facilities and the market under the Puente del Papa. After the hurricane, no more sports or commercial facilities were built on the riverbed, allowing the ecosystem to recover.
