= José Arturo Salinas Garza =

Mexican politician

- Born: 11 April 1975 (age 51); Monterrey, Nuevo León, Mexico
- Occupation: Deputy
- Political party: PAN

José Arturo Salinas Garza (born 11 April 1975) is a Mexican lawyer affiliated with the PAN. As of 2013 he served as Deputy of the LXII Legislature of the Mexican Congress representing Nuevo León.
