= Monterrey Cathedral =

Metropolitan Cathedral of Our Lady of Monterrey
- Catedral Metropolitana de Nuestra Señora de Monterrey
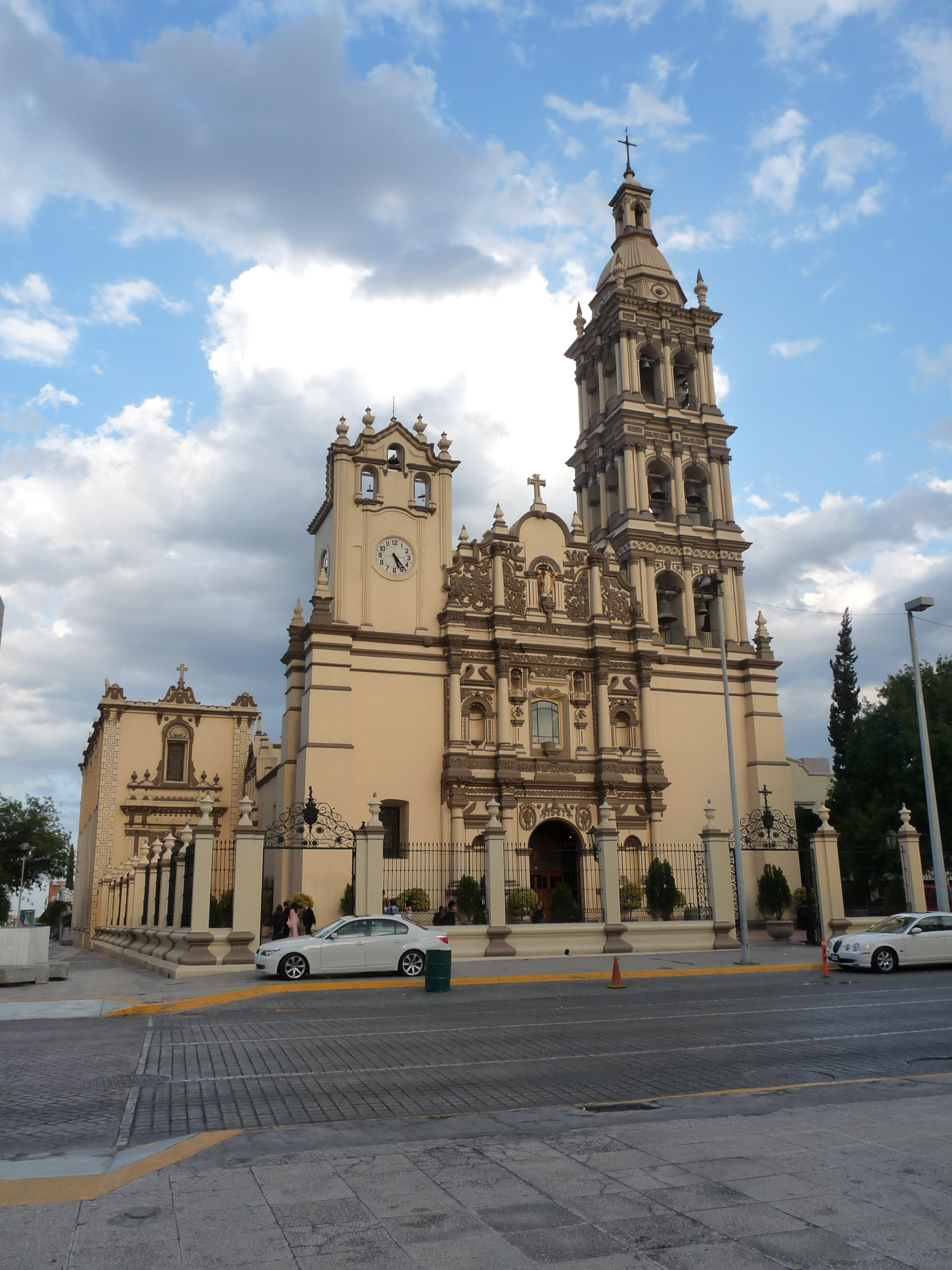
- Metropolitan Cathedral of Our Lady of Monterrey
- 25.6656°N 100.3098°W
- Location: Monterrey
- Country: Mexico
- Denomination: Catholic Church

The Metropolitan Cathedral of Our Lady of Monterrey (Spanish: Catedral Metropolitana de Nuestra Señora de Monterrey) also Monterrey Cathedral is the main Catholic church and home of the Archdiocese of Monterrey. It is located in the capital of the state of Nuevo León in Mexico.

The building has a central nave in the shape of a Latin cross flanked by niches chapels. The ship has arched vaults topped with an octagonal dome. The interior is sober and eclectic. It has a mix of architectural styles, neoclassical and baroque, the latter especially on its façade. The chapel of the tabernacle features an embossed silver front. In the choir there is a Merklin organ from 1893 (currently damaged and not in use).

It was built between 1705 and 1791 and declared a cathedral in 1777, when Pope Pius VI created the Diocese of Linares.

It has a mixture of architectural styles, neoclassical and baroque; the latter especially in its facade.

== See also ==
- Roman Catholicism in Mexico
