= Clariond =

Clariond is a surname. Notable people with the surname include:

- Benjamín Clariond, Mexican politician affiliated with the Institutional Revolutionary Party
- Fernando Canales Clariond (born 1946), Mexican politician and businessman affiliated with the National Action Party (PAN)
- Jacques Antoine Clariond, Mexican businessman

== See also ==
- Clarion (disambiguation)
