= Ñáñez =

Ñáñez is a surname. Notable people with the surname include:

- Carlos José Ñáñez (born 1946), Argentine bishop
- Freddy Ñáñez (born 1976), Venezuelan politician
- Javier Náñez Pro (born 1991), Mexican politician
- Lisa Náñez (born 1977), American footballer
