= 2003 Nuevo León state election =

Local election in Mexico

The Mexican state of Nuevo León held an election on Sunday, 6 July 2003. At stake was the office of the Nuevo León State Governor, and all 42 members of the unicameral Nuevo León State Congress, and 51 mayors and municipal councils.

== Governor ==
Results of the gubernatorial election (2003)
Party	Percentage	Votes
PRI/PVEM/FC	56.66	824,567
PAN	33.80	491,973
PRD	1.03	14,934
PT	4.99	72,620
PSN	0.18	2,592
PAS	0.13	1,959
MU	0.25	3,710
Null ballots	2.95	42,989
Total	100	1,455,344

Executive power rests in a governor, who is directly elected by the citizens, using a secret ballot, to a six-year term with no possibility of reelection. The position is open only to a Mexican citizen by birth, at least 30 years old with at least five years residency in Nuevo León.

The victorious candidate in this election was José Natividad González Parás, representing an alliance of the Institutional Revolutionary Party (PRI) and the Green Ecological Party (PVEM). González Parás beat the PAN candidate Mauricio Fernandez by twenty percentage points. This was a major victory for the PRI, which had lost badly in the elections six years earlier.

González Parás took office on October 4, 2003, for a term that will end on October 4, 2009.

== State congress ==
Parties represented in the 70th Legislature
Party	Directly elected	Plurinominal
PRI	18	5
PAN	6	5
PT	0	3
PVEM	2	1
Independent	0	1
PRD	0	1
Total	26	16

Legislative power in the state rests in a unicameral legislature composed of 42 deputies, also elected via secret ballot by the citizenry, 26 of whom are directly elected and 16 chosen according to a plurinominal system involving proportional representation. Following the election, the 70th Legislature consists of 23 PRI deputies, 11 from PAN, 3 from PT, 3 from PVEM, 1 from PRD, and one independent.

== See also ==
- Governors of Nuevo León
- Politics and government of Nuevo León
- List of political parties in Mexico
