= Alejandro Páez Aragón =

Mexican politician

Alejandro Alberto Carlos Páez y Aragón is a Mexican politician affiliated with the National Action Party (PAN).

Páez is a graduate of Stanford Graduate School of Business. He served as municipal president (mayor) of San Pedro Garza García from 2003 to 2006. In August 2006 Governor Natividad González designated Páez as Secretary of Economic Development but took office until November 2006.
