= Ricardo Canavati Tafich =

Mexican politician

Jesús Ricardo Canavati Tafich

Municipal president of Monterrey
- In office 31 October 2003 – 3 April 2006
- Preceded by: Felipe de Jesús Cantú
- Succeeded by: Edgar Olaiz Ortiz

Senator for Nuevo León
- In office 1 September 2000 – 18 March 2003
- Preceded by: Mauricio Fernández Garza
- Succeeded by: Rubén Zarazúa Rocha
- In office 1 September 1988 – 31 October 1991
- Preceded by: Raúl Salinas Lozano
- Succeeded by: María Elena Chapa Hernández

Member of the Chamber of Deputies for Nuevo León's 3rd district
- In office 1 September 1985 – 31 August 1988
- Preceded by: Carlota Vargas Garza
- Succeeded by: Felipe Onofre Zambrano Paéz

Personal details
- Born: 8 October 1943 (age 82) Monterrey
- Party: PRI; PVEM
- Occupation: Politician

Jesús Ricardo Canavati Tafich (born 8 October 1943) is a Mexican politician affiliated with the Institutional Revolutionary Party (PRI). He currently serves in the Chamber of Deputies of the Mexican Congress as an Ecologist Green Party of Mexico proportional representation deputy.

== Political career ==
Canavati's political career started in the late 1960s in the Mexico City Metro, where he was an administrative assistant, deputy director general, and comptroller. He then transferred to the Department of the Federal District, where he spent a year as the coordinator of the Directorate of Information and Statistical Analysis.

In 1973, his political career moved to his hometown of Monterrey. He was the town's general comptroller; a year later, he became the director general of the Trust for the Metropolitan Fund of Monterrey (FOMERREY). He served as mayor of San Nicolás de los Garza (1979–1982), and after a brief stint in the PRI's teaching arm in Nuevo León, he occupied a seat in the Chamber of Deputies for the LIII Legislature of the Mexican Congress, which convened from 1985 to 1988. He was a senator in the LIV Legislature from 1988 to 1991, during which time he briefly served as the president of a PRI commission on financing and asset management.

During the early and mid-1990s, he served in various public service positions, including in the Secretariat of Urban Development and Ecology and then within the Secretariat of Social Development. In 1997, voters sent Canavati back to the Chamber of Deputies for the LVII Legislature. He was the vice coordinator of the PRI parliamentary group and its primary spokesman. Additionally, he sat on commissions dealing with Urban Development and Land Use; Economic Development; Foreign Relations/North America and Foreign Relations/Europe and Africa; Communications and Transportation; and Bicameral for the Canal del Congreso, and was a general coordinator in the National Confederation of Popular Organizations.

In 2000, Canavati was elected to serve in the Senate once more, for the LVIII Legislature. He sat on most of the comparable commissions to those from his previous term in the Chamber of Deputies. During this time, he was the president of the PRI in Nuevo León. He permanently resigned from the Senate effective March 18, 2003, in order to begin his campaign for the municipal presidency of Monterrey. He defeated PAN candidate Francisco Cantú, and in taking the mayorship of the city, he was replaced in the Senate by his alternate, Rubén Zarazúa Rocha.

In 2006, Canavati returned to the Chamber of Deputies for the LX Legislature, this time as a proportional representation deputy from the second electoral region. He served on the Federal District, Culture, and Metropolitan Development Commissions.

Canavati was placed on a proportional representation list again to return to San Lázaro for the LXIII Legislature, this time from the PRI's electoral ally, the Ecologist Green Party of Mexico (PVEM). He serves on three commissions—Economy, Finances and Public Credit, and Justice— and additionally was the vice president of the Mesa de Decanos, indicating that his previous tenure was the second longest of all of the deputies of the LXIII Legislature.

== Personal ==
Canavati Tafich is married to Elena Hadjópulos, with whom he has had four children: Elenitza, Jesús, Ricardo and Eugenio.

Preceded by Felipe de Jesús Cantú Rodríguez	Municipal president of Monterrey; 2003–2006	Succeeded by Edgar Oláiz Ortiz
