= Fernando Margáin =

Mexican politician

Mayor of San Pedro Garza García
- In office 2006–2009
- Preceded by: Alejandro Páez
- Succeeded by: Mauricio Fernandez

Personal details
- Born: Monterrey, Nuevo León
- Political party: Humanist Party
- Spouse: Alejandra Sada de Margain
- Profession: Lawyer

Fernando Margáin Berlanga (born 1952) is a Mexican politician from the State of Nuevo León affiliated with the National Action Party (PAN) who has served in the upper house of the Mexican Congress.

Margáin served as municipal president (mayor) of San Pedro from 1994 to 1997. Later, from 1997 to 1999, he served in the cabinet of Governor Fernando Canales.

In 2000 he was elected to serve in the Senate of Mexico.

He was municipal president (mayor) of San Pedro Garza García again from 2006 to 2009.

Son of Ricardo Margain Zozaya who was one of the main politicians in Nuevo León State in the 1960s and 1970s. Fernando Margáin is married to Alejandra Sada de Margáin.

In March 2015, he announced his intention of running for municipal president (mayor) of San Pedro Garza García again, this time as a candidate for the Humanist Party.

== See also ==
- 1994 Nuevo León state election
- 2006 Nuevo León state election
