= Jaime Rodríguez Calderón =

Mexican politician

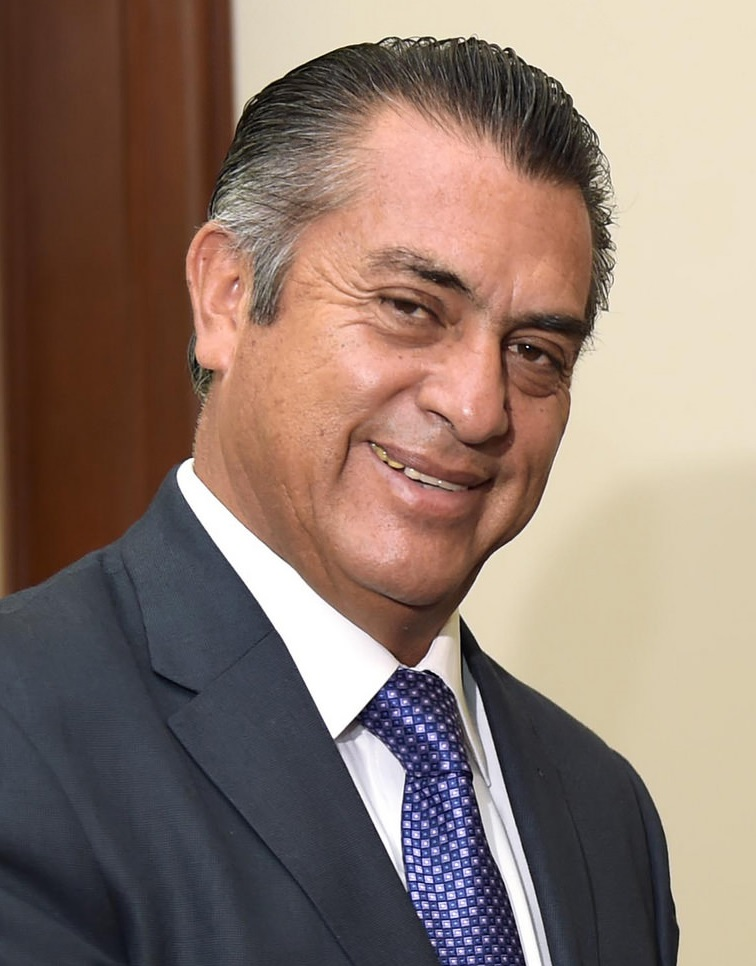
- Rodríguez Calderón in 2015

Governor of Nuevo León
- In office 2 July 2018 – 3 October 2021
- Preceded by: Manuel Florentino González Flores (interim)
- Succeeded by: Samuel García Sepúlveda
- In office 4 October 2015 – 31 December 2017
- Preceded by: Rodrigo Medina de la Cruz
- Succeeded by: Manuel Florentino González Flores (interim)

Mayor of García
- In office 1 November 2009 – 31 October 2012
- Preceded by: Guadalupe Alejandra Valadez Arrambide
- Succeeded by: Jesus Hernández Martínez

Member of the Congress of Nuevo León
- In office 1 November 1997 – 31 October 2000
- Succeeded by: Armando Ramírez Anguiano
- Constituency: 10th district

Member of the Chamber of Deputies
- In office 1 November 1991 – 31 October 1994
- Preceded by: Eleazar Bazaldúa Bazaldúa
- Succeeded by: Jesús Siller Rojas
- Constituency: Nuevo León's 5th district

Personal details
- Born: Jaime Heliodoro Rodríguez Calderón; 28 December 1957 (age 68) Ejido Pablillo, Nuevo León, Mexico
- Party: Independent (2014–present)
- Other political affiliations: Institutional Revolutionary Party (1980–2014)
- Spouses: María Eugenia Gutiérrez; Silvia Mireya González; Adalina Dávalos Martínez (m. 2006)
- Children: 6
- Education: Autonomous University of Nuevo Leon (BS)

Jaime Heliodoro Rodríguez Calderón (born 28 December 1957), sometimes referred to by his nickname "El Bronco", is a Mexican politician. He served as the Governor of Nuevo León from 2015 to 2021 and was a candidate in the 2018 presidential election.

Born in Ejido Pablillo, Galeana, Nuevo León, Rodríguez earned a degree in agricultural engineering at the UANL. He joined the Institutional Revolutionary Party (PRI) in 1980 and served as a federal deputy from 1991 to 1994, local deputy from 1997 to 2000, and mayor of García, Nuevo León from 2009 to 2012, where he was best known for his hard-line stance against organized crime. In 2014, Rodríguez left the PRI and participated in the 2015 gubernatorial election as an independent candidate, receiving half the votes and becoming the first independent candidate to win a governorship in Mexico.

In 2017, he requested a temporary leave of absence from the governorship to become an independent candidate in the 2018 presidential election. He lost to Andrés Manuel López Obrador, only attaining 5% of the popular vote.

== Early life and education ==
Jaime Heliodoro Rodríguez Calderón was born on 28 December 1957, in Ejido Pablillo, a small town in the municipality of Galeana, Nuevo León. He was the fourth of ten children born to farmers Rodulfo Rodríguez and Basilisa Calderón.

He attended primary school at Escuadrón 201 in Ejido Pablillo, secondary school at Miguel Hidalgo in Galeana, and high school at Preparatoria 4 of the Autonomous University of Nuevo León (UANL). Rodríguez majored in agricultural engineering at the UANL and graduated in 1982.

While attending university, he led a student movement protesting the increase in public transportation fares. The movement successfully secured the establishment of a special transportation subsidy for students from Governor Alfonso Martínez Domínguez.

== Early political career ==
In 1980, he joined the Institutional Revolutionary Party (PRI). During Jorge Treviño Martínez's term as governor of Nuevo León, Rodríguez served as the head of the state's forestry program. In 1990, he was appointed secretary of the Youth Action division of the National Peasant Confederation (CNC).

Rodríguez was nominated by the PRI as a candidate to the Congress of the Union representing the 5th district of Nuevo León in the 1991 legislative election. He was elected as a federal deputy and served in the LV Legislature of the Mexican Congress from 1 November 1991 to 31 October 1994.

Rodríguez was elected as a local deputy in the Congress of Nuevo León, representing the PRI for the state's 10th district, from 1 November 1997 to 31 October 2000.

In the 2000 local elections of Nuevo León, he ran as the PRI candidate for the mayor of Guadalupe, Nuevo León, but was defeated by the National Action Party nominee, Pedro Garza Treviño.

=== Mayor of García ===
He was the Institutional Revolutionary Party's candidate for mayor of García, Nuevo León, in the 2009 state elections. He was elected with 46.2% of the vote, beating the PAN candidate who came in second with 35.5% of the vote. "El Bronco" governed the municipality from 1 November 2009, to 31 October 2012.

Four days after taking office, on 4 November 2009, his Secretary of Public Security, Juan Arturo Esparza García, and his bodyguards were murdered by an armed group. In response, Rodríguez Calderón decided to purge the municipal police force amid suspicions that some of its members were complicit in the murder.

=== Assassination attempts ===
During his tenure as mayor of García, he survived three assassination attempts during the tenure, Rodríguez was the target of violent attacks by Los Zetas. As mayor, he fought to reduce crime in the municipality. The 2013 documentary El Bronco sin Miedo (The Fearless Bronco) portrayed the attacks. He also invested in education and social development programs in García.

== 2015 gubernatorial campaign ==
=== Candidate registration ===
On 14 September 2014, Rodríguez left the Institutional Revolutionary Party (PRI) with the intention of running as an independent candidate for the governorship of the state of Nuevo León. He cited disappointment with rising corruption within the PRI and the lack of confidence the Nuevo León public had in establishment parties like the PRI and the National Action Party (PAN).

Rodríguez formally registered his candidacy with the State Electoral Commission on 3 December 2014. To qualify for the election, he needed to demonstrate the support of at least 3% of the state's electoral roll, equivalent to 103,000 signatures. By the end of the signature collection period, he had gathered 334,000 signatures, representing 9.7% of the state's electoral roll.

=== Gubernatorial election ===
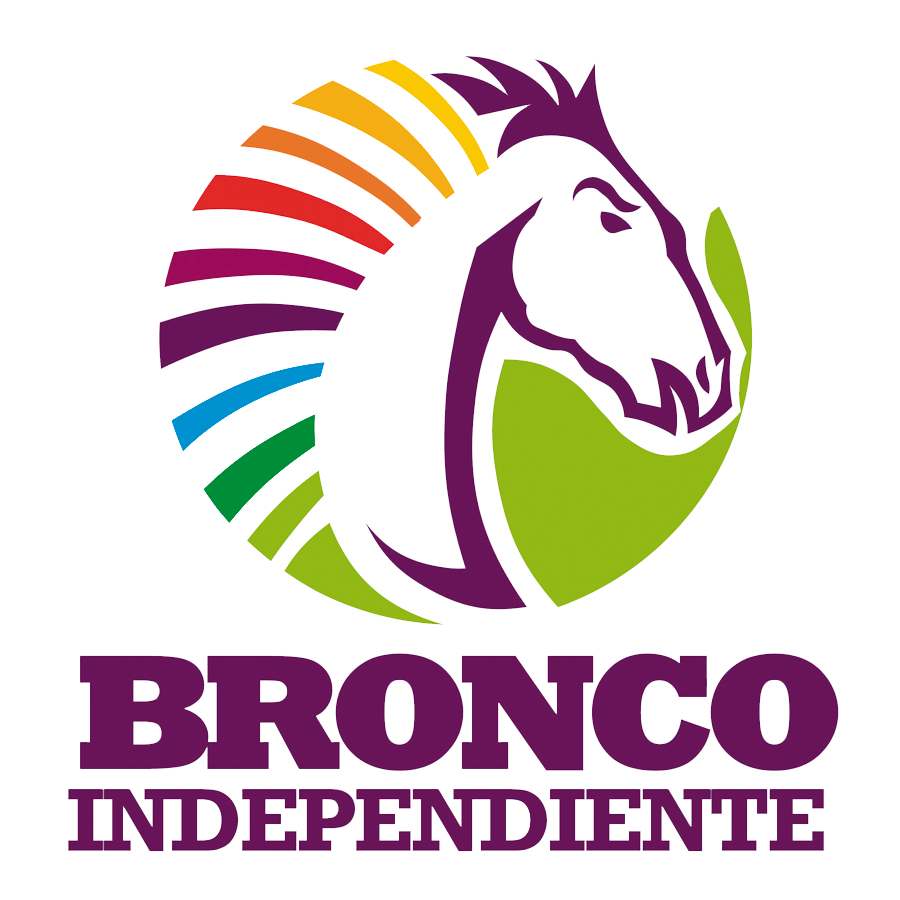
Campaign logo of "El Bronco" as independent candidate for governor.

Rodríguez highlighted the inequality in the distribution of campaign budgets, noting that independent candidates received significantly less funding than party-affiliated candidates. He received only 383,329 pesos for his campaign, whereas the PRI and PAN candidates received 60 million and 50 million pesos, respectively. Due to this, Rodríguez launched a digital platform in order to raise funds for his campaign.

On 20 April, during the first gubernatorial debate, Raúl Guajardo Cantú of the Social Encounter Party endorsed Rodríguez and withdrew from the race. On 21 May, Fernando Elizondo Barragán, former acting governor of Nuevo León and the gubernatorial candidate for Citizens' Movement, also withdrew and endorsed Rodríguez.

On 7 June 2015, Rodríguez was elected Governor of Nuevo León in a landslide victory, securing 48.82% of the vote and defeating his nearest opponent, the PRI's Ivonne Álvarez, by 24.97 points. He became the first independent candidate to win a governorship in Mexico.

== Governor of Nuevo León (2015–2021) ==
Rodríguez became Governor of Nuevo León on 4 October 2015.

Rodríguez requested a six-month leave of absence, effective 1 January 2018, in order to run for president in the 2018 election. On 22 December 2017, the Congress of Nuevo León approved the leave, designating Manuel Florentino González Flores as interim governor. Following his loss in the presidential election, on 2 July, Rodríguez became governor again.

=== Infrastructure ===
==== Metrorrey ====
Rodríguez continued the construction of Line 3, which was completed in 2019 but remained inoperable due to the lack of rolling stock. In December 2019, it was announced that CRRC would manufacture 26 train cars, and the line eventually became operational in February 2021.

Rodríguez's administration also terminated free Sunday services and acquired 24 reconditioned train cars for Lines 1 and 2. Although a gradual fare increase was proposed—raising fares by 10 cents each month until reaching MXN $9 in November 2021—the plan was later scrapped in 2020. The governor cited the lower cost of acquiring the reconditioned train cars as the reason for maintaining the current fare.

=== Crisis management ===
COVID-19 pandemic response

On 11 March 2020, the state government confirmed the first positive case of COVID-19 in Nuevo León. On 17 March, Rodríguez announced the closure of movie theaters, casinos, party rooms, and parks. He also confirmed that in-person classes for preschool and primary school would be suspended and moved to Canal 28 Nuevo León, a state-owned TV channel. In response to rising cases, on 25 April, the administration suspended public transportation services on Sundays and reduced operating hours for the remaining weekdays.

In March 2020, Rodríguez joined Miguel Ángel Riquelme Solís, governor of Coahuila, and Francisco García Cabeza de Vaca, governor of Tamaulipas, in forming the Coordinación Noreste COVID-19 (in English: Northeastern Coordination COVID-19). The governors agreed to establish a sanitary fence around each of their states and criticized the lack of federal funds to combat the pandemic. In early April 2020, the governors decided to cremate bodies whose cause of death was COVID-19, a move that was criticized by the Secretariat of the Interior.

Rodríguez often published memes on social media designed to raise awareness about COVID-19, encourage the use of face masks, and incentivize people to get vaccinated.

=== Claims of lack of news media coverage ===
On 11 September 2016, during a live broadcast of "Monterrey al Día", Televisa news reporter Karla Minaya was overheard saying, "We have to ensure that the governor is mentioned as little as possible." The incident was captured on video and published by the Mexican newspaper El Universal, gaining national media attention.

Rodríguez's predecessor, Rodrigo Medina de la Cruz, reportedly spent MXN $4 billion on bribing television news outlets, including Televisa, to improve his public image. In contrast, Rodríguez vowed not to spend any public funds on media coverage. He claimed that Televisa and other major networks, such as Multimedios and TV Azteca, deliberately minimize or negatively bias their coverage of his administration due to his refusal to pay for favorable reporting. Rodríguez cited examples of his administration's successes, such as recovering 229 out of 314 reported stolen cars and dismantling a car theft ring, which he claimed went unreported by these media outlets due to his policy against bribery.

== 2018 presidential campaign ==
Rodríguez's bid to run in the 2018 presidential election, again as an independent, initially didn't reach the required number of 866,593 signatures to appear on the ballot, with only 849,937 being deemed valid by the National Electoral Institute, but his attorney Javier Náñez Pro appealed to the Federal Electoral Tribunal, which ordered the National Electoral Institute to register him as a candidate.

During a debate in April, Rodríguez said: "We have to cut off the hands of those who rob. It's that simple." As a result, Rodríguez was trending ahead of the other candidates on Twitter during the debate.

Rodríguez later proposed to bring back the death penalty (which was officially abolished in Mexico in 2005 and last used by the Mexican government in 1961) for drug traffickers, hijackers, infanticides, and serial killers.

According to exit polls, Rodríguez Calderón only attained about 5% of the vote and recognized Andrés Manuel López Obrador's victory within an hour of the polls closing.

On 25 September 2019, the Federal Electoral Tribunal approved the validity of sanctioning Rodríguez Calderón for using 572 state employees to gather signatures for his 2018 candidacy. They also approved an MXN 153,384 (U.S. $7,800) fine for using public resources to promote his 2014–2015 campaign for governor. Rodríguez plans to appeal to the Supreme Court (SCJN).

== Personal life ==
Jaime Rodríguez Calderón has had six children and has been married three times. His first wife was María Eugenia Gutiérrez, with whom he had two children: Zoraida and Jaime Lizenco Rodríguez Gutiérrez; she was killed in October 2009 in a vehicular accident while being pursued by criminals. His second marriage was with Silvia Mireya González, with whom he had his daughter Jimena Rodríguez González. His third marriage was on 25 January 2006 with Adalina Dávalos Martínez, with whom he has had three children: Valentina, Victoria and Emiliano; he also adopted Alejandro, a son of his current wife from another relationship.
