= 2015 Nuevo León state election =

- 7 June 2015
- Gubernatorial election
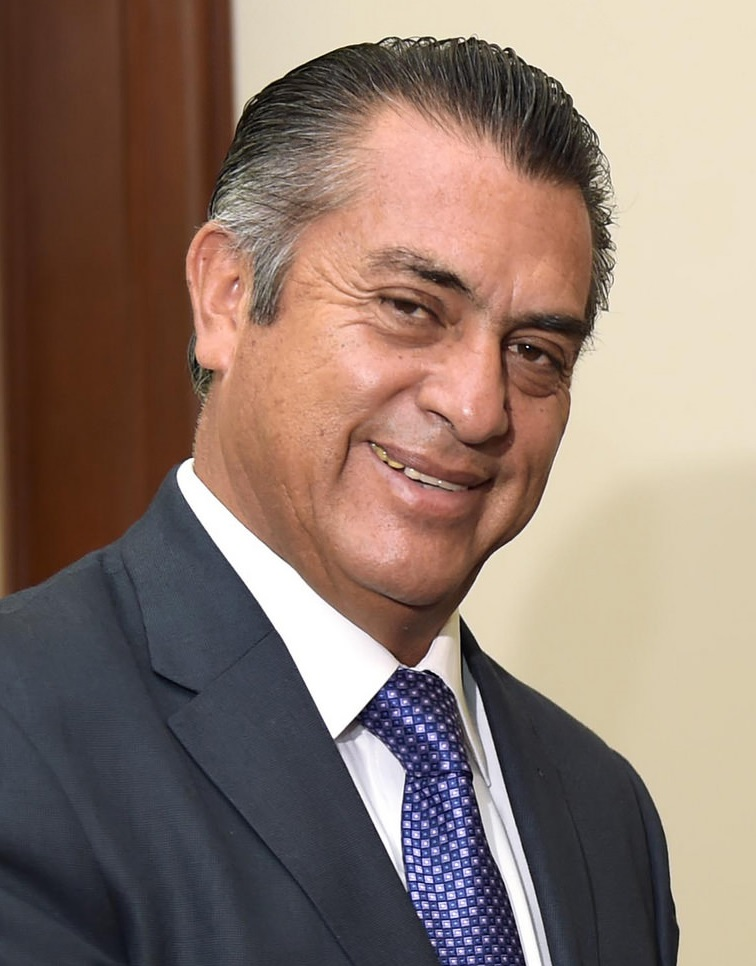

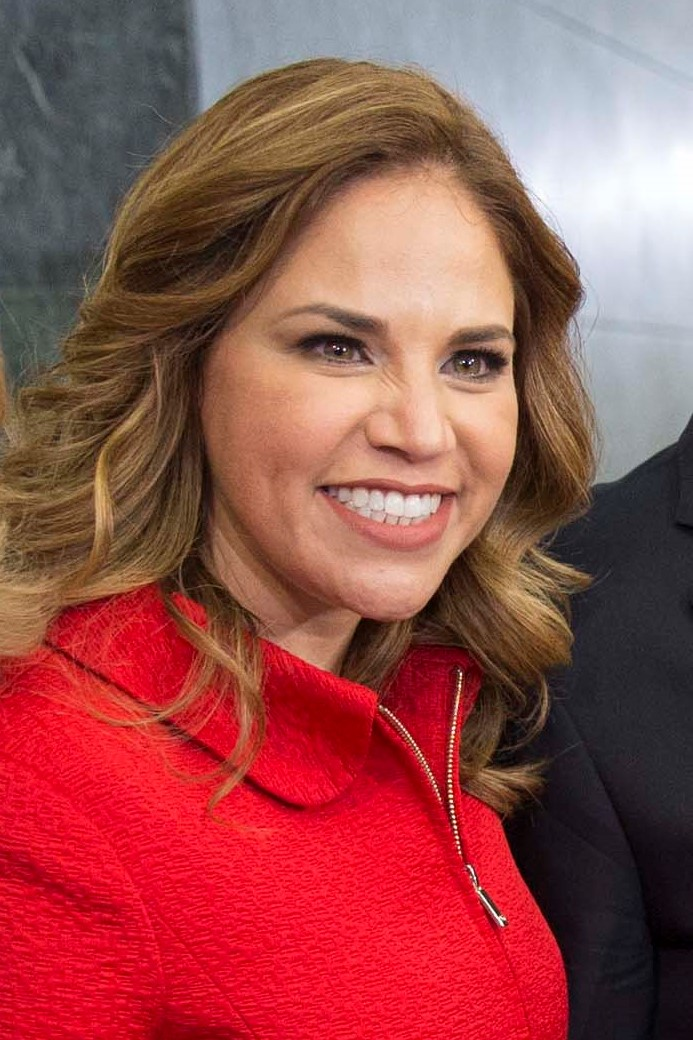

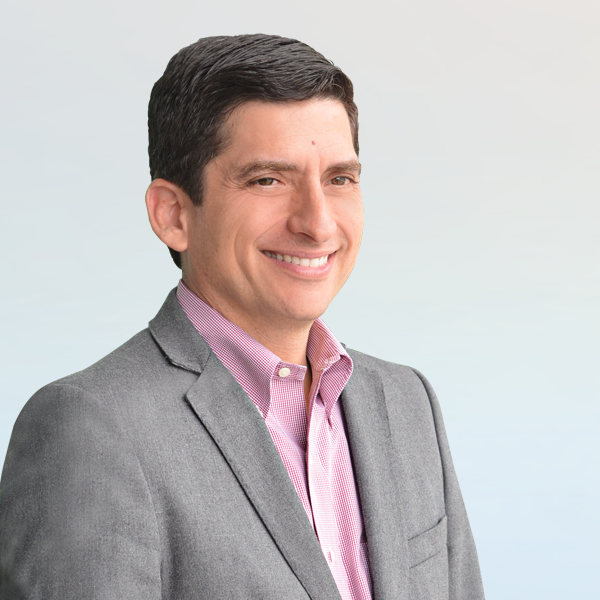
| Nominee | Jaime Rodríguez Calderón | Ivonne Alvarez | Felipe de Jesús Cantú Rodríguez |
| Party | Independent | PRI | PAN |
| Alliance | | Alianza por tu Seguridad |
| Popular vote | 1,020,552 | 498,644 | 466,543 |
| Percentage | 49.90% | 24.38% | 22.81% |
Governor before election
Rodrigo Medina de la Cruz
PRI
Elected Governor
Jaime Rodríguez Calderón
Independent

A local election was held in the Mexican state of Nuevo León on Sunday, June 7, 2015, to elect, on the local level:

- Governor of Nuevo León
- 51 municipal presidents (mayors) to serve for a three-year term. (they will be for the first time eligible for reelection)
- 42 local deputies (26 by the first-past-the-post system and 16 by proportional representation) to serve for a three-year term in the Congress of Nuevo León.

== Campaign ==
Ten candidates ran for Governor of Nuevo Leon including, for the first time, an independent candidate. Two of the candidates, Fernando Elizondo and Raul Guajardo did not completed the campaign since both decided to decline and supported Jaime Rodriguez Calderon.

== Results ==
=== Gubernatorial election ===
| Candidate | Party or alliance | | Votes | % |
|---|---|---|---|---|
| Jaime Rodríguez Calderón | Independent | | 1,020,552 | 49.90 |
| Ivonne Álvarez | Alianza por tu Seguridad | Institutional Revolutionary Party | 498,644 | 24.38 |
| Ivonne Álvarez | Alianza por tu Seguridad | Ecologist Green Party of Mexico | 498,644 | 24.38 |
| Ivonne Álvarez | Alianza por tu Seguridad | New Alliance Party | 498,644 | 24.38 |
| Ivonne Álvarez | Alianza por tu Seguridad | Partido Demócrata | 498,644 | 24.38 |
| Felipe de Jesús Cantú Rodríguez | National Action Party | | 466,543 | 22.81 |
| Asael Sepúlveda Martínez | Labor Party | | 16,132 | 0.79 |
| Fernando Elizondo Barragán | Citizens' Movement | | 10,881 | 0.53 |
| Humberto González Sesma | Party of the Democratic Revolution | | 10,104 | 0.49 |
| Jesús María Elizondo González | Partido Humanista | | 7,617 | 0.37 |
| Raúl Guajardo Cantú | Social Encounter Party | | 6,679 | 0.33 |
| Rogelio González Ramírez | National Regeneration Movement | | 6,536 | 0.32 |
| Luis Servando Farías González | Partido Cruzada Ciudadana | | 1,580 | 0.08 |
| Total | | | 2,045,268 | 100.00 |
| Valid votes | | | 2,045,268 | 97.85 |
| Invalid/blank votes | | | 45,012 | 2.15 |
| Total votes | | | 2,090,280 | 100.00 |
Source: Tribunal Electoral del Poder Judicial de la Federación (SUP-JRC-0656-2015)
