= Margáin =

Margáin is a surname. Notable people with the surname include:

- Fernando Margáin (born 1952), Mexican politician
- Hugo B. Margáin (1913–1997), Mexican economist, politician and diplomat
