= Margarita Arellanes Cervantes =

Mexican politician

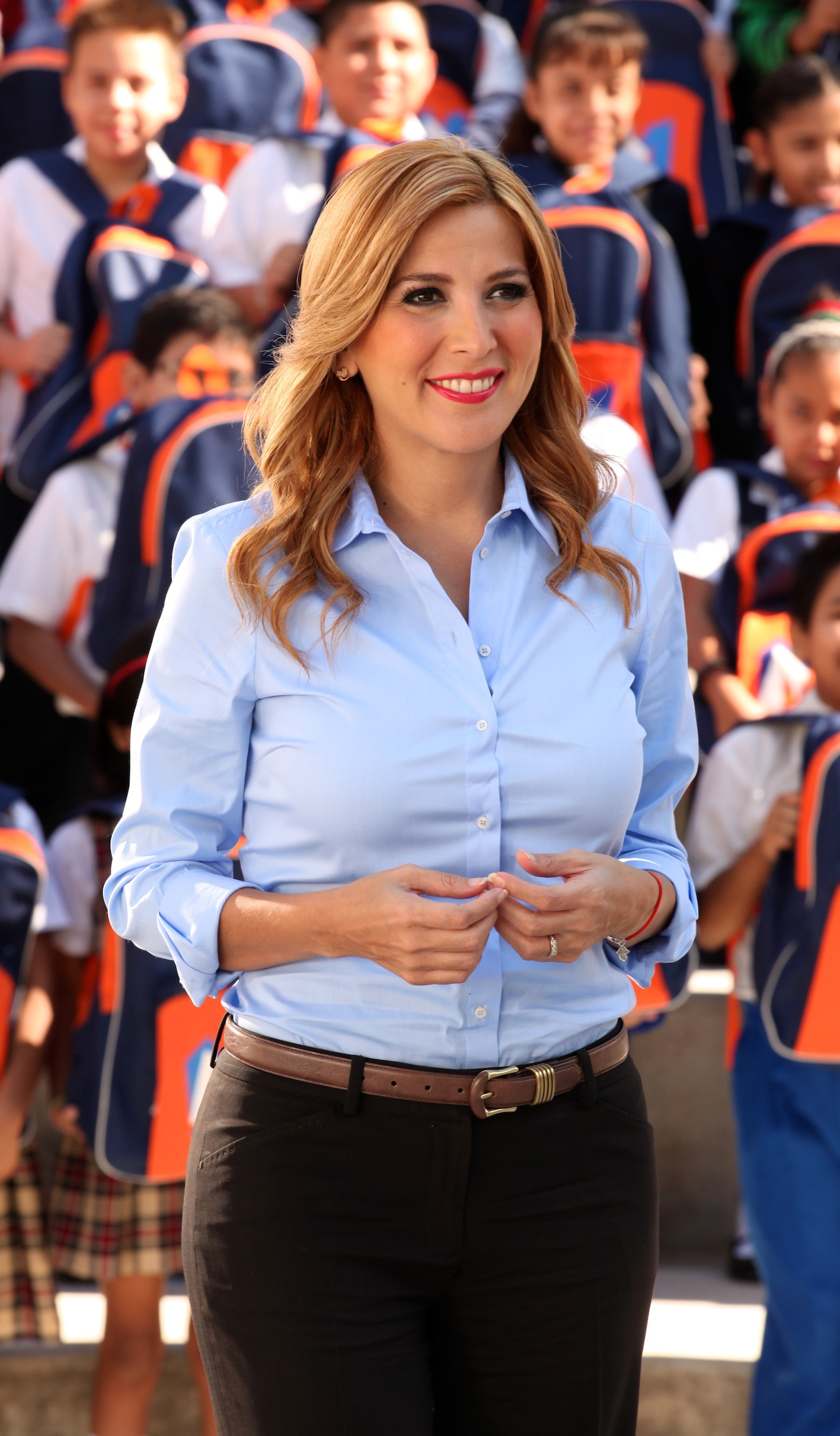

Municipal president of Monterrey
- In office 1 November 2012 – 30 October 2015
- Preceded by: Fernando Larrazábal Bretón
- Succeeded by: Adrián de la Garza

Personal details
- Born: Monterrey, Mexico
- Party: PAN
- Education: UANL

Margarita Arellanes Cervantes is a Mexican politician born in Monterrey affiliated with the National Action Party.

In 2012 she won the Monterrey municipal elections and became the first female municipal president of Monterrey.

Arellanes was elected to a three-year term but in December 2014 left office to seek her party nomination as the PAN candidate for the 2015 Gubernatorial election. Arellanes began the internal race as the favorite candidate but after losing support from different party leader she was defeated by candidate Felipe de Jesús Cantú Rodríguez. In March 2015 she took office again to finish her term as Mayor of Monterrey.
