= Zarazúa =

Zarazúa is a Basque surname. Notable people with the surname include:

- Renata Zarazúa (born 1997), Mexican tennis player
- Rubén Zarazúa Rocha (born 1941), Mexican politician
- Vicente Zarazúa (1944–2025), Mexican tennis player
