= Felipe de Jesús Cantú Rodríguez =

Mexican politician

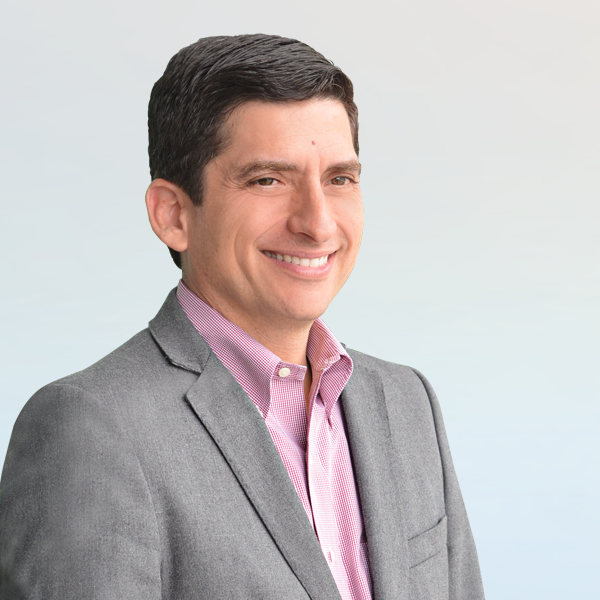
- Born: 9 May 1966 (age 60); Monterrey, Nuevo León, Mexico
- Education: Instituto Tecnológico Autónomo de México
- Occupation: Politician
- Political party: PAN

Felipe de Jesús Cantú Rodríguez (Note: In this Mexican name, the surname is Cantú and the second or maternal family name is Rodríguez.) (born 9 May 1966) is a Mexican politician.

As a member of the National Action Party (PAN), he served as a plurinominal deputy during the 57th and 61st sessions of Congress. He also served as municipal president of Monterrey from 2000 to 2003.

== 2015 Nuevo León gubernatorial election ==
In February 2015 Cantú Rodríguez won the PAN primaries in the state of Nuevo León by defeating candidate Margarita Arellanes who began the internal race as the favorite. Cantú officially became the PAN candidate for the 2015 Nuevo León gubernatorial election Cantú was placed third, and the election was won by the independent candidate Jaime Rodríguez Calderón.

== 2027 Nuevo León gubernatorial election ==
In June 2026, Cantú Rodríguez announced his intention to seek the nomination of the National Regeneration Movement (Morena) for the 2027 Nuevo León gubernatorial election.
