= Gerardo Ruiz Mateos =

Mexican engineer and politician

Secretary of Economy
- In office August 6, 2008 – December 1, 2012
- President: Felipe Calderón
- Preceded by: Eduardo Sojo
- Succeeded by: Bruno Francisco Ferrari García de Alba

Personal details
- Born: Mexico City, Mexico
- Party: PAN
- Education: ITESM
- Occupation: Politician

Gerardo Ruiz Mateos (born in Mexico City) is a Mexican engineer and politician. He is also the former Secretariat of Economy (2008–2010).

| Preceded by Eduardo Sojo | Secretary of Economy; 2008–2010 | Succeeded by Bruno Francisco Ferrari García de Alba |
