= Rodrigo Medina de la Cruz =

Mexican politician

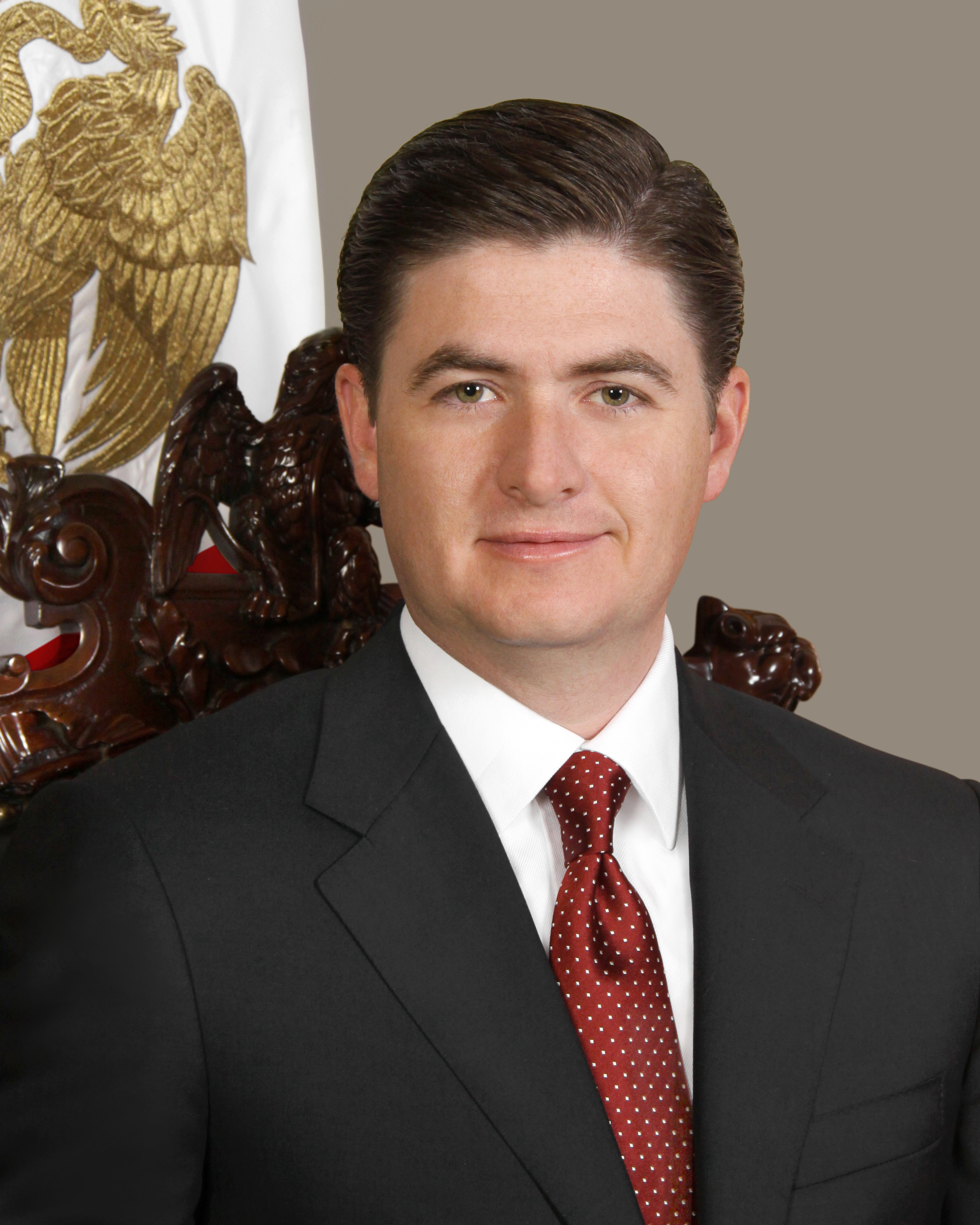

Governor of Nuevo León
- In office October 4, 2009 – October 3, 2015
- Preceded by: José Natividad González Parás
- Succeeded by: Jaime Rodríguez Calderón

Personal details
- Born: September 9, 1972 (age 53) Monterrey, Nuevo León
- Party: Institutional Revolutionary Party

Rodrigo Medina de la Cruz (born September 9, 1972) is a Mexican politician affiliated with the Institutional Revolutionary Party (PRI). He served as governor of Nuevo León from 2009 to 2015. He was linked by Operation Tornado to legal proceedings against him for embezzlement, property crimes, abuse of authority, and unjust enrichment, along with 14 other public servants, deputies, former deputies, and fellow family members and associates. He was, therefore, held in preventive custody on January 26, 2017.

== Political career ==
Medina earned his bachelor's degree from the Universidad Regiomontana and his master's from the University of Miami. His political career has been linked to José Natividad González Parás, whom he served in different positions. In 2006, Medina was elected to the Chamber of Deputies for Nuevo León's 2nd district. In 2009, Medina ran for governor of Nuevo León; he won, defeating PAN candidate Fernando Elizondo Barragán.

Medina took office as governor of Nuevo León on October 4, 2009.

In Coahuila, Medina served as finance minister for the state's PRI administration. He wanted to be governor of the state, but he was involved in the theft of medical equipment from a hospital, so he was forced to quit the campaign and move to Nuevo León.

In Nuevo León, Medina worked for the González Parás administration and later decided to campaign for the state's government, which he won in 2009.

After five and a half years, he took the state's debt from MXN 25 billion to over MXN 100 billion.

His successor as governor of the state, Jaime Rodríguez Calderón, said in an interview for El Norte that the state's finances were orphaned (without a mother) to express the state of the finances.

During an interview with Héctor Benavides, a nightly news host for the Multimedios TV network, Medina said debt was good for the people. After the interview, he flew on a state helicopter to McAllen, Texas, where his children attended school.

The FBI and DEA opened an investigation into the Medina family for their luxury properties, mainly in San Antonio, Texas.

Medina denied the charges and declared that all his wealth was obtained through his hard work since it wasn't easy to plan how to get all the money from the state, and it required a lot of work and dedication during his six-year term.

His administration ended on October 3, 2015. He was declared the governor with the highest debt in the history of the state of Nuevo León, as he took the debt from MXN 25 billion to an estimated MXN 120 billion, including short-term debt.

Political offices
Preceded by José Natividad González Parás	Governor of Nuevo León; 2009 – 2015	Succeeded by Jaime Rodríguez Calderón
