= Eduardo Sojo Garza-Aldape =

Mexican economist and politician

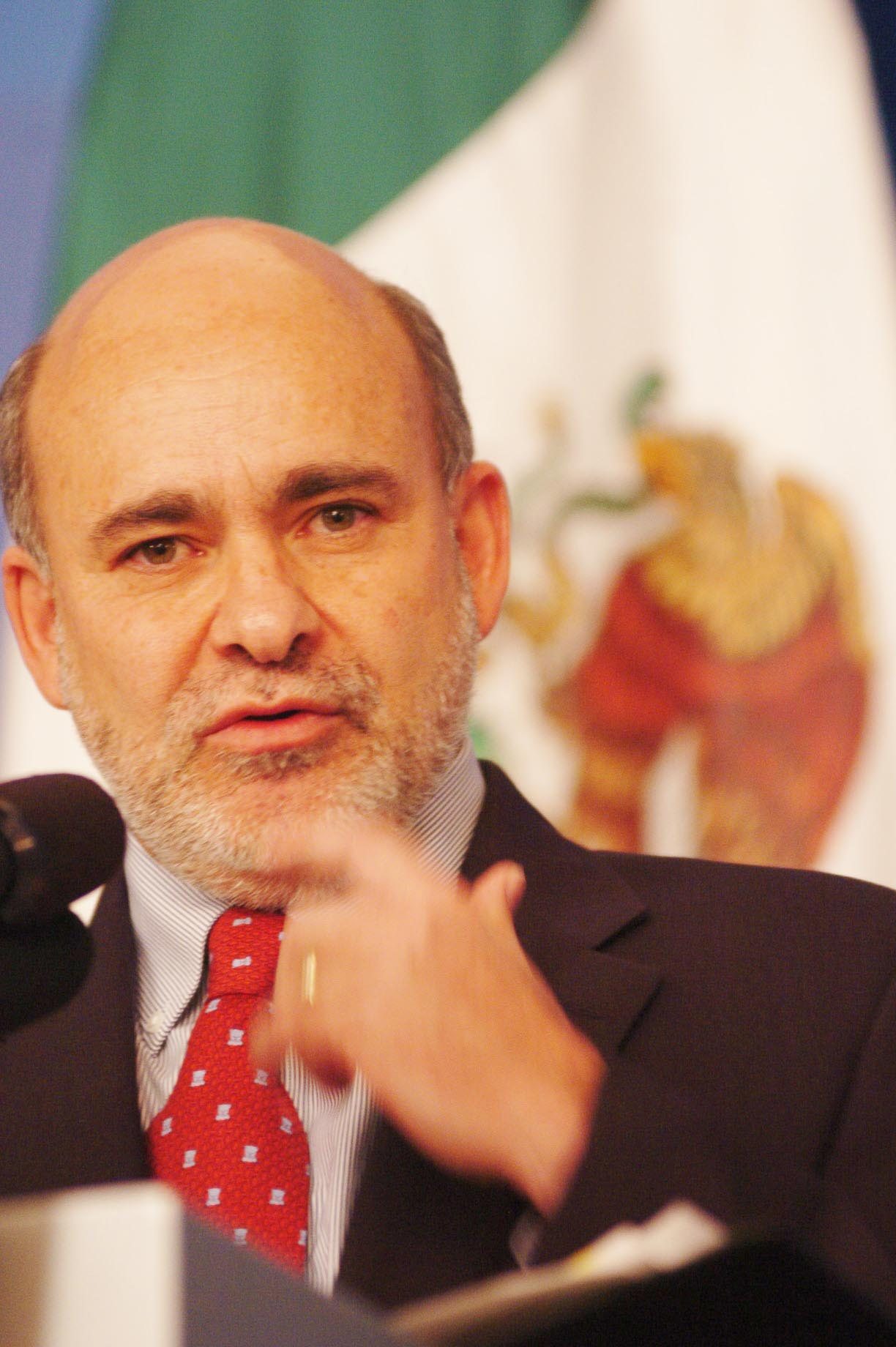
- Born: January 9, 1956 (age 69)
- Occupation: Economist

Eduardo Sojo Garza-Aldape (born January 9, 1956, in León, Guanajuato) is a Mexican economist. He served as chief economic advisor to President Vicente Fox and as Secretary of Economy in the cabinet of President Felipe Calderón from December 1, 2006 to August 6, 2008.

Sojo graduated from the Monterrey Institute of Technology and Higher Studies (ITESM) with a bachelor's degree in Economics and received both a master's degree in economics and a doctorate in Industrial Organization and Finance from the University of Pennsylvania, where he published several papers on econometrics and time-series with Lawrence Klein, the 1980 laureate of the Nobel Memorial Prize in Economic Sciences.

Sojo has worked as a full-time professor at the ITESM Campus León, at the National Institute of Geography, Statistics and Informatics (INEGI) and served as the economic policy coordinator of Vicente Fox while he was serving as governor of Guanajuato. When Vicente Fox was sworn as president on December 1, 2000, Sojo was appointed his Chief Economic Advisor until his resignation in 2006, when he joined Felipe Calderon's transition team. From 2008 to 2015 Eduardo Sojo Garza-Aldape served as President of the Governing Board of INEGI, National Institute of Statistics and Geography. He was the co-chair of the United Nations Committee of Experts on Global Geospatial Information Management (UN-GGIM).

== See also ==
- List of Monterrey Institute of Technology and Higher Education faculty

Preceded by Sergio García de Alba	Secretary of Economy; 2006 – 2008	Succeeded by Gerardo Ruiz Mateos
