= Elenitza Canavati =

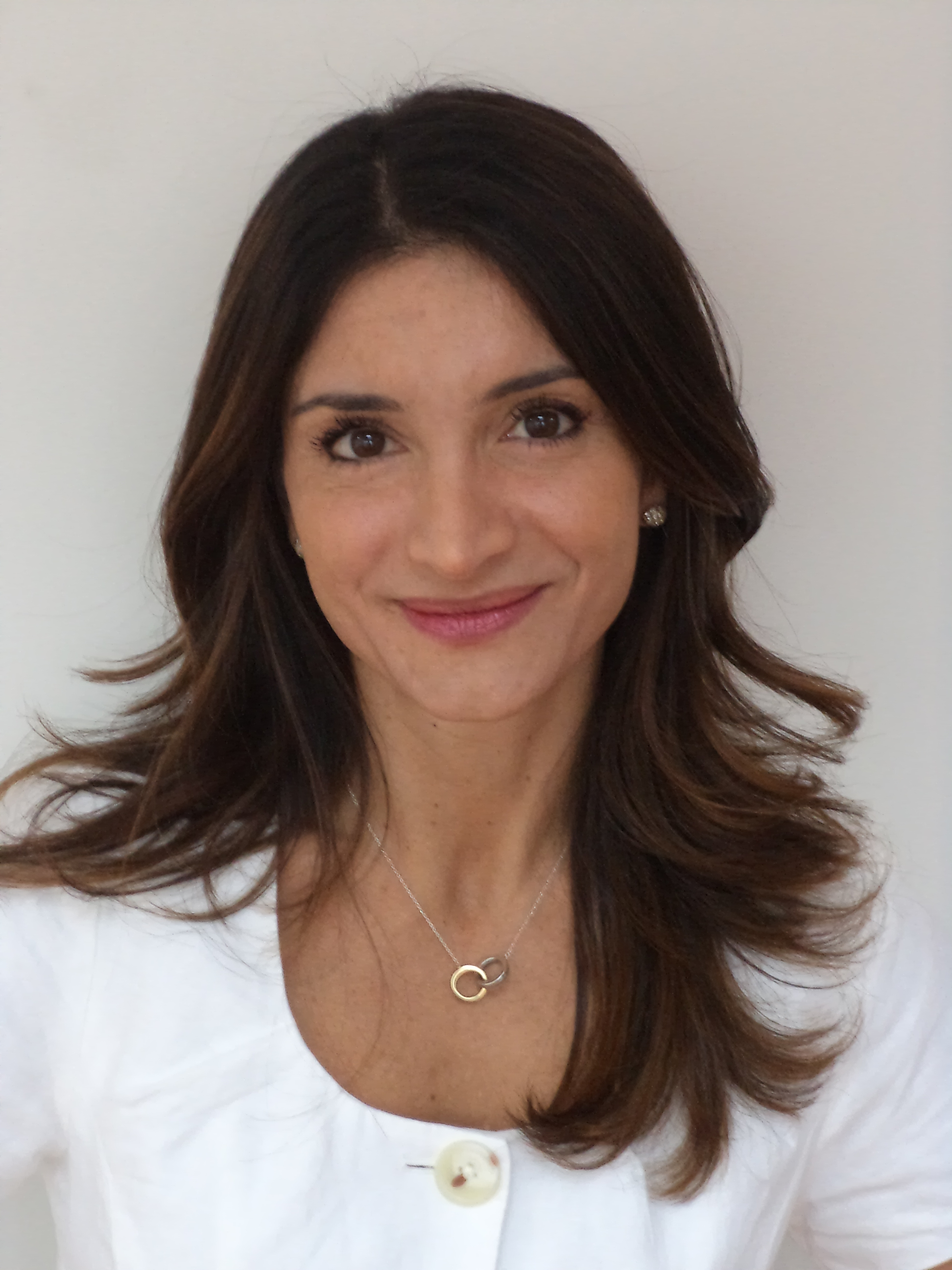

General Director of DIF Nuevo Leon
- In office 2009–2011
- Preceded by: Gabriela Calles de Guajardo
- Succeeded by: José Ramón Carrales Batres

Personal details
- Born: December 20, 1972 (age 53) Monterrey, Nuevo León, Mexico
- Party: Institutional Revolutionary Party
- Education: Iberoamericana University
- Website: www.elenicanavati.com

Elenitza Canavati Hadjopulos (born December 20, 1972, in Monterrey) is a Mexican politician. She was the state director of DIF Nuevo León.

== Education and personal life ==
She is the daughter of Ricardo Canavati Tafich. She received a bachelor's degree in international relations from the Iberoamericana University, graduating with honors.

== Partisan activity ==
In 2000, Canavati was coordinator of youth groups in Francisco Labastida Ochoa’s, the Institutional Revolutionary Party’s candidate for the presidential campaign in Nuevo León. In 2001, she was deputy secretary general of the Institutional Revolutionary Party’s Young Women's Front and since then has held the position of national councillor of Colosio Foundation.

== Professional career ==
In Fundación Unidos, AC, Canavati served as volunteer coordinator in 1999 and 2007 as director of institutional relations. In 1995 she served as special events coordinator at UNICEF Mexico.

From October 2003 to May 2011, she worked as Family's Integral Development (DIF) director in the state of Nuevo León. Within this same system, she had previously served as deputy director and volunteer coordinator from 2003 until 2006.

== Elected office ==
In 2009 she was councilwoman of Monterrey, Nuevo León.

Preceded by Gabriela Calles de Guajardo	General Director of DIF Nuevo León; 2009 – 2011	Succeeded by José Ramón Carrales Batres
