= Cantù (surname) =

Cantú (Spanish version), Cantù (Italian version), Canto (Portuguese version) Cantu (Anglicised version) is a surname of Italian/Spanish/Portuguese origin. Notable people with the surname include:

- Ana Cecilia Cantu (born 1985), Mexican figure skater
- Carlo Adolfo Cantù (1875–1942), Italian composer
- Cesare Cantù (1804–1895), Italian historian
- Egidio Torre Cantú (born 1957), Mexican politician
- Eloy Cantú Segovia (born 1952), Mexican politician
- Federico Cantú Garza (1907–1989), Mexican artist
- Guillermo Cantú (born 1968), Mexican football player
- Guillermo García Cantú (born 1960), Mexican actor
- Hector Cantú (born 1961), American writer
- Homaro Cantu (1976–2015), American chef
- Jorge Cantú (born 1982), Mexican baseball player
- Laura Martel Cantú (born 1985), Mexican politician
- Lionel Cantú (1965–2002), American sociologist
- Michele Cantú (born 1988), Mexican figure skater
- Nicolas Cantu (born 2003), American actor and YouTuber
- Norma Elia Cantú (born 1947), American writer
- Norma V. Cantu (born 1954), American lawyer
- Oscar Cantú (born 1966), American bishop
- Paty Cantú (born 1983), Mexican singer
- Rachael Cantu (born 1981), American singer-songwriter
- Rodolfo Torre Cantú (1964–2010), Mexican politician
- Rolando Cantu (born 1981), Mexican football player
- Sandra Cantu (2001–2009), American murder victim
- Vidal Cantu (born 1968), Mexican film producer
