= Mauricio Fernández Garza =

Mexican politician (1950–2025)

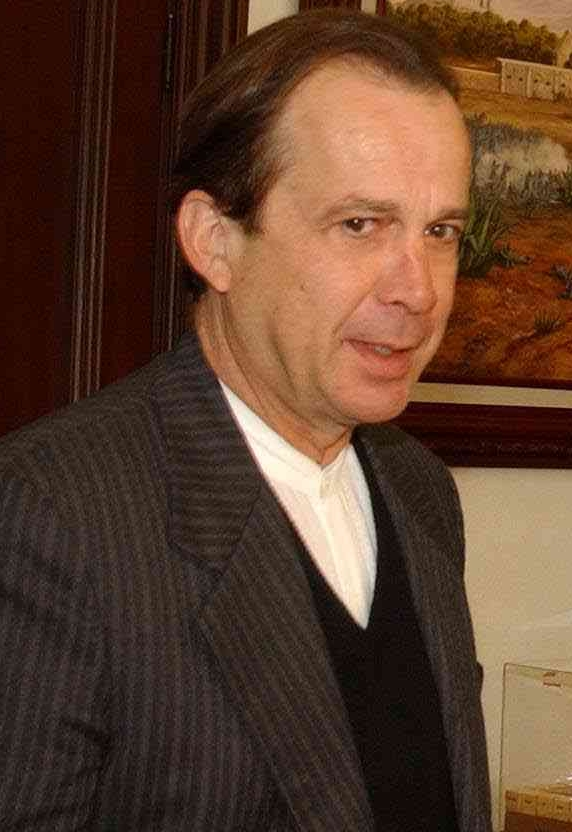
- Fernández Garza in 2002

Municipal president of San Pedro Garza García
- In office 1 October 2024 – 15 September 2025
- Preceded by: Miguel Treviño de Hoyos
- Succeeded by: Mauricio Farah Giacoman
- In office 1 November 2015 – 31 October 2018
- Preceded by: Ugo Ruiz Cortés
- Succeeded by: Miguel Treviño de Hoyos
- In office 1 November 2009 – 31 October 2012
- Preceded by: Fernando Margáin Berlanga
- Succeeded by: Ugo Ruiz Cortés
- In office 1 January 1989 – 31 December 1991
- Preceded by: Alejandro Chapa Salazar
- Succeeded by: Rogelio Sada Zambrano

Senator for Nuevo León
- In office 1 November 1994 – 31 August 2000
- Preceded by: Creation of minority senators
- Succeeded by: Ricardo Canavati Tafich

Personal details
- Born: 2 April 1950 Monterrey, Nuevo León, Mexico
- Died: 22 September 2025 (aged 75) Monterrey, Nuevo León, México
- Party: National Action Party
- Education: Purdue University

Mauricio Fernández Garza (2 April 1950 – 22 September 2025) was a Mexican politician, businessman, and collector with direct ties to the wealthy and prominent Fernández Ruiloba family, owners of PYOSA (Pigmentos Y Oxidos SA). He served as mayor of San Pedro Garza García, a former senator, and a former member of the board of directors of Grupo Alfa, a Monterrey-based chemical, food, and auto-parts producer. He is well known for his art contributions to Nuevo León.

Fernández Garza graduated with a bachelor's degree in Industrial Engineering from Purdue University (U.S.), specialized in economics at the Autonomous University of Nuevo León, and received a master's degree in business administration from the Monterrey Institute of Technology and Higher Education.

He was the founder and president of Comercializadora de Puros, Uniser (Havana, Cuba), Artesanarte, and the Museo del Ojo in García, Nuevo León. In June 2005, he sold one of his companies, Especialidades Cerveceras, S.A. (the maker of Casta premium beer), to Fomento Económico Mexicano (FEMSA), the world's second-largest Coca-Cola bottler.

Fernández Garza ran for governor of Nuevo León in 2003. He defeated former treasurer Fernando Elizondo Barragán in the National Action Party's state primaries (56.5% to 20.8%) but lost the gubernatorial election to Institutional Revolutionary Party candidate José Natividad González Parás.

He ran for mayor of San Pedro Garza García in 2009 and won the election. His administration began on 31 October 2009. His successor as mayor of San Pedro Garza García was independent candidate Miguel Treviño de Hoyos.

Fernández Garza died of mesothelioma on 22 September 2025, at the age of 75.

== Public safety ==
During his campaign, Fernández Garza focused on promoting his anti-crime policies, as the growing crime wave was a concern for many citizens of San Pedro Garza García, the wealthiest municipality in Mexico. He stated that the Beltrán Leyva drug cartel controlled the city—a claim that caused much controversy. He also mentioned that the relative peace seen in the town was due to Beltrán Leyva family members living in the city and their pacts with other cartels to keep San Pedro Garza García a "safe zone."

During his commencement speech, he mentioned that a man who had made a death threat against him had been killed in Mexico City. This happened before authorities found the body.

One of his main strategies to curb the rising crime rate was the creation of an "intelligence" force, which operated in secret and was financed by the city's wealthy businesspeople. The mayor himself called the group "El Grupo Rudo," which translates from Spanish to "The Rough Group." This group created considerable controversy, as many believed it operated illegally. The group's leader was accused of torture by one of Fernández Garza's bodyguards and was later killed by a member of another organized group. Francisco Martínez Cárdenas, son of former governor Alfonso Martínez Domínguez, was tasked with collecting money from the businesspeople. The group soon disbanded; however, many claim it still operates covertly.

In an effort to curb the rising rate of kidnappings and crime, he established a database to track all domestic workers. The goal was to track these employees, who numbered in the thousands and worked in the homes of wealthy families. One of the arguments for this database was that many kidnappings and robberies occurred due to tips from these employees. Numerous human rights groups protested the plan.

== See also ==
- Mauriciosaurus, a plesiosaur named after Mauricio Fernández Garza
- PYOSA
