= Benjamín Clariond =

Mexican politician

Benjamín Clariond Reyes-Retana is a Mexican politician affiliated with the Institutional Revolutionary Party (PRI) who has served as a federal deputy (Nuevo León's 1st district), municipal president (mayor) of Monterrey and as interim governor of the state of Nuevo León after the resignation of Sócrates Rizzo.

In 2006 he ran for municipal president (mayor) of San Pedro Garza García but lost against the PAN candidate Fernando Margáin.

Clariond is the grandson of French immigrant Jacques Antoine Clariond (also known as "Santiago Antonio Clariond") founder of Industrias Monterrey. He has served as general director of IMSATEC.

Preceded by Sócrates Rizzo	Governor of Nuevo León (interim); 1996–1997	Succeeded by Fernando Canales
Preceded by Juventino González Benavides	Municipal president of Monterrey; 1991–1994	Succeeded by Jesús Hinojosa Tijerina
