= Secretariat of Economy =

Mexican government department

Secretariat of the Economy
- Secretaría de Economía
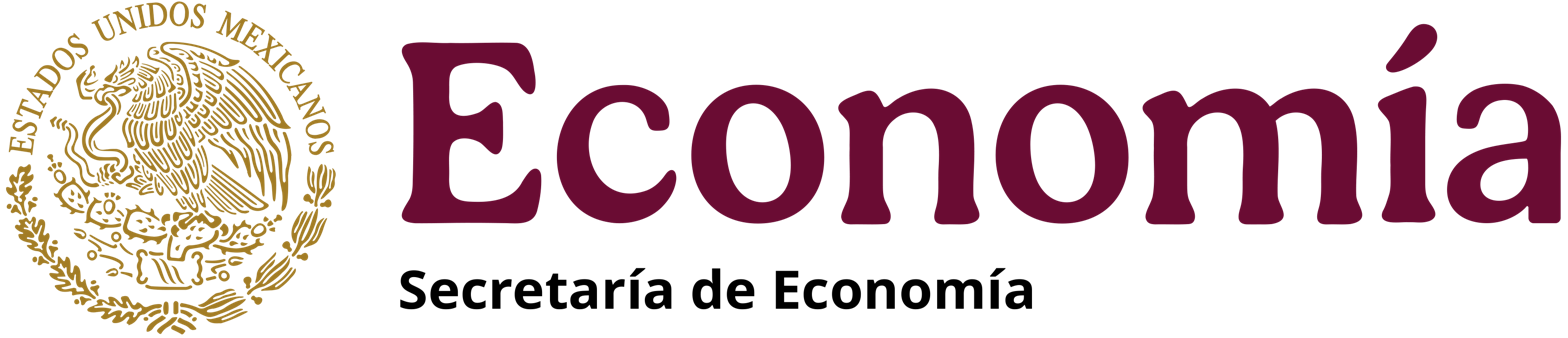

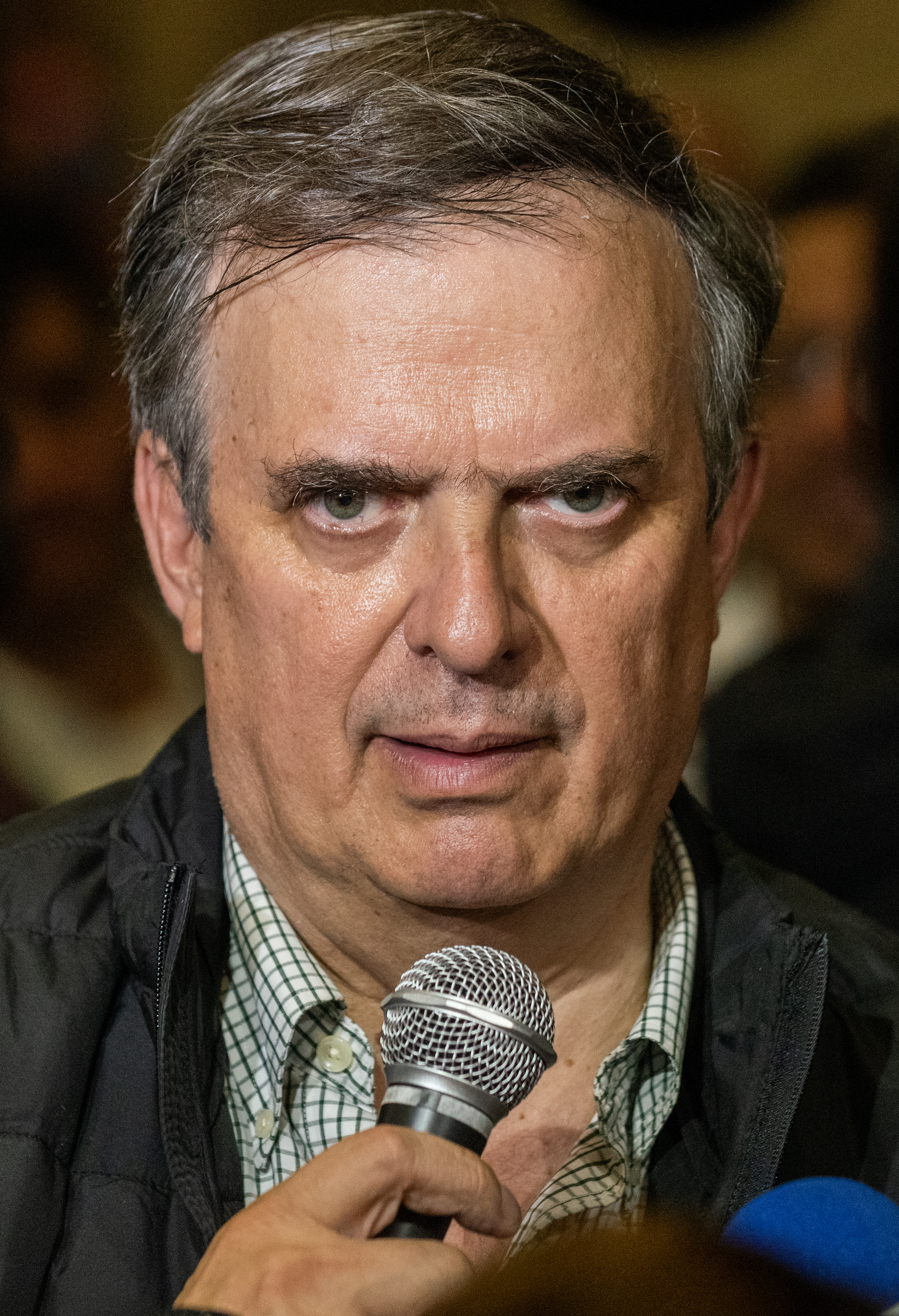
- Secretary of the Economy Marcelo Ebrard

Agency overview
- Formed: 1917
- Preceding agency: Secretariat of Commerce and Industrial Development
- Jurisdiction: Federal government of Mexico
- Headquarters: Av. Insurgentes Sur 1940, Florida, 01030 Mexico City Mexico; 19°21′9.47″N 99°11′8.46″W
- Agency executive: Marcelo Ebrard, Secretary of Economy
- Child agencies: National Metrology Centre; Federal Economic Competition Commission; Federal Commission on Regulatory Reform; Mining Development Trust Fund; Mexican Institute of Industrial Property; Federal Consumers' Attorney; ProMéxico; Mexican Geological Survey
- Website: www.gob.mx/se

In Mexico, the Secretariat of the Economy (Secretaría de Economía; abbreviated "SE") is the government department in charge of matters related to the economy. The Secretary of the Economy is a member of the federal executive cabinet appointed by the President of the Republic. Marcelo Ebrard has been the incumbent secretary since the start of President Claudia Sheinbaum's term in 2024.

Until 2000 the name of the Secretariat of the Economy was the Secretariat of Commerce and Industrial Development (Secretaría de Comercio y Fomento Industrial, Secofi) but that name was changed when Vicente Fox acceded to the presidency in 2000. The last secretary of commerce and industrial development was Herminio Blanco Mendoza.

== Secretaries ==
=== Secretaries of the Economy ===
- Marcelo Ebrard October 1, 2024 –
- Raquel Buenrostro Sánchez, October 7, 2022 – October 1, 2024
- Tatiana Clouthier, January 5, 2021 – October 6, 2022.
- Graciela Márquez Colín, December 1, 2018 – December 31, 2020.
- Ildefonso Guajardo Villarreal, December 1, 2012 – November 30, 2018.
- Bruno Ferrari García de Alba, until November 30, 2012.
- Gerardo Ruiz Mateos, 2008–2010
- Eduardo Sojo Garza-Aldape, 2006–2008
- Sergio García de Alba, 2005–2006
- Fernando Canales Clariond, 2003–2005
- Luis Ernesto Derbez, 2000–2003

=== Secretaries of Commerce and Industrial Development ===
- Herminio Blanco Mendoza, 1994–2000
- Jaime Serra Puche, 1988–1994
- Héctor Hernández Cervantes, 1982–1988

=== Secretaries of Commerce ===
- Jorge de la Vega Domínguez, 1977–1982
- Fernando Solana Morales 1976–1977
- ...

== See also ==
- Cabinet of Mexico
