= Jacques Antoine Clariond =

Mexican businessman

Santiago Antonio Clariond Desdier (born as Jaques Antoine Clariond Desdier in France) was a Mexican businessman.

Clariond founded Industrias Monterrey (IMSA) in 1936. IMSA made steel and aluminium along with batteries. In 2007 IMSA sold its steel division to Ternium. He married Maria del Consuelo Garza Gonzalez and had 2 children and 10 grandchildren. He was the grandfather of two governors of Nuevo León: Benjamín Clariond Reyes-Retana (son of Eugenio Clariond Garza) and Fernando Canales Clariond (son of Consuelo Clariond Garza).

Wife: Maria Consuelo Garza Gonzalez; Children: Eugenio Clariond Garza (1919-2004), Maria Consuelo Clariond Garza (1922-2016); Grandchildren: Eugenio, Ninfa, Maria, Benjamin, Santiago, Jose. (Clariond Reyes-Retana from Eugenio Clariond Garza). (From Consuelo Consuelo Fernando, Susana and Marcelo Canales Clariond).
