= Mexican Geological Survey =

- Servicio Geológico Mexicano
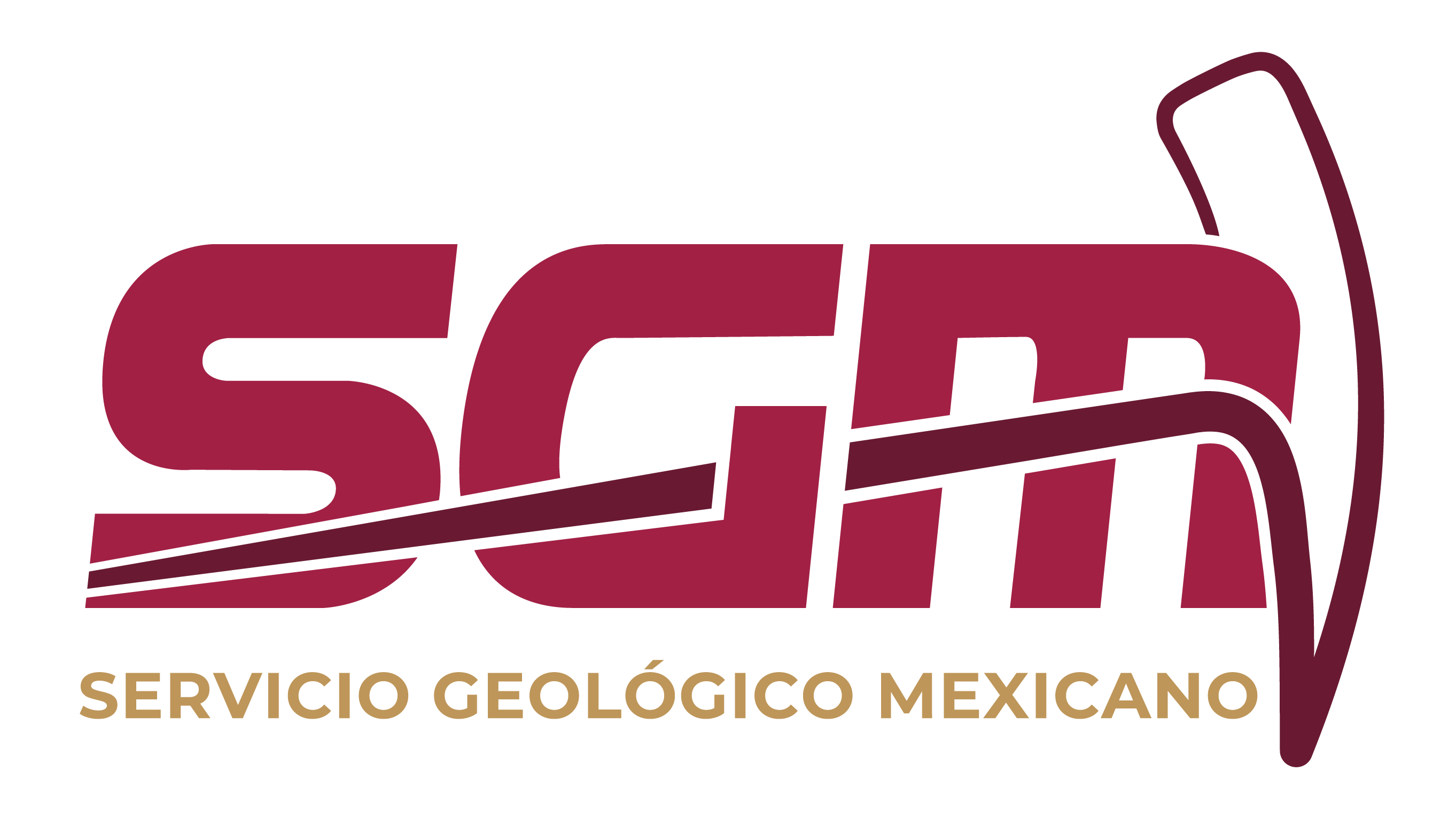

Agency overview
- Formed: 1944
- Jurisdiction: Federal government of Mexico
- Headquarters: Pachuca, Hidalgo
- Agency executive: Raul Cruz Rios, Director General
- Parent agency: Secretariat of Economy
- Website: www.gob.mx/sgm

The Mexican Geological Survey (Spanish: Servicio Geológico Mexicano) is an agency of the Mexican government; its mission includes mapping and mining consultation.

== History ==
The Mexican Geological Survey originated as the Directing Committee for Mexican Mineral Resource Research, established in 1944, which published bulletins on the exploration of mineral deposits. In 1949, the organization changed its name to the National Research Institute for Mineral Resources, and in 1955 it became the Non-Renewable Natural Resources Council. Twenty years later, in 1975, the agency became known as the Mexican Resources Council. In 2005, the title was modified to its present listing as the Mexican Geological Survey.

== Regional offices ==
The agency is divided into seven regional offices. Each office serves one or more states as listed below:

- North: Chihuahua
- Central-North: Durango, Zacatecas, Aguascalientes, Coahuila
- Northwest: Sonora, Baja California
- Central-Western: Jalisco, Michoacán, Colima, Guanajuato, Querétaro, Mexico, Federal District
- Central: San Luis Potosí, Nuevo León, Tamaulipas, Hidalgo
- South: Oaxaca, Guerrero, Morelos, Puebla, Tlaxcala, Veracruz, Tabasco, Chiapas, Campeche, Yucatán, Quintana Roo
- West: Sinaloa, Baja California Sur, Nayarit

== GeoInfoMex ==
The Mexican Geological Survey developed a database containing geological mining exploration maps at scales of 1:250,000, and 1:50,000. The database was launched in 2003 and contains information of all geological and geochemical maps. The agency hosts and maintains a publicly accessible web application, named GeoInfoMex, which allows users to query the Mexican Geological Survey database via a graphical interface. GeoInfoMex features a map of Mexico, containing levels of topics that can be searched and explored, including criterion such as: geochemistry, geophysics, metallurgy, mineral resources, and radiometric dating.
