= Sergio García de Alba =

Mexican businessman

Sergio García de Alba Zepeda is a Mexican businessman who served as Secretary of Economy in the cabinet of President Vicente Fox.

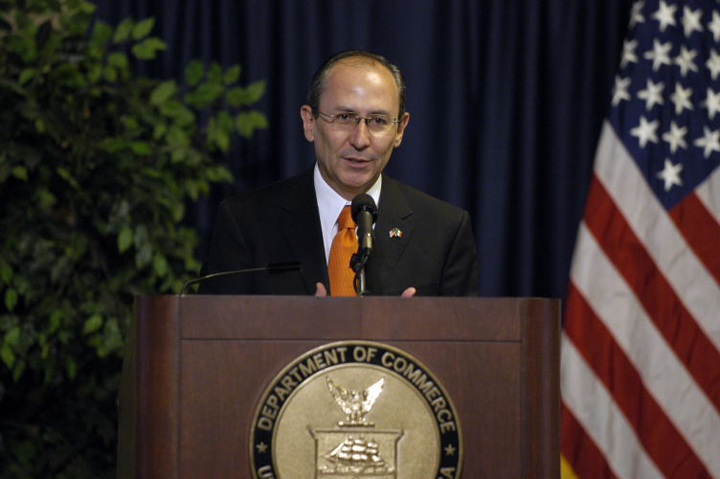
Sergio García de Alba

García de Alba holds a bachelor's degree in accounting from the ITESO. He received an MBA from the IPADE.

He served as vice-president of the CONCAMIN (Spanish acronym for Confederación de Cámaras Industriales de los Estados Unidos Mexicanos) from January 1993 to February 1995. He worked in the cabinet of Alberto Cárdenas during his Jalisco's governorship. In 2003 Fernando Canales Clariond invited him to work in the Secretary of Economy. President Vicente Fox designated him Secretary of Economy in 2005 replacing former incumbent Canales.

He took the role of President of the Institute for the Innovation, Competitiveness & Entrepreneurial Development at the Tecnologico de Monterrey (ITESM) from January 2007 to August 2009, during which time he supported the creation of Angel investment clubs at several ITESM campuses to support start-ups.

Since March 2011 he is founder, partner, & CEO of American Industries Guadalajara, which is a subsidiary company of www.aiig.com.

Preceded by Fernando Canales Clariond	Secretary of Economy (Mexico); 2005–2006	Succeeded by Eduardo Sojo Garza-Aldape
