= Lázaro Garza Ayala =

Mexican politician

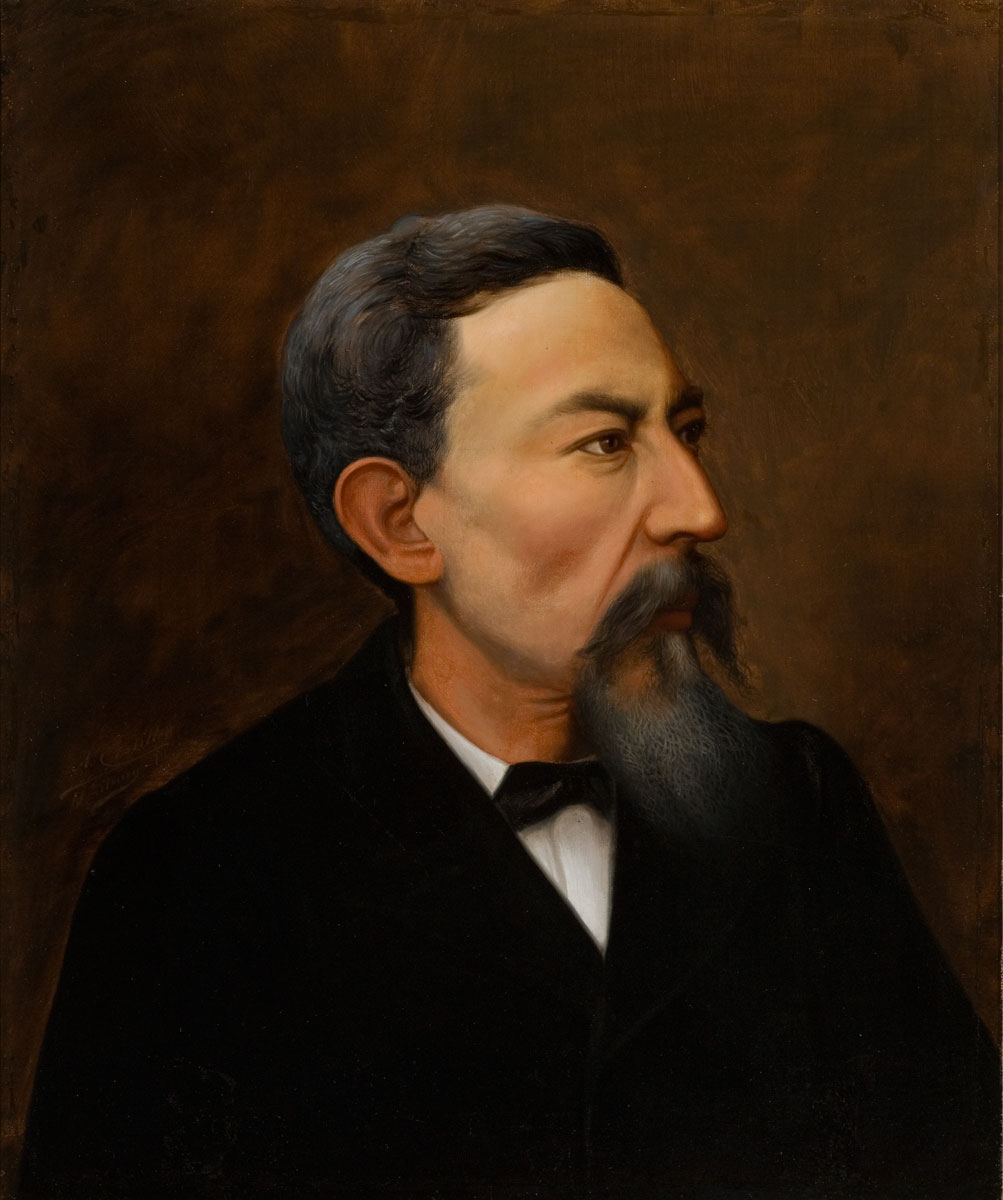
- Portrait by Antonio Costilla (1893).
- Born: José Lázaro Rodríguez García; 17 December 1830; San Pedro Garza García, Nuevo León
- Died: 3 May 1913 (aged 82); Monterrey, Nuevo León
- Citizenship: Spanish (Spain)
- Education: Roman Catholic Seminary of Monterrey

Lázaro Garza Ayala (17 December 1830 – 3 May 1913) was a Mexican politician who served several times as governor of Nuevo León during the 19th century.

== See also ==
- Governors of Nuevo León
