= Fernando Canales Clariond =

Mexican politician and businessman

Fernando Canales
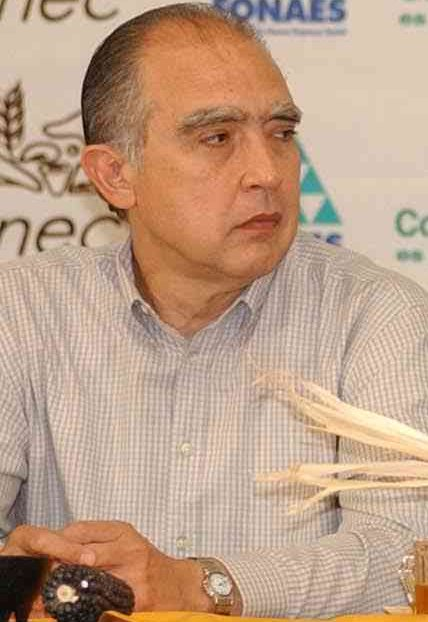

Governor of Nuevo León
- In office October 4, 1997 – January 13, 2003
- Preceded by: Benjamín Clariond
- Succeeded by: Fernando Elizondo

Deputy of the Congress of the Union for the 1st district of Nuevo León
- In office 1 September 1979 – 13 February 1982
- Preceded by: Carlota Vargas Garza
- Succeeded by: Alberto Santos de Hoyos

Personal details
- Born: July 21, 1946 (age 80) Monterrey, Nuevo León, Mexico
- Party: National Action Party
- Spouse: Ángela Stelzer
- Profession: Lawyer

Fernando de Jesús Canales Clariond (born July 21, 1946) is a Mexican politician and businessman affiliated with the National Action Party (PAN). He succeeded his cousin, Benjamín Clariond as governor of Nuevo León in 1997. He was Secretary of Economy and as Secretary of Energy in the cabinet of Vicente Fox.

Born in Monterrey, Nuevo León, Fernando Canales is the son of Fernando Canales Salinas and Consuelo Clariond. Consuelo is the daughter of Jacques Antoine Clariond ("Santiago Antonio Clariond), founder of Industrias Monterrey, and his wife María Garza. IMSA is nowadays one of the leading business groups in Latin America.

During his youth he briefly considered the Catholic priesthood but finally opted-in for a bachelor's degree in law from the Escuela Libre de Derecho. Later on he received an MBA from the Monterrey Institute of Technology and Higher Education (ITESM) and specialized in industrial relations at the Institute of Social Studies of The Hague, in the Netherlands.

In the private sector Canales has was chief executive officer and vice president of IMSA and as a member of the board in several companies in the United States, Colombia, Venezuela, Argentina, Chile and Mexico.

Politically, he is a member of the right-of-center National Action Party since 1978. He became its 1985 nominee for the Nuevo León governorship but lost against Jorge Treviño of the Revolutionary Institutional Party (PRI). Twelve years later he reattempted it and won, becoming the first governor of the PAN in the history of the state.

As a governor, Canales delivered mixed results. He left the post after being invited to the federal cabinet by President Vicente Fox and was appointed Secretary of Economy on January 15, 2003. His former treasurer, Fernando Elizondo, assumed as interim but Elizondo lost the governorship in the July 2003 elections against Natividad González Parás, Canales's leading opponent six years earlier.

Preceded by Benjamín Clariond	Governor of Nuevo León; 1997–2003	Succeeded by Fernando Elizondo
Preceded by Luis Ernesto Derbez	Secretary of Economy; 2003–2005	Succeeded by Sergio García de Alba
Preceded by Fernando Elizondo	Secretary of Energy; 2005–2006	Succeeded by Georgina Kessel
