= Ivonne Álvarez =

Mexican politician

Ivonne Liliana Álvarez
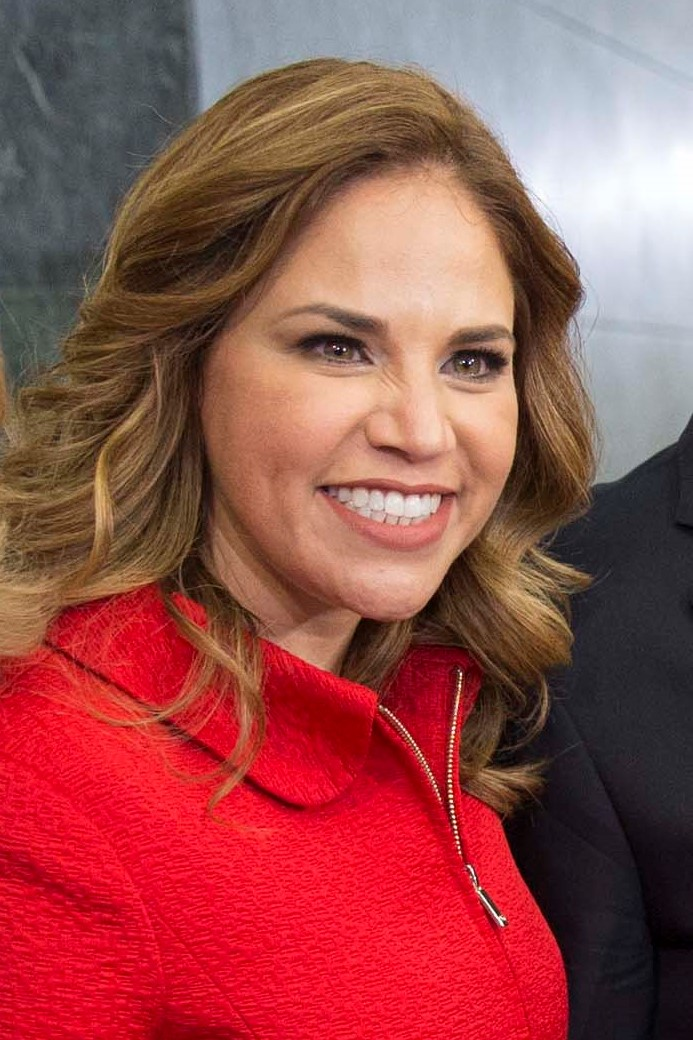
- Álvarez in 2017
- Born: 25 April 1978 (age 48); Monterrey, Nuevo León, Mexico
- Occupation: Senator
- Political party: PRI

Ivonne Liliana Álvarez García (born 25 April 1978) is a Mexican politician affiliated with the Institutional Revolutionary Party (PRI). In 2012 she was elected to serve as a Senator of the LXII Legislature of the Mexican Congress representing Nuevo León. She was also Municipal President of Guadalupe, Nuevo León, and has been widely criticized for not fulfilling her term to seek a position in the senate; Álvarez publicly promised during her campaign not to do this. In the 2018 general elections she secured a seat in the lower house of the Mexican congress.

Before becoming a politician, she worked as hostess of a television show called Música Grupera for Multimedios. In January 2015 she was designated the PRI candidate for the 2015 Nuevo León gubernatorial election.
