= Laura Martel Cantú =

Mexican politician

- Born: 5 May 1985 (age 41); Mexico City, Mexico
- Occupation: Deputy
- Political party: PVEM

Laura Ximena Martel Cantú (born 5 May 1985) is a Mexican politician affiliated with the PVEM. As of 2013 she served as Deputy of the LXII Legislature of the Mexican Congress representing the Federal Districi.
