= Javier Náñez Pro =

Mexican politician

Representative of the National Electoral Institute
- Incumbent
- Assumed office April 16, 2018

Personal details
- Born: April 9, 1991 (age 35) Monterrey, Nuevo León, Mexico
- Party: Political independent
- Education: Facultad Libre de Derecho de Monterrey
- Profession: Politician, Attorney
- Website: Facebook; Twitter

Javier Náñez Pro (born April 9, 1991) is a lawyer and Mexican politician involved in electoral political litigation in Mexico since 2015. Currently, he is the representative before the National Electoral Institute (INE) of Jaime Heliodoro Rodríguez Calderón "El Bronco", the Governor – with license from office since January 2018 – of the state of Nuevo León and Independent candidate to the Presidency of Mexico in the federal elections of 2018.

== Early life and education ==
Javier Náñez Pro was born in the city of Monterrey, Nuevo León, Mexico, on April 9, 1991, to Héctor Javier Náñez Garza and Adriana Teresa Pro Villarreal.

He graduated with honors with a bachelor's degree in law from the Faculty 'Libre de Derecho of Monterrey', in 2014. Upon graduation he traveled abroad to study social sciences at the University of Harvard.

== Political beginnings ==
After graduating, in 2015 Náñez Pro joined the campaign team of the independent candidate to the Nuevo León Gubernatorial State elections, as legal advisor to Manuel Florentino González Flores, general coordinator of the campaign, of the then independent candidate to the governorship of State of Nuevo León, Jaime Rodríguez Calderón.

On June 7, 2015, the Nuevo León State elections were held, Jaime Rodríguez Calderón won Governor of the State with 1 020 552 votes, equivalent to 48.8% of the total votes cast, and Náñez Pro was invited to be part of the governor-elect's transition team.

Javier Náñez Pro was appointed by the Governor as Legal Coordinator of the Legal Department of the State government of Nuevo León on October 6, 2015. He was subsequently appointed Technical Secretary of the General Secretary of the Nuevo León State government.

On October 16, 2017, he resigned to his public office to join the campaign of Jaime Rodríguez Calderón "El Bronco" to the Presidency of Mexico for the Mexican 2018 presidential elections and become a National Legal Coordinator for independent candidacies across Mexico.

After resigning in October 2017, he was consolidated as head of the legal team of the independent candidate "El Bronco" in his aspiration to the Presidency of Mexico in the Federal Elections of 2018.

== Presidential Election of 2018 ==
On March 15, 2018, after the National Electoral Institute (INE) declared inconsistencies in the signatures presented by "El Bronco", the candidate was refused registration as independent candidate to the Presidency of Mexico, as his attorney, Javier Náñez Pro, filed before the Superior Chamber of the Electoral Tribunal of the Federal Judicial Branch of Mexico (TEPJF) four means of challenge requesting the judicial authority to rule in favor of independent candidate and order his registration as candidate for the presidency of Mexico.

On April 9, 2018, the Electoral Tribunal of the TEPJF held a public session where they discussed the matter and by a majority of four votes in favor, they resolved and requested the immediate registration of Rodríguez Calderón as an independent candidate for the 2018 Mexican Presidencial elections.

On April 11, Náñez Pro was named by the presidential candidate as his proprietary representative before the General Council of the National Electoral Institute.

Javier Náñez Pro was signed in as representative before the Plenary of the General Council of the National Electoral Institute on April 16, 2018.
