= José Eleuterio González =

Mexican physician and philanthropist

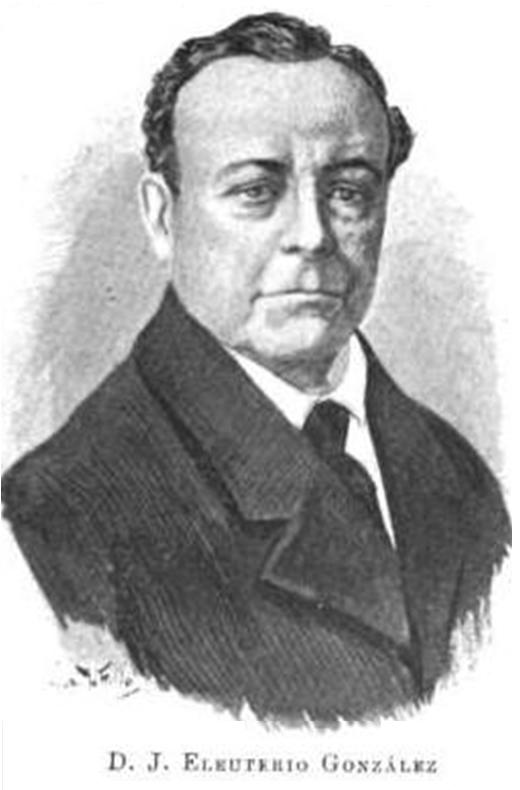
- Born: 20 February 1813; Guadalajara, Jalisco, Mexico
- Died: 4 April 1888 (aged 75); Monterrey, Nuevo León, Mexico
- Resting place: Plaza Gonzalitos, School of Medicine, UANL, Monterrey, Nuevo León, Mexico
- Other name: Gonzalitos
- Known for: Prominent figure of Nuevo León; Founder of the UANL and the Hospital Universitario José Eleuterio González
- Parent(s): Josefa Mendoza (mother); Matias González (father)

José Eleuterio González Mendoza (20 February 1813, in Guadalajara, Jalisco, Mexico – 4 April 1888), was a Mexican medical doctor and philanthropist, founder of the Autonomous University of Nuevo León (UANL) and the Hospital Universitario José Eleuterio González. His father was Matías Gonzalez, a Royalist officer, and his mother was Josefa Mendoza de Gonzalez.

== Education ==
When Gonzalez Mendoza was 5 years old his father was killed in the Mexican War of Independence. He was sent to live with one of his maternal uncles who agreed to educate him until his 12th birthday. When he turned 12 he was enrolled in the local seminar where he was taught etymology, literature, theology and philosophy. After five years in the seminar he decided to enroll in the Medical School of Guadalajara. It was there where he would have his first encounter with the medical profession while working as a teacher assistant at the San Juan de Dios hospital. While working at the hospital he met Friar Gabriel Maria Jimenéz who was from Monterrey, Nuevo León. Gonzalez Mendoza treated Jimenez during a little more than a year for Jimenez was sick with tuberculosis. During this time they became close friends and when Jimenez needed to go to San Luis Potosí for additional treatment he asked Gonzalez Mendoza to come with him. Jimenez promised him a position in a hospital in San Luis Potosí that was run by his order. Since Gonzalez uncle had died recently and his finances were in poor shape he decided to take on Jimenez offer.

== Professional career ==
He arrived in San Luis Potosí on 7 October 1830 and he found a job as second practitioner at the local hospital. He was assigned as an apprentice to Dr. Pablo Caudriello and Dr. Pascual Aranda. After some years the health of his friend Jimenez started to worsen and he agreed to accompany him to Monterrey so he could spend some time with his family,

He arrived in Monterrey 12 November 1833 and found a job as first practitioner on the Hospital del Rosario which was the only hospital in the city. This hospital was maintained by the local bishop Belaunzarán. The bishop was impressed by the devotion of the doctor towards the friar and named him interim director of the hospital when the current director had to leave the city. However this position was beyond his training and thus it forced him to learn without having an appropriate teacher.

On 1 April 1835 he started the pharmacology class due to the lack of trained pharmacists in the city. This lessons are considered the first medical education taught in the state of Nuevo León The first class consisted of only 4 students who took their lessons in the hospital's pharmacy. After a couple of years Gonzalez Mendoza graduated them out of his own accord for there was no formal medical school or university in the city.

On 6 January 1836 Gonzalez Mendoza got married with Carmen Arredondo. She was the daughter of General Joaquin Arredondo. Arredondo was military chief of the oriental internal provinces during the independence war. The marriage only lasted 6 years and they had no children. After the divorce, Gonzalez Mendoza became absorbed in his work.

On march the 8th of 1842, he finally obtained his medical degree after passing the exam given by the sanitary commission. One month after having attained his title he founded the Curso de Ciencias Médicas using the study program used by the Escuela de Medicina de Mexico. Four out of his first five students finished their medical education in other institutions elsewhere in Mexico. The fifth student, Blas María Diez finished his under Gonzalez Mendoza and became the first medical graduate of the state of Nuevo León.

In 1851 he was elected president of the local sanitary commission Two years later Gonzalez Mendoza started an obstetrics course that was open to men and women alike. In 1859 he helped found the Colegio Civil (predecessor to the UANL, the first public university in the region and was named head of the Medical School. He also founded the Hospital Civil which served the poor and was the primary practice place for the medical school.

During the first year of the medical school classes were held in a room of what used to be the bishop's house, which was seized by the government during the Reform War. The faculty consisted of 6 teachers who were responsible for 15 students. During 1865 and 1866 the school had to close due to the presence of the French army in the city. During this time classes were held clandestinely in the teachers private homes.

During the occupation by the French army, Gonzalez Mendoza met Count Liverman, an Austrian physician who was impressed by his efforts to maintain the medical school. The Count nominated him to the Order of Guadalupe, one of the Mexican Imperial Orders and Emperor Maximilian accepted to present Gonzalez Mendoza the award, however he declined the honor.

When Monterrey was retaken by the republican army under the command of general Mariano Escobedo the school was allowed to resume normal classes. Gonzalez Mendoza was in good standing with the republican army after having delivered President Benito Juárez son while he was visiting Monterrey. Because of this presidential connection he was proposed as Governor. He was elected on various occasions including once as an interim.

In his later days Gonzalez Mendoza was almost blind because of complications after a cataract surgery. He was also diagnosed with a non-specified hepatic affection in 1883. He continued his supervision of the hospital and medical school assisted by other teachers. He died on 4 April 1888 and was buried in the chapel within the Civil Hospital. His mortal remains have twice been moved. Currently he is buried in the grounds of the medical school of the Autonomous University of Nuevo León where a monument was built in his honor.
