= Rubén Zarazúa Rocha =

Mexican politician

Senator for Nuevo León
- In office 29 August 2003 – 31 August 2006
- Preceded by: Ricardo Canavati Tafich
- Succeeded by: Eloy Cantú Segovia

Personal details
- Born: 17 December 1941 (age 84) Nuevo León, Mexico
- Party: PRI
- Occupation: Politician

Rubén Zarazúa Rocha (born 17 December 1941) is a Mexican politician affiliated with the Institutional Revolutionary Party. As of 2014 he served as Senator of the LVIII and LIX Legislatures of the Mexican Congress representing Nuevo León as replacement of Jesús Ricardo Canavati Tafich.
