= Lisa Náñez =

American-born Mexican footballer (born 1977)

Personal information
- Full name: Lisa Anne Náñez Stromberg
- Date of birth: 10 March 1977 (age 49)
- Place of birth: Los Gatos, California, United States
- Position: Forward

College career
Years	Team	Apps	(Gls)
1996–1999	Santa Clara Broncos		

Senior career*
Years	Team	Apps	(Gls)
2000	California Storm		
2001–2002	San Jose CyberRays		

International career^{‡}
	Mexico	3	(0)
- * Club domestic league appearances and goals ‡ National team caps and goals as of 29 June 1999

Lisa Anne Náñez Stromberg (born 10 March 1977) is an American-born Mexican former women's international footballer who played as a forward. She was a member of the Mexico women's national football team.

Born in the United States, Nanez qualified to represent Mexico internationally through her paternal grandfather. She was part of the team at the 1999 FIFA Women's World Cup. She was also about to be part of the Mexican squad that competed in the 2004 Summer Olympics, but an administrative error left her out of that team.
