= José Natividad González Parás =

Mexican politician (born 1949)

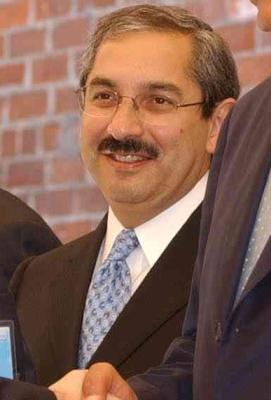

Governor of Nuevo León
- In office 4 October 2003 – 3 October 2009
- Preceded by: Fernando Elizondo Barragán
- Succeeded by: Rodrigo Medina

Member of the Chamber of Deputies for Nuevo León's 1st district
- In office 1 November 1994 – 19 July 1995
- Preceded by: José Rodolfo Treviño Salinas
- Succeeded by: Pedro Morales Somohano

Personal details
- Born: 30 March 1949 (age 76) Monterrey, Nuevo León
- Party: Institutional Revolutionary Party
- Spouse: Cristina Maiz
- Profession: Lawyer

José Natividad González Parás (born March 30, 1949) is a Mexican politician affiliated with the Institutional Revolutionary Party (PRI). He is a former federal deputy and former governor of Nuevo León (2003–2009). He is also married to Cristina Maiz.

Born in Monterrey, Nuevo León, González Parás is the son of José Natividad González González and María Cristina Parás Barocio and a direct descendant of José María Parás, governor of the state (1825–1827 and 1848–1850). He received a bachelor's degree in law from the Autonomous University of Nuevo León, a master's degree in public administration from the French Public Administration International Institute (nowadays École nationale d'administration, 1973) and a doctorate in political sciences from the University of Paris I (Panthéon-Sorbonne).

He joined the Institutional Revolutionary Party in 1967 and has taught several courses at El Colegio de México, at the National Autonomous University of Mexico (UNAM) and at the Autonomous University of Nuevo León (UANL). From 1985 until 1991 he served as the state general secretary of Nuevo León and for a few years he served as undersecretary of political development at the Secretariat of the Interior during the Ernesto Zedillo administration.

In 1997 he ran for governor and lost against Fernando Canales Clariond, a wealthy businessman of the conservative National Action Party (PAN). Six years later he reattempted it and won by a clear margin over his closest opponent, Mauricio Fernández Garza.

== Governor of Nuevo León ==
Following Barcelona's example, the Governor sought and gained for Monterrey the responsibility of hosting the 2007 Universal Forum of Cultures, an event that the city of Barcelona had used to renew its own infrastructure before. As parts of the works for the Forum, the Governor ordered an expansion of the metropolitan subway system, the remodeling of the city's main square, numerous infrastructure works, and other investments. The cost of these was financed by creating new debt mechanisms. Among them, the Transit Control Administration (Instituto de Control Vehicular), in charge of licensing plates and licensing drivers in the State, was made autonomous so that its income could be given as an insurance to bonds. The Monterrey - Cadereyta toll highway was turned into the "Nuevo León State Highway Network" (Red Estatal de Carreteras) so that its income and its assets be used to back more bonds. The State Government has argued, however, that the liabilities of decentralized organisms cannot be considered debt, and therefore the State's debt has been reduced. This argument is done despite the fact the decentralized organisms that have assumed debt where decentralized during this administration, and the opposition has accused the government of decentralizing with the sole purpose of acquiring debt. In fact, the issue sparked a controversy that had to be resolved by Mexico's Supreme Court. The financing through debt incurred by the State has risen so much that Nuevo León, the third richest state in the country, became the 4th most leveraged State in Mexico.

Additionally, the rising climate of insecurity, and drug-related assassinations in Mexico have made investors cautious about financial risk in Nuevo León as in other states. In April 2007, the US Department of State issued a warning for its citizens travelling to several states in Mexico including Nuevo León, which had accumulated 50 drug related assassinations in 2007.

In the presidential election of 2006, the PAN candidate won in all of the Northern states and the PRD candidate won in most of the central, south and southeastern states. The opposition PAN won the State Congress, marking the first time that the State Legislature will be ruled by an opposition party to the State Executive. Most of the municipalities in the State were also won by the opposition.

González has fostered the creation of 40 research centers in the state in his first four years as governor. González is currently negotiating the construction of an underground suburban train in the Monterrey area.

Under the González administration Nuevo León is the fourth state in property tax revenue in the country and is the second in GDP (after the Federal District) with 7.3% of the national GDP. The state has had a GDP growth of no less than 4.1% each year since González took office in 2003.

Preceded by Fernando Elizondo	Governor of Nuevo León	Succeeded by Rodrigo Medina
