= Fernando Elizondo Barragán =

Mexican politician and lawyer

Fernando Elizondo
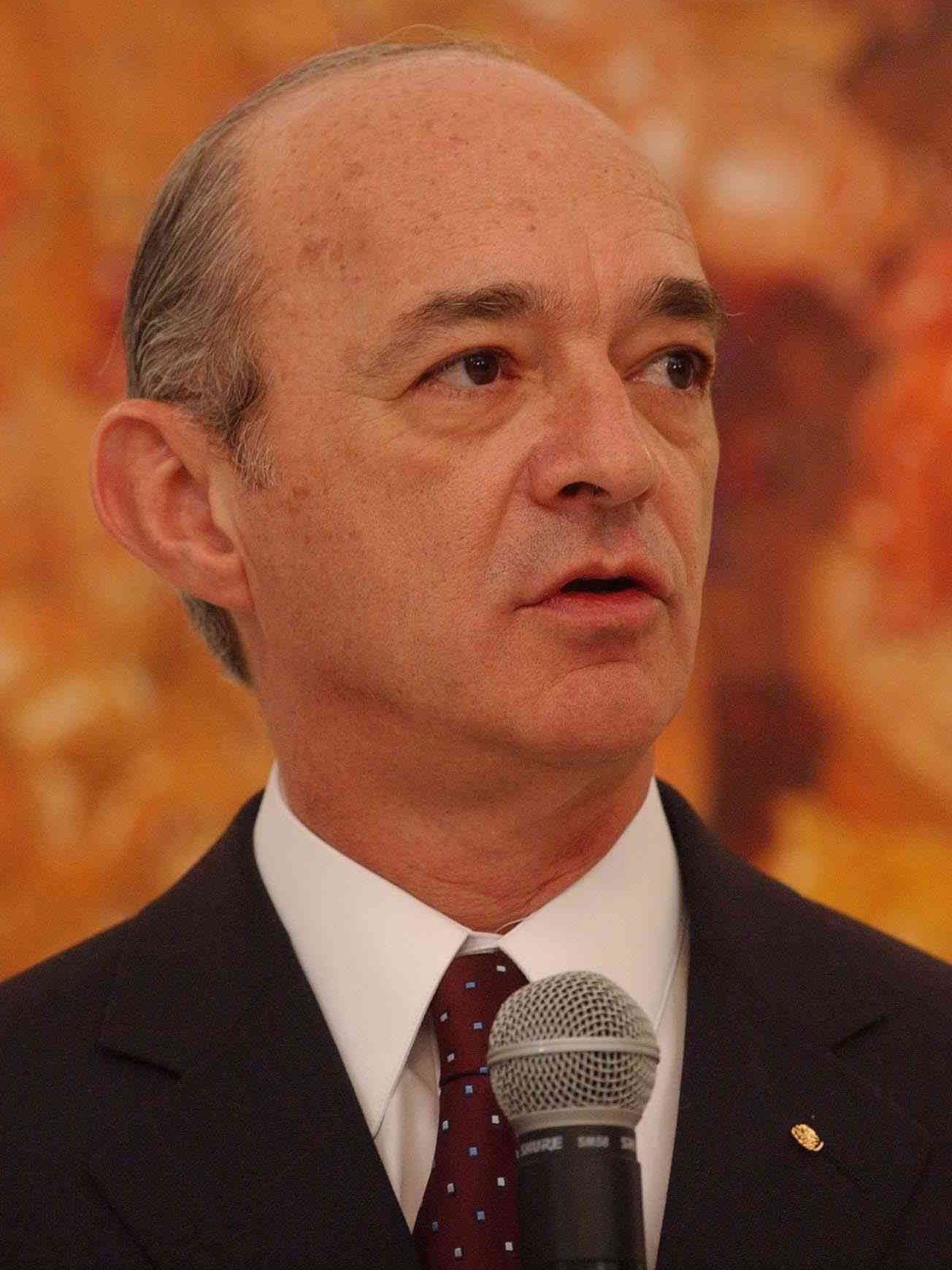

Secretary of Energy
- In office 1 June 2004 – 28 September 2005
- President: Vicente Fox
- Preceded by: Felipe Calderón
- Succeeded by: Fernando Canales Clariond

Governor of Nuevo León
- Acting
- In office 13 January 2003 – 3 October 2003
- Preceded by: Fernando Canales Clariond
- Succeeded by: Natividad González Parás

Personal details
- Born: 6 January 1949 (age 77) Monterrey, Nuevo León, Mexico
- Party: National Action Party (2001–2014); Citizens' Movement (2014–present)
- Spouse: Verónica Ortiz (m. 1987)
- Occupation: Lawyer

Fernando Elizondo Barragán (6 January 1949, Monterrey, Nuevo León) is a Mexican politician, lawyer, and businessperson previously affiliated with the National Action Party. He was the interim governor of Nuevo León (2003), former Secretary of Energy in the cabinet of President Vicente Fox, and Nuevo León senator in the LX and LXI legislatures. Fernando Elizondo was born into an upper-class family formed by a prominent local politician, Eduardo Elizondo Lozano, and Laura Barragán. He completed most of his basic studies in Catholic institutions and graduated with honors from the Autonomous University of Nuevo León with a degree in law. In 1971 he received an MBA from the Monterrey Institute of Technology and Higher Education.

He started as a lawyer in a well-known law firm founded by his father and in 1980 took over the legal department of Hojalata y Lámina, S.A. (HYLSA), a renowned corporation in the metal industry. Later on he presided over several business chambers, including the local chapter of the National Chamber of Commerce (CANACO) until 1995, when he led the financial restructuring of Grupo Salinas y Rocha, a national chain of furniture and department stores. He left the company in August 1997.

== Political career ==
In October 1997 Fernando Canales, a conservative businessman, was sworn as the first National Action Party (PAN) governor in the history of Nuevo León and Elizondo was invited to the cabinet. He served as the State Secretary of Finance and General Treasurer from 1997 until March 2002, when he left the post to compete for the PAN candidacy to the state governorship, which he lost against Mauricio Fernández Garza, a wealthy cultural promoter and former senator.

In January 2003 Canales resigned as governor to assume the Secretariat of Energy in the cabinet of Vicente Fox. A few days later, the Congress of Nuevo León appointed Elizondo Barragán as an interim. His administration greatly improved the public perception of the conservative government but not enough to reverse the voters animosity towards his party, a tendency largely inherited from the Canales administration. On 2 January 2003 Natividad González Parás, a leading opponent to his predecessor during the 1997 elections regained the governorship for the Institutional Revolutionary Party (PRI).

After leaving the governorship, Elizondo served briefly as a presidential liaison in several national tax conventions. On 1 June 2004 he was appointed Secretary of Energy by President Fox substituting Felipe Calderón, who resigned to compete for the PAN presidential candidacy in the 2006 Mexican Federal Election. As a Federal secretary, Elizondo faced a fierce opposition by the trade unions and the opposition parties in Congress to a constitutional amendment that would allow private investment and competition in the national oil and electricity markets.

He was elected Senator of the Republic in the 2006 Mexican Federal Election.

Political offices
Preceded by Felipe Calderón	Secretary of Energy; 2004–2005	Succeeded by Fernando Canales
Preceded by Fernando Canales	Governor of Nuevo León (interim); 2003	Succeeded by Natividad González Parás
