= Governor of Nuevo León =

Chief executive of the Mexican state of Nuevo León

- Gobernador de Nuevo León

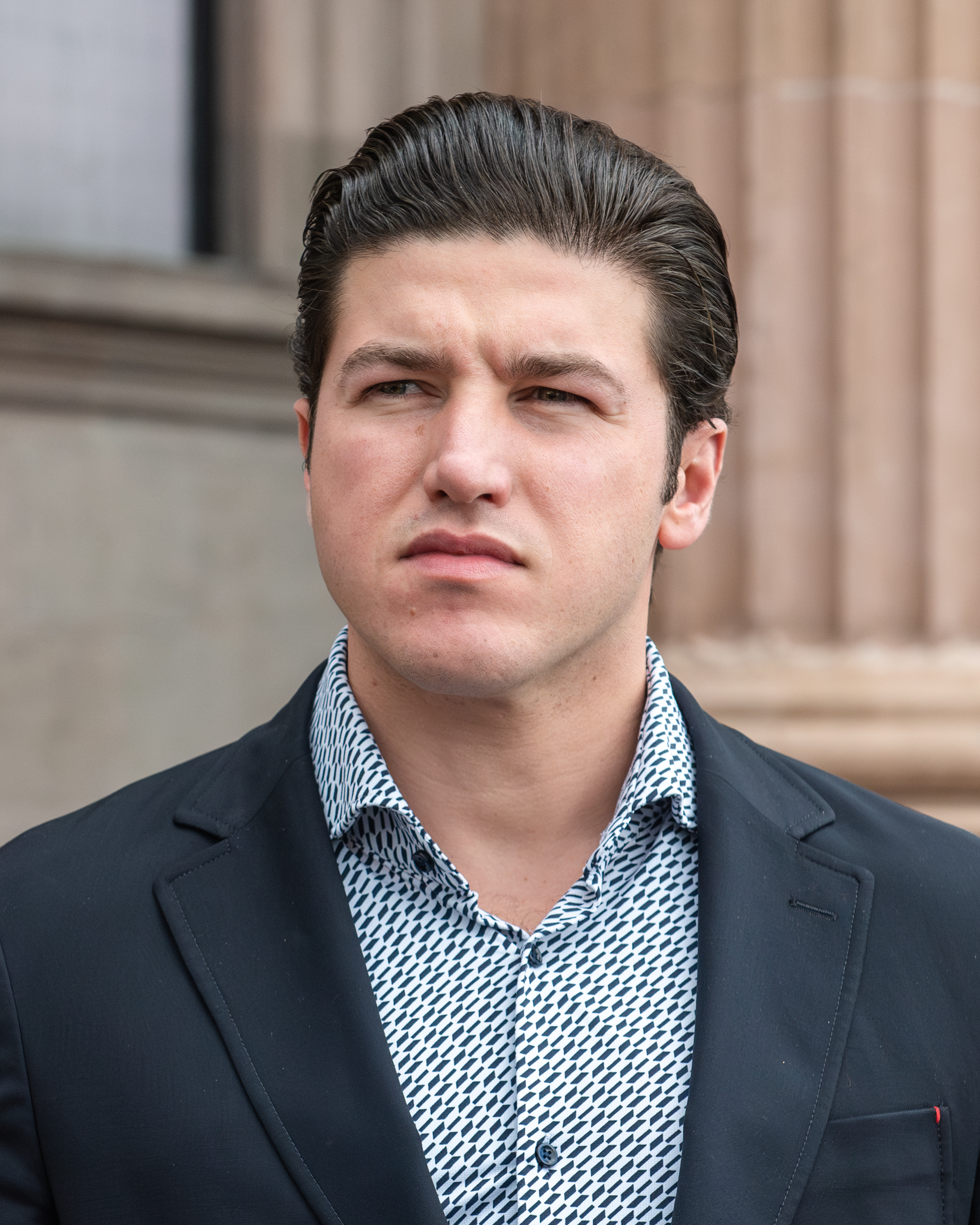
- Incumbent; Samuel García Sepulveda since 2 December 2023
- Seat: Monterrey, Nuevo León
- Appointer: Popular vote
- Term length: Six years, non-renewable
- Inaugural holder: José María Parás y Ballesteros
- Formation: 1824
- Website: nl.gob.mx/es/gobernador

The Mexican state of Nuevo León has been governed by more than a hundred individuals in its history, who have had various titles and degrees of responsibility depending on the prevailing political regime of the time.

Under the current regime, executive power rests in a governor, who is directly elected by the citizens, using a secret ballot, to a six-year term with no possibility of reelection. The position is open only to a Mexican citizen by birth, at least 30 years old with at least five years of residency in Nuevo León.

The governor's term begins on October 4 and finishes six years later on October 3. Elections occur 3 years before/after presidential elections.

== Gubernatorial elections and term of office ==
=== Qualifications ===
Article 118 of the Constitution of Nuevo León sets qualifications for candidates for governor of Nuevo León:

- Must be a Mexican citizen by birth, in full exercise of rights.
- Must be native to Nuevo León or have at least five years of prior residence.
- Must be at least 30 years old on election day.
- Cannot belong to the clergy or be a minister of any religion.
- Military members must have left active service at least six months before the election.
- Certain public officials (secretaries, legislators, magistrates, councilors, prosecutors, mayors) are ineligible unless they resign or take a leave of absence at least 100 days before the election.

=== Election ===
Governors of Nuevo León are elected by plurality vote to a single six-year term, with no possibility of reelection. The governor takes office on 4 October of the election year, with elections held three years before or after the corresponding presidential election.

=== Recall ===
Article 60 of the Constitution of Nuevo León establishes the mechanism for a recall election of the governor, which is organized by the State Electoral Institute upon citizen request. A recall may be initiated once during the three months following the governor's third year in office, provided it is supported by at least ten percent of registered voters across a majority of municipalities. For the result to be binding, turnout must reach at least forty percent of the electorate, with removal requiring an absolute majority of votes cast. In the event of removal, the President of the Congress of Nuevo León serves provisionally as governor until the legislature appoints a successor.

== List of governors ==
=== Nuevo Reino de León ===
- Luis de Carvajal y de la Cueva, 1580–1588
- Diego de Montemayor, 1588–1610
- Diego de Montemayor (el mozo), 1610–1611
- Diego Rodríguez, 1612–1614
- Agustín de Zavala, 1614–1625
- Martín de Zavala, 1625–1664
- León de Alza, 1665–1667
- Nicolás de Azcárraga, 1667–1676
- Domingo de Prudena, 1676–1681
- Blas de la Garza y Falcón, 1681
- Domingo de Videgaray y Zarza, 1681
- Francisco de la Calancha y Valenzuela, 1681
- Blas de la Garza Falcón, 1681
- Juan de Echeverría, 1681–1682
- Diego de Villarreal, 1682–1683
- Alonso de León, 1683–1684
- Antonio de Echevérez y Subiza, 1684–1687
- Francisco Cuervo y Valdés, 1687–1688
- Pedro Fernández de la Ventosa, 1688–1693
- Juan Pérez de Merino, 1693–1698
- Juan Francisco de Vergara y Mendoza 1698–1703
- Francisco Báez Treviño, 1703–1705
- Gregorio de Salinas Varona, 1705–1707
- Cipriano García de Pruneda, 1707–1708
- Luis García de Pruneda 1708–1710
- Francisco Mier y Torre, 1710–1714
- Francisco Báez Treviño 1714–1718
- Juan Ignacio Flores Mogollon 1718
- Francisco de Barbadillo y Vitoria, 1719–1723
- Juan José de Arriaga y Brambila, 1723–1725
- Pedro de Sarabia Cortés, 1725–1729
- Bernardino de Meneses Monroy y Mendoza, 1730–1731
- Juan Antonio Fernández de Jáuregui y Urrutia, 1731–1740
- Pedro del Barrio Junco y Espriella, 1740–1746
- Vicente Bueno de Borbolla, 1746–1751
- Pedro del Barrio Junco y Espriella, 1752–1757
- Juan Manuel Muñoz de Villavicencio, 1757–1762
- Carlos de Velasco, 1762–1764
- Ignacio Ussel y Guimbarda, 1764–1772
- Francisco de Echegaray, 1772–1773
- Melchor Vidal de Lorca y Villena, 1773
- Vicente González de Santianes, 1773–1788
- Manuel Bahamonde y Villamil, 1788–1795
- Simón de Herrera y Leyva, 1795–1810
- Manuel de Santa María, 1810–1811
- José Santiago Villarreal, 1811
- Blas José Gómez de Castro, 1811–1813
- Ramón Díaz Bustamante, 1813
- José Antonio Mujica, 1814
- Froilán de Mier y Noguera, 1815
- Francisco Bruno Barreda, 1816 and 1818–1821
- Bernardo Villamil, 1817–1818

=== Independent Mexico ===
- Juan de Echandía 1822 (Note: State of Nuevo León established)
- Francisco de Mier y Noriega, 1823
- José Antonio Rodríguez, 1824
- José María Parás, 1825–1827
- Manuel Gómez Castro, 1827–1829
- Joaquín García, 1829–1833
- Manuel Gómez Castro, 1833
- Manuel María de Llano, 1833–1834
- Juan Nepomuceno de la Garza y Evía, 1835–1837 (Note: The state was demoted to a Department in 1835.)
- Joaquín García, 1837–1839
- Manuel María de Llano, 1839–1845 (Note: The unrecognized Republic of the Rio Grande, including part of Nuevo León, was briefly established in 1840.)
- José María Ortega, 1841
- Juan Nepomuceno de la Garza y Evía, 1845–1846
- Pedro de Ampudia, 1846 (Note: The North American Intervention and occupation was 1846-1848.)
- José María Parás, 1848–1850
- Pedro de Ampudia, 1853–1854
- Pedro José García, 1850–1851
- Agapito García Dávila, 1851–1853
- Mariano Morret, 1854
- Jerónimo Cardona, 1854–1855
- Santiago Vidaurri, 1855–1859 (Note: Statehood was restored with the Plan de Monterrey. Coahuila was annexed and the Republic of the Sierra Madre was declared in 1856.)
- José Silvestre Aramberri, 1859
- Santiago Vidaurri, 1860–1864 (Note: The separatists were defeated and Nuevo León was reincorporated as a Mexican state in 1864.)

=== French intervention ===
- Jesús María Benítez y Pinillos, 1864
- Mariano Escobedo, 1865
- Simón de la Garza Melo, 1865
- Mariano Escobedo, 1866
- Manuel Z. Gómez, 1866–1867

=== Restored Republic ===
- Jerónimo Treviño, 1867–1869
- Simón de la Garza Melo, 1869
- Lázaro Garza Ayala, 1869
- José Eleuterio González, 1870
- Jerónimo Treviño; 1871, 1877 and 1913
- Genaro Garza García, 1871
- Lázaro Garza Ayala, 1872
- Narciso Dávila, 1872
- José Eleuterio González, 1872–1873
- Ramón Treviño, 1873
- José Eleuterio González, 1874
- Ramón Treviño, 1874
- Francisco González Doria, 1874
- Carlos Fuero, 1875–1876
- Narciso Dávila, 1876
- Canuto García, 1876
- Genaro Garza García 1876

=== Porfiriato ===
- Genaro Garza García, 1877–1879
- Viviano L. Villareal, 1879–1881
- Genaro Garza García, 1881–1883
- Canuto García, 1883–1885
- Genaro Garza García, 1885
- Bernardo Reyes; 1885–1887, 1889–1900, and 1903–1909
- Lázaro Garza Ayala, 1887–1889
- Pedro Benítez Leal, 1900–1902
- José María Mier, 1909–1910

=== Mexican Revolution ===
- Leobardo Chapa, 1910–1911
- Viviano L. Villarreal, 1911–1913
- Salomé Botello, 1913–1914
- Antonio de la Paz Guerra, 1914
- Antonio Villarreal, 1914–1915
- Rafael Cepeda de la Fuente, 1915
- Felipe Ángeles, 1915
- Raúl Madero, 1915
- Ildefonso V. Vázquez, 1915
- Pablo A. de la Garza, 1915 and 1916
- Diódoro de la Garza, 1916
- Alfredo Recaut, 1917

Governor	Term in office	Election	Party
Nicéforo Zambrano (1861–1940)	1 July 1917 – 3 October 1919	1917	
José E. Santos (1889–1953)	4 October 1919 – 13 May 1920 (removed) (Note: Removed after the triumph of the Plan of Agua Prieta, which unrecognized the government of Nuevo León along with other state governments.)	1919	
Porfirio G. González (1885–1928); Interim	13 May 1920 – 5 February 1921	Imposed by the Plan of Agua Prieta	
Juan M. García (1885–1957)	5 February 1921 – 4 April 1922 (removed from office)	1921	
Ramiro Tamez (1889–1976); Substitute	4 April 1922 – 3 October 1923	Designated by the Congress of Nuevo León	
Alfredo Pérez Garza (1874–1954)	4 October 1923 (deposed) (Note: Deposed by federal forces who recognized Anastasio Treviño Martínez as provisional governor instead.)	1923; Self-proclaimed, disputed (Note: Claimed governorship following the annulled 1923 election. The Monterrey city council voted 8–7 to recognize the elected 40th Legislature of the Congress of Nuevo León, which had declared Pérez the elected governor and initially controlled the Government Palace.)	
Anastasio Treviño Martínez (1870–1943); Provisional	4 October 1923 – 25 December 1923	Designated by the Superior Court of Justice of Nuevo León	
Porfirio G. González (1885–1928)	25 December 1923 – 16 October 1925 (removed from office)	Designated by the Congress of Nuevo León (Note: Under pressure from González, provisional governor Treviño Martínez recognized González's self-proclaimed 40th Legislature, which convened on 25 December 1923, and immediately designated González as constitutional governor for the remainder of the term ending 4 October 1927.)	
Jerónimo Siller (1880–1962); Interim	16 October 1925 – 3 October 1927	Designated by the Congress of Nuevo León	

=== Modern Nuevo León (1927–present) ===
Governor	Term in office	Election	Party
Aarón Sáenz Garza (1891–1983)	4 October 1927 – 27 March 1928 (leave of absence) (Note: Took a leave of absence to participate in Álvaro Obregón’s re-election campaign.)	1927	
José Benítez Martínez (1891–1954); Interim	27 March 1928 – 14 August 1928	Designated by the Congress of Nuevo León	
Aarón Sáenz Garza (1891–1983)	14 August 1928 – 6 November 1928 (leave of absence) (Note: Took a leave of absence in order to seek the presidential nomination of the National Revolutionary Party for the 1929 Mexican presidential election.)	—	
José Benítez Martínez (1891–1954); Interim	6 November 1928 – 25 March 1929	Designated by the Congress of Nuevo León	
Aarón Sáenz Garza (1891–1983)	25 March 1929 – 26 April 1929 (leave of absence)	—	National Revolutionary Party
Plutarco Elías Calles Chacón (1901–1976); Interim	26 April 1929 – 2 June 1929	Designated by the Congress of Nuevo León	National Revolutionary Party
Generoso Chapa Garza (1901–1969); Interim	2 June 1929 – 12 June 1929	Designated by the Congress of Nuevo León	National Revolutionary Party
Aarón Sáenz Garza (1891–1983)	12 June 1929 – 3 February 1930 (leave of absence) (Note: Took a leave of absence to accept an appointment as Secretary of Public Education in the cabinet of President Pascual Ortiz Rubio.)	—	National Revolutionary Party
José Benítez Martínez (1891–1954); Interim	3 February 1930 – 12 September 1931	Designated by the Congress of Nuevo León	National Revolutionary Party
Aarón Sáenz Garza (1891–1983)	12 September 1931 – 3 October 1931	—	National Revolutionary Party
Francisco A. Cárdenas (1879–1943)	4 October 1931 – 27 December 1933 (resigned) (Note: Resigned due to poor health.)	1931	National Revolutionary Party
Pablo Quiroga Treviño (1903–1987); Substitute	27 December 1933 – 3 October 1935	Designated by the Congress of Nuevo León	National Revolutionary Party
Gregorio Morales Sánchez (1885–1962); Provisional	4 October 1935 – 1 May 1936	Designated by the Superior Court of Justice of Nuevo León	National Revolutionary Party
Anacleto Guerrero Guajardo (1892–1980)	1 May 1936 – 3 October 1939	1936	National Revolutionary Party
Bonifacio Salinas Leal (1900–1982)	4 October 1939 – 3 October 1943	1939	Party of the Mexican Revolution
Arturo B. de la Garza (1905–1952)	4 October 1943 – 3 October 1949	1943	Party of the Mexican Revolution
Ignacio Morones Prieto (1899–1974)	4 October 1949 – 1 December 1952 (resigned) (Note: Resigned to accept an appointment as Secretary of Health and Assistance in the cabinet of President Adolfo Ruiz Cortines.)	1949	Institutional Revolutionary Party
José S. Vivanco (1899–1979); Substitute	5 December 1952 – 3 October 1955	Designated by the Congress of Nuevo León	Institutional Revolutionary Party
Raúl Rangel Frías (1913–1993)	4 October 1955 – 3 October 1961	1955	Institutional Revolutionary Party
Eduardo Livas Villarreal (1911–1991)	4 October 1961 – 3 October 1967	1961	Institutional Revolutionary Party
Eduardo Ángel Elizondo Lozano (1922–2005)	4 October 1967 – 5 June 1971 (resigned) (Note: Resigned following strikes and conflicts triggered by a new Organic Law for the University of Nuevo León, which was opposed by students and faculty.)	1967	Institutional Revolutionary Party
Luis M. Farías (1920–1999); Substitute	5 June 1971 – 31 July 1973	Designated by the Congress of Nuevo León	Institutional Revolutionary Party
Pedro Zorrilla Martínez (1933–1999)	1 August 1973 – 31 July 1979	1973	Institutional Revolutionary Party
Alfonso Martínez Domínguez (1920–2002)	1 August 1979 – 31 July 1985	1979	Institutional Revolutionary Party
Jorge Alonso Treviño (1935–2026)	1 August 1985 – 31 July 1991	1985	Institutional Revolutionary Party
Sócrates Rizzo García (b. 1945)	1 August 1991 – 17 April 1996 (resigned)	1991	Institutional Revolutionary Party
Benjamín Clariond (b. 1948); Substitute	18 April 1996 – 3 October 1997	Designated by the Congress of Nuevo León	Institutional Revolutionary Party
Fernando Canales Clariond (b. 1946)	4 October 1997 – 13 January 2003 (resigned) (Note: Resigned to accept an appointment as Secretary of Economy in the cabinet of President Vicente Fox.)	1997	National Action Party
Fernando Elizondo Barragán (b. 1949); Substitute	13 January 2003 – 3 October 2003	Designated by the Congress of Nuevo León	National Action Party
José Natividad González Parás (b. 1949)	4 October 2003 – 3 October 2009	2003	Institutional Revolutionary Party
Rodrigo Medina de la Cruz (b. 1972)	4 October 2009 – 3 October 2015	2009	Institutional Revolutionary Party
Jaime Rodríguez Calderón (b. 1957)	4 October 2015 – 31 December 2017 (leave of absence)	2015	Independent
Manuel Florentino González Flores (b. 1957); Interim	1 January 2018 – 2 July 2018	Designated by the Congress of Nuevo León	Independent
Jaime Rodríguez Calderón (b. 1957)	2 July 2018 – 3 October 2021	—	Independent
Samuel García (b. 1987)	4 October 2021 – 1 December 2023 (leave of absence)	2021	Citizens' Movement
Luis Enrique Orozco (b. 1978); Interim	2 December 2023 – 4 December 2023	Designated by the Congress of Nuevo León	Independent
Samuel García (b. 1987)	4 December 2023 – Incumbent	—	Citizens' Movement

== Sources ==
- This article originated as a translation of the corresponding article in the Spanish-language Wikipedia. That, in turn, gives the following sources:
  - La Enciclopedia de los Municipios de México: Nuevo León
  - Israel Cavazos: Breve historia de Nuevo León
