= 2024 Mexican Senate election =

- 2 June 2024

All 128 seats of the Senate of the Republic 65 seats needed for a majority
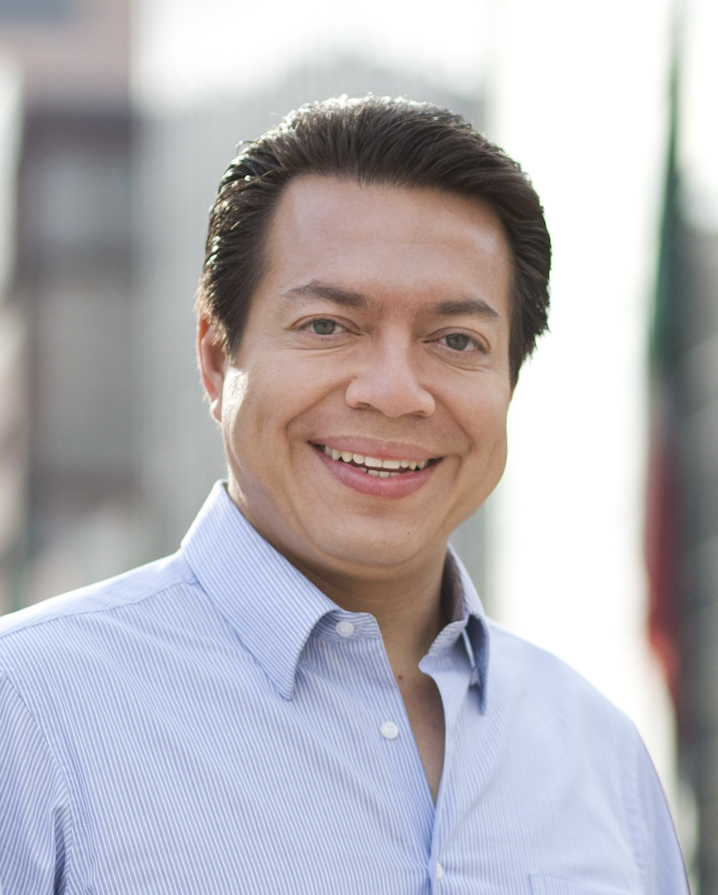

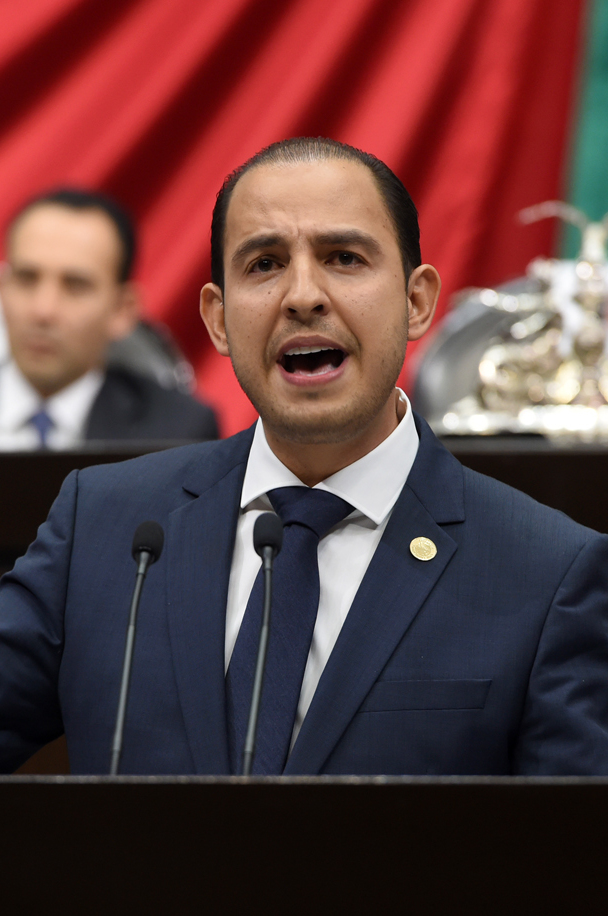

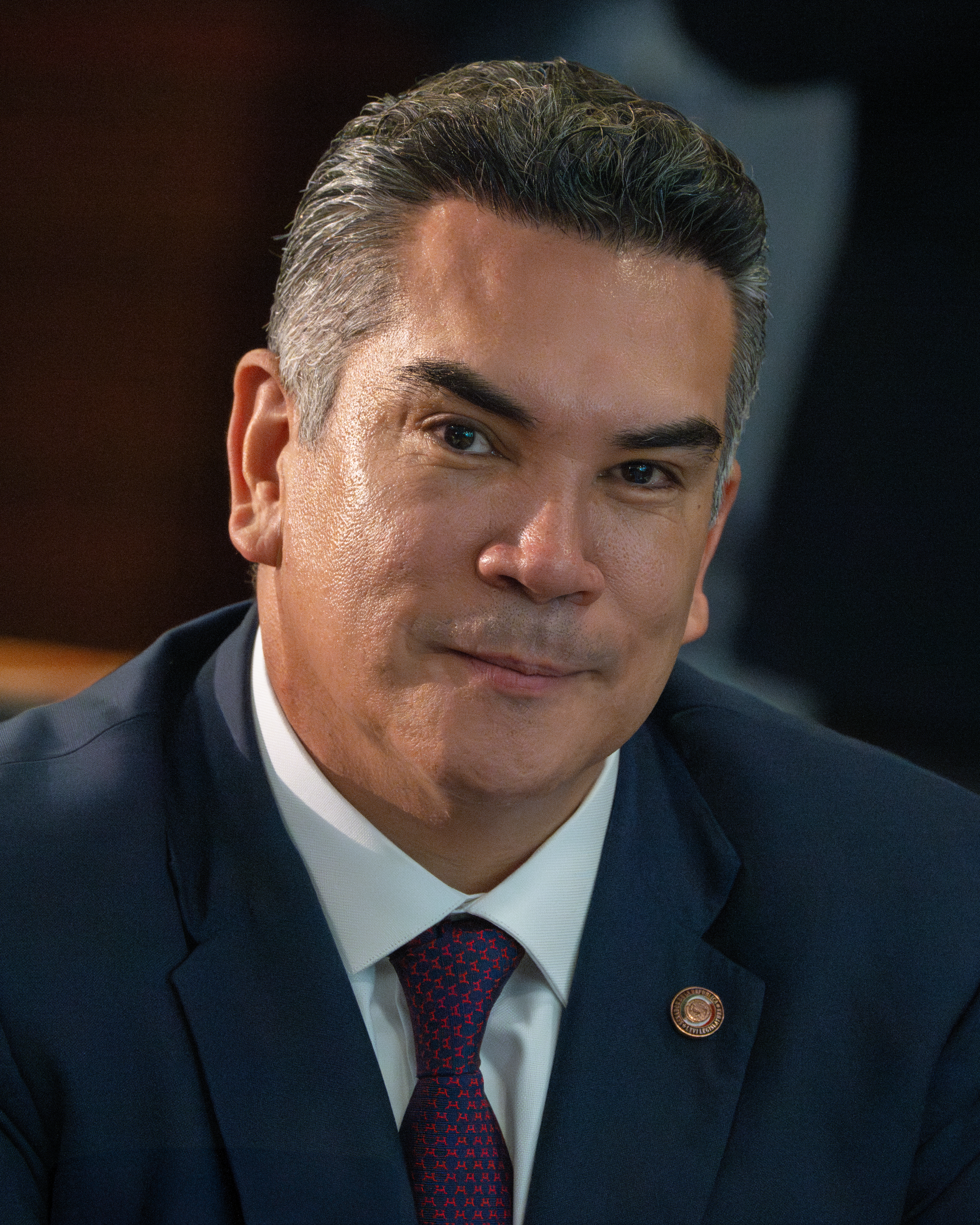

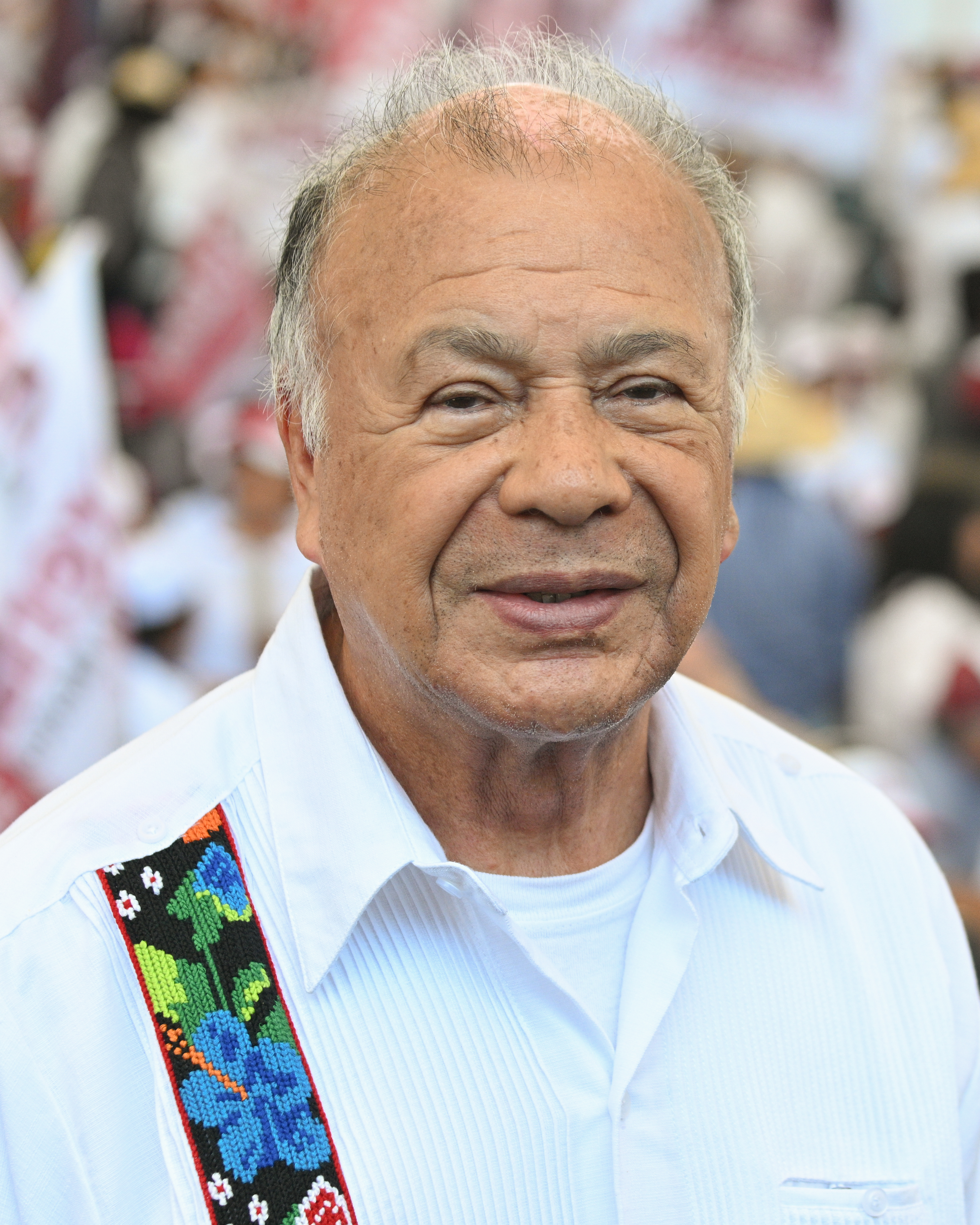

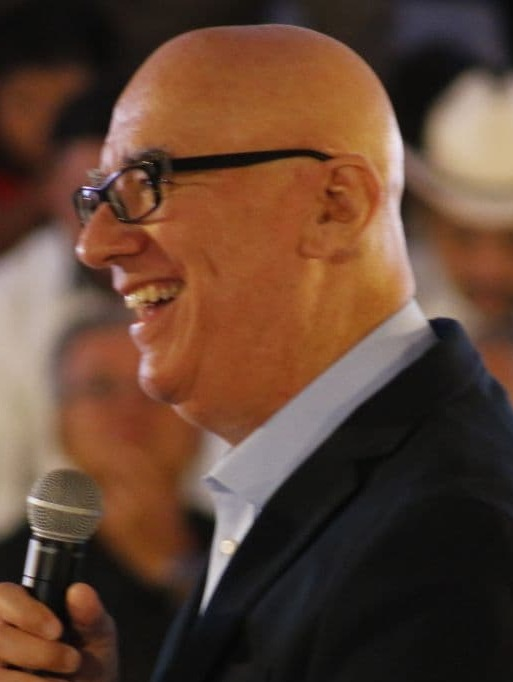

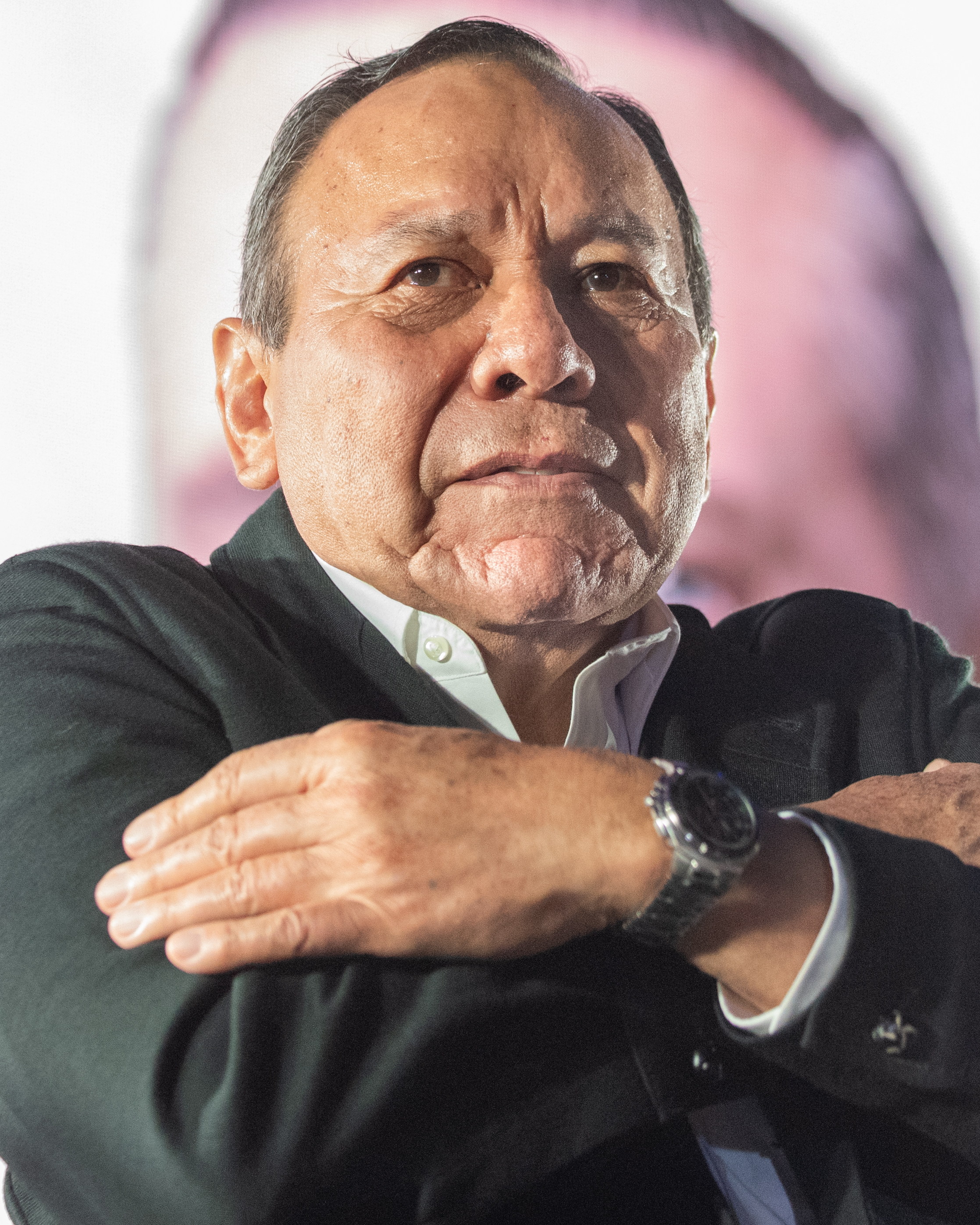
| | First party | Second party | Third party |
|---|---|---|---|
| Leader | Mario Delgado | Marko Cortés | Alejandro Moreno |
| Party | Morena | PAN | PRI |
| Last election | 55 seats | 22 seats | 14 seats |
| Seats after | 60 | 21 | 16 |
| Seat change | ▲5 | ▼1 | ▲2 |
| | Fourth party | Fifth party | Sixth party |
| Leader | Karen Castrejón | Alberto Anaya | Dante Delgado |
| Party | PVEM | PT | MC |
| Last election | 6 seats | 6 seats | 7 seats |
| Seats after | 14 | 9 | 5 |
| Seat change | ▲8 | ▲3 | ▼2 |
| | Seventh party |
| Leader | Jesús Zambrano |
| Party | PRD |
| Last election | 8 seats |
| Seats after | 2 |
| Seat change | ▼6 |

The 2024 Mexican Senate election was held on 2 June 2024 as part of the 2024 general election. All 128 seats in the Senate of Mexico were up for election, with the winners serving six-year terms in the 66th and 67th Congresses. Those elected for the first time will be eligible for re-election in the 2030 election.

Before the election, the Senate was controlled by the ruling coalition—a bloc of senators from the National Regeneration Movement (Morena), the Ecologist Green Party of Mexico (PVEM), the Labor Party (PT), and the defunct Social Encounter Party (PES)—who held the majority. The ruling coalition formed an electoral alliance called Sigamos Haciendo Historia, consisting of Morena, PVEM, and PT, with the goal of securing a supermajority to pass outgoing President Andrés Manuel López Obrador's "Plan C," a package of eighteen constitutional amendments. Opposition parties the Institutional Revolutionary Party (PRI), the National Action Party (PAN), and the Party of the Democratic Revolution (PRD) formed the Fuerza y Corazón por México coalition, while Citizens' Movement (MC) participated in the elections independently.

In what many described as a wave election, Sigamos Haciendo Historia won 30 of 32 races, securing most of the first-past-the-post seats and making gains in states governed by the opposition, such as Chihuahua, Coahuila, Durango, Guanajuato, Jalisco, Nuevo León, and Yucatán. Although it initially fell three seats short of a supermajority, with 83 of the 86 seats required, later defections made up the shortfall.

== Background ==
=== Procedure ===
The 128 members of the Senate are elected by two methods: 96 are elected in 32 three-seat constituencies based on the country's states and the remaining 32 are elected in a single nationwide constituency by proportional representation. In the three-seat constituencies, two seats are allocated to the party receiving the highest number of votes (mayoría relativa) and one seat to the party receiving the second-highest number of votes (primera minoría). Senators are elected for six-year terms and will serve in the 66th and 67th Congresses.

=== Senate majorities ===
The absolute majority, required for the approval of laws, is 65 seats, while the supermajority (two-thirds), required for constitutional amendments, is 86 seats.

== Parties and coalitions ==
=== Sigamos Haciendo Historia ===
Sigamos Haciendo Historia ("Let's Keep Making History") is the left-wing coalition comprising the National Regeneration Movement (MORENA), the Labor Party (PT) and the Ecologist Green Party of Mexico (PVEM).

The coalition will field common candidates for the Senate in all states except Baja California, Chiapas, Guerrero, Hidalgo, Oaxaca, Querétaro, San Luis Potosí, Sinaloa, Sonora, Tabasco, Tamaulipas and Tlaxcala. In some of those states, the decision was not due to a breakdown in negotiations but was based on calculations that the parties could take both the first and second places, thus securing a clean sweep of three seats for the coalition.

=== Fuerza y Corazón por México ===
Fuerza y Corazón por México ("Strength and Heart for Mexico") is the opposition coalition, a big tent composed of the National Action Party (PAN), the Institutional Revolutionary Party (PRI) and the Party of the Democratic Revolution (PRD).

The coalition will field common candidates for the Senate in all states except Guanajuato and Oaxaca.

=== Citizens' Movement ===
In a shift of strategy from the 2012 election (when it allied itself with the PRD and the PT) and the 2018 election (when it joined forces with the PAN and the PRD), the Citizens' Movement party (MC) declined to join either coalition and went into the elections on its own, including the Senate elections in all 32 states.

== Results ==
| Party or alliance | | Constituency | | | Party-list | | | Total seats | +/– |
| Party or alliance | | Votes | % | Seats | Votes | % | Seats | Total seats | +/– |
|---|---|---|---|---|---|---|---|---|---|
| Sigamos Haciendo Historia | National Regeneration Movement | 7,526,453 | 13.19 | 21 | 24,484,943 | 42.48 | 14 | 60 | +5 |
| Sigamos Haciendo Historia | Ecologist Green Party of Mexico | 2,298,726 | 4.03 | 4 | 5,357,959 | 9.30 | 3 | 14 | +8 |
| Sigamos Haciendo Historia | Labor Party | 1,215,172 | 2.13 | 0 | 3,214,708 | 5.58 | 2 | 9 | +3 |
| Sigamos Haciendo Historia | Common candidates (Note: Of the elected candidates, 25 belong to the National Regeneration Movement, 7 to the Ecologist Green Party of Mexico, and 7 to the Labor Party.) | 21,731,737 | 38.08 | 39 | | | | – | – |
| Sigamos Haciendo Historia | Total | 32,772,088 | 57.43 | 64 | 33,057,610 | 57.36 | 19 | 83 | +14 |
| Fuerza y Corazón por México | National Action Party | 1,148,920 | 2.01 | 1 | 10,107,537 | 17.54 | 6 | 22 | –1 |
| Fuerza y Corazón por México | Institutional Revolutionary Party | 316,636 | 0.55 | 0 | 6,530,305 | 11.33 | 4 | 16 | +2 |
| Fuerza y Corazón por México | Party of the Democratic Revolution | 76,082 | 0.13 | 0 | 1,363,012 | 2.36 | 0 | 2 | –6 |
| Fuerza y Corazón por México | Common candidates (Note: Of the elected candidates, 15 belong to the National Action Party, 12 to the Institutional Revolutionary Party, and 2 to the Party of the Democratic Revolution.) | 16,244,373 | 28.47 | 29 | | | | – | – |
| Fuerza y Corazón por México | Total | 17,786,011 | 31.17 | 30 | 18,000,854 | 31.23 | 10 | 40 | +2 |
| Citizens' Movement | | 6,460,220 | 11.32 | 2 | 6,528,238 | 11.33 | 3 | 5 | –2 |
| Non-registered candidates | | 46,230 | 0.08 | 0 | 47,092 | 0.08 | 0 | 0 | 0 |
| Total | | 57,064,549 | 100.00 | 96 | 57,633,794 | 100.00 | 32 | 128 | 0 |
| Valid votes | | 57,064,549 | 96.08 | | 57,633,794 | 96.05 | | | |
| Invalid/blank votes | | 2,326,742 | 3.92 | | 2,369,932 | 3.95 | | | |
| Total votes | | 59,391,291 | 100.00 | | 60,003,726 | 100.00 | | | |
Source: INE (PR)

== Aguascalientes ==
In 2018, Martha Márquez Alvarado and Juan Antonio Martín del Campo, representing the Por México al Frente electoral alliance, were elected with 35.72% of the vote. Daniel Gutiérrez Castorena, from the Juntos Haremos Historia alliance, secured the first minority seat with 28.67% of the vote.

Incumbent Senator Juan Antonio Martín del Campo and local deputy María de Jesús Díaz Marmolejo were nominated by the Fuerza y Corazón por México coalition. Nora Ruvalcaba Gámez was nominated alongside incumbent Senator Daniel Gutiérrez Castorena by the Sigamos Haciendo Historia coalition.

| Party or alliance | Candidates | Votes | % |
|---|---|---|---|
| Fuerza y Corazón por México | ✓ Juan Antonio Martín del Campo; ✓ María de Jesús Díaz Marmolejo | 351,672 | 54.91 |
| Sigamos Haciendo Historia | ✓ Nora Ruvalcaba Gámez; Daniel Gutiérrez Castorena | 244,330 | 38.15 |
| Citizens' Movement | Jorge Armando Narváez Narváez; Sara Imelda Miranda Rodríguez | 44,000 | 6.87 |
| Non-registered candidates | | 497 | 0.08 |
| Total | | 640,499 | 100.00 |
| Valid votes | | 640,499 | 97.49 |
| Invalid/blank votes | | 16,467 | 2.51 |
| Total votes | | 656,966 | 100.00 |
Source: INE

== Baja California ==
| Party or alliance | Candidates | Votes | % |
|---|---|---|---|
| National Regeneration Movement | ✓ Julieta Ramírez Padilla; ✓ Armando Ayala Robles | 771,242 | 53.23 |
| Fuerza y Corazón por México | ✓ Gustavo Sánchez Vásquez; Guadalupe Gutiérrez Fregozo | 312,998 | 21.60 |
| Ecologist Green Party of Mexico | Juan Carlos Hank Krauss; Mónica Juliana Vega Aguirre | 159,338 | 11.00 |
| Citizens' Movement | David Saúl Guakil; Dora Argelia Nuñez Garcia | 127,165 | 8.78 |
| Labor Party | Jaime Bonilla Valdez; Janeth Raquel Tapia Barrera | 76,557 | 5.28 |
| Non-registered candidates | | 1,649 | 0.11 |
| Total | | 1,448,949 | 100.00 |
| Valid votes | | 1,448,949 | 94.64 |
| Invalid/blank votes | | 82,105 | 5.36 |
| Total votes | | 1,531,054 | 100.00 |
Source: INE

== Baja California Sur ==
| Party or alliance | Candidates | Votes | % |
|---|---|---|---|
| Sigamos Haciendo Historia | ✓ Lucía Trasviña Waldenrath; ✓ Homero Davis Castro | 178,921 | 55.82 |
| Fuerza y Corazón por México | ✓ Susana del Carmen Zatarain García; Antonio Manríquez Guluarte | 113,591 | 35.44 |
| Citizens' Movement | Álvaro de la Peña Angulo; Maritza Muñoz Vargas | 27,775 | 8.66 |
| Non-registered candidates | | 257 | 0.08 |
| Total | | 320,544 | 100.00 |
| Valid votes | | 320,544 | 96.82 |
| Invalid/blank votes | | 10,514 | 3.18 |
| Total votes | | 331,058 | 100.00 |
Source: INE

== Campeche ==
| Party or alliance | Candidates | Votes | % |
|---|---|---|---|
| Sigamos Haciendo Historia | ✓ María Martina Kantún Can; ✓ Aníbal Ostoa Ortega | 214,004 | 49.92 |
| Citizens' Movement | ✓ No candidate Dulce María Dorantes Cervera | 150,565 | 35.13 |
| Fuerza y Corazón por México | Karla Guadalupe Toledo Zamora; Lydia Helena Marquart Lliteras | 63,850 | 14.90 |
| Non-registered candidates | | 235 | 0.05 |
| Total | | 428,654 | 100.00 |
| Valid votes | | 428,654 | 97.18 |
| Invalid/blank votes | | 12,448 | 2.82 |
| Total votes | | 441,102 | 100.00 |
Source: INE

== Chiapas ==
| Party or alliance | Candidates | Votes | % |
|---|---|---|---|
| National Regeneration Movement | ✓ Sasil de León Villard; ✓ José Manuel Cruz Castellanos | 937,420 | 41.56 |
| Ecologist Green Party of Mexico | ✓ Luis Armando Melgar Bravo; María Eugenia Culebro Pérez | 523,568 | 23.21 |
| Fuerza y Corazón por México | Williams Ochoa; Micaela Teratol Gómez | 395,855 | 17.55 |
| Labor Party | Leticia Méndez Intzin; Edwin Rolando Herrera Rodriguez | 258,896 | 11.48 |
| Citizens' Movement | Flor de María González Pérez; Sergio Luis Morales Hernández | 138,440 | 6.14 |
| Non-registered candidates | | 1,530 | 0.07 |
| Total | | 2,255,709 | 100.00 |
| Valid votes | | 2,255,709 | 92.12 |
| Invalid/blank votes | | 193,081 | 7.88 |
| Total votes | | 2,448,790 | 100.00 |
Source: INE

== Chihuahua ==
| Party or alliance | Candidates | Votes | % |
|---|---|---|---|
| Sigamos Haciendo Historia | ✓ Andrea Chávez Treviño; ✓ Juan Carlos Loera de la Rosa | 861,068 | 54.30 |
| Fuerza y Corazón por México | ✓ Mario Vázquez Robles; Daniela Álvarez Hernández | 596,041 | 37.59 |
| Citizens' Movement | Zury Fernanda Espino García; César Alberto Peña Valles | 127,643 | 8.05 |
| Non-registered candidates | | 989 | 0.06 |
| Total | | 1,585,741 | 100.00 |
| Valid votes | | 1,585,741 | 97.14 |
| Invalid/blank votes | | 46,618 | 2.86 |
| Total votes | | 1,632,359 | 100.00 |
Source: INE

== Mexico City ==
| Party or alliance | Candidates | Votes | % |
|---|---|---|---|
| Sigamos Haciendo Historia | ✓ Omar García Harfuch; ✓ Ernestina Godoy Ramos | 3,015,630 | 55.51 |
| Fuerza y Corazón por México | ✓ Cynthia López Castro; Verónica Juárez Piña | 2,012,534 | 37.04 |
| Citizens' Movement | Alejandra Barrales; Sandra Cuevas | 399,046 | 7.35 |
| Non-registered candidates | | 5,487 | 0.10 |
| Total | | 5,432,697 | 100.00 |
| Valid votes | | 5,432,697 | 97.82 |
| Invalid/blank votes | | 120,937 | 2.18 |
| Total votes | | 5,553,634 | 100.00 |
Source: INE

== Coahuila ==
| Party or alliance | Candidates | Votes | % |
|---|---|---|---|
| Sigamos Haciendo Historia | ✓ Luis Fernando Salazar Fernández; ✓ Cecilia Guadiana Mandujano | 749,669 | 48.69 |
| Fuerza y Corazón por México | ✓ Miguel Riquelme Solís; María Bárbara Cepeda Boehringer | 726,309 | 47.17 |
| Citizens' Movement | Valeria López Luévanos; Jorge Haro Santa Cruz | 63,219 | 4.11 |
| Non-registered candidates | | 523 | 0.03 |
| Total | | 1,539,720 | 100.00 |
| Valid votes | | 1,539,720 | 97.82 |
| Invalid/blank votes | | 34,247 | 2.18 |
| Total votes | | 1,573,967 | 100.00 |
Source: INE

== Colima ==
| Party or alliance | Candidates | Votes | % |
|---|---|---|---|
| Sigamos Haciendo Historia | ✓ Virgilio Mendoza Amezcua; ✓ Ana Karen Hernández Aceves | 155,146 | 47.20 |
| Fuerza y Corazón por México | ✓ Mely Romero Celis; Germán Sánchez Álvarez | 110,679 | 33.67 |
| Citizens' Movement | Griselda Martinez Martinez; José de Jesús Dueñas García | 62,605 | 19.05 |
| Non-registered candidates | | 240 | 0.07 |
| Total | | 328,670 | 100.00 |
| Valid votes | | 328,670 | 97.15 |
| Invalid/blank votes | | 9,649 | 2.85 |
| Total votes | | 338,319 | 100.00 |
Source: INE

== Durango ==
| Party or alliance | Candidates | Votes | % |
|---|---|---|---|
| Sigamos Haciendo Historia | ✓ Alejandro González Yáñez; ✓ Margarita Valdez Martínez | 391,087 | 52.05 |
| Fuerza y Corazón por México | ✓ Gina Campuzano González; Gabriela Hernández López | 311,041 | 41.40 |
| Citizens' Movement | Jorge Alejandro Salum del Palacio; Karla Beatriz Tello Arellano | 48,895 | 6.51 |
| Non-registered candidates | | 361 | 0.05 |
| Total | | 751,384 | 100.00 |
| Valid votes | | 751,384 | 97.39 |
| Invalid/blank votes | | 20,174 | 2.61 |
| Total votes | | 771,558 | 100.00 |
Source: INE

== Guanajuato ==
| Party or alliance | Candidates | Votes | % |
|---|---|---|---|
| Sigamos Haciendo Historia | ✓ Ricardo Sheffield; ✓ Virginia Marie Magaña Fonseca | 1,180,600 | 44.73 |
| National Action Party | ✓ Miguel Márquez Márquez; Adriana Rodríguez Vizcarra | 1,074,048 | 40.69 |
| Citizens' Movement | Guadalupe Valenzuela Ríos; Jorge Lerma Santillán | 194,161 | 7.36 |
| Institutional Revolutionary Party | Alicia Muñoz Olivares; Fernando Ávila González | 162,205 | 6.15 |
| Party of the Democratic Revolution | Erika del Rocío Ortiz Vela; Geovanni Jesús Palacios Barajas | 26,808 | 1.02 |
| Non-registered candidates | | 1,661 | 0.06 |
| Total | | 2,639,483 | 100.00 |
| Valid votes | | 2,639,483 | 96.81 |
| Invalid/blank votes | | 87,034 | 3.19 |
| Total votes | | 2,726,517 | 100.00 |
Source: INE

== Guerrero ==
| Party or alliance | Candidates | Votes | % |
|---|---|---|---|
| National Regeneration Movement | ✓ Beatriz Mojica Morga; ✓ Félix Salgado Macedonio | 667,277 | 47.11 |
| Fuerza y Corazón por México | ✓ Manuel Añorve Baños; Ivet Diaz Bahena | 314,006 | 22.17 |
| Citizens' Movement | Enei Aranely Bustamante Rodríguez; Coyolxauhqui Soria Morales | 195,426 | 13.80 |
| Ecologist Green Party of Mexico | Maria Luisa Vargas Mejia; Eduardo Ignacio Neil Cueva Ruiz | 140,950 | 9.95 |
| Labor Party | Yuridia Guerrero Martinez; Guillermo Galeana García | 95,389 | 6.73 |
| Non-registered candidates | | 3,492 | 0.25 |
| Total | | 1,416,540 | 100.00 |
| Valid votes | | 1,416,540 | 92.42 |
| Invalid/blank votes | | 116,110 | 7.58 |
| Total votes | | 1,532,650 | 100.00 |
Source: INE

== Hidalgo ==
| Party or alliance | Candidates | Votes | % |
|---|---|---|---|
| National Regeneration Movement | ✓ Simey Olvera Bautista; ✓ Cuauhtémoc Ochoa Fernández | 716,069 | 49.29 |
| Fuerza y Corazón por México | ✓ Carolina Viggiano Austria; Isidro Romero Alcántara | 313,377 | 21.57 |
| Labor Party | Óscar Damián Sosa Castelán; Karen Daniela Chávez Martínez | 162,698 | 11.20 |
| Citizens' Movement | Elizabeth Adriana Flores Torres; Martha Hernández Hernández | 136,557 | 9.40 |
| Ecologist Green Party of Mexico | Yarely Melo Rodríguez; Fátima Michelle Melo Arteaga | 123,156 | 8.48 |
| Non-registered candidates | | 949 | 0.07 |
| Total | | 1,452,806 | 100.00 |
| Valid votes | | 1,452,806 | 94.88 |
| Invalid/blank votes | | 78,433 | 5.12 |
| Total votes | | 1,531,239 | 100.00 |
Source: INE

== Jalisco ==
| Party or alliance | Candidates | Votes | % |
|---|---|---|---|
| Sigamos Haciendo Historia | ✓ Carlos Lomelí Bolaños; ✓ Rocío Corona Nakamura | 1,547,202 | 41.52 |
| Fuerza y Corazón por México | ✓ Francisco Javier Ramírez Acuña; Natalia Juarez Miranda | 1,129,081 | 30.30 |
| Citizens' Movement | Alberto Esquer Gutiérrez; Mirza Flores Gómez | 1,046,522 | 28.09 |
| Non-registered candidates | | 3,374 | 0.09 |
| Total | | 3,726,179 | 100.00 |
| Valid votes | | 3,726,179 | 97.33 |
| Invalid/blank votes | | 102,289 | 2.67 |
| Total votes | | 3,828,468 | 100.00 |
Source: INE

== State of Mexico ==
| Party or alliance | Candidates | Votes | % |
|---|---|---|---|
| Sigamos Haciendo Historia | ✓ Higinio Martínez Miranda; ✓ Mariela Gutiérrez Escalante | 4,728,299 | 57.94 |
| Fuerza y Corazón por México | ✓ Enrique Vargas del Villar; Brenda María Alvarado Sánchez | 2,589,895 | 31.73 |
| Citizens' Movement | Fernando Alberto García Cuevas; Nelly Maldonado Bürguette | 836,500 | 10.25 |
| Non-registered candidates | | 6,651 | 0.08 |
| Total | | 8,161,345 | 100.00 |
| Valid votes | | 8,161,345 | 97.27 |
| Invalid/blank votes | | 229,087 | 2.73 |
| Total votes | | 8,390,432 | 100.00 |
Source: INE

== Michoacán ==
| Party or alliance | Candidates | Votes | % |
|---|---|---|---|
| Sigamos Haciendo Historia | ✓ Celeste Ascencio Ortega; ✓ Raúl Morón Orozco | 1,026,056 | 52.89 |
| Fuerza y Corazón por México | ✓ Araceli Saucedo Reyes; Carlos Humberto Lucatero Blanco | 656,135 | 33.82 |
| Citizens' Movement | Carlos Herrera Tello; Michelle Garibay Cocco | 254,998 | 13.15 |
| Non-registered candidates | | 2,619 | 0.14 |
| Total | | 1,939,808 | 100.00 |
| Valid votes | | 1,939,808 | 95.12 |
| Invalid/blank votes | | 99,418 | 4.88 |
| Total votes | | 2,039,226 | 100.00 |
Source: INE

== Morelos ==
| Party or alliance | Candidates | Votes | % |
|---|---|---|---|
| Sigamos Haciendo Historia | ✓ Víctor Aureliano Mercado Salgado; ✓ Juanita Guerra Mena | 544,524 | 58.88 |
| Fuerza y Corazón por México | ✓ Ángel García Yáñez; María de la Luz Villa Figueroa | 252,780 | 27.33 |
| Citizens' Movement | Diana Aurea Recio Téllez; Jorge Arizmendi García | 126,612 | 13.69 |
| Non-registered candidates | | 842 | 0.09 |
| Total | | 924,758 | 100.00 |
| Valid votes | | 924,758 | 95.62 |
| Invalid/blank votes | | 42,405 | 4.38 |
| Total votes | | 967,163 | 100.00 |
Source: INE

== Nayarit ==
| Party or alliance | Candidates | Votes | % |
|---|---|---|---|
| Sigamos Haciendo Historia | ✓ Jasmine Bugarín Rodríguez; ✓ Pavel Jarero Velázquez | 297,949 | 57.79 |
| Fuerza y Corazón por México | ✓ Ivideliza Reyes; Yolanda Anahí Gutiérrez Guzmán | 120,636 | 23.40 |
| Citizens' Movement | Ignacio Flores Medina; Julieta Mejía Ibáñez | 96,504 | 18.72 |
| Non-registered candidates | | 487 | 0.09 |
| Total | | 515,576 | 100.00 |
| Valid votes | | 515,576 | 96.09 |
| Invalid/blank votes | | 20,996 | 3.91 |
| Total votes | | 536,572 | 100.00 |
Source: INE

== Nuevo León ==
| Party or alliance | Candidates | Votes | % |
|---|---|---|---|
| Sigamos Haciendo Historia | ✓ Waldo Fernández González; ✓ Blanca Judith Díaz Delgado | 856,233 | 34.77 |
| Citizens' Movement | ✓ Luis Donaldo Colosio Riojas; Martha Patricia Herrera González | 810,431 | 32.91 |
| Fuerza y Corazón por México | Karina Barrón Perales; Fernando Margáin Sada | 794,796 | 32.27 |
| Non-registered candidates | | 1,353 | 0.05 |
| Total | | 2,462,813 | 100.00 |
| Valid votes | | 2,462,813 | 97.65 |
| Invalid/blank votes | | 59,340 | 2.35 |
| Total votes | | 2,522,153 | 100.00 |
Source: INE

== Oaxaca ==
| Party or alliance | Candidates | Votes | % |
|---|---|---|---|
| National Regeneration Movement | ✓ Antonino Morales Toledo; ✓ Luisa Cortés García | 891,887 | 51.30 |
| Ecologist Green Party of Mexico | ✓ Laura Estrada Mauro; Roberto Camerino Pérez Delgado | 239,960 | 13.80 |
| Labor Party | Benjamín Robles Montoya; Karla Jiménez Carrasco | 216,794 | 12.47 |
| Institutional Revolutionary Party | María del Carmén Ricardez Vela; Adolfo Romero Lainas | 154,431 | 8.88 |
| Citizens' Movement | Florencia Carolina Aparicio Sánchez; Alberto Sosa Hernández | 109,983 | 6.33 |
| National Action Party | Griselda Galicia García; Abigail Vasconcelos Castellanos | 74,872 | 4.31 |
| Party of the Democratic Revolution | Daisy Araceli Ortiz Jiménez; Tomás Basaldu Gutiérrez | 49,274 | 2.83 |
| Non-registered candidates | | 1,399 | 0.08 |
| Total | | 1,738,600 | 100.00 |
| Valid votes | | 1,738,600 | 93.28 |
| Invalid/blank votes | | 125,246 | 6.72 |
| Total votes | | 1,863,846 | 100.00 |
Source: INE

== Puebla ==
| Party or alliance | Candidates | Votes | % |
|---|---|---|---|
| Sigamos Haciendo Historia | ✓ Ignacio Mier Velazco; ✓ Lizeth Sánchez García | 1,968,426 | 63.50 |
| Fuerza y Corazón por México | ✓ Néstor Camarillo Medina; Ana Teresa Aranda | 858,730 | 27.70 |
| Citizens' Movement | Sofia Pezzat Said; Alida Díaz Balcazar | 270,298 | 8.72 |
| Non-registered candidates | | 2,199 | 0.07 |
| Total | | 3,099,653 | 100.00 |
| Valid votes | | 3,099,653 | 95.52 |
| Invalid/blank votes | | 145,294 | 4.48 |
| Total votes | | 3,244,947 | 100.00 |
Source: INE

== Querétaro ==
| Party or alliance | Candidates | Votes | % |
|---|---|---|---|
| Fuerza y Corazón por México | ✓ Guadalupe Murguía Gutiérrez; ✓ Agustín Dorantes Lámbarri | 525,775 | 46.97 |
| National Regeneration Movement | ✓ Beatriz Robles Gutiérrez; Santiago Nieto Castillo | 425,257 | 37.99 |
| Citizens' Movement | José Antonio Ortega Cerbón; Iliana del Carmen Luna Gómez | 74,270 | 6.64 |
| Ecologist Green Party of Mexico | Gaby Argüelles Solis; Alejandro Evencio Hernández Olvera | 66,766 | 5.96 |
| Labor Party | Alma Ingrid Rodriguez Morales; Carlos Alberto Rentería Rivera | 26,245 | 2.34 |
| Non-registered candidates | | 1,032 | 0.09 |
| Total | | 1,119,345 | 100.00 |
| Valid votes | | 1,119,345 | 94.98 |
| Invalid/blank votes | | 59,129 | 5.02 |
| Total votes | | 1,178,474 | 100.00 |
Source: INE

== Quintana Roo ==
| Party or alliance | Candidates | Votes | % |
|---|---|---|---|
| Sigamos Haciendo Historia | ✓ Anahí González Hernández; ✓ Eugenio Segura Vázquez | 555,829 | 70.60 |
| Fuerza y Corazón por México | ✓ Mayuli Martínez Simón; Cindy Yareli Cocom Dzidz | 148,348 | 18.84 |
| Citizens' Movement | Roberto Palazuelos; Mayusa Isolina González Cauich | 82,294 | 10.45 |
| Non-registered candidates | | 833 | 0.11 |
| Total | | 787,304 | 100.00 |
| Valid votes | | 787,304 | 96.71 |
| Invalid/blank votes | | 26,781 | 3.29 |
| Total votes | | 814,085 | 100.00 |
Source: INE

== San Luis Potosí ==
| Party or alliance | Candidates | Votes | % |
|---|---|---|---|
| Ecologist Green Party of Mexico | ✓ Ruth González Silva; ✓ Gilberto Hernández Villafuerte | 524,950 | 41.55 |
| Fuerza y Corazón por México | ✓ Verónica Rodríguez Hernández; Jaime Chalita Zarur | 336,027 | 26.59 |
| National Regeneration Movement | Rita Ozalia Rodríguez Velázquez; Juan Ignacio Segura Morquecho | 272,417 | 21.56 |
| Citizens' Movement | Josefina Salazar Báez; Arturo Carral Adán | 99,990 | 7.91 |
| Labor Party | Teresa de Jesús Mendoza Rivera; René Oyarvide Ibarra | 29,065 | 2.30 |
| Non-registered candidates | | 1,080 | 0.09 |
| Total | | 1,263,529 | 100.00 |
| Valid votes | | 1,263,529 | 93.46 |
| Invalid/blank votes | | 88,389 | 6.54 |
| Total votes | | 1,351,918 | 100.00 |
Source: INE

== Sinaloa ==
| Party or alliance | Candidates | Votes | % |
|---|---|---|---|
| National Regeneration Movement | ✓ Imelda Castro Castro; ✓ Enrique Inzunza | 645,428 | 51.93 |
| Fuerza y Corazón por México | ✓ Paloma Sánchez Ramos; Eduardo Ortiz Hernández | 330,152 | 26.56 |
| Ecologist Green Party of Mexico | Jesús Antonio Valdés Palazuelos; Nubia Xiclali Ramos Carbajal | 118,575 | 9.54 |
| Citizens' Movement | María Fernanda Rivera Romo; Miguel Ángel Vicente Rentería | 84,378 | 6.79 |
| Labor Party | Jesús Estrada Ferreiro; Yolanda de la Cruz Cárdenas Avilés | 63,678 | 5.12 |
| Non-registered candidates | | 642 | 0.05 |
| Total | | 1,242,853 | 100.00 |
| Valid votes | | 1,242,853 | 94.67 |
| Invalid/blank votes | | 70,010 | 5.33 |
| Total votes | | 1,312,863 | 100.00 |
Source: INE

== Sonora ==
| Party or alliance | Candidates | Votes | % |
|---|---|---|---|
| National Regeneration Movement | ✓ Lorenia Valles Sampedro; ✓ Heriberto Aguilar Castillo | 508,797 | 46.41 |
| Fuerza y Corazón por México | ✓ Manlio Fabio Beltrones; Lilly Téllez | 302,755 | 27.62 |
| Citizens' Movement | Ernesto de Lucas Hopkins; Maria Dolores Rosas Almada | 126,011 | 11.49 |
| Labor Party | Célida López Cárdenas; Froylán Gámez Gamboa | 106,625 | 9.73 |
| Ecologist Green Party of Mexico | Paola Guadalupe Dixon Chaira; Brenda Lizeth Quijada Romo | 51,419 | 4.69 |
| Non-registered candidates | | 666 | 0.06 |
| Total | | 1,096,273 | 100.00 |
| Valid votes | | 1,096,273 | 94.54 |
| Invalid/blank votes | | 63,294 | 5.46 |
| Total votes | | 1,159,567 | 100.00 |
Source: INE

== Tabasco ==
| Party or alliance | Candidates | Votes | % |
|---|---|---|---|
| National Regeneration Movement | ✓ Rosalinda López Hernández; ✓ Óscar Cantón Zetina | 656,422 | 63.72 |
| Fuerza y Corazón por México | ✓ José Sabino Herrera Dagdug; Leda Ferrer Ruiz | 149,321 | 14.50 |
| Citizens' Movement | Gerardo Gaudiano Rovirosa; Maria Leticia González Calcáneo | 83,191 | 8.08 |
| Ecologist Green Party of Mexico | Miguel Armando Vélez Mier y Concha; Barbara Paola Aranguren Rosique | 77,784 | 7.55 |
| Labor Party | Juan Carlos Ortiz Celaya; Gladys del Carmen López Gómez | 62,793 | 6.10 |
| Non-registered candidates | | 639 | 0.06 |
| Total | | 1,030,150 | 100.00 |
| Valid votes | | 1,030,150 | 93.78 |
| Invalid/blank votes | | 68,334 | 6.22 |
| Total votes | | 1,098,484 | 100.00 |
Source: INE

== Tamaulipas ==
| Party or alliance | Candidates | Votes | % |
|---|---|---|---|
| National Regeneration Movement | ✓ Olga Patricia Sosa Ruiz; ✓ José Ramón Gómez Leal | 737,494 | 47.99 |
| Fuerza y Corazón por México | ✓ Imelda Sanmiguel Sánchez; Arturo Fidel Núñez Ruíz | 452,853 | 29.47 |
| Ecologist Green Party of Mexico | Eugenio Hernández Flores; Maki Esther Ortiz Domínguez | 184,479 | 12.00 |
| Citizens' Movement | Andrea García García; David Carlos Feliciano Cordero Herrera | 112,018 | 7.29 |
| Labor Party | Cendy Robles Méndez; José Francisco Chavira Martinez | 49,095 | 3.19 |
| Non-registered candidates | | 865 | 0.06 |
| Total | | 1,536,804 | 100.00 |
| Valid votes | | 1,536,804 | 95.23 |
| Invalid/blank votes | | 76,974 | 4.77 |
| Total votes | | 1,613,778 | 100.00 |
Source: INE

== Tlaxcala ==
| Party or alliance | Candidates | Votes | % |
|---|---|---|---|
| National Regeneration Movement | ✓ José Antonio Álvarez Lima; ✓ Ana Lilia Rivera | 296,743 | 43.24 |
| Fuerza y Corazón por México | ✓ Anabell Ávalos Zempoalteca; José Domingo Meneses Rodríguez | 156,674 | 22.83 |
| Ecologist Green Party of Mexico | Sergio González Hernández; Isela Rojas Amador | 87,781 | 12.79 |
| Citizens' Movement | Elsa Cordero Martínez; Alfonso González Corona | 77,271 | 11.26 |
| Labor Party | Rodrigo Cuahutle Salazar; Oralia López Hernández | 67,337 | 9.81 |
| Non-registered candidates | | 429 | 0.06 |
| Total | | 686,235 | 100.00 |
| Valid votes | | 686,235 | 93.50 |
| Invalid/blank votes | | 47,679 | 6.50 |
| Total votes | | 733,914 | 100.00 |
Source: INE

== Veracruz ==
| Party or alliance | Candidates | Votes | % |
|---|---|---|---|
| Sigamos Haciendo Historia | ✓ Claudia Tello Espinosa; ✓ Manuel Huerta Ladrón de Guevara | 2,205,886 | 62.53 |
| Fuerza y Corazón por México | ✓ Miguel Ángel Yunes Márquez; Sara Ladrón de Guevara | 1,041,080 | 29.51 |
| Citizens' Movement | Dante Delgado Morales; Angélica Sánchez Hernández | 278,872 | 7.91 |
| Non-registered candidates | | 1,894 | 0.05 |
| Total | | 3,527,732 | 100.00 |
| Valid votes | | 3,527,732 | 97.07 |
| Invalid/blank votes | | 106,549 | 2.93 |
| Total votes | | 3,634,281 | 100.00 |
Source: INE

== Yucatán ==
| Party or alliance | Candidates | Votes | % |
|---|---|---|---|
| Sigamos Haciendo Historia | ✓ Verónica Camino Farjat; ✓ Jorge Carlos Ramírez Marín | 656,544 | 53.25 |
| Fuerza y Corazón por México | ✓ Rolando Zapata Bello; Kathia Bolio Pinelo | 505,028 | 40.96 |
| Citizens' Movement | Nayelli Concepción Hernández Crespo; Mariana Zepeda Lahud | 70,842 | 5.75 |
| Non-registered candidates | | 594 | 0.05 |
| Total | | 1,233,008 | 100.00 |
| Valid votes | | 1,233,008 | 97.11 |
| Invalid/blank votes | | 36,719 | 2.89 |
| Total votes | | 1,269,727 | 100.00 |
Source: INE

== Zacatecas ==
| Party or alliance | Candidates | Votes | % |
|---|---|---|---|
| Sigamos Haciendo Historia | ✓ Verónica Díaz Robles; ✓ Saúl Monreal Ávila | 354,334 | 48.46 |
| Fuerza y Corazón por México | ✓ Claudia Anaya Mota; Miguel Ángel Torres Rosales | 272,354 | 37.25 |
| Citizens' Movement | María Teresa Villegas Santillán; Tomás Torres Torres | 103,738 | 14.19 |
| Non-registered candidates | | 762 | 0.10 |
| Total | | 731,188 | 100.00 |
| Valid votes | | 731,188 | 95.93 |
| Invalid/blank votes | | 30,992 | 4.07 |
| Total votes | | 762,180 | 100.00 |
Source: INE

== Senators-at-large ==
An additional 32 senators-at-large were elected from nationwide lists drawn up by the parties, with the winners allocated among them in proportion to their share of the national vote in the Senate election. The party lists can be found on the website of the National Electoral Institute.

The at-large ("plurinominal") Senate seats were distributed as follows:

PAN: 6 seats

▌ Marko Cortés (PAN)
▌ Karen Michel González Márquez (PAN)
▌ Ricardo Anaya Cortés (PAN)
▌ Lilly Téllez (PAN)
▌ Mauricio Vila Dosal (PAN)
▌ Laura Esquivel Torres (PAN)

PRI: 4 seats

▌ Alejandro Moreno (PRI)
▌ Karla Guadalupe Toledo Zamora (PRI)
▌ Pablo Angulo Briceño (PRI)
▌ Cristina Ruiz (PRI)

PT: 2 seats

▌ Alberto Anaya (PT)
▌ Yeidckol Polevnsky (PT)

PVEM: 3 seats

▌ Manuel Velasco (PVEM)
▌ Maki Esther Ortiz (PVEM)
▌ Luis Alfonso Silva Romo (PVEM)

MC: 3 seats

▌ Clemente Castañeda (MC)
▌ Alejandra Barrales (MC)
▌ Amalia García (MC)

MORENA: 14 seats

▌ Adán Augusto López (MORENA)
▌ Citlalli Hernández (MORENA)
▌ Alejandro Esquer Verdugo (MORENA)
▌ Susana Harp (MORENA)
▌ Gerardo Fernández Noroña (MORENA)
▌ Laura Itzel Castillo (MORENA)
▌ Marcelo Ebrard (MORENA)
▌ Martha Lucía Mícher (MORENA)
▌ Javier Corral Jurado (MORENA)
▌ Geovanna Bañuelos de la Torre (PT)
▌ Alfonso Cepeda Salas (MORENA)
▌ Karina Isabel Ruiz Ruiz (MORENA)
▌ Alejandro Murat (MORENA)
▌ Edith López Hernández (MORENA)
