= Blackledge =

Blackledge may refer to:

== People with the surname ==
- Benjamin Blackledge (c. 1760) U.S. educator
- Brett Blackledge, reporter
- Gary Blackledge, Northern Irish football player
- Gina Cruz Blackledge (born 1969), Mexican politician, Senator from Baja California in 2018–2024
- John Blackledge, English kickboxer
- Luke Blackledge (born 1990), English boxer
- Ron Blackledge (born 1938), American football coach
- Todd Blackledge (born 1961), American football quarterback
- William Blackledge (died 1828), U.S. Congressman
- William Salter Blackledge (1793–1857), U.S. Congressman

== Other uses ==
- Blackledge River, Connecticut
- Blackledge-Gair House, Historic Place, New Jersey
- Blackledge–Kearney House, Historic Place, New Jersey
