= Gina Cruz Blackledge =

Mexican politician

Senator of the Congress of the Union for Baja California
- In office 1 September 2018 – 31 August 2024 Serving with Gerardo Novelo Osuna and Alejandra León Gastélum
- Preceded by: Marco Antonio Blásquez Salinas

Personal details
- Born: Gina Andrea Cruz Blackledge; 8 July 1969 (age 57) Mexicali, Baja California, Mexico
- Party: PAN
- Education: Autonomous University of Baja California
- Occupation: Politician

Gina Andrea Cruz Blackledge (Note: In this name that follows Hispanic American naming customs, the first or paternal surname is Cruz and the second or maternal family name is Blackledge.) (born 8 July 1969) is a Mexican lawyer and politician from the National Action Party (PAN). She served as a senator for Baja California from 2018 to 2024.

== Early life ==
Cruz Blackledge was born on 8 July 1969 in Mexicali, Baja California. She graduated from the Autonomous University of Baja California in 1992.

== Career ==
Cruz joined the National Action Party in 1990.

She sat in the Chamber of Deputies in 2002 (as the alternate of Bernardo Borbón Vilches, a plurinominal deputy for the first region), and from 2015 to 2018 as a first-region plurinominal deputy.

She was elected to the Senate for the state of Baja California's third seat in the 2018 general election.
