= Alejandra León Gastélum =

Mexican politician (born 1976)

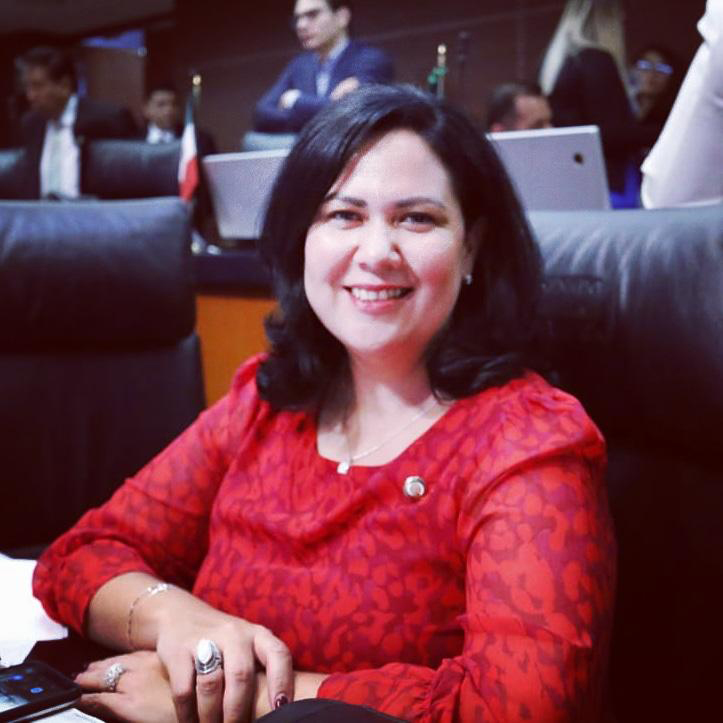

Senator of the Congress of the Union for Baja California
- Incumbent
- Assumed office 1 September 2018 Serving with Gerardo Novelo Osuna and Gina Cruz Blackledge
- Preceded by: Víctor Hermosillo y Celada

Personal details
- Born: Alejandra del Carmen León Gastélum; 9 June 1976 (age 50)
- Party: Morena
- Other political affiliations: PT; Citizens' Movement
- Education: Mexicali Institute of Technology
- Occupation: Politician

Alejandra del Carmen León Gastélum (born 9 June 1976) is a Mexican politician who is currently Senator from the State of Baja California. She is a member of Morena, having previously served in the Senate as a member of the Labor Party and the Citizens' Movement.

== Education ==
She graduated from Mexicali Institute of Technology.

== Career ==
She has served as Senator from Baja California since 2018. In April 2021, she resigned from MORENA and joined the Labor Party. She later joined the Citizens' Movement and was a regional coordinator for the party in 2024. In April 2024, she rejoined MORENA.

As a member of the Senate, she has been a leading advocate for Armenian genocide recognition. In 2022, she introduced a Point of Agreement in the Senate to recognize the genocide, which was approved by the body in a unanimous Senate vote in 2023. In April 2023, she and fellow Senator Indira Kempis Martínez met with Armenian president Vahagn Khachaturyan regarding the blockade of the Lachin corridor.
