= Laura Esquivel (disambiguation) =

Laura Esquivel (Laura Beatriz Esquivel Valdés, born 1950) is a Mexican novelist, screenwriter and politician.

Laura Esquivel may also refer to:

- Laura Esquivel Torres (born 1988), Mexican politician
- Laura Natalia Esquivel (born 1994), Argentine actress and singer
