= Alejandro González Yáñez =

Mexican politician

Senator of the Congress of the Union for Durango
- Incumbent
- Assumed office 1 September 2021 Serving with Margarita Valdez Martínez and José Ramón Enríquez Herrera
- Preceded by: Miguel Ángel Lucero Olivas
- In office 1 September 2018 – 5 March 2019
- Preceded by: Ismael Hernández
- Succeeded by: Miguel Ángel Lucero Olivas
- In office 1 September 2006 – 31 August 2012

Federal Deputy of the Congress of the Union
- In office 1 September 2003 – 31 August 2006

Personal details
- Born: 9 September 1956 (age 69) Mexico City, Mexico
- Party: PT
- Occupation: Politician

Alejandro González Yáñez (born 9 September 1956) is a Mexican politician affiliated with the Labor Party (PT), of which he was a founding member in 1990.

He served as a senator for the state of Durango in the 64th and 65th Congresses (2018–2024).

He also was a senator in the 60th and 61st Congresses and a federal deputy during the 59th Congress. From 1992 to 1995 he was the mayor of Victoria de Durango.

González Yáñez won election as one of Durango's senators in the 2024 Senate election, occupying the first place on the Sigamos Haciendo Historia coalition's two-name formula.
