= Javier Villacaña Jiménez =

Mexican politician

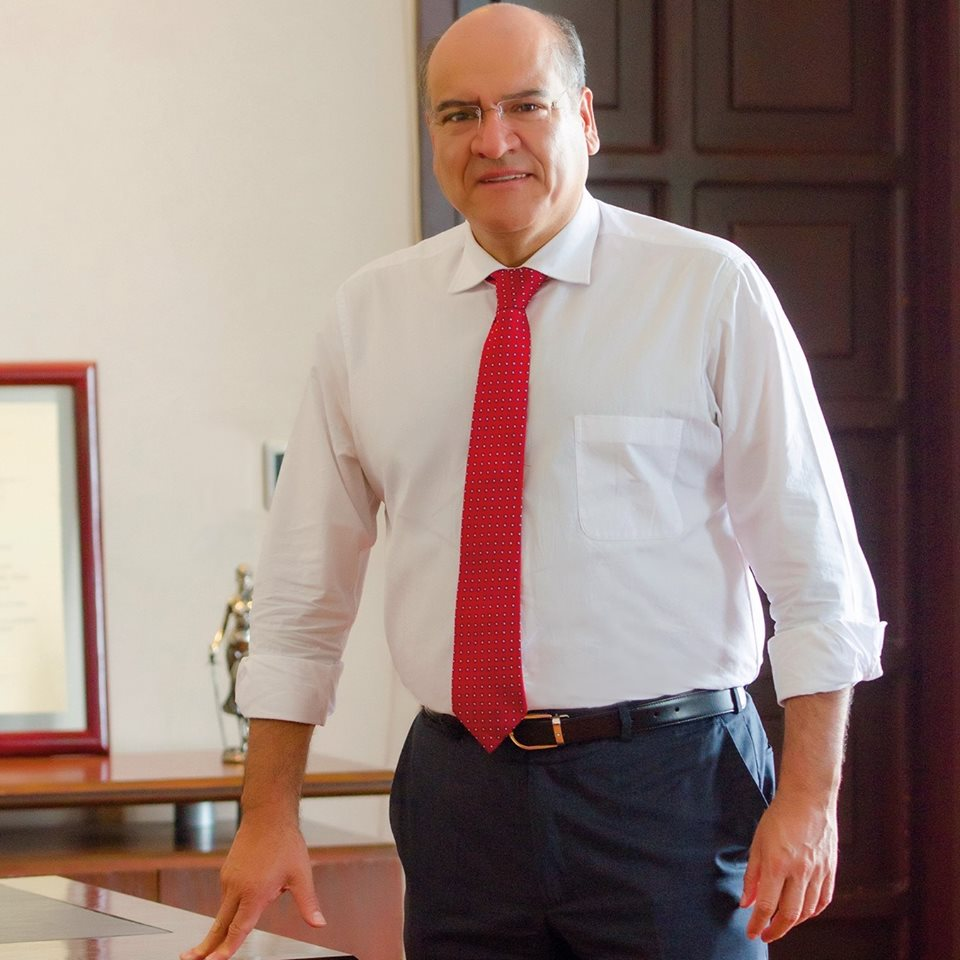
- Born: Oaxaca, Mexico
- Occupation: Politician
- Political party: PRI

José Javier Villacaña Jiménez is a Mexican politician affiliated with the Institutional Revolutionary Party (PRI). In 2013 he was elected mayor of Oaxaca de Juárez. In 2003–2006 he served in the Chamber of Deputies representing the eighth district of Oaxaca as the substitute for Jesús Ángel Díaz Ortega.

During his 2013 mayoral campaign, he was involved in a nationwide controversy by producing a fake professional certificate at the main candidate debate. He publicly claimed to be a lawyer, however no evidence was found of his academic records at any university. In 2015, almost two years after he assumed office as mayor of Oaxaca de Juárez, the Secretary of Education released on its website that Villacaña had earned a law degree that very same year at a local college named Centro Educativo de Puebla, him being at least 50 years old by that time.
