= Jaime Bonilla Valdez =

Former Governor of Baja California, Mexico

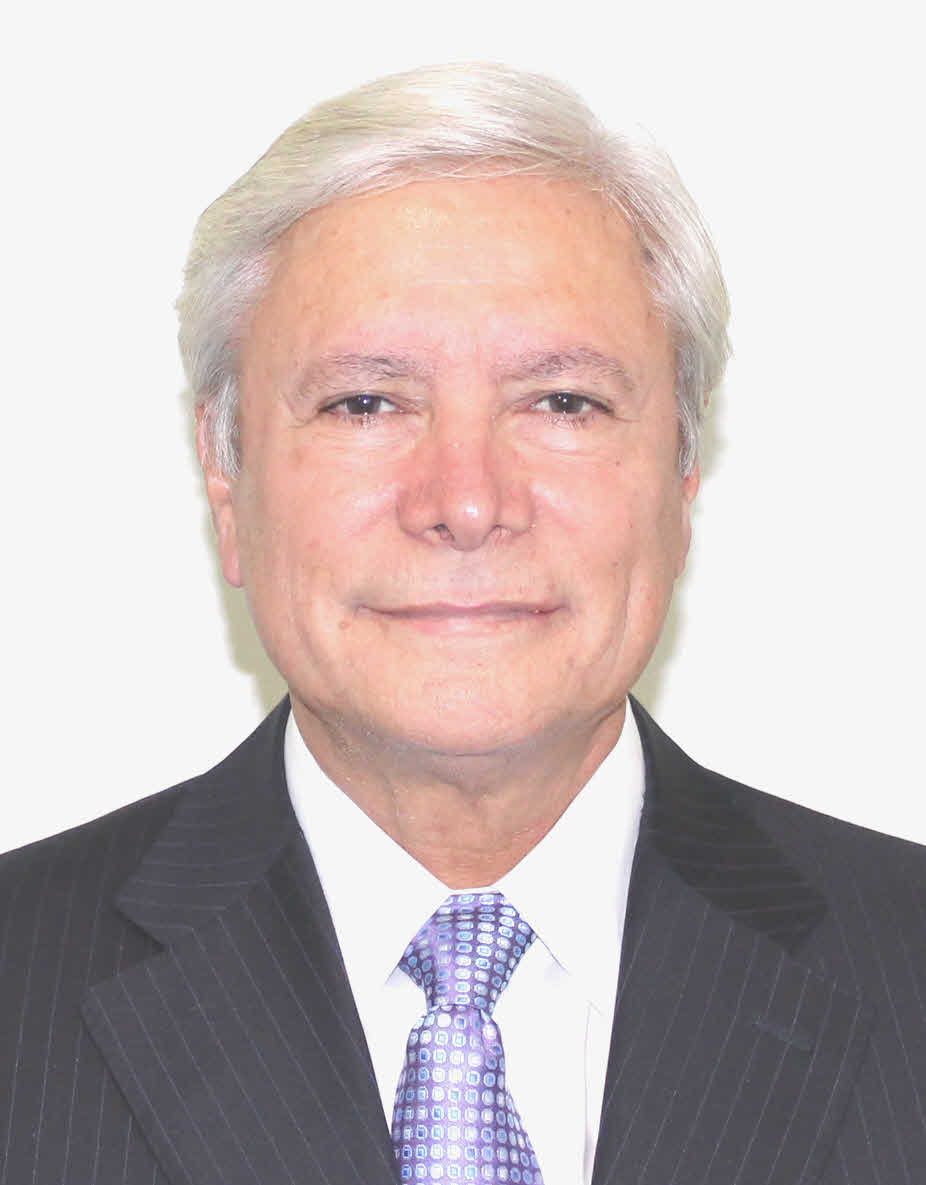

Senator of the Congress of the Union for Baja California
- Incumbent
- Assumed office 10 August 2022
- Preceded by: Vacant
- In office 28 March 2022 – 5 May 2022
- Preceded by: Gerardo Novelo Osuna
- Succeeded by: Vacant
- In office 1 September 2018 – 6 December 2018
- Preceded by: Ernesto Ruffo Appel
- Succeeded by: Gerardo Novelo Osuna

16th Governor of Baja California
- In office 1 November 2019 – 1 November 2021
- Preceded by: Francisco Vega de Lamadrid
- Succeeded by: Marina del Pilar Ávila Olmeda

Personal details
- Born: 9 June 1950 (age 76) Tijuana, Baja California, Mexico
- Citizenship: Mexico; United States (until 2012)
- Party: Labor Party (2012–2015, 2023–present)
- Other political affiliations: MORENA (2015–2023); Republican (2000–2012)
- Education: National Autonomous University of Mexico (BBA)
- Occupation: Politician, Entrepreneur
- Website: https://jaimebonilla.com/

Jaime Bonilla Valdez (born 9 June 1950) is a Mexican politician and entrepreneur who served as the Governor of Baja California from 2019 to 2021 as a member of the National Regeneration Movement party. He has also been a Federal Congressman and a Senator of the Republic.

== Life ==
Bonilla was born in Tijuana, Baja California, and obtained his degree in business administration from the UNAM in 1983. He worked in a variety of companies, including Electrol de México, CONESA, and COVIMEX de México. Between 1982 and 1985, he directed the Potros de Tijuana baseball club, which played in the Liga Mexicana del Pacífico. In 1984, he became the director general and a columnist of the Diario de Baja California newspaper, which began a career in media ownership for Bonilla. Through his company PSN (originally an acronym for Pacific Spanish Network, now Primer Sistema de Noticias), he directly operates XESS-AM 620 and XESDD-AM 1030 in Tijuana. He also owned XHENB-TV channel 29 in Ensenada, now a cable-only outlet, and his company Media Sports de México holds the concessions for two radio stations operated under brokerage agreements by American programmers, XEPE-AM 1700 and XHPRS-FM 105.7. Bonilla also acquired cable systems in Ensenada and Tecate. Bonilla also owned radio station KURS 1040 in San Diego through his company Quetzal Bilingual Communications; the station was sold in 2016 for $900,000.

In 2000, Bonilla, then a dual citizen of Mexico and the United States, joined the board of the Otay Water District in Otay Mesa, California. While in the US, he lived in Chula Vista, California, and was a donor to Republican causes and even was on the California finance committee for John McCain's 2008 presidential campaign. In March 2012, he announced his resignation from the water board in order to run for federal deputy and simultaneously join the 2012 presidential campaign of Andrés Manuel López Obrador. At the same time, he renounced his dual citizenship, a move necessary to meet the constitutional requirements to run for office. He became a proportional representation deputy on the PT list, during which time he served as the president of the Northern Border Matters Commission and was the state campaign coordinator for the PT in the 2013 Baja California state elections. Bonilla left the post in 2014 in order to become the state party director for the then-new Morena party. His relationship with López Obrador remained close; in 2016, Bonilla invited him to his Petco Park suite for the 2016 Major League Baseball All-Star Game. Party members and leaders say that in Bonilla's media holdings, López Obrador saw a "gold mine" to gain media exposure in Baja California.

On 31 January 2018, López Obrador announced that Bonilla would be the primary Senate candidate in Baja California for the Juntos Haremos Historia coalition, forming a ticket with Alejandra León Gastélum. The Juntos Haremos Historia ticket took first place in the election, securing both candidates seats in the Senate. However, Bonilla has stated that he will only remain in office three months and will then become the state development coordinator in Baja California.

== Governor of Baja California (2019–2021) ==
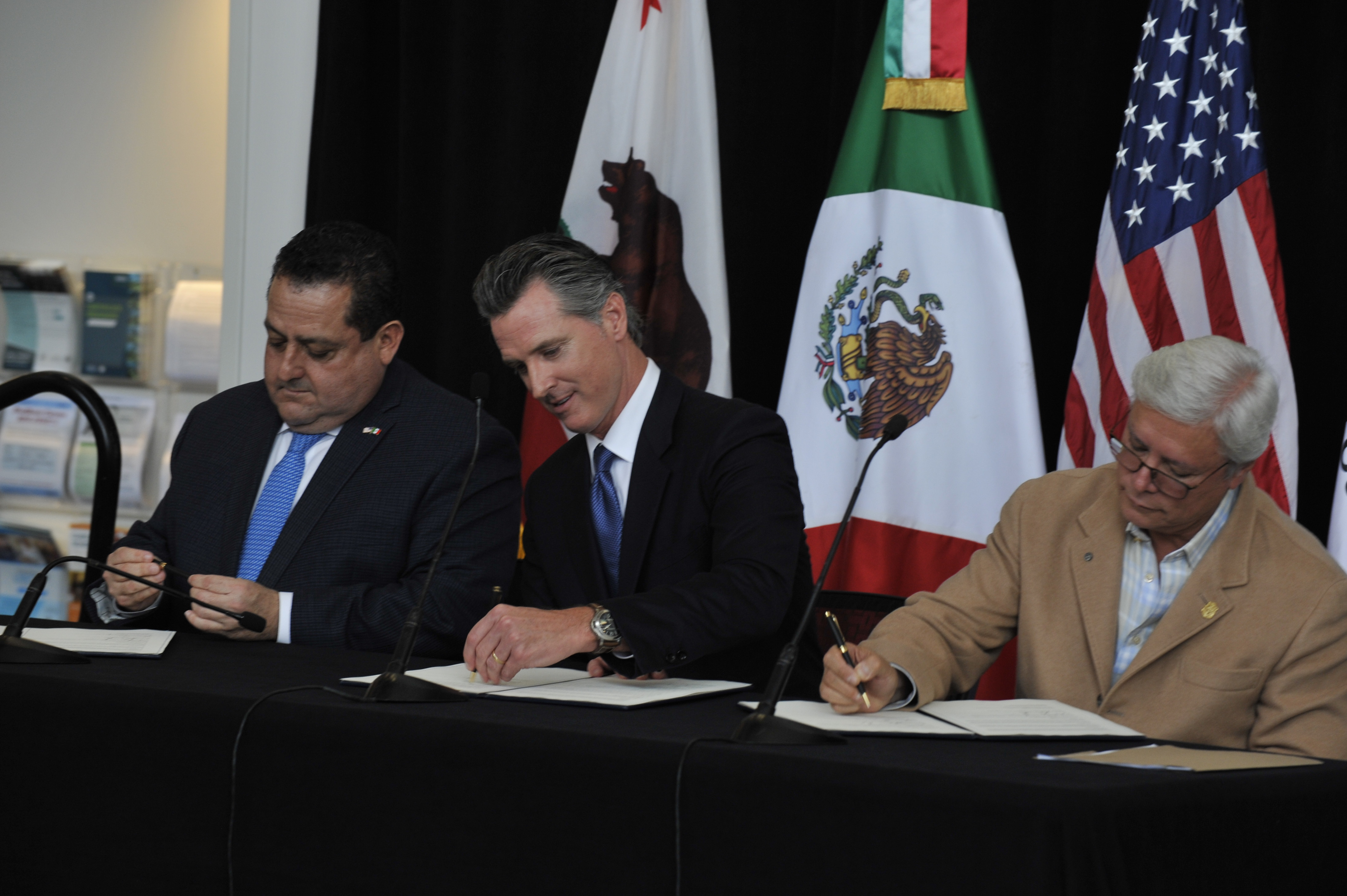
Ceremony for the reestablishment of the Commission of the Californias in 2019, San Diego. Pictured are Governor Jaime Bonilla Valdez of Baja California (left), Governor Gavin Newsom of California (center), and Governor Carlos Mendoza Davis of Baja California Sur (right).

Bonilla won the 2019 gubernatorial election and assumed office on 15 November 2019. The election law had been changed in 2014, mandating another election in 2021 in order to coincide with a Constitutional mandate that gubernatorial elections must coincide with federal elections. Insisting that this meant his term would end in 2024, Morena pushed for a referendum and a legal change. The referendum passed with 82% of the vote but only 1.9% citizen turnout; the so-called Ley Bonilla (Bonilla Law) was passed by the legislature after a thirty-minute debate. On 11 May 2020, the Supreme Court of Justice of the Nation (SCJN) ruled unanimously against the law, meaning Bonilla's term would run from 1 November 2019, to 31 October 2021.

Bonilla was governor during the COVID-19 pandemic in Mexico. As of 13 May 2020, there were 2,524 confirmed cases, 433 (23.9%) of which had ended in death. Two of the dead were two-month old babies. Tijuana was one of the most seriously affected cities in the country, with 1,216 reported cases on 10 May and 274 deaths. Mexicali had 942 cases and 96 deaths; Ensenada had 118 cases and 14 deaths (including one in San Quintin); Tecate reported 118 cases and 15 deaths; Rosarito Beach Municipality had 36 cases and 3 deaths. The first infection was reported on 17 March and 10 April had the highest report for a single day. Bonilla ordered non-essential businesses to close on 31 March and starting 7 April the state had a stay-at-home order, enforced through police checkpoints. Rent payments were suspended during April and May, and border crossings to and from the United States were limited. Despite stay-at-home orders, many factories continued to function, some after being closed by the state. Bonilla said they prefieren sacrificar a sus trabajadores antes que sus utilidades ("prefer to sacrifice their employees than their profits"). Among the companies cited were Clover (cell-phone repairs), Amphenol (fiber optics), Safran (commercial aircraft interiors), ABC Aluminium Solutions, TE Connectivity (electronics), and Turbotech.

Bonilla sought election as one of Baja California's senators in the 2024 Senate election, occupying the first place on the Labour Party's two-name formula. He, alongside the Labour Party, came in 5th place, with 5% of the vote.

Senate of the Republic (Mexico)
Preceded by Ernesto Ruffo Appel	Senator for Baja California; 2018	Succeeded by Gerardo Novelo Osuna
Political offices
Preceded by Francisco Vega de Lamadrid	Governor of Baja California; 2019–2021	Succeeded by Marina del Pilar Ávila Olmeda
