= Bernardo Borbón Vilches =

Mexican politician

- Born: 3 July 1941; Etchojoa, Sonora, Mexico
- Died: 24 March 2020 (aged 78)
- Occupation: Politician
- Political party: PAN

Bernardo Borbón Vilches (Note: In this Hispanic American name, the first or paternal surname is Borbón and the second or maternal family name is Vilches.) (3 July 1941 – 24 March 2020) was a Mexican politician from the National Action Party (PAN). From 2000 to 2003 he served as a plurinominal deputy during the 58th Congress; during his congressional term, his alternate was Gina Cruz Blackledge. He had previously served in the XIII Legislature of the Congress of Baja California (1989–1992).

Borbón Vilches died of cancer on 24 March 2020.
