= Senator Chavez (disambiguation) =

Dennis Chávez (1888–1962) was a U.S. Senator from New Mexico from 1935 to 1962. Senator Chavez may also refer to:

- Andrea Chávez (born 1997), Senate of Mexico
- Fabian Chavez Jr. (1924–2013), New Mexico Senate
- Martin Chávez (born 1952), New Mexico State Senate
