= Lilly Téllez =

Mexican journalist and senator

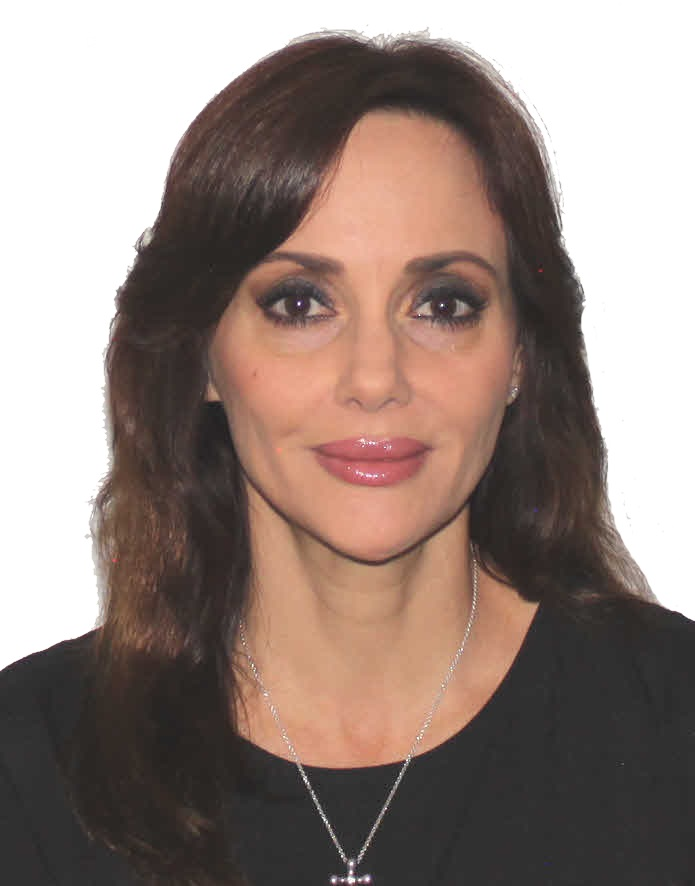

Senator of the Republic Proportional representation
- Incumbent
- Assumed office 1 September 2024

Senator for Sonora
- In office 1 September 2018 – 31 August 2024 Serving with Alfonso Durazo and Sylvana Beltrones Sánchez
- Preceded by: Anabel Acosta Islas
- Succeeded by: Lorenia Valles Sampedro

Personal details
- Born: María Lilly del Carmen Téllez García; 14 November 1967 (age 58) Hermosillo, Sonora, Mexico
- Party: National Action Party (2020–present)
- Other political affiliations: National Regeneration Movement (representing; 2018–2020)
- Occupation: Journalist

María Lilly del Carmen Téllez García (born 14 November 1967), professionally known as Lilly Téllez, is a Mexican politician and journalist. She served as a senator for Sonora from 2018 to 2024, initially representing Morena before joining the National Action Party (PAN) in 2020. In the 2024 general election, she was re-elected to the Senate as one of the PAN's senators-at-large. She previously worked as a journalist for television broadcaster TV Azteca.

== Career ==
=== As a journalist ===
Téllez was born in Hermosillo but spent her childhood in Ensenada, Baja California. From 1984 to 1994, she worked at Canal 6 in Hermosillo, where she received the State Journalism Award in 1992. In 1994, she was hired to host the morning edition of TV Azteca's main news program, Hechos, and to be an investigative journalist. In 1999, she became a full-time investigative journalist.

On 22 June 2000, her car was shot by a group of unknown men, but she was unharmed. She attributed this attack to a recent airing of an investigation related to the Arellano Félix family of drug dealers; the case was closed with no suspects found. In 2005, she began a new investigative program for Azteca Trece, Mitos y Hechos (Myths and Facts), broadcast twice a month. The program came to an end when TV Azteca, evidently ceding to government pressure, did not air the third part of a report on the sale of Grupo Financiero Banamex to Citigroup and the controversy surrounding the winding down of the Fobaproa bank contingency fund.

In 2007, Téllez received the Premio Antena award from the National Chamber of the Radio and Television Industry (CIRT) for her broadcasting career. In 2010, she debuted the program Diagnóstico reservado (Diagnosis Reserved) on Proyecto 40. Téllez later left TV Azteca to write columns and make video content for the digital news site SDP Noticias.

=== Election as senator ===
In November 2017, Andrés Manuel López Obrador contacted Téllez and offered to run her as a Senate candidate from his National Regeneration Movement (Morena) party from the state of Sonora. Two months later, Téllez announced in an interview with Ciro Gómez Leyva on Radio Fórmula that she would take up the offer, though she would not become a Morena party member. She would run alongside Alfonso Durazo Montaño, a longtime politician and public official in the state, as the Juntos Haremos Historia coalition candidates for Senate from Sonora. The ticket obtained 200,000 more votes than the PRI ticket, putting it in first place and securing seats for Téllez and Durazo in the Senate.

In August 2018, Téllez announced she would file an injunction against several constitutional reforms approved in the Sonora state government that reduce the power of the state legislature. Opposition to these reforms, which Téllez described as a "dictatorial smackdown by Governor Claudia Pavlovich Arellano", has been particularly vociferous within Morena, as the party won 20 of the 21 district seats in the Sonoran state legislature in the 2018 midterm elections.

On 16 December 2019, the Comisión de Justicia (Justice Commission) of Morena demanded the expulsion of Lilly Téllez from her position as a member of the party's Senate caucus, primarily due to her opposition to the legalization of abortion. On 3 June 2020, Téllez joined the National Action Party.

Téllez García unsuccessfully sought re-election as one of Sonora's senators in the 2024 Senate election, occupying the second place on the Fuerza y Corazón por México coalition's two-name formula; she was, however, elected as one of PAN's national-list senators for the 2024–2030 term.

== Personal life ==
Téllez was married in 2003 to businessman Guillermo Calderón Villalobos in Mexico City, whom she then divorced.
