= Manuel de Esesarte =

Mexican politician

- Born: 6 January 1961 (age 65); Mexico City, Mexico
- Occupation: Politician
- Political party: PRI

Manuel Esteban de Esesarte Pesqueira (born 6 January 1961) is a Mexican politician from the Institutional Revolutionary Party (PRI). In the 2009 mid-terms he was elected to the Chamber of Deputies to represent the eighth district of Oaxaca during the 61st Congress.
