= Hugo Jarquín =

Mexican politician

- Born: 1 June 1966 (age 59); Oaxaca, Oaxaca, Mexico
- Occupation: Deputy
- Political party: PRD
- Website: http://hugojarquin.com/

Hugo Jarquín (born 1 June 1966) is a Mexican politician affiliated with the Party of the Democratic Revolution (PRD). In the 2012 general election he was elected to the Chamber of Deputies to represent the eighth district of Oaxaca during the 62nd Congress.
