= 8th federal electoral district of Oaxaca =

Federal electoral district of Mexico

Oaxaca's 8th
- Electoral district of the Chamber of Deputies of Mexico

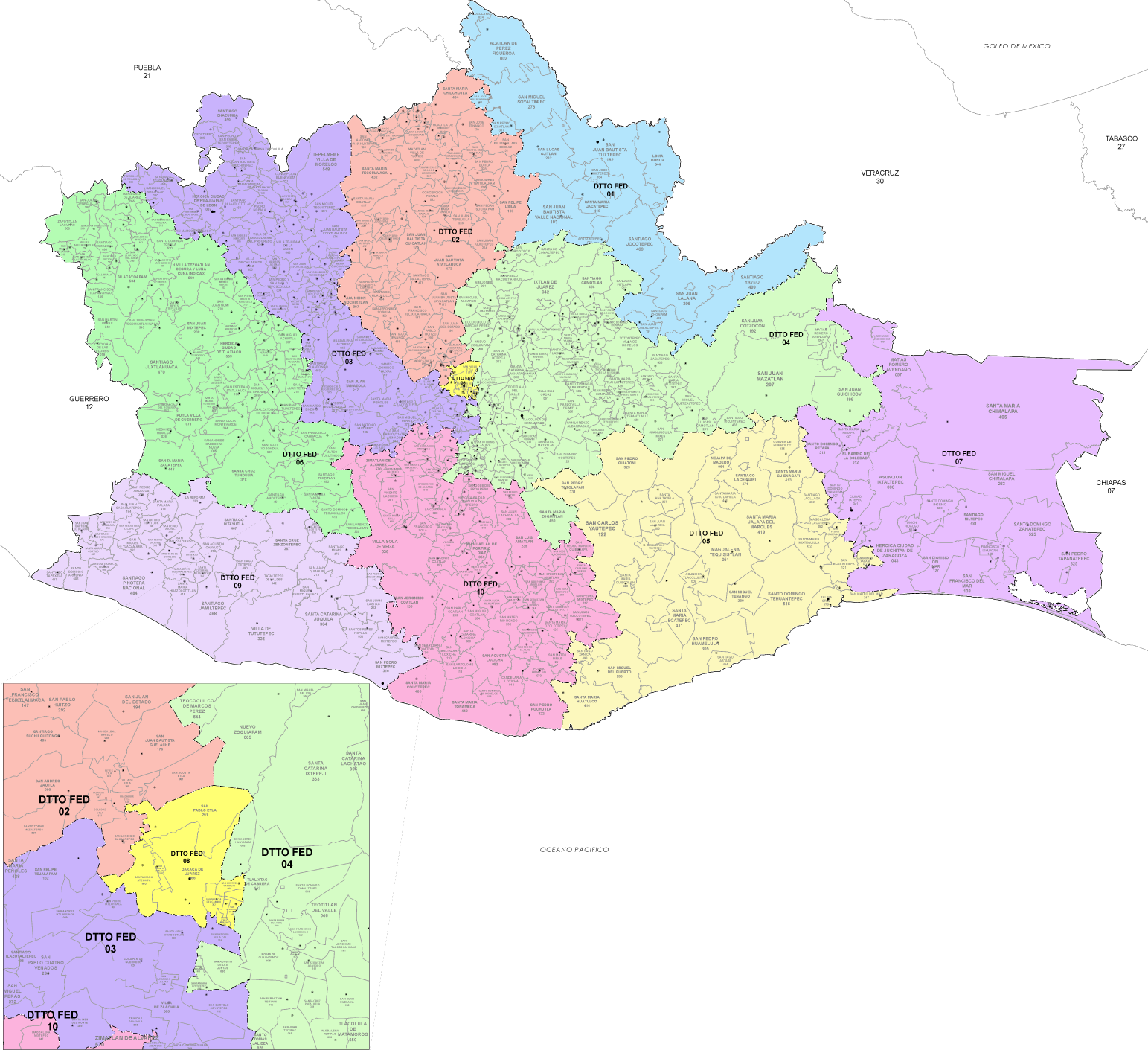
- 8th district

Incumbent
- Member: Raúl Bolaños Cacho Cué
- Party: ▌Ecologist Green Party
- Congress: 66th (2024–2027)

District
- State: Oaxaca
- Head town: Oaxaca de Juárez
- Coordinates: 17°03′N 96°43′W
- Covers: 8 municipalities
- PR region: Third
- Precincts: 216
- Population: 430,659 (2020 census)
- Indigenous: Yes (43%)

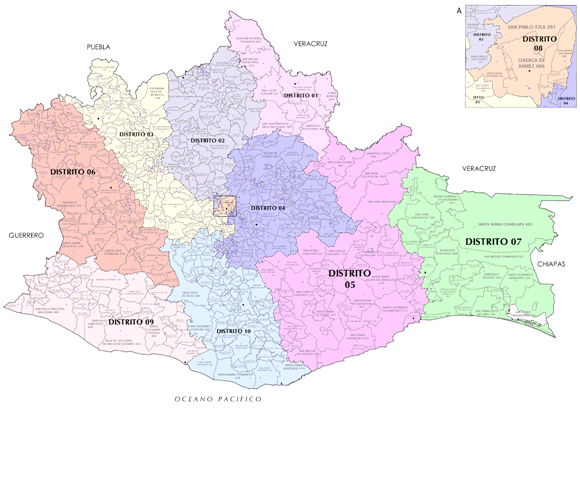
Oaxaca under the 2017–2022 districting plan

The 8th federal electoral district of Oaxaca (Spanish: Distrito electoral federal 08 de Oaxaca) is one of the 300 electoral districts into which Mexico is divided for elections to the federal Chamber of Deputies and one of 10 such districts in the state of Oaxaca.

It elects one deputy to the lower house of Congress for each three-year legislative period by means of the first-past-the-post system. Votes cast in the district also count towards the calculation of proportional representation ("plurinominal") deputies elected from the third region.

The current member for the district, elected in the 2024 general election, is Raúl Bolaños Cacho Cué of the Ecologist Green Party of Mexico (PVEM).

== District territory ==
Under the 2023 districting plan adopted by the National Electoral Institute (INE), which is to be used for the 2024, 2027 and 2030 federal elections, the 8th district covers 216 precincts (secciones electorales) across eight municipalities in the central part of the state. (Note: Oaxaca accounts for 3.3% of the country's population and 4.8% of its surface area, but it contains almost a quarter of its municipalities: 570 out of 2,446 as of 2022.)

The head town (cabecera distrital), where results from individual polling stations are gathered together and tallied, is the state capital, the city of Oaxaca de Juárez. The district reported a population of 430,659 in the 2020 census and, with Indigenous and Afrodescendent inhabitants accounting for over 43% of that total, it is classified by the INE as an indigenous district. (Note: The INE deems any local or federal electoral district where Indigenous or Afrodescendent inhabitants number 40% or more of the population to be an indigenous district. In the 2023 scheme, Oaxaca's 10 federal districts and 25 local districts are all indigenous.)

== Previous districting schemes ==
Evolution of electoral district numbers
	1974	1978	1996	2005	2017	2023
Oaxaca	9	10	11	11	10	10
Chamber of Deputies	196	300				

2017–2022

Oaxaca's 11th district was dissolved in the 2017 redistricting process. Under the 2017 to 2022 scheme, the 8th district had its head town at the city of Oaxaca and it covered seven municipalities.

2005–2017

Between 2005 and 2017, the district's head town was at the city of Oaxaca and it comprised four municipalities.

1996–2005

Between 1996 and 2017, Oaxaca's seat allocation was increased to 11. Under the 1996 districting plan, the head town was at the city of Oaxaca and it covered 24 municipalities.

1978–1996

The districting scheme in force from 1978 to 1996 was the result of the 1977 electoral reforms, which increased the number of single-member seats in the Chamber of Deputies from 196 to 300. Under that plan, Oaxaca's seat allocation rose from nine to ten. The 8th district had its head town at Santiago Pinotepa Nacional in the state's Costa Chica region.

== Deputies returned to Congress ==
(Mexico) National parties
- Current
- PAN
- PRI
- PT
- PVEM
- MC
- Morena
- PAZ
- Somos
- Defunct or local only
- PLM
- PNR
- PRM
- PNM
- PP
- PPS
- PARM
- PFCRN
- CON
- PANAL
- PSD
- PES
- PES
- PRD

Oaxaca's 8th district
Election	Deputy	Party	Term	Legislature
1916	None		1916–1917	Constituent Congress of Querétaro
1917	Severiano Avendaño		1917–1918	27th Congress
1918	Adalberto Lazcano Carrasco		1918–1920	28th Congress
1920	Adalberto Lazcano Carrasco		1920–1922	29th Congress
1922	José Pérez Acevedo	PLCE	1922–1924	30th Congress
1924	Rafael E. Melgar		1924–1926	31st Congress
1926	Rafael E. Melgar		1926–1928	32nd Congress
1928	Rafael E. Melgar	PSO	1928–1930	33rd Congress
1930	Alfonso Francisco Ramírez		1930–1932	34th Congress
...
1979	Norberto Aguirre Palancares	Institutional Revolutionary Party	1979–1982	51st Congress
1982	Pedro Salinas Guzmán	Institutional Revolutionary Party	1982–1985	52nd Congress
1985	Oswaldo García Criollo	Institutional Revolutionary Party	1985–1988	53rd Congress
1988	Cirila Sánchez Mendoza	Institutional Revolutionary Party	1988–1991	54th Congress
1991	Nahum Ildefonso Zorrilla Cuevas	Institutional Revolutionary Party	1991–1994	55th Congress
1994	Tomás Baños Baños	Institutional Revolutionary Party	1994–1997	56th Congress
1997	Alfonso Gómez Sandoval	Institutional Revolutionary Party	1997–2000	57th Congress
2000	Pablo Arnaud Carreño	National Action Party (Mexico)	2000–2003	58th Congress
2003	Javier Villacaña Jiménez	Institutional Revolutionary Party	2003–2006	59th Congress
2006	José Luis Varela Lagunas	Citizens' Movement (Mexico)	2006–2009	60th Congress
2009	Manuel de Esesarte Pesqueira	Institutional Revolutionary Party	2009–2012	61st Congress
2012	Hugo Jarquín	Party of the Democratic Revolution	2012–2015	62nd Congress
2015	Francisco Martínez Neri (Note: Martínez Neri sat as an independent after 2 July 2018.)	Party of the Democratic Revolution Independent politician	2015–2018	63rd Congress
2018	Benjamín Robles Montoya	Labour Party (Mexico)	2018–2021	64th Congress
2021	Benjamín Robles Montoya	Labour Party (Mexico)	2021–2024	65th Congress
2024	Raúl Bolaños Cacho Cué	Ecologist Green Party of Mexico	2024–2027	66th Congress

== Presidential elections ==
Oaxaca's 8th district
Election	District won by	Party or coalition	%
2018	Andrés Manuel López Obrador	Juntos Haremos Historia	67.8272
2024	Claudia Sheinbaum Pardo	Sigamos Haciendo Historia	63.7407
