= Raúl Bolaños Cacho Cué =

Mexican politician (born 1988)

- Bolaños Cacho in 2019

President of the Chamber of Deputies of Mexico
- Incumbent
- Assumed office 1 September 2026
- Preceded by: Kenia López Rabadán

Member of the Chamber of Deputies
- Incumbent
- Assumed office 1 September 2024
- Preceded by: Benjamín Robles Montoya
- Constituency: Oaxaca's 8th

Personal details
- Born: 2 June 1988 (age 38) Oaxaca de Juárez, Oaxaca, Mexico
- Party: Ecologist Green Party of Mexico
- Parent: Raúl Bolaños Cacho Guzmán (father)
- Relatives: Raúl Bolaños-Cacho Güendulain (grandfather)

Raúl Bolaños Cacho Cué (Note: In this Mexican name, the surname is Bolaños Cacho and the second or maternal family name is Cué.) (born 2 June 1988) is a Mexican politician affiliated with the Ecologist Green Party of Mexico (PVEM). He is a native of the city of Oaxaca.

From 2018 to 2024, he was a member of the Senate, occupying Oaxaca's third seat. In the 2024 general election, he was elected to the Chamber of Deputies to represent Oaxaca's 8th district. In August 2026, he was elected to serve as president of the Chamber of Deputies during the third year of the 66th Congress (2026–2027).

== Family ==
- Raúl Bolaños Cacho Guzmán, father, federal deputy and president of the Superior Court of Justice of Oaxaca.
- Raúl Bolaños-Cacho Güendulain, grandfather, federal deputy and senator.
