= José Luis Varela Lagunas =

Mexican politician

- Born: 21 December 1946 (age 79); Oaxaca, Mexico
- Occupation: Politician
- Political party: MC ( –2010)

José Luis Varela Lagunas (born 21 December 1946) is a Mexican politician formerly affiliated with the Convergencia.

In the 2006 general election he was elected to the Chamber of Deputies to represent the eighth district of Oaxaca during the 60th Congress.

He resigned his party membership in June 2010.
