= Clemente Castañeda Hoeflich =

Mexican politician (born 1972)

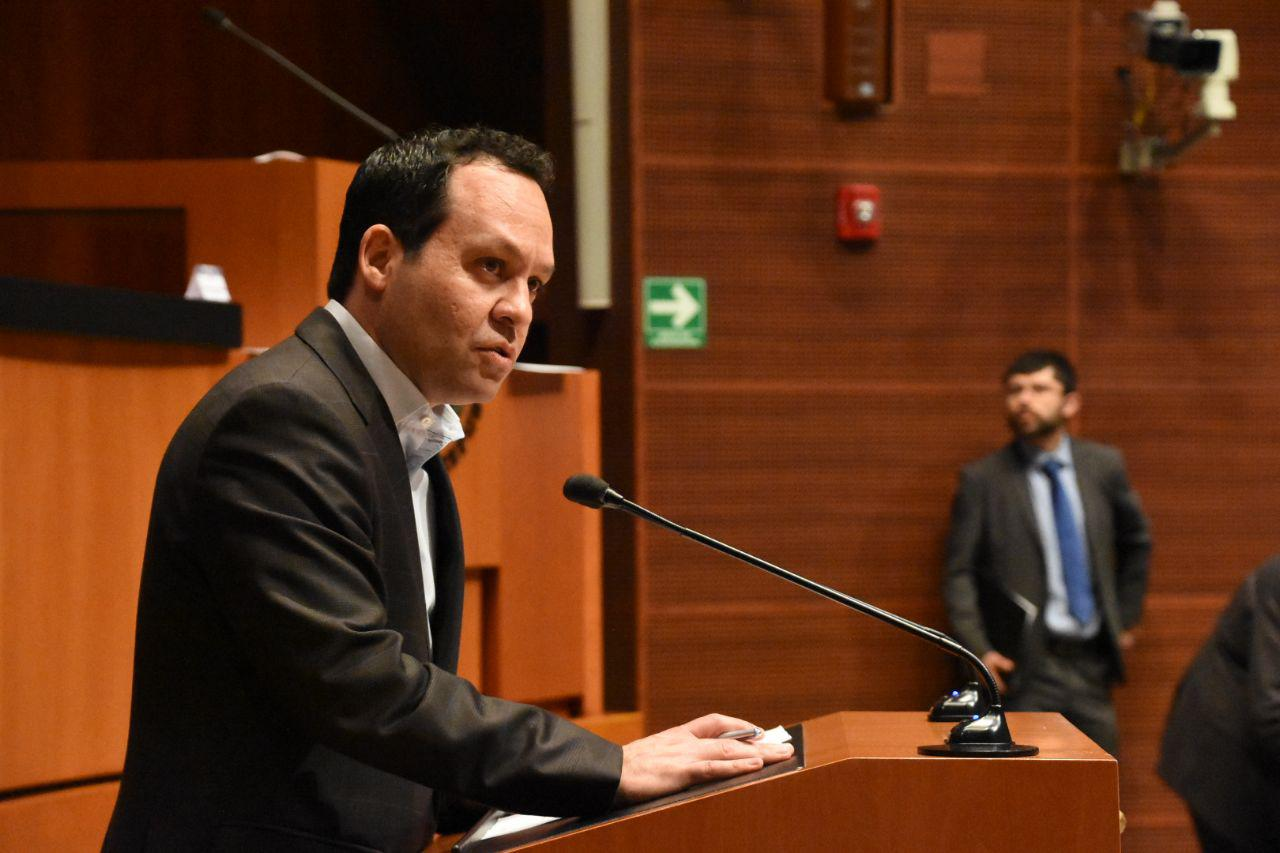
- Castañeda Hoeflich in 2018

Senator of the Republic Proportional representation
- Incumbent
- Assumed office 1 September 2024

Senator of the Republic from Jalisco First formula
- In office 1 June 2021 – 31 August 2024
- Preceded by: José Alberto Galarza Villaseñor
- Succeeded by: Carlos Lomelí Bolaños
- In office 1 September 2018 – 2 September 2020
- Preceded by: María Verónica Martínez Espinoza
- Succeeded by: José Alberto Galarza Villaseñor

National Coordinator of Citizens' Movement
- In office 3 December 2018 – 4 December 2021
- Preceded by: Dante Delgado Rannauro
- Succeeded by: Dante Delgado Rannauro

Member of the Chamber of Deputies Proportional representation
- In office 1 September 2015 – 6 February 2018
- Succeeded by: Salvador García González

Member of the Congress of Jalisco Proportional representation
- In office 1 February 2013 – 25 August 2015

Personal details
- Born: 11 March 1972 (age 54) Guadalajara, Jalisco, Mexico
- Party: Citizens' Movement
- Education: University of Guadalajara; The New School
- Occupation: Politician

José Clemente Castañeda Hoeflich (born 11 March 1972) is a Mexican politician, former national coordinator of the Movimiento Ciudadano party, is the current coordinator of the Movimiento Ciudadano bench in the Senate and senator from Jalisco since 2018.

Before being a senator, Clemente Castañeda was a local deputy and coordinator of his party's caucus from 2012 to 2015 and later he was a federal deputy and leader of his party's caucus from 2015 to 2018, all this with Movimiento Ciudadano.

== Personal life ==
He was born on March 11, 1972, in Guadalajara, the son of Rosalba Hoeflich and Clemente Castañeda Valencia, a university teacher and founding member of the PRD Jalisco.

He studied at High School 5 of the University of Guadalajara, where he was president of the Student Committee and President of the Student Society. He earned his bachelor's degree in political studies and government at the University of Guadalajara in 1995. Clemente Castañeda has a master's degree in political science and doctoral studies in political science from The New School of New York City.

He is married to Verónica Gutiérrez with whom he has two children: Luciano and Mariela.

== Beginnings in political life ==
From 2007 to 2009 Clemente Castañeda was director of the Technical Body for Metropolitan Affairs of the State of Jalisco in the LVIII Legislature, from 2010 to 2012 he was head of political coordination of the municipality of Tlajomulco de Zúñiga in the state of Jalisco, lastly, in 2012 he was general a coordinator of the campaign for governor of Jalisco of Enrique Alfaro Ramírez.

== Local deputy ==
From 2013 to 2015 he served in the LX Legislature of the Congress of Jalisco. At this stage, he was coordinator of the Citizens' Deputies bench and promoted issues of human rights and indigenous rights, transparency, the fight against corruption, and citizen participation. Here he was President of the Indigenous Affairs Commission and Member of the Metropolitan Affairs and Finance and Budget commissions.

=== Main initiatives ===
- Austerity and Savings Law of the State of Jalisco.
- Reform in Matters of Forced Disappearance.
- Law to Prevent, Eradicate and Repair Torture.

== Federal deputy ==
From 2015 to 2018 he was a multi-member federal deputy to the LXIII Legislature; At this stage, he served as coordinator of the Movimiento Ciudadano bench, secretary of the Governance Commission and of the Radio and Television Commission; in addition to being a member of the Commissions of the Administration Committee, and of Follow-up to the Events that Occurred in Nochixtlán, Oaxaca, on June 19, 2016, of follow-up to the local electoral procedures of the year 2016.

=== Main initiatives ===
- Reform to stop the "automatic pass" from attorney general to attorney general.
- Reform for the protection of airline and mobile phone users.
- Reform for the protection of indigenous languages in telecommunications and for the promotion of indigenous cultural expressions.
