= Miguel Ángel Lucero Olivas =

Mexican politician

Miguel Ángel Lucero Olivas (born April 22, 1971) is a Mexican politician and teacher affiliated with the Labor Party. Since March 5, 2019, he has been a Senator of the Republic in the LXIV Legislature of the Congress of the Union representing the state of Durango.

== Early years ==
Miguel Ángel Lucero Olivas was born on April 22, 1971, in Durango City, Durango, Mexico. He studied for a degree in physical education at the Iguala Teacher Update Center. He served as a high school principal in Durango.

== Political career ==
Lucero Olivas is a member of the Labor Party (PT), in which he held the position of educational coordinator. He was also secretary general of the National Regeneration Movement party in the state of Durango.

In the 2018 federal elections, he was nominated as a substitute for Alejandro González Yáñez, candidate for senator of the Republic for the state of Durango. On March 5, 2019, Lucero Olivas held the seat of first-round senator after González Yáñez requested a license from office to run in the 2019 Durango state election. Within the Senate, he occupies the position of president of the mining and regional development commission.
