= Susana Harp =

Mexican singer and Senator

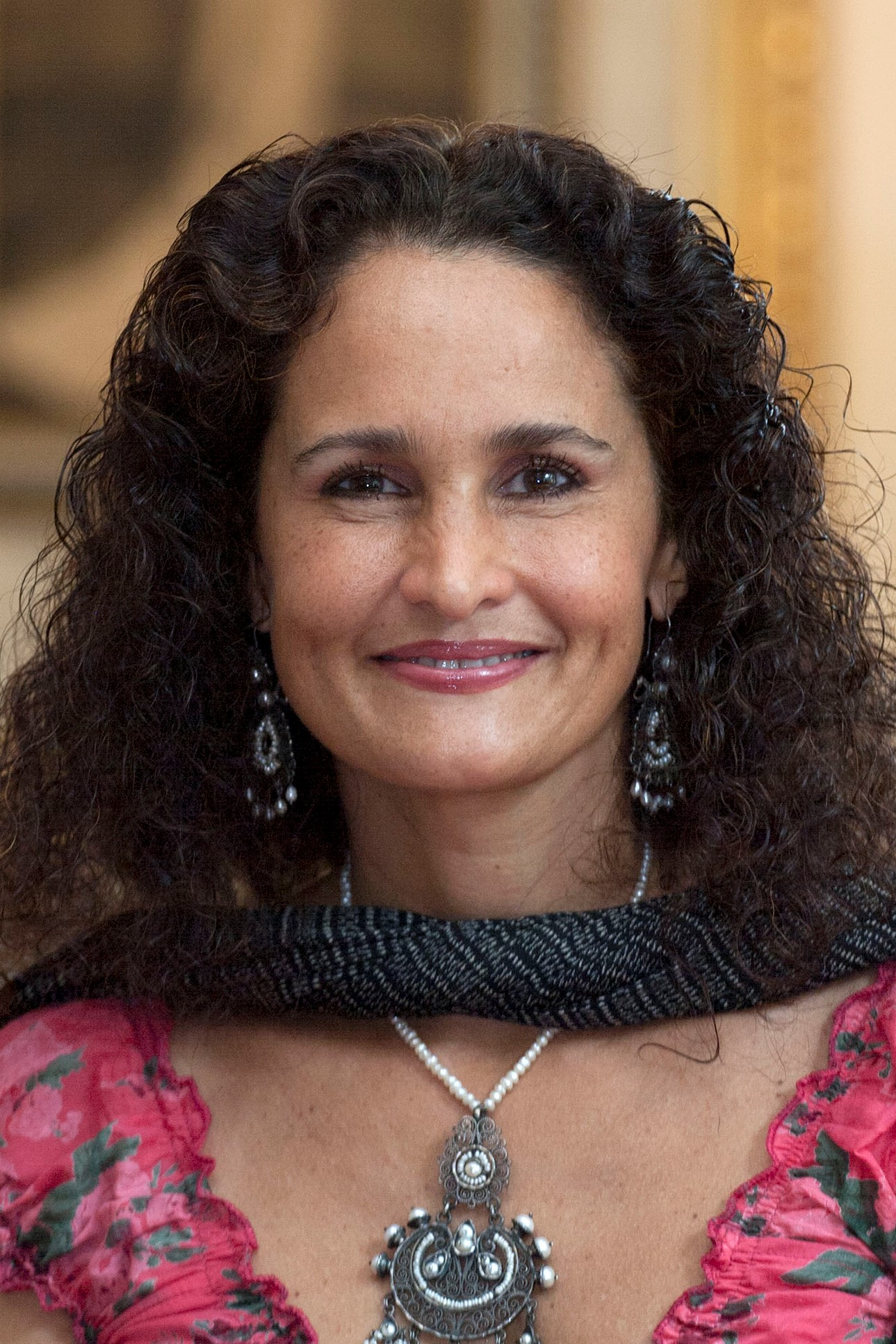

Background information
- Born: April 8, 1968 (age 57)
- Origin: Oaxaca, Oaxaca, Mexico
- Genres: Music of Mexico
- Website: www.susanaharp.com

Senator of the Congress of the Union for Oaxaca
- Incumbent
- Assumed office 1 September 2018 Serving with Adolfo Gómez Hernández and Raúl Bolaños Cacho Cué
- Preceded by: Félix Benjamín Hernández Ruiz

Personal details
- Party: Morena

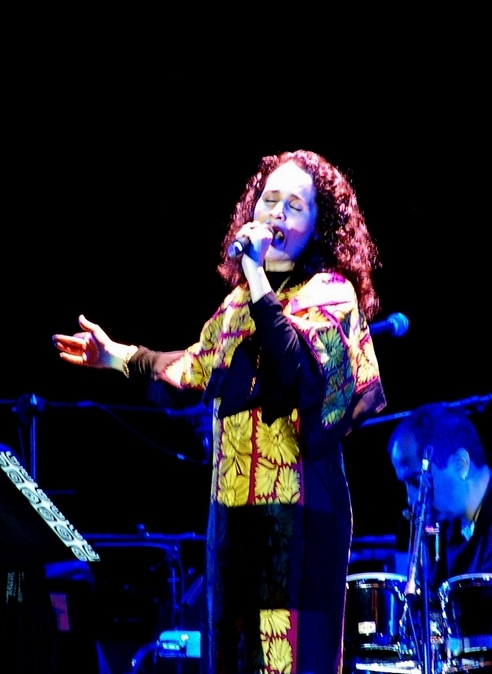
Susana Harp singing in Mexico.

Susana Harp Iturribarria (born April 8, 1968) is a Mexican singer and politician. She currently serves as a senator representing the state of Oaxaca.

== Biography ==
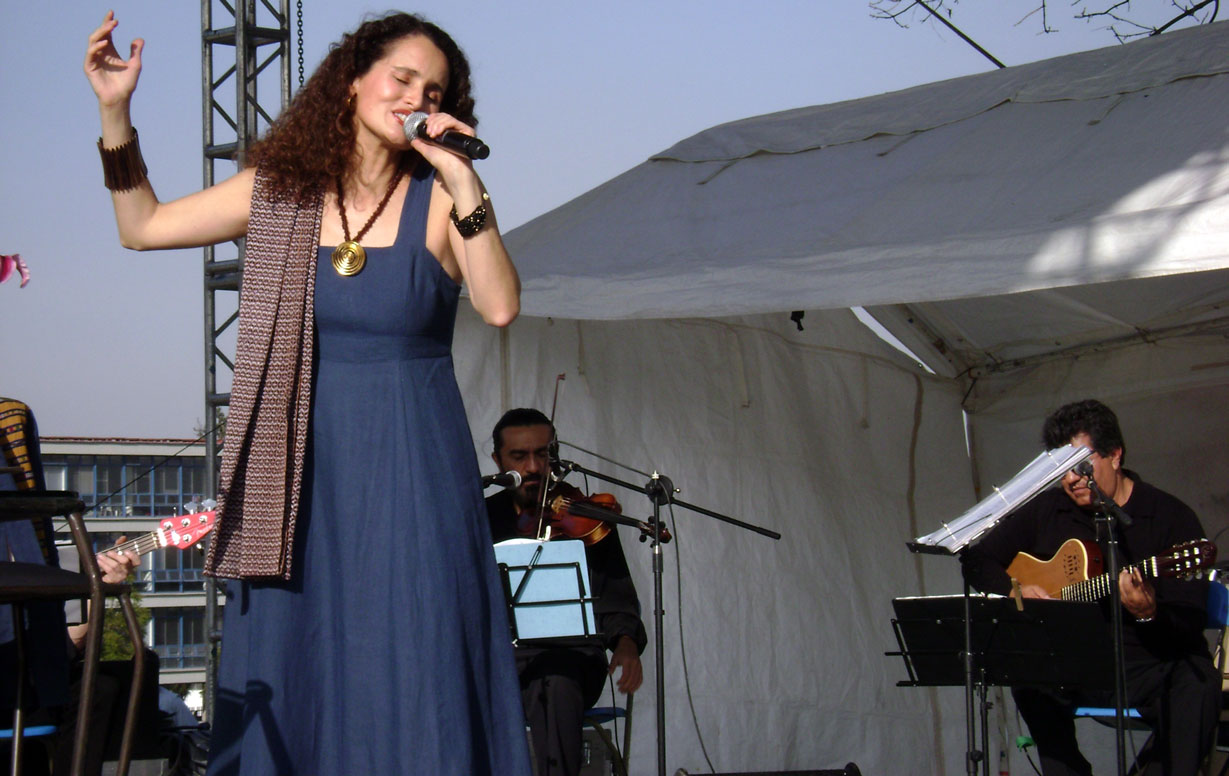
Susana Harp singing

Born in Oaxaca de Juárez, her mother is from Oaxaca and her father is Lebanese, from a very small community in Mexico. In her childhood she was a quiet girl, but always showed interest in music as she was influenced by her grandfather Jorge Fernando Iturribarria. At the age of 16 she started studying singing although she remained focused in her academic career until completing a degree in psychology. At the age of 22 she moved to Mexico City to continue her formal studies followed at Gestalt Psychotherapy and a Masters in NLP. Finally in 1996 she pursued a musical career with a project called "Xquenda" which was her first album with songs in two Mexican languages Otomi and Zapotec, and also in Spanish. As a result the "Xquenda Cultural Association" was founded to support indigenous cultural projects.

== Career ==
Harp has performed in major venues in America and Europe as well as major festivals in Mexico promoting traditional Mexican music. She performs songs in indigenous languages such as Zapotec, Mixtec and Nahuatl as well as Spanish, projecting the culture of marginalized communities through music.

To this date she has eight studio recordings and supports more than 50 cultural projects, both for independent artists and indigenous communities.

== Politics ==
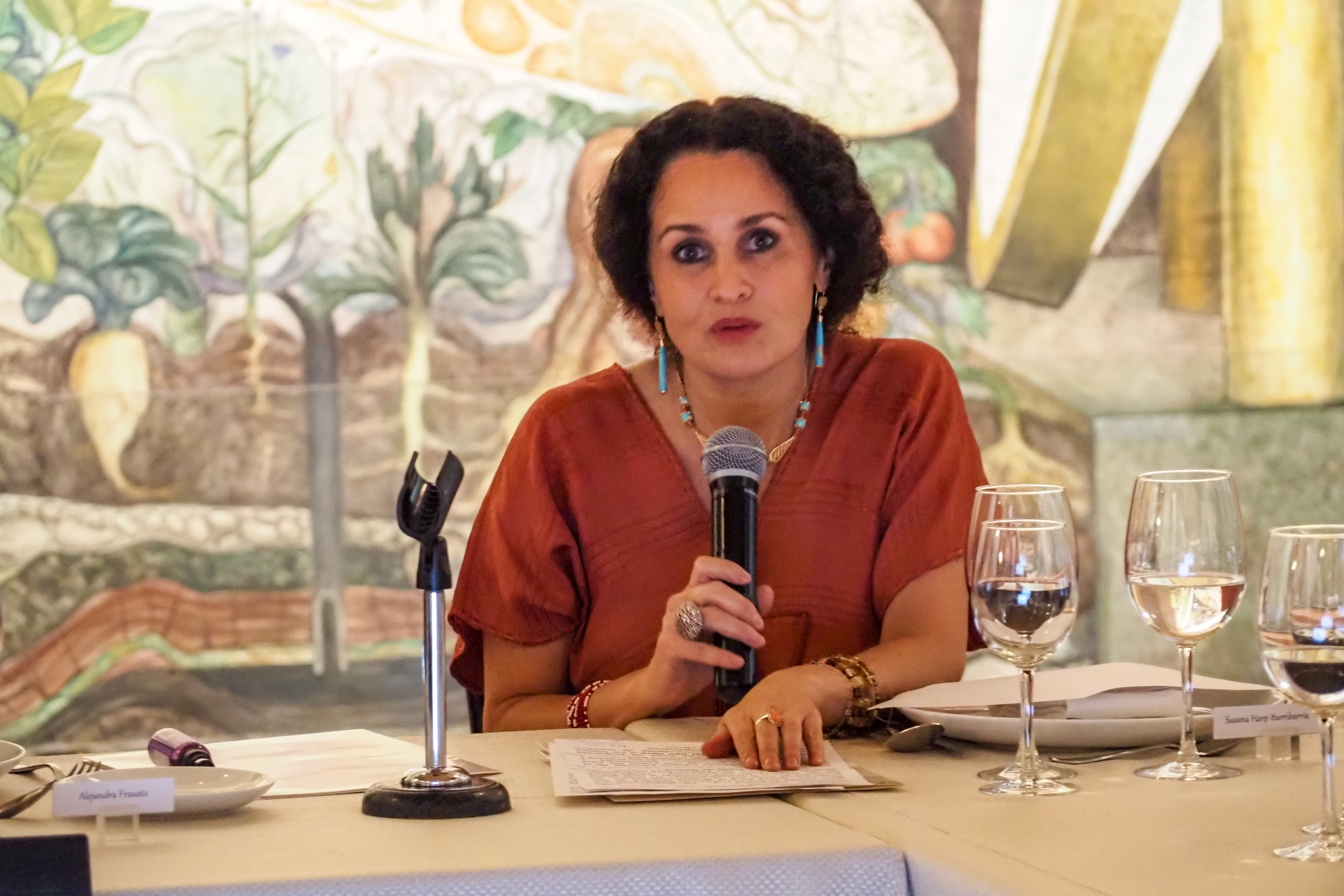
Senator Susana Harp discussing intellectual property rights with WIPO in 2022

In December 2017, Harp accepted an invitation from the National Regeneration Movement to serve as the party's state coordinator in Oaxaca, a position that set her on the path to be on its Oaxaca Senate ticket in 2018. She was elected to the LXIV Legislature of the Mexican Congress and named president of the Culture Commission.

== Discography ==
- 1997 Xquenda.
- 2000 Béele Crúu.
- 2002 Mi Tierra.
- 2003 Arriba del Cielo. (Up the Sky)
- 2005 Ahora. (Now)
- 2008 Fandangos de Ébano. (Ebony Fandangos)
- 2009 De Jolgorios y Velorios. (Of revelry and Wakes)
- 2010 Mi Tierra, Vol II.
- 2014 Misterios gozosos.
