= Pablo Arnaud Carreño =

Mexican politician (born 1947)

- Born: 8 January 1947 (age 79); Oaxaca, Oaxaca, Mexico
- Occupation: Politician
- Political party: PAN (2000–2010); PRI (since 2010)

Pablo Arnaud Carreño (born 8 January 1947) is a Mexican politician from the Institutional Revolutionary Party (PRI) who was formerly aligned with the National Action Party (PAN).

In the 2000 general election he was elected to the Chamber of Deputies to represent the eighth district of Oaxaca for the PAN during the 58th Congress.
