= Marco Antonio Blásquez Salinas =

Mexican politician and journalist

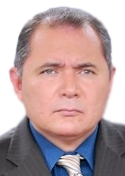
- Born: 7 May 1963 (age 63); Tijuana, Baja California, Mexico
- Occupation: Senator
- Political party: PT

Marco Antonio Blásquez Salinas (born 7 May 1963) is a Mexican politician and journalist affiliated with the PT. He currently serves as Senator of the LXII Legislature of the Mexican Congress representing Baja California. He also was frequent collaborator of El Universal, President of the radio network Media Sport and Vice-president of the Pacific Spanish Network.
