= Vilches =

Vilches may refer to:

- Vilches, Spain, municipality in Jaén, Spain

== People ==
- Christian Vilches (born 1983), Chilean footballer
- Eduardo Vilches (born 1963), Chilean footballer
- Héctor Vilches (born 1926), Uruguayan footballer
- Nimfa C. Vilches (1956–2011), Filipino lawyer and judge
- Raúl Vilches (1954–2022), Cuban volleyball player
