= Celeste Ascencio Ortega =

Mexican politician (born 1993)

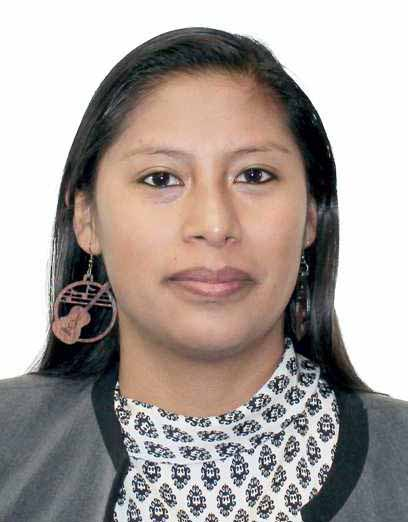
- Ascencio in 2018

Member of the Senate of the Republic
- Incumbent
- Assumed office 1 September 2024
- Constituency: Michoacán

Personal details
- Born: 5 January 1993 (age 33) Uruapan, Michoacán, Mexico
- Party: Morena

Reyna Celeste Ascencio Ortega (born 5 January 1993) is a Mexican politician from the National Regeneration Movement (Morena). In the 2024 general election she was elected to the Senate of the Republic for her home state, Michoacán. From 2018 to 2024 (64th and 65th sessions of Congress), she was a plurinominal member of the Chamber of Deputies.
