= Andrea Chávez =

Mexican politician (born 1997)

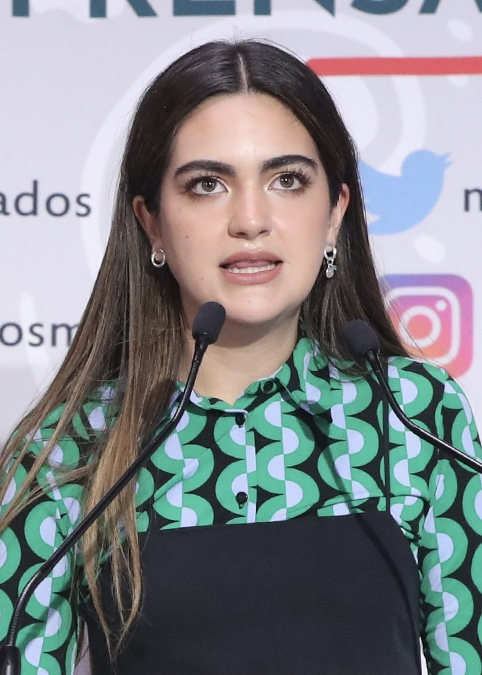
- Chávez in 2021

Member of the Senate of the Republic
- Incumbent
- Assumed office 1 September 2024
- Preceded by: Bertha Caraveo Camarena
- Constituency: Chihuahua

Member of the Chamber of Deputies
- In office 1 September 2021 – 26 February 2024
- Succeeded by: Janeth Yareli Sánchez Cruz
- Constituency: First electoral region

Personal details
- Born: 8 March 1997 (age 29) Ciudad Juárez, Chihuahua, Mexico
- Party: National Regeneration Movement (since 2018)
- Education: Universidad Autónoma de Ciudad Juárez (LLB)

Andrea Chávez Treviño (born 8 March 1997) is a Mexican politician affiliated with the National Regeneration Movement (Morena). She is a native of Ciudad Juárez, Chihuahua.

In the 2024 general election, she was elected to the Senate for the state of Chihuahua (first seat). From 2021 to 2024, she was a plurinominal member of the Chamber of Deputies.
