= Margarita Valdez Martínez =

Mexican politician

Margarita Valdez Martínez (born 31 July 1955) is a Mexican politician affiliated with the National Regeneration Movement (Morena). She studied medicine at the Universidad Juárez del Estado de Durango.

She was elected to the Senate for the state of Durango in the 2018 general election and served during the 64th and 65th Congresses.

Valdez Martínez won re-election as one of Durango's senators in the 2024 Senate election, occupying the second place on the Sigamos Haciendo Historia coalition's two-name formula.
