= Benjamin Blackledge =

Benjamin Blackledge (August 25, 1743 – November 27, 1815) was an American educator and public official. He was the first teacher of English language in Closter, New Jersey, and rose to become "the most prominent man in the northern part of Bergen County". In recognition of his contributions to society, the borough of Closter, in 1998, named a street, Blackledge Court after him.

== Life ==
Benjamin Blackledge was born in Elizabeth, New Jersey, to Philip Blackledge (abt. 1687–1753) and Willempie Sluys (abt. 1690-aft. 1759). As a very young man, he came to Closter on foot to teach the Dutch citizens the King's English. A schoolhouse was built for him by subscription; the house consisted of one instruction room and one room serving as the teacher's quarters. After Blackledge married on April 20, 1770, he and his sixteen-year-old bride lived in this schoolhouse room.

Blackledge's extraordinary skill at penmanship was instrumental in his later appointment to civic office. In 1775, he became the first clerk of Harrington Township, New Jersey. Subsequently, he served as Justice of the Peace and Judge of the County Court of Common Pleas, and was also elected to the assembly of Bergen County, New Jersey. His activities in the legal life of Bergen County were so prolific that many area documents of the late 18th and early 19th century bear his name in some connection.

Blackledge is also said to have built the original (southern) portion of the Blackledge-Kearney House, a site on the National Register of Historic Places located in Palisades Interstate Park. The house was saved from destruction and registered as an historic site in the early 20th century, thanks to the prevalent local legend that the house briefly served as the headquarters of General Charles Cornwallis after his crossing of the Hudson River on the night of November 19–20, 1776. (Modern scholarship, however, has placed the probable landing site over a mile to the south.) While there is no indication that Blackledge himself ever lived in the house, the property was occupied by his daughter, Maria Blackledge, and her husband Daniel Van Sciver (a DAR Patriot) as early as 1802.

Benjamin Blackledge died on November 27, 1815, and was buried in Saucher Tave's Begraven Ground in Demarest, New Jersey, which is also known simply as "Demarest Cemetery", where many members of his family are also interred.

== Family ==
Benjamin Blackledge married Cathalyntie Tallema (April 1, 1754 - October 5, 1836), who was also known by her Anglicized name, Caroline Tallman. They had nine children, most of whom survived to adulthood and had families of their own. Cathalyntie's grandparents, Maritie Haring and Dowe Hermanszen Tallema, also had some local fame. Her grandmother was of the Haring family for whom Harrington Township was named, and her grandfather has been given DAR Patriot status by special distinction, namely through being the oldest recorded person to die in combat during the American Revolution. As told on his monument in Saucher Tave's, at the age of 89, Dowe Tallema was bayonetted by a raiding party of Tories, who attacked his farm on May 10, 1779; he died the next day.
