= Carlos Lomelí Bolaños =

Mexican politician (born 1959)

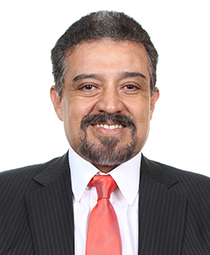
- Born: 5 August 1959 (age 66); Guadalajara, Jalisco, Mexico
- Education: Universidad de Guadalajara
- Occupation: Politician
- Political party: MORENA

Carlos Lomelí Bolaños (born 5 August 1959) is a Mexican politician now affiliated with Morena. He was elected to the Chamber of Deputies in the 2015 mid-terms and to the Senate in the 2024 general election.

== Life ==
Lomelí attended the Universidad de Guadalajara, where he received his degree in surgery and obstetrics, and became an OB/GYN. He also taught at the university's preparatory school number 2.

In 1999, Lomelí became the director general of Lomedic, S.A. de C.V., which began supplying medicine to IMSS clinics in Jalisco. In 2010, this contract earned the company 600 million pesos. Beneficiaries complained about supply issues and other irregularities, prompting the state health secretary to change providers. Lomedic lost the contract to another company, Dimesa, and immediately challenged the results in court. Additionally, at the time, Lomedic was placed by the United States Treasury Department on a list of 10 companies linked to drug trafficking activity; he was removed from this list on 10 January 2012, though a 2017 report returned him to the list and linked him to Raúl Flores Hernández's money laundering operation by way of a company called Servicios Educativos y de Negocios, S.A. de C.V.

In 2011, Lomelí founded another company, Laboratorios SOLFRAN, a Guadalajara-area maker of generic medicines. Together with another company, Abastecedora de Insumos para la Salud, owned by a close political friend of Lomelí, the companies received 307 federal contracts for a total of 883.8 million pesos from 2013 to 2017.

Lomelí was a PRD precandidate for governor in 2006 but ultimately ran for senator and lost; he would run for the Senate again in 2012 with the same result. After the 2012 election, he switched parties to Movimiento Ciudadano, which placed him on its party list for the first electoral region for the 2015 elections and sent him to the Chamber of Deputies. In two and a half years in the federal legislature, he was a secretary on two commissions and sat on four others.

In March 2017, Lomelí changed parties again, switching to Morena, where he was designated the state party's coordinator of organization. In February 2018, he resigned from the Chamber of Deputies in order to run for Governor of Jalisco as the Juntos Haremos Historia coalition candidate. Lomelí finished second with 24.38 percent of the vote, behind winning candidate Enrique Alfaro Ramírez of Movimiento Ciudadano.

Lomelí Bolaños won election as one of Jalisco's senators in the 2024 Senate election, occupying the first place on the Sigamos Haciendo Historia coalition's two-name formula.
