= Jesús Ángel Díaz Ortega =

Mexican politician

- Born: 25 October 1945 (age 80); Oaxaca, Oaxaca, Mexico
- Occupation: Politician
- Political party: PRI

Jesús Ángel Díaz Ortega (born 25 October 1945) is a Mexican politician affiliated with the Institutional Revolutionary Party. As of 2014 he served as Deputy of the LIX Legislature of the Mexican Congress representing Oaxaca.

Preceded by María Luisa Acevedo Conde	Municipal President of Oaxaca; 2004–2007	Succeeded by Manuel de Esearte Esqueira
