= Víctor Hermosillo y Celada =

Mexican politician (born 1939)

- Born: 28 August 1939 (age 86); Mexico City, Mexico
- Occupation: Senator
- Political party: PAN

Víctor Hermosillo y Celada (born 28 August 1939) is a Mexican entrepreneur and politician affiliated with the PAN. He was Senator of the LXII Legislature of the Mexican Congress representing Baja California from 2012 to 2018. He was also Municipal President of Mexicali during the 1998-2001 period.

In the business field, he specialises in industrial design and construction in Mexico. He is the chairman of the company Hermosillo, which he founded in 1963.
