= John Blackledge =

British kickboxer and referee

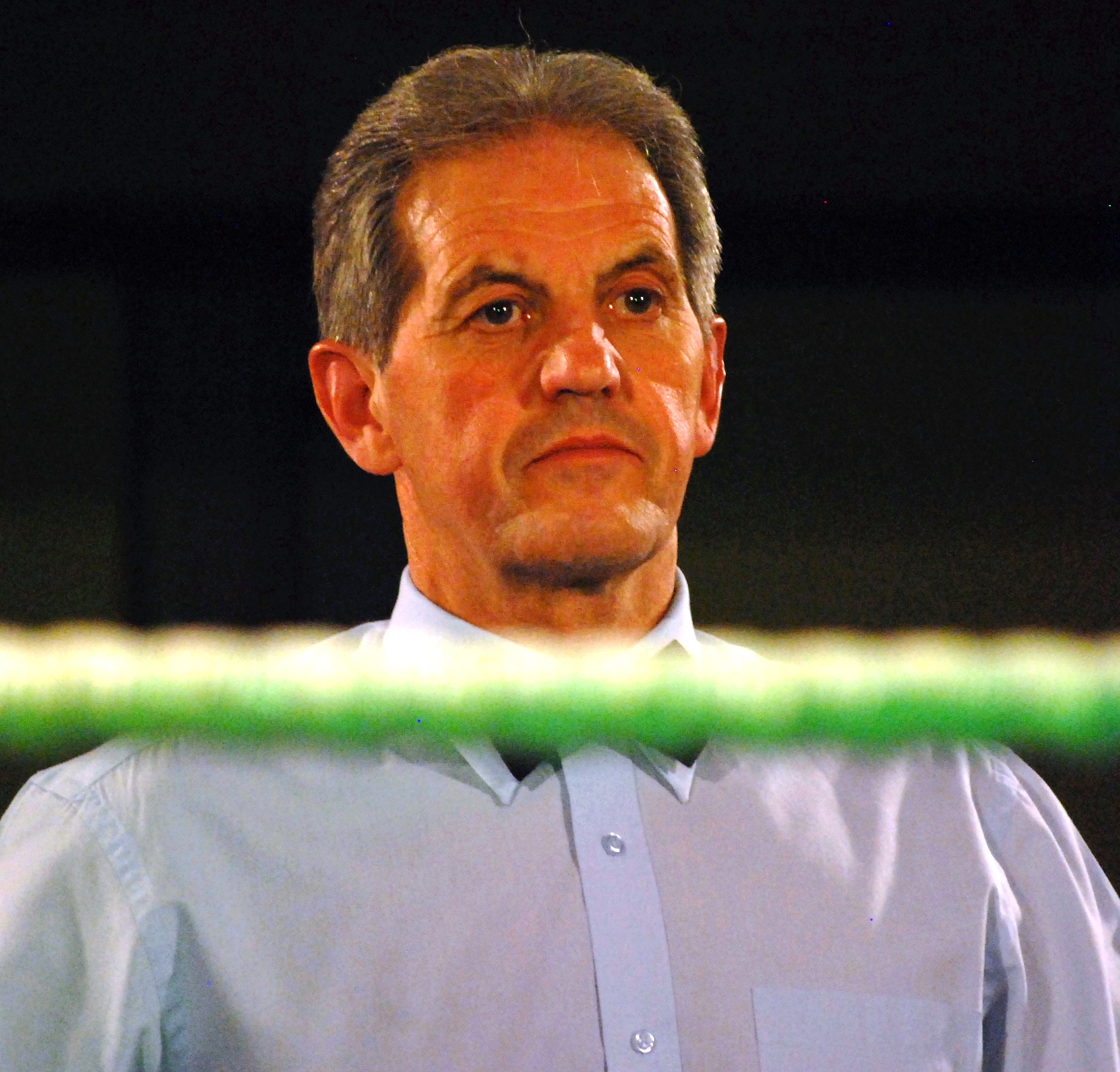
- Blackledge refereeing at Katana 2 'No Mercy' in Glasgow
- Nationality: English
- Style: Pak Mei Kung Fu; Kickboxing; Goju Ryu Karate
- Years active: 1961–1985 Karate; 1965–1975 (Full Contact Karate / Kickboxing); 1972–present (Pak Mei Wu Chi Yun Kung Fu) (1979–present (Professional Referee); 2007–present (ISKA)

Kickboxing record
- Total: 68
- Wins: 58
- Losses: 3
- Draws: 7
- Last updated on: 4 August 2011

John Blackledge is the current ISKA UK National Director of Referees and Officials and a former world champion kickboxer. He is also a 7th Dan in Goju Ryu Karate and a Kung Fu Sifu, specialising in Pak Mei Wu Chi Yun Style after learning under Sifu George Taylor and late Master Lee Chang
