= Blackledge–Kearney House =

Historic house in New Jersey, US

- U.S. National Register of Historic Places
- New Jersey Register of Historic Places
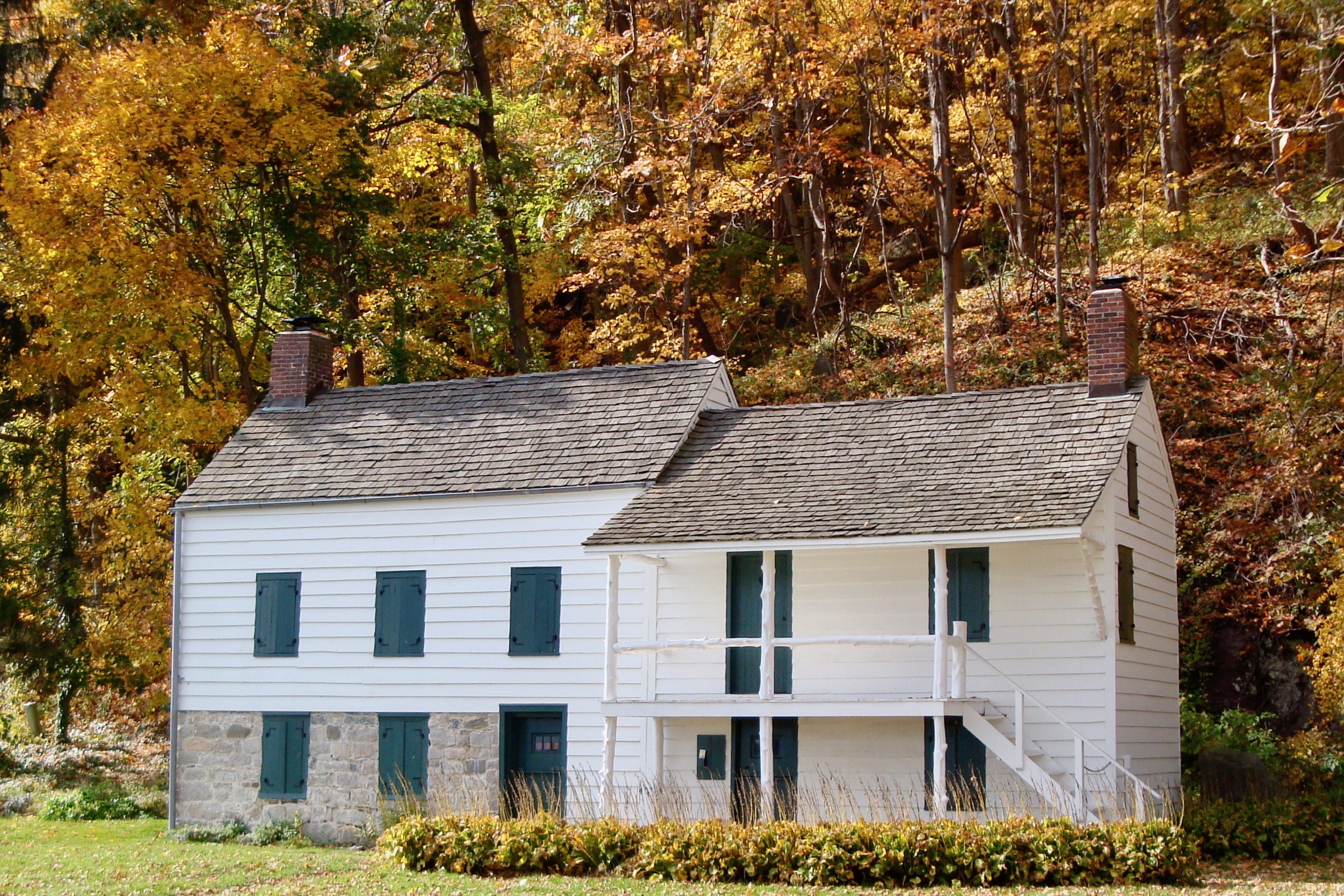
- Blackledge–Kearney House in 2009

- Location within Bergen County, New Jersey Location within New Jersey Location within the United States
- Location: Alpine Landing, Alpine, New Jersey
- Coordinates: 40°56′48.6″N 73°55′8.1″W
- Built: c. 1750
- MPS: Stone Houses of Bergen County TR
- NRHP reference No.: 84002537
- NJRHP No.: 431

Significant dates
- Added to NRHP: July 24, 1984
- Designated NJRHP: October 3, 1980

The Blackledge–Kearney House is located within the Palisades Interstate Park in the borough of Alpine in Bergen County, New Jersey, United States. The historic stone house was built around 1750 and was documented as Cornwallis Headquarters by the Historic American Buildings Survey (HABS) in 1936. It was added to the National Register of Historic Places on July 24, 1984, for its significance in architecture and exploration/settlement. It was listed as part of the Early Stone Houses of Bergen County Multiple Property Submission (MPS). Lord Cornwallis was believed to have used the house as a temporary headquarters during his crossing of the Hudson River (during the Battle of Fort Lee) in 1776, but modern historians dispute this claim.

== History ==
The house was built at Closter Landing in the 1760s. Maria Blackledge, the daughter of Benjamin Blackledge lived in the house with her husband Daniel Van Sciver. The house was purchased in 1817 by James and Rachel Kearney. James died in 1831 and Rachel used the house as a tavern. The house was expanded to accommodate the tavern. In 1907 the house was purchased by the Palisades Interstate Park Commission. The house was used as a police station for the park in the 1920s.

The park now uses the house as a museum known as Kearney House.

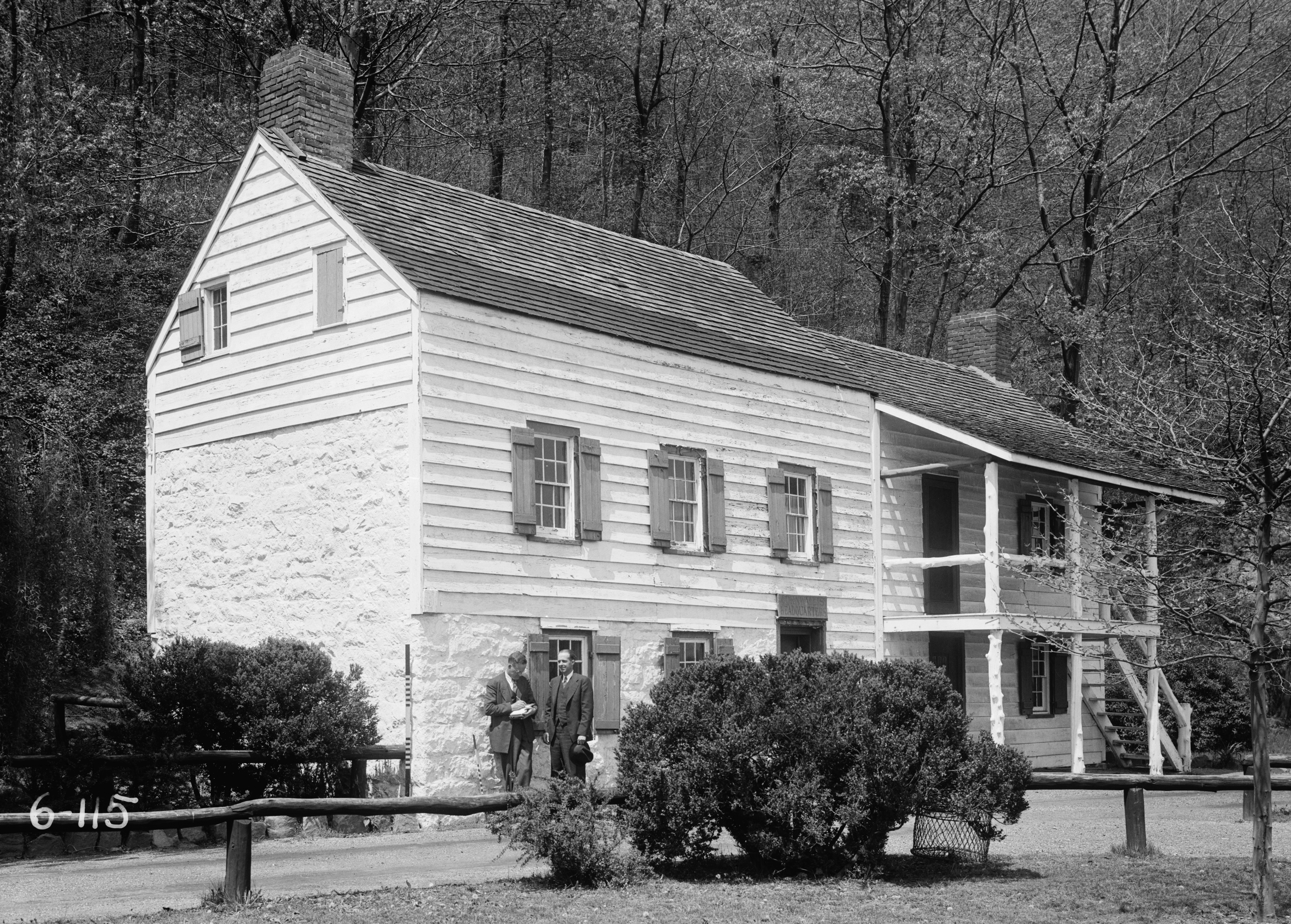
HABS photo from 1936

== See also ==
- National Register of Historic Places listings in Bergen County, New Jersey
- List of the oldest buildings in New Jersey
