= Benjamín Robles Montoya =

Mexican politician

Ángel Benjamín Robles Montoya
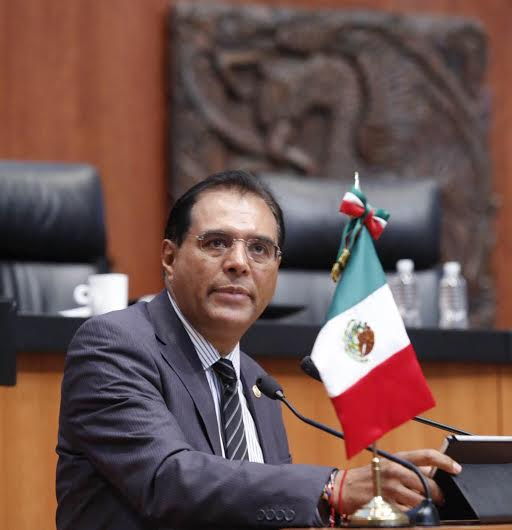
- Robles Montoya in 2015
- Born: 8 November 1959 (age 66); Azcapotzalco, Mexico City, Mexico
- Education: UVM
- Occupation: Politician
- Political party: PT

Ángel Benjamín Robles Montoya (born 8 November 1959) is a Mexican politician affiliated with the Labor Party (PT) who previously belonged to both the Party of the Democratic Revolution (PRD) and Convergencia.

He served as a Senator for Oaxaca during the 62nd Congress (2012 to 2015) for the PRD, and in the Chamber of Deputies from 2018 to 2024 representing the eighth district of Oaxaca for the PT.

He had previously served in the 60th session of the Congress of Oaxaca as the coordinator of the Convergencia bloc.

Robles Montoya sought election as one of Oaxaca's senators in the 2024 Senate election, occupying the first place on the PT's two-name formula. In that contest, however, the PT placed third behind the National Regeneration Movement (Morena) and the Ecologist Green Party of Mexico (PVEM).
