= Laura Esquivel Torres =

Mexican politician, born 1988

Laura Esquivel Torres (born 28 May 1988) is a Mexican politician affiliated with the National Action Party (PAN).

Esquivel Torres was born in Puruándiro, Michoacán, in 1988 and holds a law degree from the Universidad Latina de América in the state capital, Morelia. She has been actively involved in politics since 2006 and began her working life in agencies of the judiciary in her home state.

In the 2024 general election she was elected to the Senate from the PAN's national list.
