= Gerardo Novelo Osuna =

Mexican politician

Senator of the Congress of the Union for Baja California

Owner of Estero Beach Hotel & Resort
- Incumbent
- Assumed office December 6, 2018
- Preceded by: Jaime Bonilla Valdez
- In office 6 December 2018 – 28 March 2022
- Preceded by: Jaime Bonilla Valdez
- Succeeded by: Jaime Bonilla Valdez

Personal details
- Born: Ensenada, Baja California, Mexico
- Party: Morena
- Spouse: Monica Buelna Pesqueira
- Children: Andres Novelo, Hannia Novelo, Ivanna Novelo
- Relatives: Lupita Novelo (sister)
- Occupation: Politician

Gerardo Novelo Osuna is a Mexican businessman and politician. From December 6, 2018, until March 28, 2022, he was a first-format senator of the Republic replacing Jaime Bonilla Valdez in the LXIV Legislature of the Congress of the Union.

== Early years ==
He was born in Ensenada, Baja California, Mexico. He studied business administration at Saddleback College in Mission Viejo, California. He has been an entrepreneur, focused on the hotel industry. He is the brother of Marco Antonio Novelo Osuna, municipal president of Ensenada from 2016 to 2019 for the Institutional Revolutionary Party.

== Senator of the Republic ==
In the 2018 federal elections he was nominated as alternate for Jaime Bonilla Valdez, candidate for senator of the republic for the state of Baja California. After the elections, he obtained the first formula seat. On December 6, 2018, Bonilla Valdez requested a leave of absence from office to run for governor in the 2019 Baja California state elections. Gerardo Novelo Osuna took the senator seat in his place. Within congress he held the position of secretary of the border and immigration affairs committee.

In March 2023, Jaime Bonilla Valdez formally returned to be senator of the republic.
