= 2024 Mexican general election =

- 2 June 2024
- Presidential election
- Opinion polls
- Turnout: 61.05% (▼2.38pp)
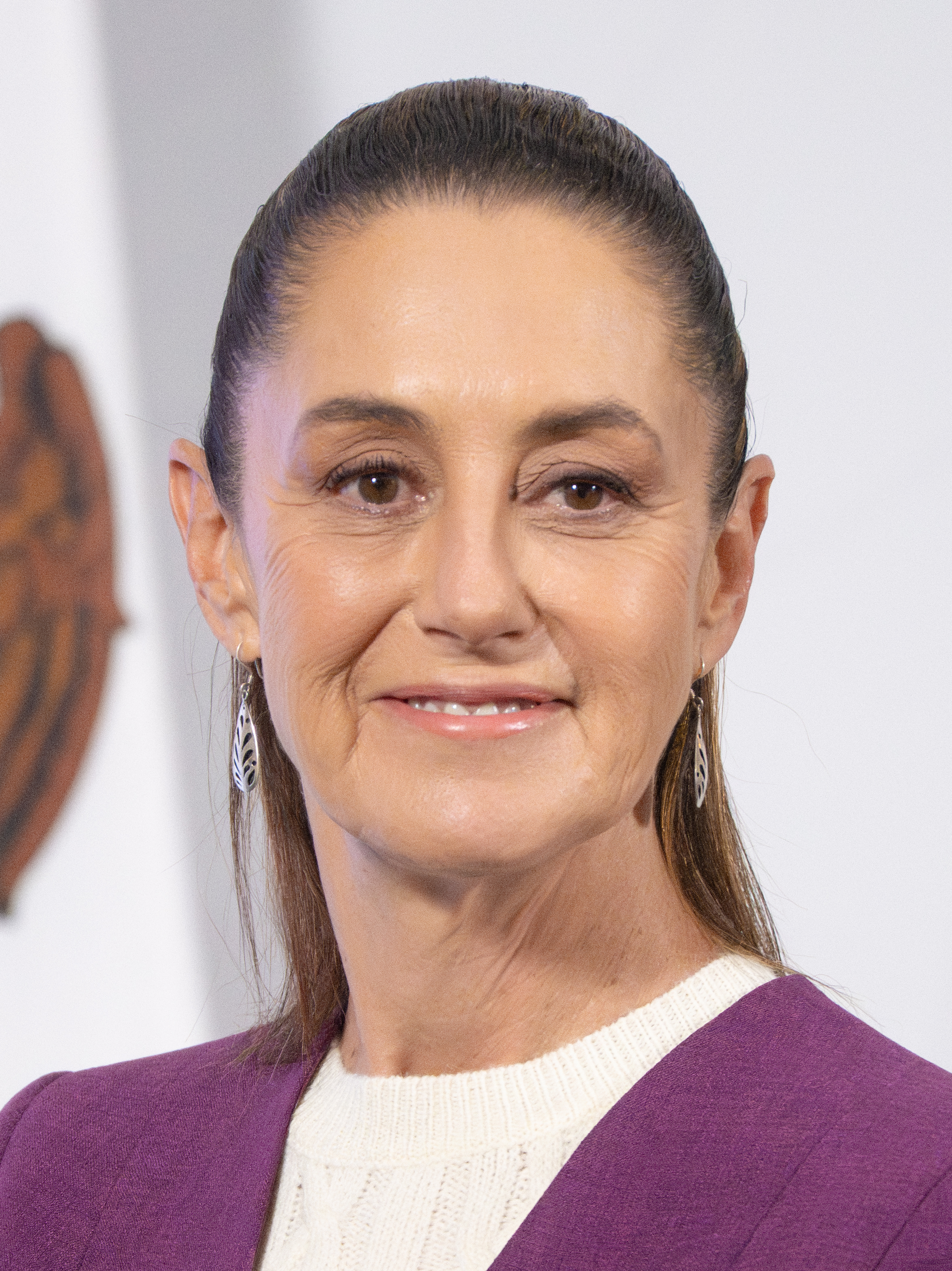

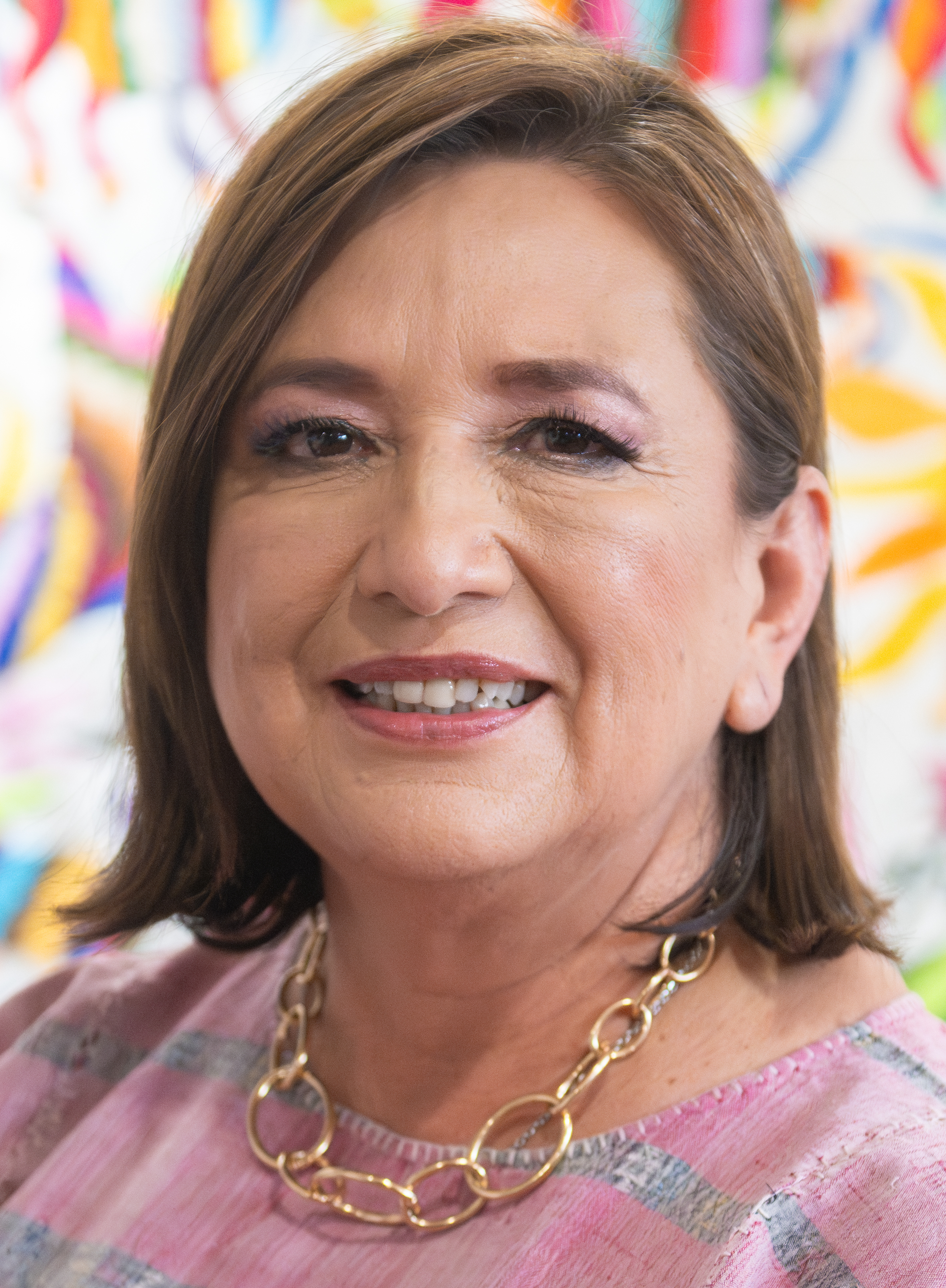

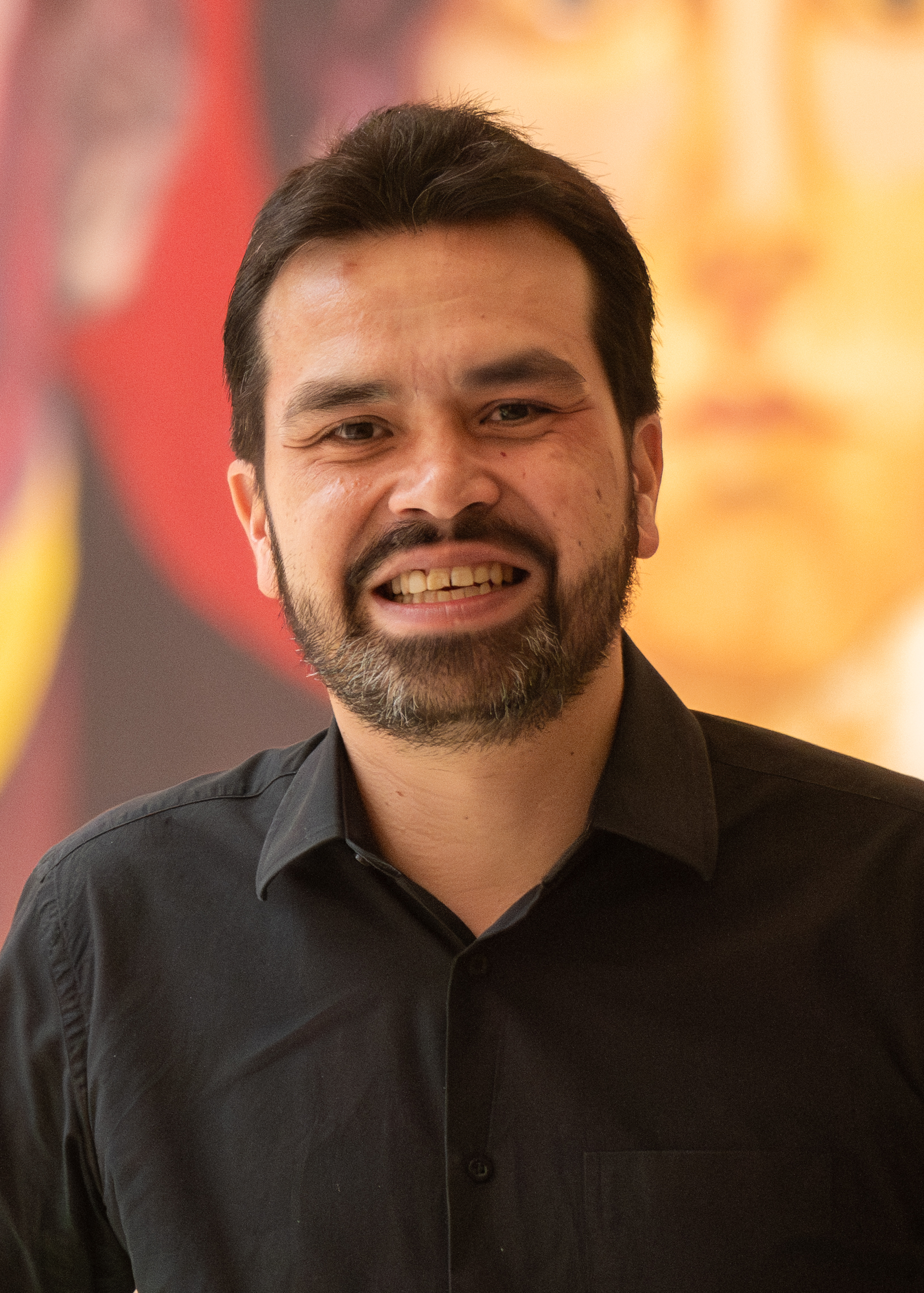
Nominee	Claudia Sheinbaum	Xóchitl Gálvez	Jorge Máynez
Party	MORENA	PAN (Note: Gálvez, while not officially affiliated with the PAN, secured the nomination with the party's support as an external candidate. Additionally, according to the coalition agreement, the constituent parties of Fuerza y Corazón por México recognize the presidential nominee as part of the PAN.)	MC
Alliance	Sigamos Haciendo Historia	Fuerza y Corazón por México
Popular vote	35,924,519	16,502,697	6,204,710
Percentage	61.18%	28.11%	10.57%
- Sheinbaum (60087) Gálvez (10024) Máynez (117) Tie (82) No data (1185)
President before election
Andrés Manuel López Obrador
MORENA
Elected President
Claudia Sheinbaum
MORENA
- Senate
- All 128 seats in the Senate of the Republic; 65 seats needed for a majority
Party	Leader	Vote %	Seats	+/–
Sigamos Haciendo Historia (83 seats)
MORENA	Mario Delgado	42.48	60	+5
PVEM	Karen Castrejón Trujillo	9.30	14	+8
PT	Alberto Anaya	5.58	9	+3
Fuerza y Corazón por México (40 seats)
PAN	Marko Cortés Mendoza	17.54	22	−1
PRI	Alejandro Moreno Cárdenas	11.33	16	+2
PRD	Jesús Zambrano Grijalva	2.36	2	−6
Other (5 seats)
MC	Dante Delgado	11.33	5	−2
This lists parties that won seats. See the complete results below.

- Chamber of Deputies
- All 500 seats in the Chamber of Deputies; 251 seats needed for a majority
Party	Leader	Vote %	Seats	+/–
Sigamos Haciendo Historia (364 seats)
MORENA	Mario Delgado	42.40	236	+38
PVEM	Karen Castrejón Trujillo	8.72	77	+34
PT	Alberto Anaya	5.68	51	+14
Fuerza y Corazón por México (108 seats)
PAN	Marko Cortés Mendoza	17.55	72	−42
PRI	Alejandro Moreno Cárdenas	11.57	35	−35
PRD	Jesús Zambrano Grijalva	2.53	1	−14
Other (28 seats)
MC	Dante Delgado	11.34	27	+4
Independents	–	0.13	1	+1
This lists parties that won seats. See the complete results below.
Results by constituency

General elections were held in Mexico on 2 June 2024. Voters elected a new president to serve a six-year term, all 500 members of the Chamber of Deputies, and all 128 members of the Senate of the Republic. These elections took place concurrently with the 2024 state elections.

Claudia Sheinbaum, a member of the left-wing political party Morena, was widely regarded by her party as the top contender to succeed President Andrés Manuel López Obrador and ultimately secured the nomination of the ruling coalition, Sigamos Haciendo Historia. Xóchitl Gálvez emerged as the frontrunner of Fuerza y Corazón por México following a surge in popularity due to criticisms from López Obrador. Citizens' Movement, the only national party without a coalition, nominated Jorge Máynez. This was the first general election in Mexico's history in which most contenders for the country's presidency were women.

Sheinbaum won the presidential election by a landslide margin of over 33 points, becoming the first woman and the first person of Jewish descent to be elected president of Mexico. She was also the first Jewish woman elected head of state in Latin America. The election saw Sheinbaum receiving the highest number of votes ever recorded for a candidate in Mexican history, surpassing López Obrador's record of 30.1 million votes from 2018. Sheinbaum was officially sworn into office on 1 October 2024.

In the legislative elections, the Sigamos Haciendo Historia coalition won a supermajority in the Chamber of Deputies, securing 73% of the seats, the highest share for a party or coalition since 1982. The alliance fell three seats short of a supermajority in the Senate, but defections by the two senators elected for the PRD on 28 August closed the shortfall to one; the supermajority was ultimately secured with the defection to Morena of Cynthia López, elected for the PRI in Mexico City, on 12 November.

== Background ==
=== Political background ===
In the 2018 election, Andrés Manuel López Obrador, a three-time presidential candidate and founder of the National Regeneration Movement (Morena), ran as the candidate of the Juntos Haremos Historia alliance, which included Morena, the Labor Party (PT), and the Social Encounter Party (PES). He won in a landslide, securing 54.71% of the vote and defeating his closest rival, Ricardo Anaya of the Por México al Frente coalition, by nearly 31 percentage points. The Juntos Haremos Historia alliance also secured majorities in the Chamber of Deputies and the Senate.

As president, López Obrador expanded the Mexican welfare state with programs aimed at the elderly and low-income students, raised the minimum wage significantly, and invested heavily in infrastructure projects such as the Tren Maya and the Felipe Ángeles International Airport. He combatted corruption by implementing austerity measures, including salary caps, budget cuts across the government, and the dismissal of numerous government employees. While his administration achieved a poverty reduction, it faced accusations of democratic backsliding and undermining institutional independence, including frequent attacks on journalists and judges during his morning press conferences and questioning the necessity of independent public agencies such as the INE and INAI. The country’s murder rate fell from 30 per 100,000 people in 2018 when AMLO entered office, to 28 per 100,000 people in 2021 according to World Bank data. Between 2019 and 2023 there was a 15 percent decrease in the number of murders according to public data.

During the 2021 elections, party alliances shifted significantly. The National Action Party (PAN), the Institutional Revolutionary Party (PRI), and the Party of the Democratic Revolution (PRD) formed a big-tent coalition to challenge Morena's growing dominance. While Juntos Hacemos Historia, an alliance of Morena, the PT, and the Ecologist Green Party of Mexico (PVEM), lost its supermajority in the Chamber of Deputies, it achieved significant success in local elections, flipping numerous governorships.

López Obrador remained highly popular throughout his presidency, consistently maintaining a 60% approval rating, making him one of the most popular leaders globally.

=== Political violence ===
Political violence in Mexico typically escalates during election season, with candidates often facing threats, abductions, assaults, or assassinations. While this violence is most common at the municipal level, it can also occur at the federal level.

During the 2021 elections, 102 politicians were killed, including 36 who were nominees or candidates for public office.

By January 2024, before the campaigning period started, multiple aspiring candidates for political office had been killed. The government provided security guards to around 560 candidates and election officials. Around 27,000 Armed Forces and National Guard personnel were deployed to secure the electoral process. By May 2024, the candidate death toll had risen to 37.

== Electoral system ==
=== Presidency ===
The president is elected by plurality voting in a single round; there is no provision for a second run-off round. Article 83 of the Mexican Constitution limits the president to a single six-year term, called a sexenio; no one who has served as president, even on a caretaker basis, may run for or serve in the office again. The winner takes office on 1 October.

=== Congress ===
The 500 members of the Chamber of Deputies serve three-year terms and are elected under a mixed system. Three hundred are chosen by plurality in single-member districts, and the remaining 200 by proportional representation from regional party lists in five electoral regions of 40 seats each, with seats divided according to Hamilton's method. The lists must observe gender parity and are headed alternately by women and men from one election to the next. Those elected in 2024 form the LXVI Legislature.

Only parties that win at least 3% of the valid national vote take part in the allocation of proportional seats. Two limits restrict the result: no party may hold more than 300 seats under both principles combined, and no party's share of the chamber may exceed its share of the national vote by more than eight percentage points. A party that would breach either limit loses proportional seats until it complies, and the surplus seats pass to the other parties. Coalition partners appear on the ballot under their own emblems and votes are counted for each party separately; since 2008 the electoral authority has applied the limits to each party rather than to a coalition as a whole. The INE allocates the proportional seats once the Electoral Tribunal of the Federal Judiciary (TEPJF) has ruled on all challenges to the district results, and no later than 23 August.

The 128 members of the Senate serve six-year terms. Ninety-six are elected in 32 three-seat constituencies based on the country's states, and the remaining 32 in a single nationwide constituency by proportional representation. In the three-seat constituencies, two seats are allocated to the party or coalition receiving the most votes (mayoría relativa) and one seat to the party or coalition receiving the second-highest votes (primera minoría).

Under a 2014 constitutional reform, deputies may serve up to four consecutive terms and senators up to two. The 2024 election was the first at which sitting senators could seek a consecutive term.

=== Voters and administration ===
The National Electoral Institute (INE) oversees federal elections in Mexico. Its responsibilities include organizing election day logistics, producing and distributing electoral materials, counting votes, and certifying the election results.

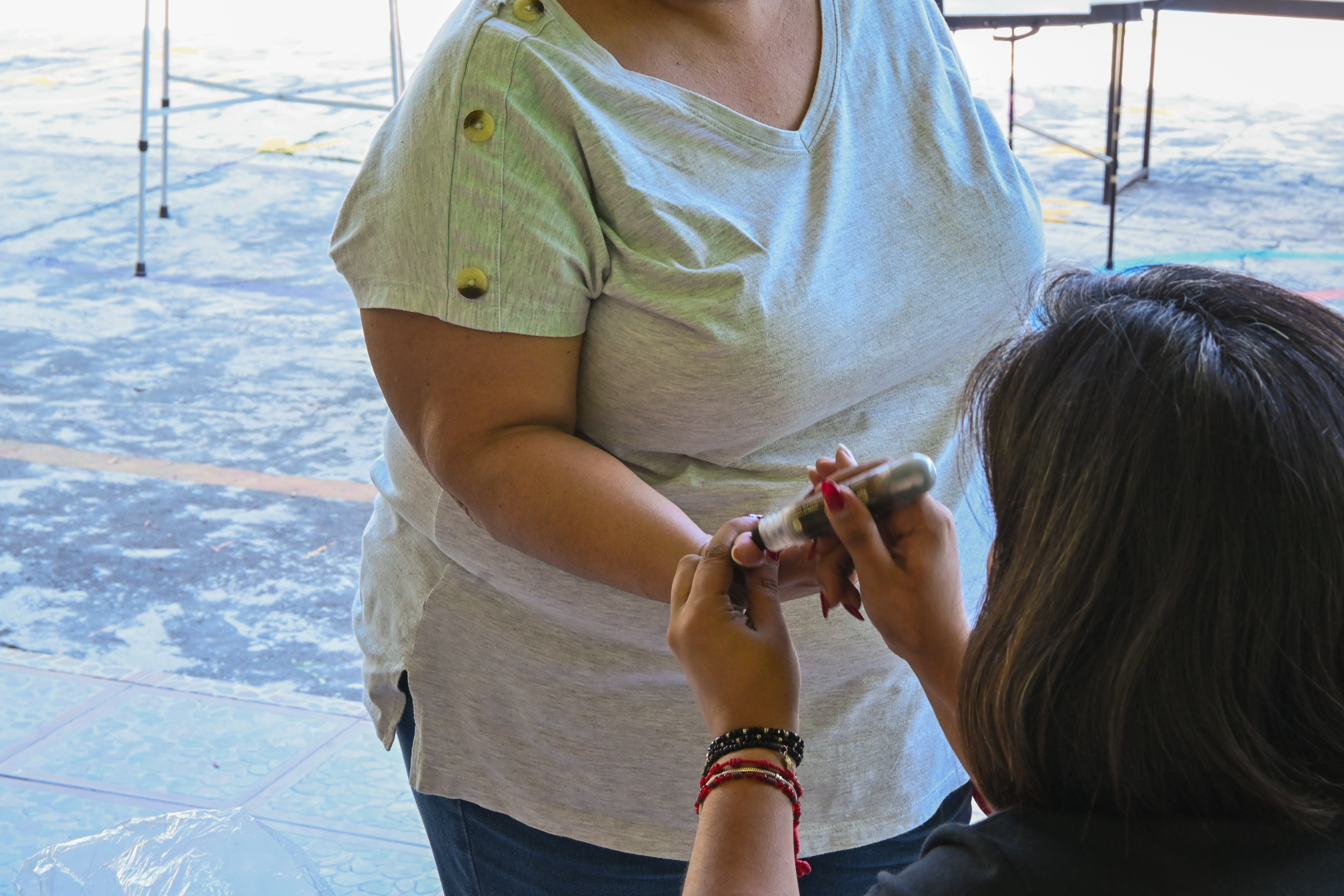
A person receives electoral ink on her thumb after casting her vote.

Voters must present their voter ID at polling stations to cast their ballots. Voters with physical limitations or disabilities and voters in preventive detention can vote in advance, with electoral materials sent to the voter. Mexican citizens residing abroad who maintain their political rights can vote by registering in the Electoral Roll for Citizens Residing Abroad and casting their votes at an embassy, electronically, or by mail. On 30 April 2024, the INE announced that there were 98,329,591 registered voters in Mexico, 187,388 registered voters abroad, 30,391 registered voters in preventive detention, and 4,002 registered for early voting. It approved 170,182 polling stations nationwide.

On election night, the INE publishes two sets of figures, both for information only. The Preliminary Electoral Results Program (PREP) progressively counts votes from polling-station tally sheets as they are delivered to the INE's district offices and publishes them online, while the quick count estimates turnout and each candidate's share from a random sample of polling stations. The official result comes from the district tally, in which tally sheets are recorded at the 300 district offices under the oversight of citizen councils and party representatives; electoral packages may be reopened for a recount, and a certificate of majority is then issued to the winner. The validation of the presidential result and the declaration of the president-elect are the exclusive responsibility of the TEPJF.

=== Redistricting ===
In December 2022, the INE redistributed the country's 300 electoral districts, making this the first election with the new boundaries. Minor adjustments were also made to the five multi-member constituencies, affecting the states of Hidalgo and Querétaro.

==== Newly created seats ====
Seven new districts were created.

1. Baja California's 9th
2. Coahuila's 8th
3. Nuevo León's 13th
4. Nuevo León's 14th
5. Puebla's 16th
6. Querétaro's 6th
7. Yucatán's 6th

==== Seats eliminated ====
Seven districts were eliminated.

1. Mexico City's 23rd
2. Mexico City's 24th
3. Guerrero's 9th
4. State of Mexico's 41st
5. Michoacán's 12th
6. Tamaulipas's 9th
7. Veracruz's 20th

== Political parties and coalitions ==
Seven national political parties were registered with the INE and were eligible to participate in the federal elections: the National Action Party (PAN), the Institutional Revolutionary Party (PRI), the Party of the Democratic Revolution (PRD), the Labor Party (PT), the Ecologist Green Party of Mexico (PVEM), Citizens' Movement (MC) and the National Regeneration Movement (Morena).

The General Law of Political Parties stipulates that national political parties can form coalitions for elections by submitting a coalition agreement to the electoral authority. Parties cannot join coalitions in their first election. All parties were eligible to join an alliance in this election.

Parties failing to reach 3% of the popular vote in the presidential or legislative elections will lose their registration as a national political party.

=== Summary ===
Party or alliance		Leader	Position	Status
Sigamos Haciendo Historia	National Regeneration Movement	Mario Delgado	Centre-left to left-wing	Government
Sigamos Haciendo Historia	Ecologist Green Party of Mexico	Karen Castrejón Trujillo	Centre-left	Government
Sigamos Haciendo Historia	Labor Party	Alberto Anaya	Left-wing to far-left	Government
Fuerza y Corazón por México	National Action Party	Marko Cortés Mendoza	Centre-right to right-wing	Opposition
Fuerza y Corazón por México	Institutional Revolutionary Party	Alejandro Moreno Cárdenas	Centre to centre-right or big tent	Opposition
Fuerza y Corazón por México	Party of the Democratic Revolution	Jesús Zambrano Grijalva	Centre-left	Opposition
Citizens' Movement		Dante Delgado Rannauro	Centre to centre-left	Opposition

=== Sigamos Haciendo Historia ===
Sigamos Haciendo Historia ("Let's Keep Making History") was established on 19 November 2023 as the direct successor to Juntos Hacemos Historia, encompassing the National Regeneration Movement (Morena), the Labor Party (PT), and the Ecologist Green Party of Mexico (PVEM).

=== Fuerza y Corazón por México ===
On 26 June 2023, the leaders of the constituent parties of Va por México, a big tent opposition coalition, announced the formation of Frente Amplio por México ("Broad Front for Mexico"). Comprising the National Action Party (PAN), the Institutional Revolutionary Party (PRI), and the Party of the Democratic Revolution (PRD), the grouping was created to select a presidential nominee.

On 29 August 2023, Dante Delgado, the party leader of Citizens' Movement, ruled out joining Frente Amplio por México.

On 20 November 2023, the grouping registered as a coalition under the name Fuerza y Corazón por México ("Strength and Heart for Mexico"), composed of the same parties.

== Presidential candidates ==
=== Sigamos Haciendo Historia ===
On 11 June 2023, Juntos Hacemos Historia, the predecessor coalition to Sigamos Haciendo Historia, announced an internal selection process to select a presumptive presidential nominee. To prevent the misuse of power, the alliance required prospective candidates to resign from their government positions before standing for nomination. The selection process was based on five opinion polls, with four conducted by polling firms suggested by the candidates and one conducted by the coalition. The polls were conducted from 28 August to 4 September.

Marcelo Ebrard, secretary of foreign affairs, was the first to register as a candidate, followed by Claudia Sheinbaum, Head of Government of Mexico City. Other candidates included Adán Augusto López, Gerardo Fernández Noroña, Ricardo Monreal, and Manuel Velasco. On 6 September 2023, Sheinbaum was declared the winner and was later confirmed as the presumptive nominee.

On 19 November 2023, the day Sigamos Haciendo Historia was officially registered as a coalition, it designated Sheinbaum as its presidential nominee. Sheinbaum formally registered her candidacy at the INE on 18 February 2024.

Candidate	%
Claudia Sheinbaum	39.38
Marcelo Ebrard	25.80
Gerardo Fernández Noroña	12.2
Adán Augusto López	10.0
Manuel Velasco Coello	7.16
Ricardo Monreal	5.86

Nominee

- Claudia Sheinbaum, Head of Government of Mexico City (2018–2023) and Mayor of Tlalpan (2015–2017)

=== Fuerza y Corazón por México ===
Frente Amplio por México required prospective candidates to gather 150,000 signatures, including at least 1,000 signatures from 17 of the country's 32 states. The selection process then included a series of polls to narrow the field, with the first one, conducted from 11 to 14 August, aimed to identify the top three candidates. A second poll was scheduled for 27–30 August, contributing 50% of the points needed for nomination, with the remaining 50% determined through an online survey on 3 September.

Thirty-three individuals registered for the race, but only thirteen were approved by the grouping. Of those, four candidates successfully gathered the required signatures: Xóchitl Gálvez, Beatriz Paredes, Santiago Creel, and Enrique de la Madrid. During the first poll, Enrique de la Madrid was eliminated. On 21 August, just before the second poll, Santiago Creel withdrew and endorsed Xóchitl Gálvez. In the second poll, Gálvez defeated Paredes by 15 points. On 31 August, the PRI officially endorsed Gálvez, effectively withdrawing its support for Paredes. Later that day, the third poll was canceled, and Gálvez was confirmed as the presumptive presidential nominee.

On 20 November 2023, the day Frente Amplio por México registered as a coalition under the name Fuerza y Corazón por México, it designated Gálvez as the coalition's presidential nominee. She formally registered her candidacy at the INE on 20 February 2024.

Candidate	First poll	Second poll
Candidate	%	%
Xóchitl Gálvez	38.3	57.58
Beatriz Paredes	26.0	42.42
Santiago Creel	20.1	Withdrawn
Enrique de la Madrid	15.6	Eliminated

Nominee

- Xóchitl Gálvez, Senator (2018–2023) and Mayor of Miguel Hidalgo (2015–2018).

=== Citizens' Movement ===
Citizens' Movement's presidential candidate registration period was open from 3 to 12 November. The first person to register was Senator Indira Kempis Martínez, who had previously declared her intention to run for president. Seven others, including Samuel García, governor of Nuevo León, registered in the race. On 12 November, Marcelo Ebrard, who had failed to be selected as the candidate for Sigamos Haciendo Historia, announced he was not seeking the party's nomination despite being courted by the party.

On 17 November, the party disqualified seven out of eight candidates, leaving only Samuel García. However, on 2 December, García suspended his campaign due to a political crisis in his state over appointing an interim governor to replace him. On 9 January 2024, federal deputy Jorge Máynez was nominated as a substitute for Samuel García, with García announcing on social media that Máynez would be the party's next presidential candidate. Máynez was officially designated as the party's presidential nominee the next day. Máynez formally registered his candidacy at the INE on 22 February 2024.

Nominee

- Jorge Máynez, federal deputy (2021–2024, 2015–2018) and deputy of the Congress of Zacatecas (2010–2013).

=== Independents ===
The registration deadline for individuals wishing to run for president as independent candidates (i.e., without the backing of a registered party) expired on 7 September 2023.

To formalize their candidacies, independent presidential hopefuls must collect the signatures of voters endorsing them in an amount equal to 1% of the country's entire electoral roll – a total of 961,405 – distributed equally across at least 17 of the nation's states within 120 days.

A total of 27 individuals informed the INE of their wish to run for the presidency as independent candidates before the deadline. By 7 September, six of them had been permitted to begin collecting signatures; the remaining 21 were given 48 hours to correct shortcomings in the documentation they had presented. The six green-lighted prospective independent candidates were Rocío Gabriela González Castañeda, Ulises Ernesto Ruiz Ortiz, César Enrique Asiain del Castillo, Hugo Eric Flores Cervantes, María Ofelia Edgar Mares, and José Eduardo Verástegui Córdoba. A further three – Fernando Mauricio Jiménez Chávez, Manuel Antonio Romo Aguirre, and Ignacio Benavente Torres – were announced on 27 September.

After the 120-day deadline, the INE announced that no prospective independent candidates had successfully collected the required signatures.

== Campaigns ==
The INE established that the campaigning period for president, senators, and federal deputies would officially begin on 1 March and conclude on 29 May, three days before the elections. Election silence was observed from 30 May until the polls closed on 2 June.

=== Campaign finance ===
Under the INE's financing plan for 2024, the national parties were to receive MXN 10.4 billion in public funding, of which MXN 3.3 billion was earmarked for campaigning; Morena's share, MXN 3.2 billion, was about 30% of the total. The INE capped spending at MXN 660.9 million for each presidential campaign, up from MXN 429.6 million in 2018, and at about MXN 2.2 million for each Chamber of Deputies race; caps for Senate races varied by state, from MXN 4.4 million to MXN 44.1 million. Parties could not buy broadcast advertising; instead the INE allocated about 30.5 million radio and television spots to them across the precampaign and campaign periods, 30% divided equally and 70% according to each party's vote in the previous Chamber of Deputies election.

=== Presidential campaign ===
==== Launch and opening weeks ====
The three candidates opened their campaigns on 1 March. Gálvez began shortly after midnight in Fresnillo, Zacatecas, where she walked with families of victims of violence, and later that day in Irapuato signed a pledge in her own blood not to abolish the government's social programs. Sheinbaum spoke before thousands of supporters in Mexico City's Zócalo, and Máynez opened his campaign that night before a small crowd in Lagos de Moreno, Jalisco. Sheinbaum entered the race more than 20 percentage points ahead of Gálvez, with Máynez a distant third at about 5%.

Sheinbaum opening her campaign in Mexico City’s Zócalo on 1 March 2024

Sheinbaum ran on continuity. At the Zócalo, she presented a 100-point program that kept López Obrador's social programs and flagship projects, and asked voters to help build the "second floor of the transformation". Analysts described her offer as "total continuity", designed to avoid any distance from a president whose supporters she relied on. Her team was coordinated by Morena's president, Mario Delgado, and included three of her rivals for the nomination, Adán Augusto López, Ricardo Monreal and Gerardo Fernández Noroña; Delgado set the party the task of placing representatives at every polling station. She campaigned mainly through rallies: in the first month she visited 21 states and held 60 rallies, covering 72 of the 300 electoral districts, about half of them in states governed by the opposition; the opposition criticized her for skipping private-sector forums. Gálvez visited 19 states in the same period, mostly at indoor events.

Gálvez spent her first weeks campaigning mainly on security. Three weeks into the campaign she reorganized her team, appointing Max Cortázar deputy coordinator in charge of messaging and advertising and reducing the role of her coordinator, Santiago Creel, who remained her link to the parties and was negotiating with them for more money and broadcast time.

Máynez built his campaign around voters aged 18 to 29, who made up 27% of the electorate, visiting a university a day in its first weeks. His jingle "Presidente Máynez" spread widely on social media, where young users posted dance routines to it; by April he had 1.7 million followers on TikTok, against Gálvez's 503,000.

==== Mid-campaign ====
López Obrador's daily press conferences became a recurring point of dispute. In late March, the INE's complaints commission ordered the removal or editing of content from five of them, while declining to suspend the conferences; councillor Claudia Zavala said that it was the constitution, not the INE, that imposed a duty of neutrality on public servants. The commission ordered four further conferences modified in April, and in early May, the removal of one in which López Obrador had accused the INE of foul play in organizing the debates.

Ahead of the second of the three presidential debates, in late April, Sheinbaum, who had visited 29 of the 32 states, said that "a debate can hardly change that difference", and set out to defend her lead and López Obrador's record. Gálvez had by then shifted her message from security to reassuring voters that "the social programs stay and Morena goes", after meeting the leaders of the PAN, PRI and PRD; at a closed-door meeting in mid-April, she and the party leaders agreed to unify the coalition's message around her. The political scientist Patricio Morales judged that she had not managed to communicate her project.

With Gálvez trailing, her allies urged Máynez to withdraw and his supporters to cast a tactical vote for her. After the second debate, PRI president Alejandro Moreno and PAN president Marko Cortés asked him to step aside, and the businessman Claudio X. González joined the call days later. Moreno offered Máynez the leadership of the Mexican Youth Institute (IMJUVE) and called him a "scab" working for Sheinbaum. On 14 May, he went further, proposing to resign the party leadership and give up his Senate candidacy if Máynez withdrew before the final debate. Cortés, accepting that Máynez would stay in the race, urged voters to back the candidate able to defeat "a populist and destructive government". Gálvez declined to seek a deal with Máynez but said she would court his voters directly.

Máynez refused each time. He answered that the opposition parties should withdraw in his favor instead and dismissed Moreno's offer as a sign of desperation; MC leader Dante Delgado called the claim that his party split the opposition vote a fallacy of the "old politics". Máynez also released a new version of his jingle urging supporters to vote for him. Sheinbaum, who had said that Máynez had "every right to take part", mocked her opponents for "fighting over who resigns".

==== Final weeks ====
On 22 May, a stage collapsed in high winds at a Máynez rally in San Pedro Garza García, Nuevo León, killing at least nine people and injuring more than 120. Máynez suspended his campaign events, and Sheinbaum cancelled a rally in nearby Monterrey the next day.

Polls differed on how far Gálvez had closed the gap. El Financiero's series showed her moving from 17 points behind Sheinbaum at the start of the campaign to 10 points behind at its end, while the Associated Press reported that her popularity had been declining. Sheinbaum told supporters in mid-May not to be complacent despite her lead, saying that Morena and its allies now had representatives covering every polling station.

Aerial view of the Zócalo during Sheinbaum’s closing rally on 29 May 2024

The candidates closed their campaigns on 29 May. Sheinbaum returned to the Zócalo, saying she had visited more than 170 municipalities and held more than 160 rallies; she stepped back from her confrontations with Gálvez, offering "peace and harmony" to all Mexicans and pledging to safeguard López Obrador's legacy. Gálvez held her main closing rally at the Arena Monterrey and a final event in her hometown of Tepatepec, Hidalgo, and Máynez closed with a music festival at the Auditorio BlackBerry in Mexico City.

=== Legislative campaign ===
Candidate selection drew criticism in both blocs. Morena chose its district candidates through surveys, which missed their January deadline, and one of its senators, José Ramón Enríquez, accused party president Mario Delgado of assigning candidacies through "political agreements" without surveys; in February, the party filled most places on its proportional-representation lists by lottery. The leaders of the PAN, PRI and PRD – Marko Cortés, Alejandro Moreno, and Jesús Zambrano – each placed themselves first on their party's Senate proportional representation list, which former president Felipe Calderón called "vulgar ambition" and a burden for Gálvez.

Morena and its allies campaigned for a two-thirds majority in both chambers, enough to amend the constitution without opposition votes: 334 of 500 seats in the Chamber of Deputies and 86 of 128 in the Senate. Analysts saw the congressional contest as the decisive one for the next government. The goal was to pass the package of constitutional reforms known as "Plan C". At a rally in San Luis Potosí on 6 March, Sheinbaum asked voters to back the coalition's parties in every race so that "all judges are elected by the people of Mexico". The opposition presented the contest as a defense of democratic institutions, and Sheinbaum used her closing speech to reject the framing that the election was a choice between "democracy or authoritarianism".

=== Campaign issues ===
==== Security ====
In El Financiero's polling, public security remained the most urgent problem a month into the campaign. Intentional homicides under López Obrador had peaked at 36,773 in 2020 and fell to 29,675 in 2023, still above any year between 1990 and 2017. His government had pursued a strategy summed up by the slogan "hugs, not bullets" and created the National Guard.

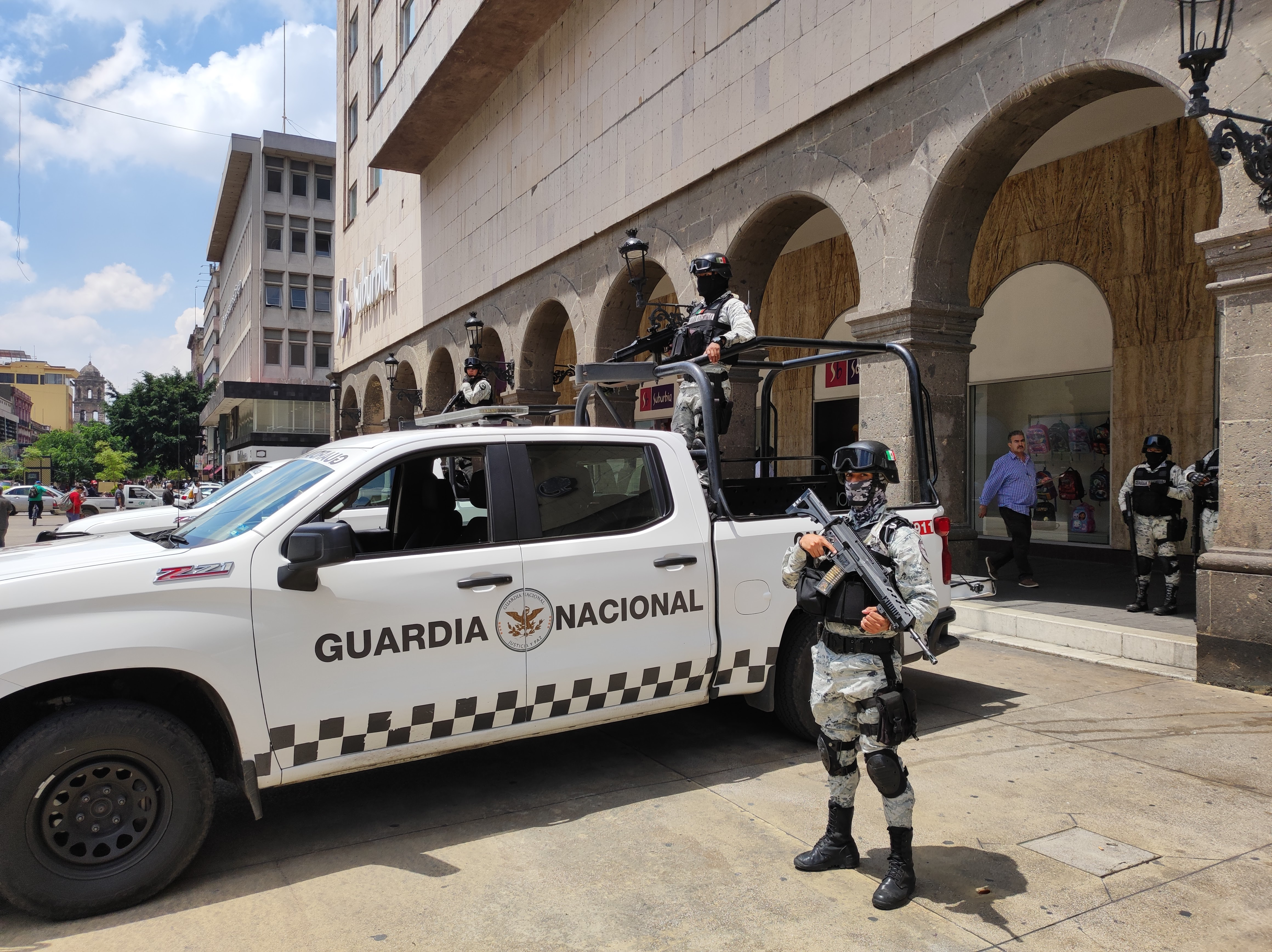
National Guard officers in 2023; the force’s future was a central issue of the campaign

Gálvez made the issue the center of her challenge. At a rally in Irapuato on the first day of the campaign, she declared that "hugs for criminals are over" and promised a much more aggressive approach, including doubling the National Guard to 300,000 members under civilian command. She also proposed higher pay for state police, a national police university, more prosecutors and judges, a new maximum-security prison, and closer cooperation with the United States against the cartels. For Sheinbaum, Foreign Policy noted, openly criticizing López Obrador's record was risky because she relied on his supporters. She offered continuity with a technical emphasis drawn from her time as Head of Government of Mexico City, where homicides had fallen to their lowest level since 1989: "zero impunity" through better intelligence and closer coordination between the National Guard, state police and prosecutors.

The issue was also fought through accusations of links to organized crime. A January 2024 report by ProPublica alleging that traffickers had funded López Obrador's 2006 campaign set off the hashtag #NarcoPresidente and variants aimed at Sheinbaum, which the government attributed to bot accounts. After Gálvez called Sheinbaum a "narco-candidate" in the second debate, the INE's complaints commission ordered the remarks removed as potentially defamatory; Gálvez repeated the term at a rally days later, and such accusations dominated the final debate, where Sheinbaum answered that the drug war launched by Calderón had meant "permission to kill". On 24 May, the INE also barred Gálvez from calling Morena a "narco-party".

Commentators noted that López Obrador remained popular although his security policy had failed to curb killings.

==== Social programs ====
López Obrador's government had expanded cash transfers, the largest being the Pension for the Well-being of Older People (Pensión para el Bienestar de las Personas Adultas Mayores) for everyone aged 65 and over, and the programs divided the electorate. In El Financiero's March poll, 53% of respondents lived in households that received one; Sheinbaum led Gálvez by 64% to 21% among them, while Gálvez led by 47% to 36% among everyone else.

On her first day of campaigning, Gálvez signed a pledge in her own blood that no program would be abolished, and promised to lower the pension age to 60. She argued that fear of losing the programs was what favored Morena, and accused the government's door-to-door program staff of telling beneficiaries that a vote for another party would cost them their benefits; in Mexico City she campaigned under the slogan "Morena goes, the social programs stay". Sheinbaum replied that the programs were "rights of the people of Mexico", not handouts, that only her movement could guarantee them, and that the PAN had voted against the universal pension. She pledged that payments would always rise faster than inflation and proposed two new programs, scholarships for all pupils in basic education, and a payment for women aged 60 to 64. Máynez also promised to keep the programs, focusing instead on better-paid work, including a cut in the legal working week from 48 to 40 hours, which Sheinbaum said she would study and Gálvez said was premature.

==== Health ====
A 2020 protest over shortages of HIV medicines

The three campaigns agreed that the priorities were ending medicine shortages and widening coverage, but differed on the remedy. Sheinbaum defended the government's centralized model, in which IMSS-Bienestar serves people without social security and the state-owned Birmex buys medicines in bulk, adding contracts with private pharmacies to dispense free generics. Gálvez campaigned on the shortages, promising to restore medicine distribution within four months and to revive the Seguro Popular, with a "Mi Salud" card allowing treatment in public or private hospitals. Máynez proposed a universal system regardless of employment status.

==== Plan C and democratic institutions ====
López Obrador coined "Plan C" in 2023, when the Supreme Court appeared set to strike down his "Plan B" electoral reform: if the courts blocked his changes, voters should give his movement the 334 deputies needed to amend the constitution. On 5 February 2024, he sent Congress twenty constitutional reforms, including the popular election of judges and electoral authorities, a smaller INE, and the abolition of all seats allocated by proportional representation, which would cut the Chamber of Deputies from 500 to 300 seats and the Senate from 128 to 64. As early as October 2023, Sheinbaum urged Morena’s supporters to win the two-thirds majorities that Plan C required. During the campaign she backed the popular election of judges, Supreme Court justices and INE councillors, the abolition of proportional-representation seats, and a constitutional ban on re-election.

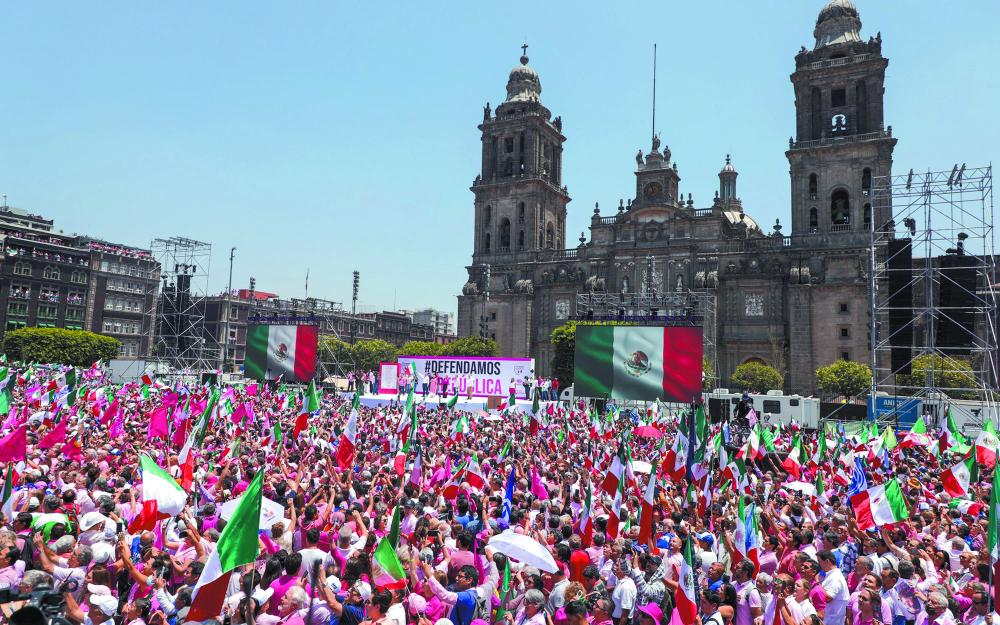
A Marea Rosa march in 2023

The opposition made the defence of democratic institutions its central theme. The constituent parties of Fuerza y Corazón por México had blocked earlier attempts at electoral reform, and a civic movement known as the Marea Rosa (“Pink Tide”) had formed in late 2022 to defend the INE from López Obrador’s proposed reforms. On 18 February 2024, its “march for democracy” filled Mexico City’s Zócalo, with the government estimating 90,000 attendees and organizers about 700,000. At the final debate, Gálvez warned that democracy was at risk and that Supreme Court justices should not be chosen by “quotas or cronies”; Máynez agreed the judiciary needed reform, but not one that undermined its autonomy or concentrated power.

The message reached a limited audience. Shortly before the vote, 15% of respondents told El Financiero they identified with the Marea Rosa movement, against 49% who did not; Gálvez led by two to one among the first group and Sheinbaum by almost three to one among the second. The historian Humberto Beck judged the opposition's criticisms "in one sense correct", but said its own democratic credentials were far from impeccable.

==== Energy ====
The two leading candidates backed a transition to cleaner energy but by different routes: Sheinbaum proposed continuing López Obrador's "energy sovereignty" policy of strengthening Pemex and the CFE, while investing US$13.6 billion in renewables by 2030 and allowing more private participation than her predecessor. Gálvez proposed reviving the market opening of the 2013 energy reform, including renewable-energy auctions and oil tenders, and opening Pemex to private investment on the model of Brazil's Petrobras. Máynez proposed a national clean-energy model to "move this country with the energy of the sun and the wind".

=== Debates ===
Before the campaigning period, the INE set the date and venue for the three presidential debates. According to electoral law, presidential candidates are required to take part in a minimum of two debates. The INE chose the moderators about a month before each debate. All debates were held in Mexico City.

Debates for the 2024 Mexican presidential election
Date	Time	Venue	Moderator(s)	Participants	Viewership (millions)
7 April 2024	8:00 p.m. CST	Instituto Nacional Electoral	Denise Maerker; Manuel López San Martín	Claudia Sheinbaum; Xóchitl Gálvez; Jorge Máynez	13.7
28 April 2024	8:00 p.m. CST	Estudios Churubusco	Adriana Pérez Cañedo; Alejandro Cacho	Claudia Sheinbaum; Xóchitl Gálvez; Jorge Máynez	16.18
19 May 2024	8:00 p.m. CST	Centro Cultural Universitario Tlatelolco (UNAM)	Luisa Cantú Ríos; Elena Solís; Javier Solórzano Zinser	Claudia Sheinbaum; Xóchitl Gálvez; Jorge Máynez	13.9

The first debate was held on 7 April 2024 at the INE's headquarters. The theme was "the society we want", with questions on health, education, corruption, discrimination and violence against women. The Associated Press described it as light on proposals and heavy on personal attacks. According to El País, Gálvez attacked Sheinbaum at every opportunity, raising the collapse of the Colegio Rébsamen in the 2017 earthquake, the Mexico City Metro overpass collapse and the COVID-19 pandemic in Mexico City, and calling her the "ice lady"; Máynez accused both of belonging to the "old politics".

The fact-checkers of the news site Animal Político found false statements from all three candidates. Sheinbaum said that femicides had fallen by more than 40% nationally, when official figures showed a fall of 7.5% between 2018 and 2023. Gálvez said that 70% of children did not understand what they read, when the OECD's PISA tests put the share at 53%, and Máynez gave false figures on medicine vouchers under the Peña Nieto administration. Commentators saw no clear winner. López Obrador complained that "the whole narrative of the debate was not to recognize anything" done under his administration.

Election specialists faulted the INE's organization of the first debate: the on-screen clock malfunctioned, candidates had about a minute and a half to answer on subjects such as health, and the analyst Georgina de la Fuente judged that the INE had been the debate's loser. Gálvez called the event a "disaster" and said the format differed from the one the campaigns had agreed, which had included a segment for direct exchanges between the candidates. On 11 April, INE president Guadalupe Taddei accepted the criticism and said the institute would act on it for the next debate. Five days later, representatives of the three campaigns met the INE's debates commission and asked for written agreements and for the moderators to keep to the agreed questions.

The second debate, on 28 April 2024 at Estudios Churubusco, addressed "the route to the development of Mexico", covering the economy, infrastructure, poverty and climate change, with questions gathered from citizens in all 32 states. According to the INE, it was the most watched debate in Mexican history. Gálvez pressed Sheinbaum on alleged corruption in López Obrador's administration, including allegations against one of the president's sons and accusations of illicit enrichment against Rocío Nahle García; Sheinbaum challenged her to file a complaint. The two traded insults, Sheinbaum calling Gálvez "the corrupt one" and Gálvez calling Sheinbaum the "narco-candidate". Sheinbaum and Gálvez both pledged to keep López Obrador's social programs. Animal Político again found errors from all three candidates. Sheinbaum's statement that "there is no inflation" was false, and other figures she used to defend the government's record were false or misleading. Gálvez’s statements that the country was suffering the worst drought in its history and that she had won her government contracts under Morena through open tenders were both false. Máynez used more precise data than either rival, although some of his figures were inexact.

The third and final debate was held on 19 May 2024 at UNAM's Centro Cultural Universitario Tlatelolco. The theme was "democracy and government: constructive dialogues", covering social policy, crime, migration, foreign policy and the division of powers. The INE had planned a segment in which the candidates would question each other directly, but on 9 May, the campaigns agreed instead to submit questions for the moderators to choose from and ask. Sheinbaum defended López Obrador's approach to the Mexican drug war, Gálvez pledged to strengthen the National Guard and the police, and Máynez concentrated on young people, promising a five-day work week and more university places. Defending mandatory pretrial detention, Sheinbaum said that abolishing it would free 60,000 criminals; Animal Político found that about 44,000 people were held under it, none of them convicted. Máynez's statement that Mexico had the ninth-largest number of poor people in the world was also false, and several of Gálvez's figures were misleading or debatable, though none of those checked was false. Commentators criticized the loss of the face-to-face segment, saying it hindered real exchange, and were divided on the winner.

Carin Zissis of the Americas Society/Council of the Americas wrote that many observers expected the debates to have little effect on the result unless a candidate performed disastrously.

== Opinion polls ==
=== Graphical summary ===
Local regression of polling conducted up to the 2024 Mexican presidential election (excludes others and undecided)

=== Polling aggregations ===
Source of poll aggregation	Dates administered	Dates updated				Lead
Source of poll aggregation	Dates administered	Dates updated	Sheinbaum SHH	Gálvez FCM	Máynez MC	Lead
Oraculus	through May 2024	29 May 2024	53%	36%	11%	17%
CEDE	through 28 May 2024	29 May 2024	56%	33.3%	10.7%	22.7%
Polls.mx	through 29 May 2024	29 May 2024	55%	31%	13%	24%
Bloomberg	through 28 May 2024	29 May 2024	55.3%	34%	10.7%	21.3%
Expansión Política	through 28 May 2024	29 May 2024	53.16%	33.76%	10.36%	19.4%
Average			54.5%	33.6%	11.2%	20.9%
Results			61.18%	28.11%	10.57%	33.08%

== Conduct ==
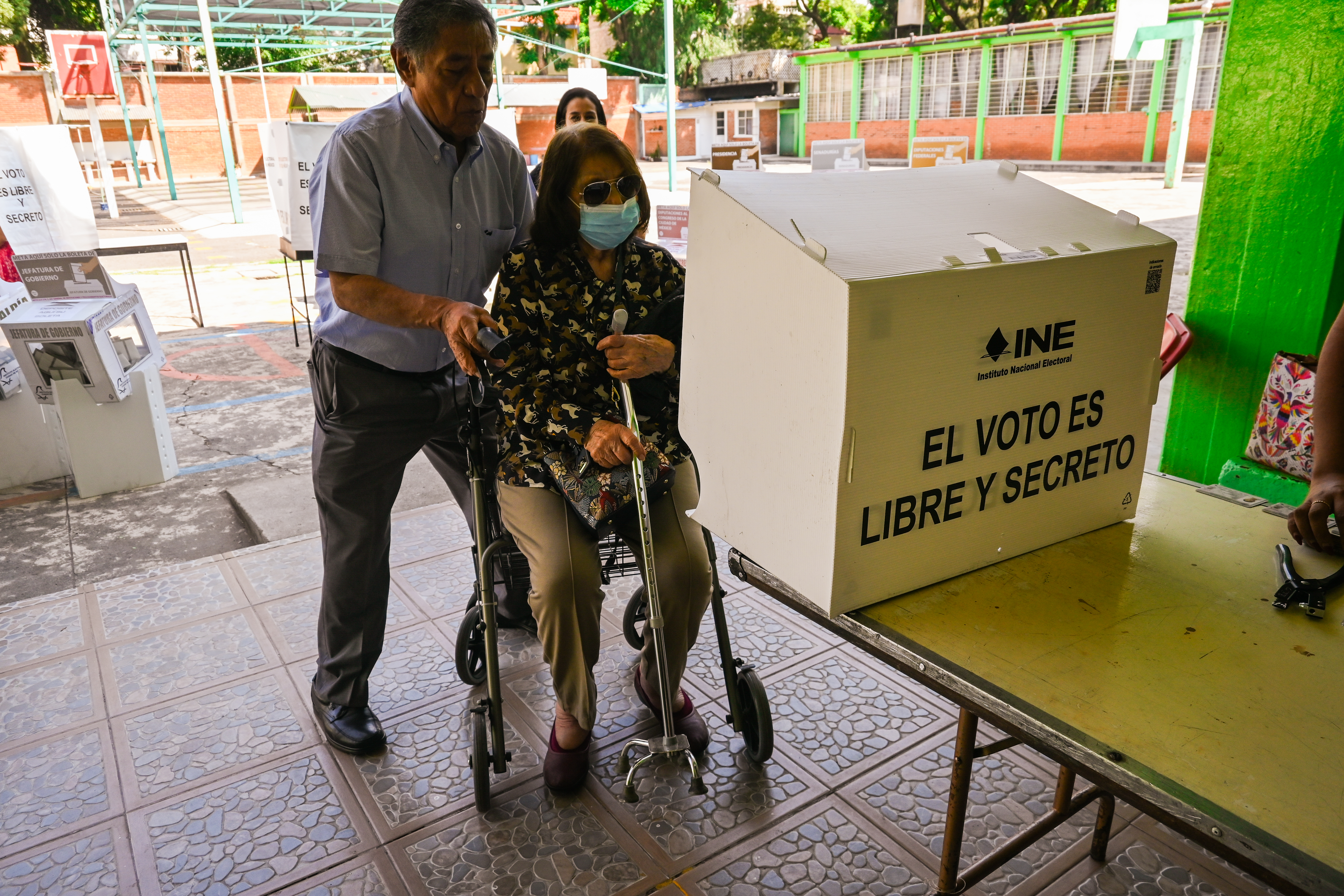
Voter in a wheelchair uses an adapted voting booth.

Early voting for voters with disabilities or limited physical mobility and those in preventive detention was held from 6 to 20 May. On 2 June, polling stations opened at 8:00 CST and closed at 18:00 CST. By 20:00 that evening, the INE reported that all but 23 of the approved polling stations had been installed.

=== Election day violence ===
On 1 June, authorities ordered the suspension of voting in the municipalities of Pantelhó and Chicomuselo in Chiapas, citing the burning of election papers in the former by unknown individuals on 31 May and threats against poll workers by gang members. On election day, two people were killed in shootings at polling stations at Coyomeapan and Tlanalapan in Puebla.

== Results ==
About 60 million votes were cast in each election, with most of them being cast on election day. The election saw a lower turnout than the 2012 and 2018 presidential elections, at 61.05%. Claudia Sheinbaum received 35.9 million votes, surpassing López Obrador's 2018 record of 30.1 million and making her the candidate with the most votes in Mexican history. She also achieved the highest vote percentage of any candidate since 1982.

Sheinbaum carried 31 out of 32 states, with Aguascalientes being the only state where a plurality voted for Xóchitl Gálvez. Sheinbaum managed to flip Guanajuato – the home state of former president Vicente Fox – and a state considered a bastion for the National Action Party since 2000; it was the only state not voting for López Obrador in 2018.

Besides Aguascalientes, Gálvez placed second in all states except Campeche, where Jorge Máynez defeated her by five and a half points. She also obtained 5.4 million fewer votes than the combined total of both Ricardo Anaya and José Antonio Meade, the PAN and PRI nominees for president in 2018, respectively; Gálvez obtained 16.5 million in total, while Anaya and Meade obtained 21.9 million votes combined.

Máynez's performance in the election marked the best result for Citizens' Movement in its history. The party received 5.2 million more votes compared to 2018 when it received about 1 million – about a 500% increase. Citizens' Movement secured the third-highest votes among all parties in the election, behind Morena and the PAN.

=== President ===
Candidate	Party or alliance		Votes	%
Claudia Sheinbaum	Sigamos Haciendo Historia	National Regeneration Movement	27,364,649	46.61
Claudia Sheinbaum	Sigamos Haciendo Historia	Ecologist Green Party of Mexico	4,677,057	7.97
Claudia Sheinbaum	Sigamos Haciendo Historia	Labor Party	3,882,813	6.61
Claudia Sheinbaum	Sigamos Haciendo Historia	Total	35,924,519	61.18
Xóchitl Gálvez	Fuerza y Corazón por México	National Action Party	9,644,918	16.43
Xóchitl Gálvez	Fuerza y Corazón por México	Institutional Revolutionary Party	5,736,759	9.77
Xóchitl Gálvez	Fuerza y Corazón por México	Party of the Democratic Revolution	1,121,020	1.91
Xóchitl Gálvez	Fuerza y Corazón por México	Total	16,502,697	28.11
Jorge Máynez	Citizens' Movement		6,204,710	10.57
Non-registered candidates			83,114	0.14
Total			58,715,040	100.00
Valid votes			58,715,040	97.67
Invalid/blank votes			1,400,144	2.33
Total votes			60,115,184	100.00
Registered voters/turnout			98,468,994	61.05
Source: INE, (Street Level Result)

==== By state ====
State	Sheinbaum SHH		Gálvez FCM		Máynez MC		Write-ins		Invalid/blank votes		Total Votes
State	Votes	%	Votes	%	Votes	%	Votes	%	Votes	%	Total Votes
Aguascalientes	284,706	42.73	306,262	45.97	59,498	8.93	1,571	0.24	14,205	2.13	666,242
Baja California	1,039,973	66.65	330,657	21.19	155,262	9.95	2,929	0.19	31,512	2.02	1,560,333
Baja California Sur	201,126	59.14	101,136	29.74	29,825	8.77	463	0.14	7,539	2.22	340,089
Campeche	275,315	61.30	69,546	15.48	94,280	20.99	432	0.10	9,570	2.13	449,143
Coahuila	853,437	53.72	617,208	38.85	85,857	5.40	1,203	0.08	31,004	1.95	1,588,709
Colima	188,093	54.41	103,580	29.96	46,092	13.33	698	0.20	7,247	2.10	345,710
Chiapas	1,769,444	71.55	412,846	16.69	183,101	7.40	2,269	0.09	105,298	4.26	2,472,958
Chihuahua	885,869	53.86	559,690	34.03	157,077	9.55	2,280	0.14	39,737	2.42	1,644,653
Mexico City	3,095,413	55.20	1,937,152	34.55	467,960	8.35	9,723	0.17	97,303	1.74	5,607,551
Durango	455,237	58.45	250,283	32.13	56,129	7.21	698	0.09	16,563	2.13	778,910
Guanajuato	1,302,706	47.22	1,103,326	39.99	291,379	10.56	4,613	0.17	57,068	2.07	2,759,092
Guerrero	1,110,844	71.66	291,130	18.78	98,827	6.38	1,430	0.09	47,869	3.09	1,550,100
Hidalgo	1,043,873	67.44	307,056	19.84	159,899	10.33	1,586	0.10	35,547	2.30	1,547,961
Jalisco	1,720,921	44.44	1,384,825	35.76	670,462	17.31	8,648	0.22	87,479	2.26	3,872,339
México	5,125,040	60.60	2,241,267	26.50	905,529	10.71	10,882	0.13	174,459	2.06	8,457,177
Michoacán	1,140,630	55.07	607,301	29.32	250,391	12.09	3,808	0.18	69,044	3.33	2,071,174
Morelos	631,526	63.80	211,169	21.34	126,294	12.76	1,075	0.11	19,713	1.99	989,777
Nayarit	342,762	63.27	109,487	20.21	74,621	13.77	711	0.13	14,134	2.61	541,715
Nuevo León	1,159,159	45.21	888,064	34.64	463,002	18.06	3,398	0.13	50,253	1.96	2,563,876
Oaxaca	1,441,211	76.37	271,981	14.41	124,621	6.60	1,633	0.09	47,631	2.52	1,887,077
Puebla	2,146,741	65.19	716,148	21.74	332,071	10.08	4,102	0.12	93,890	2.85	3,292,952
Querétaro	622,335	51.08	449,501	36.89	116,117	9.53	2,957	0.24	27,548	2.26	1,218,458
Quintana Roo	605,361	73.17	138,992	16.80	63,890	7.72	1,339	0.16	17,703	2.14	827,285
San Luis Potosí	826,746	60.51	347,948	25.47	146,802	10.75	2,020	0.15	42,682	3.12	1,366,198
Sinaloa	872,249	65.59	326,368	24.54	103,193	7.76	1,128	0.08	26,868	2.02	1,329,806
Sonora	750,219	63.92	290,917	24.79	107,759	9.18	1,423	0.12	23,401	1.99	1,173,719
Tabasco	897,143	80.53	124,037	11.13	66,018	5.93	1,107	0.10	25,696	2.31	1,114,001
Tamaulipas	1,013,715	62.33	427,228	26.27	152,528	9.38	1,865	0.11	30,965	1.90	1,626,301
Tlaxcala	512,774	69.20	109,112	14.73	103,236	13.93	800	0.11	15,038	2.03	740,960
Veracruz	2,441,410	66.45	846,842	23.05	294,613	8.02	3,769	0.10	87,363	2.38	3,673,997
Yucatán	779,851	60.69	390,645	30.40	88,001	6.85	1,177	0.09	25,301	1.97	1,284,975
Zacatecas	388,690	50.35	230,993	29.92	130,376	16.89	1,373	0.18	20,514	2.66	771,946
Total	35,924,519	59.76	16,502,697	27.45	6,204,710	10.32	83,114	0.14	1,400,144	2.33	60,115,184

=== Legislature ===
==== Senate ====
Party or alliance		Constituency			Party-list			Total seats	+/–
Party or alliance		Votes	%	Seats	Votes	%	Seats	Total seats	+/–
Sigamos Haciendo Historia	National Regeneration Movement	7,526,453	13.19	21	24,484,943	42.48	14	60	+5
Sigamos Haciendo Historia	Ecologist Green Party of Mexico	2,298,726	4.03	4	5,357,959	9.30	3	14	+8
Sigamos Haciendo Historia	Labor Party	1,215,172	2.13	0	3,214,708	5.58	2	9	+3
Sigamos Haciendo Historia	Common candidates (Note: Of the elected candidates, 25 belong to the National Regeneration Movement, 7 to the Ecologist Green Party of Mexico, and 7 to the Labor Party.)	21,731,737	38.08	39				–	–
Sigamos Haciendo Historia	Total	32,772,088	57.43	64	33,057,610	57.36	19	83	+14
Fuerza y Corazón por México	National Action Party	1,148,920	2.01	1	10,107,537	17.54	6	22	–1
Fuerza y Corazón por México	Institutional Revolutionary Party	316,636	0.55	0	6,530,305	11.33	4	16	+2
Fuerza y Corazón por México	Party of the Democratic Revolution	76,082	0.13	0	1,363,012	2.36	0	2	–6
Fuerza y Corazón por México	Common candidates (Note: Of the elected candidates, 15 belong to the National Action Party, 12 to the Institutional Revolutionary Party, and 2 to the Party of the Democratic Revolution.)	16,244,373	28.47	29				–	–
Fuerza y Corazón por México	Total	17,786,011	31.17	30	18,000,854	31.23	10	40	+2
Citizens' Movement		6,460,220	11.32	2	6,528,238	11.33	3	5	–2
Non-registered candidates		46,230	0.08	0	47,092	0.08	0	0	0
Total		57,064,549	100.00	96	57,633,794	100.00	32	128	0
Valid votes		57,064,549	96.08		57,633,794	96.05			
Invalid/blank votes		2,326,742	3.92		2,369,932	3.95			
Total votes		59,391,291	100.00		60,003,726	100.00			
Source: INE (PR)

==== Chamber of Deputies ====
Party or alliance		Constituency			Party-list			Total seats	+/–
Party or alliance		Votes	%	Seats	Votes	%	Seats	Total seats	+/–
Sigamos Haciendo Historia	National Regeneration Movement	3,686,979	6.48	37	24,286,317	42.40	75	236	+38
Sigamos Haciendo Historia	Ecologist Green Party of Mexico	676,092	1.19	0	4,993,988	8.72	20	77	+34
Sigamos Haciendo Historia	Labor Party	507,604	0.89	0	3,254,718	5.68	13	51	+14
Sigamos Haciendo Historia	Common candidates (Note: Of the elected candidates, 124 belong to the National Regeneration Movement, 57 to the Ecologist Green Party of Mexico, and 38 to the Labor Party.)	27,446,014	48.26	219				–	–
Sigamos Haciendo Historia	Total	32,316,689	56.82	256	32,535,023	56.80	108	364	+86
Fuerza y Corazón por México	National Action Party	372,670	0.66	3	10,049,375	17.55	40	72	–42
Fuerza y Corazón por México	Institutional Revolutionary Party	101,574	0.18	0	6,623,796	11.56	26	35	–35
Fuerza y Corazón por México	Party of the Democratic Revolution	20,374	0.04	0	1,449,660	2.53	0	1	–14
Fuerza y Corazón por México	Common candidates (Note: Of the elected candidates, 29 belong to the National Action Party, 9 to the Institutional Revolutionary Party, and 1 to the Party of the Democratic Revolution.)	17,493,425	30.76	39				–	–
Fuerza y Corazón por México	Total	17,988,043	31.63	42	18,122,831	31.64	66	108	–91
Citizens' Movement		6,446,537	11.34	1	6,497,404	11.34	26	27	+4
Independents		72,012	0.13	1	72,012	0.13	0	1	+1
Non-registered candidates		48,871	0.09	0	49,329	0.09	0	0	0
Total		56,872,152	100.00	300	57,276,599	100.00	200	500	0
Valid votes		56,872,152	96.34		57,276,599	96.32			
Invalid/blank votes		2,162,171	3.66		2,189,869	3.68			
Total votes		59,034,323	100.00		59,466,468	100.00			
Source: INE (PR)

== Aftermath ==
=== Election night ===
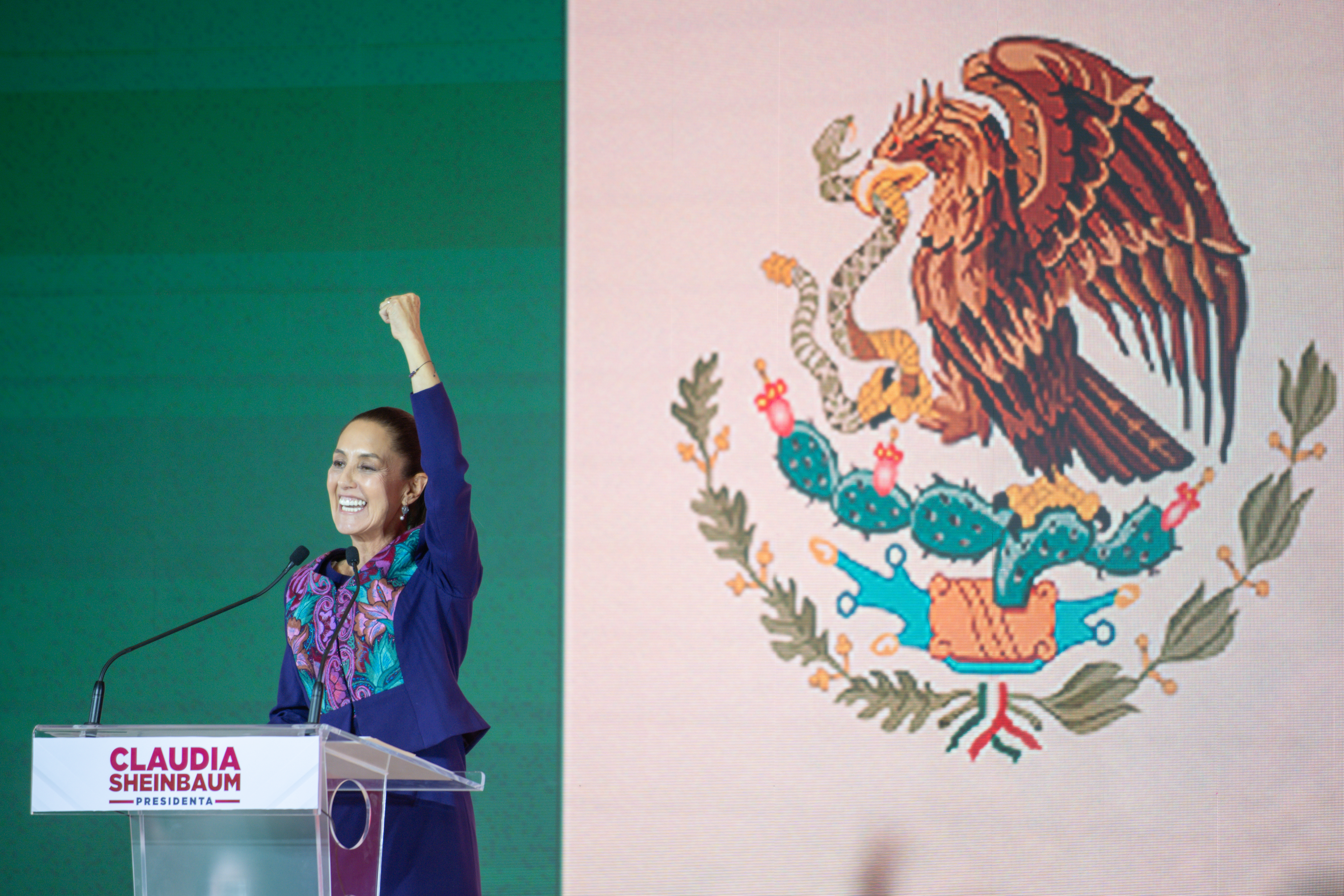
Claudia Sheinbaum during her victory speech at the Zócalo.

At 11:50 PM CST on 2 June, the INE's president, Guadalupe Taddei, declared that according to the INE's Quick Count, Claudia Sheinbaum was the winner of the presidential contest. The Quick Count also projected that Sigamos Haciendo Historia would keep its control of the Congress of the Union, with a supermajority in the Chamber of Deputies and a probable supermajority in the Senate.

Shortly after the INE's announcement, Xóchitl Gálvez and Jorge Máynez called Sheinbaum to congratulate her on her victory. During their respective press conferences, both Gálvez and Máynez publicly conceded, with Máynez highlighting that the results represented the best performance for Citizens' Movement. However, Gálvez later described the electoral campaign as an "unequal competition against the entire state apparatus dedicated to favoring its candidate", adding that she would challenge the result.

Reacting to the result on X, Sheinbaum said that she would not let the electorate down. She later addressed her supporters at the Zócalo in Mexico City, who had gathered at the plaza to celebrate her victory. President Andrés Manuel López Obrador described Sheinbaum's victory as historic and reiterated his pledge not to interfere in her incoming administration.

=== District tally and certification ===
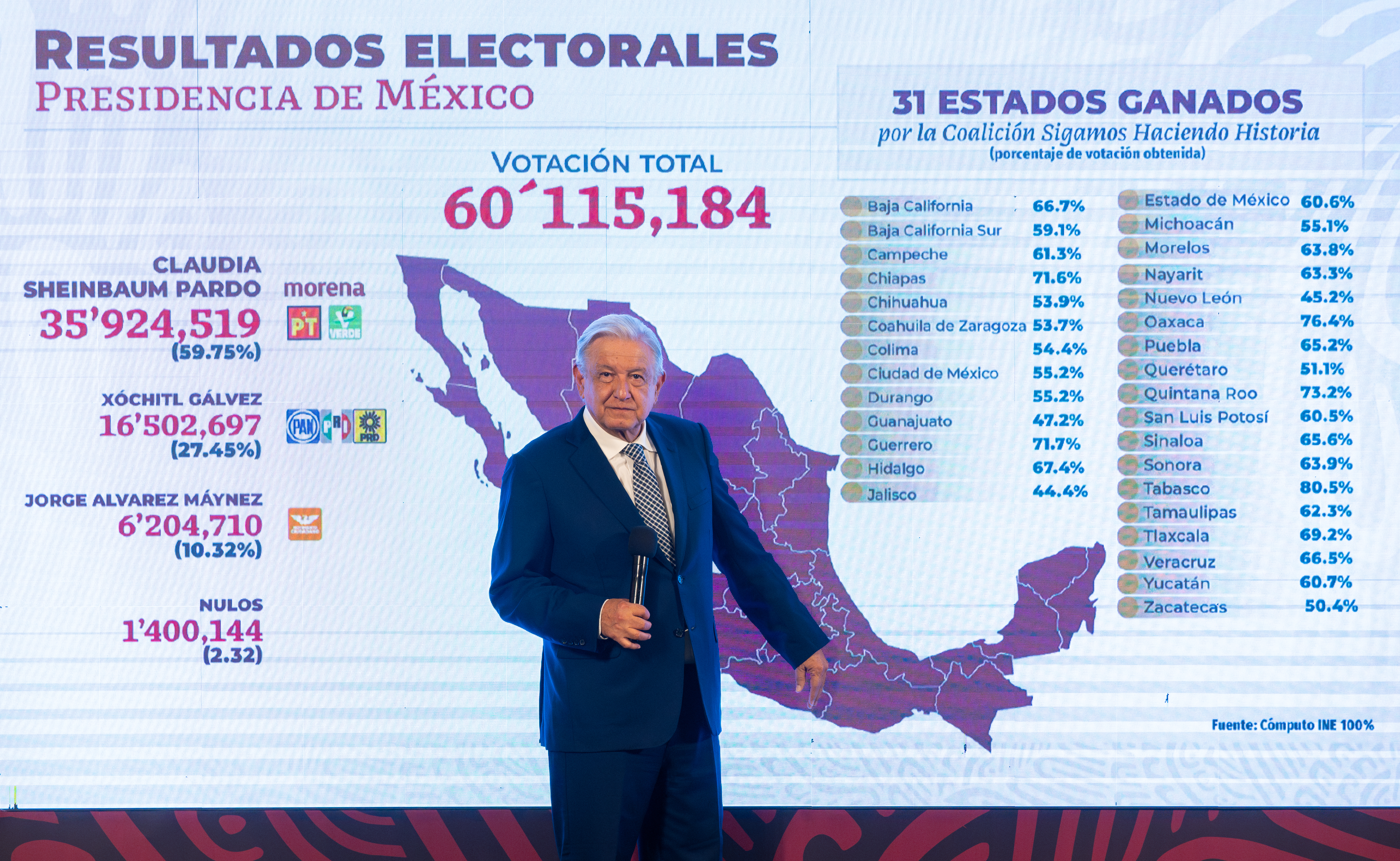
Andrés Manuel López Obrador showing Sheinbaum's margin of victory in one of his mañaneras, 25 July 2024.

The district tally started on 5 June at 8:00 CST. The INE announced it would recount ballots from 60% of the polling stations, a decrease from the 75% recounted during the 2018 election. Xóchitl Gálvez requested that 80% of the votes be recounted, asserting there were irregularities at some polling stations.

On 6 June, the district tally concluded for the presidential election, increasing Sheinbaum's margin of victory by 0.85%. On 9 June, the INE released constituency seats and final vote count results for each district. Projections using the final vote count to calculate party-list deputies and senators confirmed a supermajority in the Chamber of Deputies but not in the Senate, falling three seats short of the two-thirds majority needed to change the Constitution.

On 15 August, after all challenges to the presidential election were resolved, Sheinbaum's victory was officially certified, and she received the certificate designating her as president-elect.

On 21 August, the INE's Commission on Prerogatives and Political Parties unanimously approved a draft assigning party-list deputies and senators.

=== Party registrations ===
On 10 June, for the first time in the party's three-decade-long history, the INE notified the Party of the Democratic Revolution (PRD) that it had failed to meet 3% of the popular vote to keep its registration as a national political party. On 19 June, an auditor was chosen to oversee the party's liquidation, and on 19 September, the INE declared that the PRD had lost its registration.

=== Lawsuits ===
After the election, the National Action Party (PAN), the Institutional Revolutionary Party (PRI), the Party of the Democratic Revolution (PRD), and Citizens' Movement (MC) collectively filed 240 challenges against the presidential election results. The PRD spearheaded most of these challenges, which sought to annul millions of ballots to meet the 3% threshold required to maintain its registration as a national political party. However, by 8 August, the Electoral Tribunal of the Federal Judiciary (TEPJF) had rejected all of the challenges.

For the legislative elections, all political parties challenged the results for deputies and senators, citing allegations of exceeding campaign spending limits, vote buying, voter intimidation, and various irregularities in vote counting. Most of these challenges, when presented to the Electoral Tribunal of the Federal Judiciary, were rejected, and any rulings from lower courts did not alter the overall election results. The only exception was in the 23rd district of the State of Mexico, where Luis Alberto Carballo Gutiérrez's victory certificate was annulled due to his ineligibility, as he was a child support debtor, resulting in his alternate assuming the position instead.

The National Electoral Institute’s (INE) seat allocation for proportional representation seats in the Chamber of Deputies was challenged by opposition parties before the Electoral Tribunal of the Federal Judiciary (TEPJF). The challengers argued that the seat allocation violated the constitutional 8% cap on over-representation established in Article 54 of the Constitution, noting that the Sigamos Haciendo Historia coalition would hold approximately 73% of the seats with less than 60% of the national vote. They contended that the over-representation limit should be applied to individual parties rather than to electoral coalitions as a whole. On 28 August 2024, the TEPJF rejected these challenges, reaffirming its jurisprudence that the 8% over-representation limit applies to individual political parties and not to coalitions. The tribunal ruled that the INE’s methodology was consistent with constitutional and statutory electoral law, citing precedents from its rulings following the 2015 and 2018 elections.

=== Reactions ===
==== Financial markets ====
Amid concerns that a supermajority in both chambers of Congress would lead to anti-market reforms, the peso dropped nearly 4% against the U.S. dollar following initial reporting; by the end of the week, it was down 10% from its pre-election level. From less than 17 to the U.S. dollar on 2 June, the peso fell over the nine days following the election to trade at 18.50 on 11 June, still considerably stronger than the all-time low of over 25 seen at the start of the COVID-19 pandemic in March 2020. On 3 June, the two largest ETFs focused on Mexico (iShares MSCI Mexico ETF EWW and Franklin FTSE Mexico ETF FLMX) dropped more than 10%, the biggest daily decline in four years. The Mexican Stock Exchange ended the 3 June trading day down 6.1%, while the MSCI Mexico Index dropped 8.8%.

==== International ====
- Argentina: The Ministry of Foreign Affairs congratulated Sheinbaum, stating it "renews its willingness to continue developing the bilateral work agenda".
- Belgium: Prime Minister Alexander De Croo congratulated Sheinbaum, describing her victory as an "important milestone."
- Belize: Prime Minister John Briceño congratulated Sheinbaum on her victory.
- Bolivia: President Luis Arce congratulated Sheinbaum, describing her victory as "resounding."
- Brazil: President Luiz Inácio Lula da Silva congratulated Sheinbaum, calling it "a victory for democracy, and also for my great colleague AMLO, who made an extraordinary government".
- Canada: Prime Minister Justin Trudeau welcomed Sheinbaum's election in a tweet, citing an intent to maintain and strengthen Canada-Mexico relations.
- Chile: President Gabriel Boric congratulated Sheinbaum on her victory, stating that "her leadership and her program of social progress inspire the region and continue to unite us as sister countries."
- China: President Xi Jinping congratulated Sheinbaum on her victory, saying he is willing to strengthen strategic communication with the president-elect to lead bilateral relations to a new level and bring more benefits to the two peoples.
- Colombia: President Gustavo Petro and Vice President Francia Márquez congratulated Sheinbaum, with Petro stating that her election was "a victory for the Mexican people and their democracy."
- Costa Rica: President Rodrigo Chaves congratulated Sheinbaum on her victory and sent her best wishes for her future management.
- Cuba: President Miguel Díaz-Canel congratulated Sheinbaum and offered his support "to continue strengthening the close brotherhood that unites our peoples."
- Ecuador: The Foreign Ministry congratulated the people of Mexico for holding democratic elections.
- El Salvador: President Nayib Bukele congratulated Sheinbaum and pledged to "continue working for the inclusive development of our region" through a call.
- European Union: President of the European Commission Ursula von der Leyen congratulated Sheinbaum on her victory, calling her election "historic" as the first woman to preside over Mexico in its democratic history.
- France: President Emmanuel Macron congratulated Sheinbaum and agreed to "work closely on major global challenges," especially climate change and biodiversity loss, and "continue acting in favor of women's rights".
- Germany: Chancellor Olaf Scholz congratulated Sheinbaum and expressed his desire to deepen cooperation between Germany and Mexico.
- Guatemala: President Bernardo Arévalo telephoned Sheinbaum to congratulate her on her victory and discuss future collaborations, stating that Sheinbaum has an "ally ready to work together" with her.
- Honduras: President Xiomara Castro congratulated Sheinbaum in an X post.
- India: Prime Minister Narendra Modi congratulated Sheinbaum, expressing his desire to work with the President-elect to strengthen their cooperation.
- Japan: Prime Minister Fumio Kishida congratulated Sheinbaum and expressed his desire to work with Mexico as a Strategic Global Partner to develop traditional and strong bilateral relations.
- Nicaragua: President Daniel Ortega and Vice President Rosario Murillo congratulated Sheinbaum on her "historic victory."
- Panama: President Laurentino Cortizo congratulated Sheinbaum.
- Paraguay: President Santiago Peña congratulated Sheinbaum and said he hopes they continue working for the well-being of their people.
- Peru: President Dina Boluarte congratulated Sheinbaum in a statement issued by the country's foreign ministry.
- Russia: President Vladimir Putin congratulated Sheinbaum on her victory and highlighted friendly ties between Russia and Mexico, which he described as "traditional".
- Saudi Arabia: Prime Minister Mohammed bin Salman congratulated Sheinbaum on her victory.
- Spain: Prime Minister Pedro Sánchez congratulated Sheinbaum on her victory as Mexico's first female president.
- Ukraine: President Volodymyr Zelenskyy congratulated Sheinbaum on her victory, saying he wished her "much success during her term".
- United Arab Emirates: President Mohamed bin Zayed Al Nahyan congratulated Sheinbaum by phone for winning the election.
- United Nations: Secretary-General António Guterres congratulated Sheinbaum and highlighted the gender perspective.
- United States: President Joe Biden congratulated Sheinbaum, calling it a "historic win" and praising the Mexican people for operating a successful election at all levels.
- Uruguay: President Luis Lacalle Pou congratulated Sheinbaum and wished for closer ties between both countries.
- Venezuela: President Nicolás Maduro congratulated Sheinbaum, calling it a "victory for the great homeland".
