= Opinion polling for the 2024 Mexican general election =

This is a list of public opinion polls relating to the 2024 Mexican general election. Polls have been carried out by various organizations and aggregated by Oraculus, the College of Specialists in Public Opinion Polling and Surveys (CEDE), Polls.mx, Bloomberg, and Expansión Política.

== Graphical summary ==
Local regression of polling conducted up to the 2024 Mexican presidential election (excludes others and undecided)

== Polling aggregations ==
Source of poll aggregation	Dates administered	Dates updated				Lead
Source of poll aggregation	Dates administered	Dates updated	Sheinbaum SHH	Gálvez FCM	Máynez MC	Lead
Oraculus	through May 2024	29 May 2024	53%	36%	11%	17%
CEDE	through 28 May 2024	29 May 2024	56%	33.3%	10.7%	22.7%
Polls.mx	through 29 May 2024	29 May 2024	55%	31%	13%	24%
Bloomberg	through 28 May 2024	29 May 2024	55.3%	34%	10.7%	21.3%
Expansión Política	through 28 May 2024	29 May 2024	53.16%	33.76%	10.36%	19.4%
Average			54.5%	33.6%	11.2%	20.9%

== By candidates ==
=== Campaigning period ===
Polls taken during the official campaigning period (1 March to 29 May 2024).

Fieldwork date	Polling firm	Sample				Others/ Undecided	Lead
Fieldwork date	Polling firm	Sample	Sheinbaum SHH	Gálvez FCM	Máynez MC	Others/ Undecided	Lead
29 May 2024	LaEncuesta.mx	1,800	47.3%	40.7%	8.4%	3.6%	6.6%
25-28 May 2024	Áltica	1,800	50.4%	38.6%	9.7%	1.3%	11.8%
25-28 May 2024	AtlasIntel	4,084	48.2%	34.9%	16.1%	0.8%	13.3%
24-26 May 2024	MEBA	1,000	51.3%	22.9%	10.1%	15.7%	28.4%
21-26 May 2024	Reforma	1,000	55%	35%	10%	–	20%
21-24 May 2024	Mitofsky	1,200	50%	27.4%	10.4%	12.2%	22.6%
19 May 2024	Third presidential debate held.						
11-13 May 2024	LaEncuesta.mx	1,800	47.7%	40.1%	9%	3.2%	7.6%
11 May 2024	C&E Mexico	600	55%	32%	13%	–	23%
3-6 May 2024	Mitofsky	1,600	48.9%	28.1%	10.3%	12.7%	20.8%
4-5 May 2024	TResearch	2,000	52.4%	29%	8.1%	10.5%	23.4%
2-5 May 2024	Áltica	2,500	50%	40%	7%	2%	10%
30 April 2024	C&E Mexico	600	55%	34%	11%	–	21%
29-30 April 2024	LaEncuesta.mx	1,800	48.9%	40.4%	6.9%	3.8%	8.5%
28 April 2024	Second presidential debate held.						
27-28 April 2024	TResearch	2,000	53%	28.5%	7.3%	11.2%	24.5%
26 April 2024	MetricsMX	1,200	54.4%	21.3%	12.8%	11.5%	33.1%
17-24 April 2024	El Financiero	1,360	49%	32%	8%	11%	17%
20-21 April 2024	TResearch	2,000	53.8%	30.1%	4.4%	11.7%	23.7%
19-21 April 2024	MEBA	1,500	51.2%	24.6%	10.7%	13.5%	26.6%
14-16 April 2024	LaEncuesta.mx	1,800	49.7%	40.8%	6.3%	3.2%	8.9%
14 April 2024	C&E Mexico	600	59%	33%	8%	–	26%
13-14 April 2024	TResearch	2,000	54.3%	30.2%	4%	11.5%	24.1%
11-14 April 2024	GEA-ISA	1,070	49%	34%	6%	11%	15%
11-14 April 2024	Áltica	1,000	51%	39%	5%	5%	12%
8-14 April 2024	Enkoll	2,590	54%	30%	7%	9%	24%
10-13 April 2024	Mitofsky	1,600	51.4%	26.7%	9.3%	12.6%	24.7%
7 April 2024	First presidential debate held.						
3-5 April 2024	LaEncuesta.mx	1,800	50.7%	40.9%	4.6%	3.8%	9.8%
1 April 2024	El Financiero	1,200	51%	34%	7%	8%	17%
28-31 March 2024	Áltica	1,000	50%	38%	6%	6%	12%
25 March 2024	MetricsMX	1,200	57.1%	23.7%	4.4%	14.8%	33.4%
22-24 March 2024	MEBA	1,500	53.5%	28.9%	6%	11.6%	24.6%
14-17 March 2024	De las Heras Demotecnia	1,400	63%	15%	2%	20%	48%
14-17 March 2024	Mitofsky	1,600	50.5%	28.8%	4.8%	15.9%	21.7%
12-14 March 2024	LaEncuesta.mx	1,800	49.4%	41.6%	5%	4%	7.8%
11-14 March 2024	Áltica	1,000	51%	37%	6%	6%	14%

=== Precampaigning and intercampaigning periods ===
Polls taken during the precampaigning period (20 November 2023 to 18 January 2024) and the intercampaigning period (19 January to 29 February 2024).

Fieldwork date	Polling firm	Sample					Others/ Undecided	Lead
Fieldwork date	Polling firm	Sample	Sheinbaum SHH	Gálvez FCM	Máynez MC	~~García~~ MC	Others/ Undecided	Lead
27-28 February 2024	MetricsMX	1,200	61%	20%	4.4%	–	14.6%	41%
24-28 February 2024	Enkoll	814	53%	29%	3%	–	15%	24%
23-25 February 2024	El Financiero	1,000	50%	33%	8%	–	8%	17%
22 February 2024	Máynez officially registers his candidacy.							
17-20 February 2024	Mitofsky	1,600	51.6%	27.8%	5.1%	–	15.5%	23.8%
20 February 2024	Gálvez officially registers her candidacy.							
16-19 February 2024	LaEncuesta.mx	1,800	50.4%	40.9%	3.9%	–	4.8%	9.5%
15-19 February 2024	De las Heras Demotecnia	1,400	67%	15%	2%	–	16%	52%
18 February 2024	Sheinbaum officially registers her candidacy.							
10-14 February 2024	Áltica	1,000	51%	35%	4%	–	10%	16%
3-5 February 2024	LaEncuesta.mx	1,800	50.8%	39.9%	4.2%	–	5.1%	10.9%
28-30 January 2024	Áltica	1,000	50%	35%	5%	–	9%	15%
19-22 January 2024	Enkoll	834	54%	27%	3%	–	16%	27%
12-15 January 2024	MEBA	1,500	68.1%	26.6%	5.3%	–	10.3%	41.5%
13-14 January 2024	TResearch	2,000	52%	27.1%	5%	–	15.3%	25.5%
13 January 2024	Rubrum	1,200	53.5%	28.9%	4.5%	–	13.1%	24.1%
10-14 January 2024	De las Heras Demotecnia	1,400	66%	14%	2%	–	18%	52%
10 January 2024	Máynez becomes the sole precandidate for MC.							
9 January 2024	INE announces that no independent candidates collected enough signatures to be eligible.							
18 December 2023	C&E Mexico	600	58%	33%	–	9%	–	25%
10–15 December 2023	Áltica	1,000	48%	36%	–	6%	7%	14%
7–10 December 2023	Mitofsky	1,600	50.2%	25.3%	–	6.3%	18.2%	24.9%
2–5 December 2023	De las Heras Demotecnia	1,400	65%	13%	–	6%	16%	52%
5 December 2023	C&E Mexico	600	55%	36%	–	7%	1%	19%
2 December 2023	García withdraws his candidacy.							
25–28 November 2023	Enkoll	800	49%	23%	–	17%	11%	26%
22–28 November 2023	Reforma	1,000	46%	25%	–	14%	15%	21%
24–25 November 2023	El Financiero	1,000	50%	31%	–	7%	12%	19%
20 November 2023	Gálvez becomes the sole precandidate for Fuerza y Corazón por Mexico.							

=== Prior to the electoral period ===
Polls taken before the precampaigning period (20 November 2023), but after the winners of the internal selection processes of both major coalitions were named.

Fieldwork date	Polling firm	Sample					Others/ Undecided	Lead
Fieldwork date	Polling firm	Sample	Sheinbaum SHH	Gálvez FCM	García MC	Verástegui Independent	Others/ Undecided	Lead
19 November 2023	Sheinbaum becomes the sole precandidate for Sigamos Haciendo Historia.							
17 November 2023	Garcia becomes the sole precandidate for MC.							
10–13 November 2023	De las Heras Demotecnia	1,400	66%	14%	6%	2%	9%	52%
19–28 October 2023	El Financiero	1,620	46%	28%	8%	–	18%	18%
20–24 October 2023	Enkoll	1,008	50%	27%	15%	–	8%	23%
16 October 2023	MEBA	1,500	60.8%	26.7%	9.7%	2.8%	–	34.1%
4 October 2023	Universal	1,200	50%	20%	7%	4%	19%	30%
19–25 September 2023	Covarrubias y Asociados	1,500	64%	17%	6%	–	13%	41%
25 September 2023	De las Heras Demotecnia	1,200	68%	14%	4%	2%	12%	54%
16–21 September 2023	GEA-ISA	1,070	53%	34%	7%	2%	4%	19%
13 September 2023	Enkoll	1,205	55%	22%	6%	0%	17%	33%
6 September 2023	Sheinbaum wins the internal selection process of the MORENA-PT-PVEM alliance.							
31 August 2023	Gálvez wins the internal selection process of Frente Amplio por México.							

=== Possible candidates ===
Fieldwork date	Polling firm											Others	Lead
Fieldwork date	Polling firm	Sheinbaum Morena	Ebrard Morena	Colosio MC	Anaya PAN	Creel PAN	Tellez PAN	del Mazo PRI	Ruiz Massieu PRI	de la Madrid PRI	Noroña PT	Others	Lead
June 2023	Mexico Elige	35.9%	–	8.4%	–	24.5%	–	–	7.9%	–	17.3%	2.1% Velasco, 2.1% De Hoyos	11.4%
June 2023	Mexico Elige	–	35.9%	–	–	–	19.5%	–	–	16.4%	22.1%	1.8% Velasco, 1.3% Mancera, 1.8% De Hoyos, 1.3% Delgado	16.4%
February 2023	El Financiero	45%	–	9%	18%	–	–	14%	–	–	–	N/A	27%
October 2022	El Financiero	44%	–	9%	18%	–	–	13%	–	–	–	N/A	26%
August 2022	Reforma	34%	–	28%	16%	–	–	10%	–	–	–	N/A	6%
May 2022	Reforma	33%	–	26%	13%	–	–	7%	–	–	–	N/A	7%
December 2021	Reforma	31%	–	27%	16%	–	–	10%	–	–	–	N/A	11%

== By alliances ==
Pollster	Date	Sample size	Margin of error	SHH	FCM	MC	Others/ Undecided	Lead
C&E Mexico	18 December 2023	600	4%	59%	34%	7%	–	25%
CELAG	18 August 2023	2,000	2.19%	45.4%	18.2%	10.5%	25.9%	27.2%
