= San Pedro Garza García stage collapse =

Fatal accident during a political rally in Mexico

- Date: 22 May 2024
- Time: 20:08 CST (UTC-6)
- Location: San Pedro Garza García, Nuevo León, Mexico; 25°40′36″N 100°24′5″W
- Deaths: 10
- Injuries: 213

On 22 May 2024, at 20:08 CST (UTC−6), a stage collapsed during a campaign rally for mayoral candidate Lorenia Canavati of the Citizens' Movement in San Pedro Garza García in the northeastern Mexican state of Nuevo León, killing 10 people and injuring 213 others.

== Background ==
=== Campaign rally ===
As part of the end of her campaign, a closing campaign rally was held at 18:00 CST on 22 May 2024 for Lorenia Canavati, who was running for mayor of San Pedro Garza García as the candidate of the Citizens' Movement in the 2024 local elections. Other Citizen's Movement candidates were invited to appear with Canavati, including Jorge Álvarez Máynez, the presidential candidate; Martha Patricia Herrera González, a senatorial candidate for Nuevo León; and Javier González, a candidate for federal deputy. The local band Bronco was scheduled to perform after the political portion of the rally.

A temporary stage was erected on the El Obispo baseball field prior to the campaign rally. According to Máynez, civil defense teams had ensured the stage was secure.

During the rally, around 10,000 people were in attendance.

=== Weather conditions ===
On 22 May 2024 at 18:28 CST, the National Meteorological Service (SMN) issued a warning from 18:00 to 21:00 for heavy rainfall, strong winds of up to 70 kph (40 mph) and tornadoes across northern Mexico, including in Nuevo León. A similar warning had been issued previously at 13:13 CST from 12:00 to 15:00.

== Collapse ==
At 20:08 CST, the wind picked up as the candidates on stage were chanting campaign slogans. A gust of wind caused a large screen and stage rigging to topple towards the candidates, prompting them to rush off stage. The collapsing structure struck the attendees in the front rows and caused those behind them to run away. Some members of the crowd were buried under metal poles.

According to President Andrés Manuel López Obrador, the collapse was caused by strong winds. After seeing videos of the incident, some meteorological experts conjectured that it was caused by a microburst.

== Victims ==
The day after the collapse, nine people were confirmed dead by the government: four at the site of the incident, three at a clinic, and two at a hospital. On 17 June, one of the critically injured victims died, raising the death toll to 10. One of the fatalities was a child.

As of 29 May, the state government had confirmed 213 non-fatal injuries. Senator Laura Ballesteros, Máynez's campaign coordinator, required surgery for a broken ankle.

== Responses ==
=== Immediate response ===
Several members of the municipal police, civil protection, National Guard, and the Mexican Army, who were present to provide security for the candidates and attendees due to the wave of violence affecting the region, began rescue operations, first aid, and the transport of the injured to various hospitals. The Ministry of National Defense activated Plan DN-III-E to address the emergency.

Immediately following the incident, Jorge Máynez reported that he was safe. Canavati expressed sorrow over the collapse and assured that she was coordinating with authorities to provide support.

Governor Samuel García released a video on his social media platforms urging citizens to take shelter due to the strong winds. He then visited the scene of the incident, monitored the situation, and stayed with the hospitalized victims. Throughout the night, he provided updates to the media. In a televised announcement the next day, García announced that the state government would take care of any funeral costs, contact the victims' families, and provide scholarships and financial support to children who lost their parents in the incident.

Miguel Treviño de Hoyos, the mayor of San Pedro Garza García, established a special hotline for citizens to obtain information about the victims' whereabouts, psychological and legal assistance, and funeral services.

=== Domestic reactions ===
President Andrés Manuel López Obrador offered his condolences to "family members, friends of the victims and political supporters". The next day, López Obrador publicly cleared the Citizens' Movement of responsibility, saying that they held a campaign rally "like everybody else".

Claudia Sheinbaum, the presidential candidate of the Sigamos Haciendo Historia coalition, stated she hoped "everything is well with the candidates and attendees" at the event. Fuerza y Corazón por México candidate Xóchitl Gálvez also expressed her condolences.

Máynez suspended his upcoming campaign events and visited the injured people in hospitals. Mariana Rodríguez, the Citizens' Movement candidate for mayor of neighboring Monterrey, also cancelled events and visited the injured with Máynez. Claudia Sheinbaum cancelled political events for the following day, including one in Monterrey.

=== International reactions ===
Delphine Borione, French ambassador to Mexico; Gautier Mignot, EU ambassador to Mexico; and Roger Rigaud, United States Consul General in Monterrey, posted statements on X expressing their condolences. Condolences were also sent by the embassies of Spain and Norway.

=== Investigation ===
On 23 May 2024, the state attorney general's office launched an investigation to determine the causes of the incident.

== See also ==
- Indiana State Fair stage collapse
