= Jorge Máynez =

Mexican politician (born 1985)

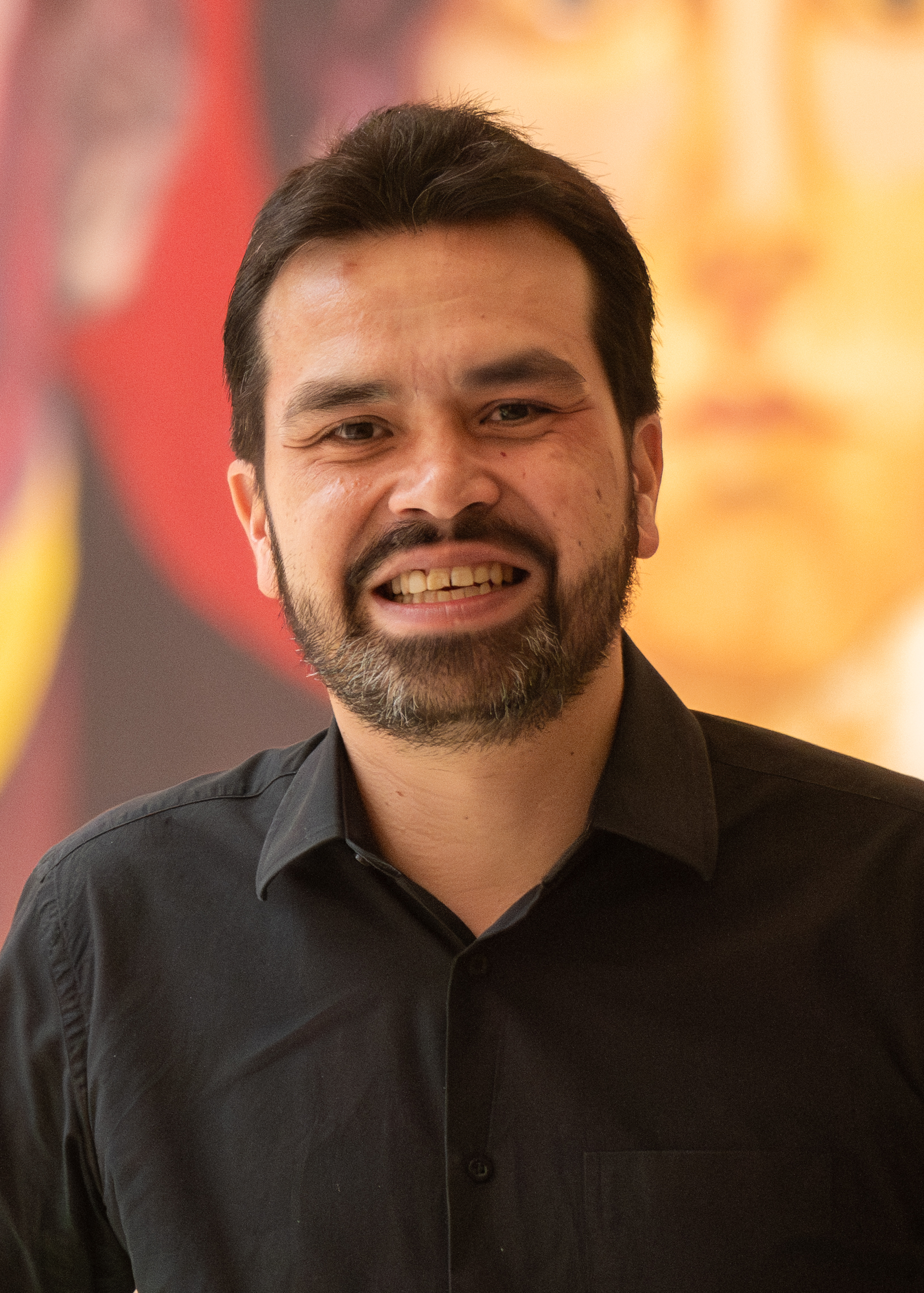
- Máynez in 2024

National Coordinator of Citizens' Movement
- Incumbent
- Assumed office 5 December 2024
- Preceded by: Dante Delgado Rannauro

Member of the Chamber of Deputies
- In office 1 September 2021 – 28 February 2024
- Constituency: First electoral region
- In office 1 September 2015 – 31 August 2018
- Constituency: First electoral region

Member of the Congress of Zacatecas
- In office 7 September 2010 – 6 September 2013
- Preceded by: Refugio Medina Hernández
- Succeeded by: Cliserio del Real Hernández
- Constituency: Zacatecas' 5th district

Personal details
- Born: 8 July 1985 (age 40) Zacatecas, Zacatecas, Mexico
- Party: Citizens' Movement (2013–present)
- Other political affiliations: Institutional Revolutionary Party (2010–2013); New Alliance Party (2010); Party of the Democratic Revolution (2003–2009)
- Spouse: Karina Gidi (m. 2015; div. 2016)
- Domestic partner: Sarah Aguilar Flaschka
- Children: 2
- Education: ITESO (BA); Monterrey Institute of Technology and Higher Education (MPA)
- Website: maynez.com.mx

Jorge Álvarez Máynez (born 8 July 1985) is a Mexican politician currently serving as the national coordinator of Citizens' Movement. He was elected as a state deputy to the Congress of Zacatecas in 2010 and as a federal deputy to the Congress of the Union in 2015 and 2021. In 2024, he was nominated as Citizens' Movement's presidential candidate for the 2024 general election.

== Early years and education ==
Máynez was born in Zacatecas, Zacatecas, on 8 July 1985 to Felipe Álvarez Calderón and Gabriela Máynez. He has one older sister, Ana Gabriela. His father was the founder of the Communist Party of Zacatecas.

=== Education ===
Máynez earned his bachelor's degree in international relations at the ITESO, Universidad Jesuita de Guadalajara, in 2006. Following this, he enrolled at the Monterrey Institute of Technology and Higher Education (ITESM), where he obtained a master's degree in public administration and public policies in 2008, followed by a master's degree in international studies in 2010. In 2019, he earned a master's degree in constitutional law and human rights at the Centro de Estudios Jurídicos Carbonell.

== Early political career ==
In 2003, Máynez joined the Party of the Democratic Revolution (PRD). From 2004 to 2007, he served as a council member in the municipality of Zacatecas during Gerardo de Jesús Félix Domínguez's tenure as municipal president. From 2007 to 2010, he served as a council member in the municipality of Guadalupe.

=== Local deputy ===
In the 2010 state elections in Zacatecas, he was nominated by the New Alliance Party as a deputy to the Congress of Zacatecas, backed by the coalition Primero Zacatecas, comprising the Institutional Revolutionary Party (PRI) and the Ecologist Green Party of Mexico. He was elected to represent Zacatecas's 5th district from 2010 to 2013.

During his tenure, he caucused with the PRI and served as the president of the Municipal Strengthening Commission and secretary of the Culture Commission. In 2011, he sponsored a civil union bill, which was met with opposition from the National Action Party, resulting in its committee stall.

In April 2013, Máynez announced that he was joining Citizen's Movement and contending for municipal president of Guadalupe in the 2013 Zacatecas state elections. He placed third, receiving only 12.9% of the vote.

=== Role in Citizens' Movement ===
Initially running as an independent candidate for municipal president of Guadalupe in the 2013 Zacatecas state elections, Máynez announced in April 2013 that he would run as Citizens' Movement's candidate. He finished in third place, securing just 12.9% of the vote.

After the election, he served as the party's National Secretary for Organization and Political Action from 2013 to 2018.

== Chamber of Deputies ==
=== Elections ===
In the 2015 and 2021 legislative elections, Máynez was elected as a deputy through Citizens' Movement's proportional representation list, representing the first electoral region.

=== Tenure ===
On 29 July 2021, Máynez was unanimously designated as the parliamentary coordinator of the Citizen's Movement caucus in the Chamber of Deputies for the LXV Legislature. He served in this position until February 2024, when he was succeeded by Braulio López Ochoa Mijares.

In April 2022, Máynez directed his party to join opposition parties in voting against López Obrador's proposed energy reform, which failed to reach the two-thirds majority needed to pass. He claimed that the reform would increase tariffs, delay progress in the transition to clean energy, and violate international agreements. Days later, he voted for the president's backup plan, a Mining Law reform, which nationalized lithium.

In June 2022, at the invitation of the Verkhovna Rada, Máynez and three other deputies traveled to Ukraine to show support for the country during the Russian invasion of Ukraine. However, his visit was criticized as "war tourism", and many criticized his prioritizing of the war in Ukraine over the existing violence in the state of Zacatecas. In response, the deputies stated that the trip was self-funded, and Máynez emphasized that he was working on legislation related to security issues in Mexico.

Throughout late 2022, Máynez voiced opposition to López Obrador's proposed electoral reform, which he deemed anti-democratic. In December 2022, he voted against the reform, which failed to reach a two-thirds majority. Máynez also voted against the backup reform, "Plan B", which passed with a majority. Once it passed, Máynez filed an amparo to delay and cancel the law. Máynez accused the Institutional Revolutionary Party of breaking an agreement to deny a quorum to prevent a vote on "Plan B", which other opposition parties had followed by not voting.

On 27 February 2024, Máynez sought temporary leave from his seat to pursue the presidency in the 2024 general election. During his absence, Martín Vivanco Lira was to assume his role but declined to be sworn in. The Federal Electoral Tribunal ordered Carlos Alberto León García to fill in the vacancy, and he was sworn in on 30 April.

=== Commission assignments ===
In the LXIII Legislature (2015–2018):

- Public Education and Educational Services Commission
- Culture and Cinematography Commission

In the LXV Legislature (2021–2024):

- Social Economy and Cooperative Development Commission
- Metropolitan Areas Commission

== 2024 presidential campaign ==
=== Nomination ===
On 19 November 2023, Máynez joined the presidential campaign of Samuel García, the presidential candidate for Citizens' Movement and governor of Nuevo León. However, on 2 December 2023, García withdrew from the race due to a political crisis over the appointment of an interim governor to replace him, prompting Citizens' Movement to select another candidate. On 9 January 2024, García announced that the party had selected Máynez as the new presidential candidate, officially confirming him as the nominee the next day. Máynez formally registered his candidacy on 22 February 2024.

=== General election ===
In his platform, Máynez called for increasing the use of solar and wind energy, increasing nearshoring, raising the minimum wage to MXN $10,000 a month, a 40-hour work week, demilitarisation, and the legalization and regulation of marijuana. Positioning himself as an alternative to Claudia Sheinbaum and Xóchitl Gálvez, Máynez focused on appealing to younger voters, frequently visiting universities during the campaign.

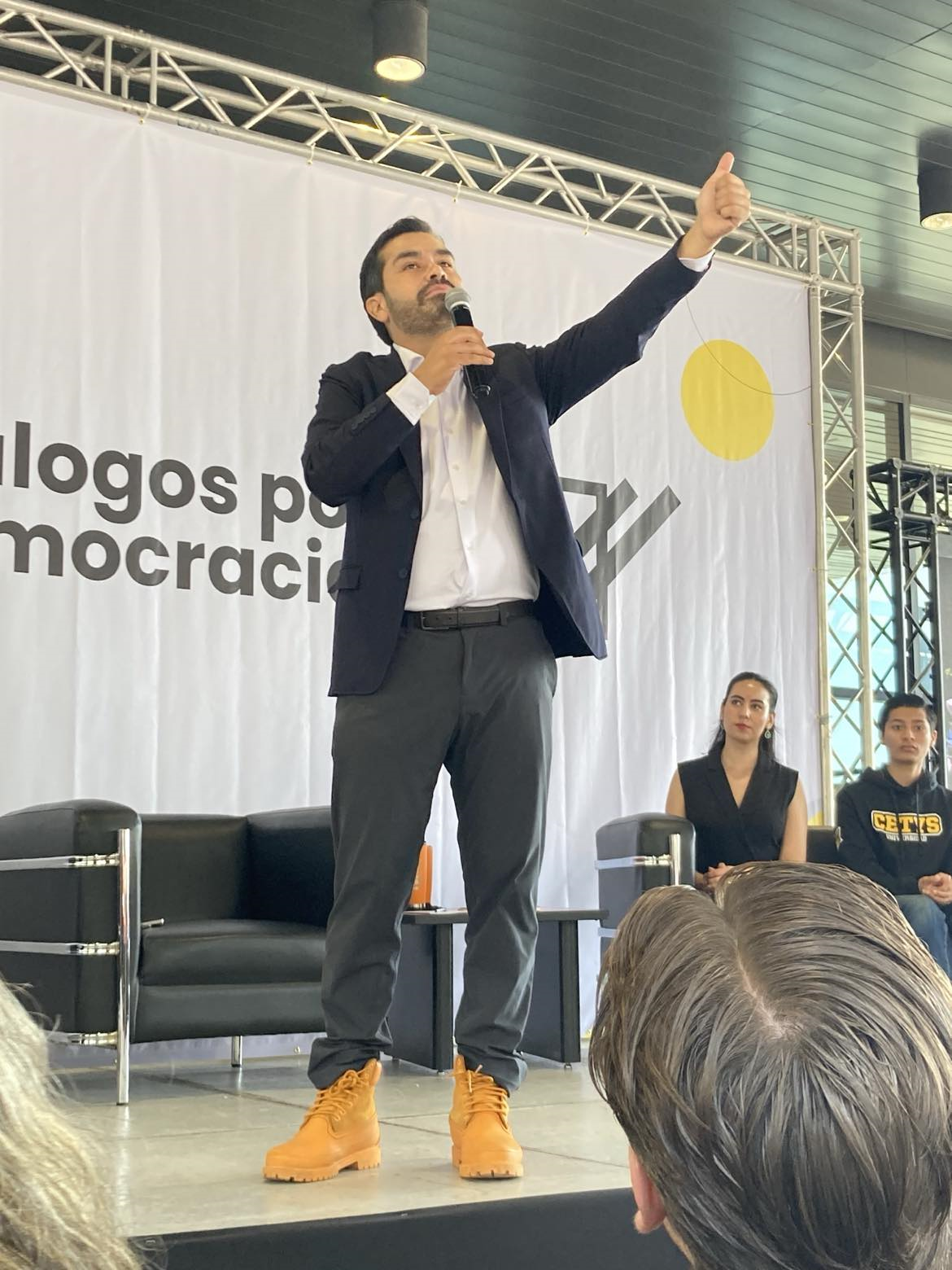
Máynez speaking at a campaign event during the 2024 presidential election.

Polling initially indicated that Máynez was the least known candidate out of the three, with low recognition until the first presidential debate on 7 April, where he went viral due to memes about his constant smiling. By the second debate, some of Máynez's polling numbers had broken into the double digits, hovering around 10%. By the end of the campaign, many polling companies noted that Máynez experienced the most growth in recognition and support, ranking second in approval, behind Sheinbaum but ahead of Gálvez.

Throughout the campaign, leaders of Fuerza y Corazón por México repeatedly urged Máynez to step down and join their coalition, which he rejected. On 14 May, Alejandro Moreno Cárdenas offered to resign as president of the Institutional Revolutionary Party (PRI), but Máynez dismissed the offer as desperate. Luis Donaldo Colosio Riojas, a member of Citizens' Movement, urged either Máynez or Gálvez to withdraw in support of the other to form an opposition to Sigamos Haciendo Historia.

On 22 May, a campaign event attended by Máynez for the Citizens' Movement mayoral candidate in San Pedro Garza García, Nuevo León, saw the stage get toppled by strong winds while he was speaking, killing ten people and injuring 213 others. Máynez was unharmed and suspended his campaign to visit the wounded, resuming activities on 24 May.

A song called Presidente Máynez, performed by Yuawi López, was released on 6 March 2024 as part of Máynez's campaign. It reached #2 on the Viral 50 in Mexico on 12 April, reaching the top spot on 15 April. By the end of the campaigning period, it had garnered over 6.7 million views on YouTube and over 4.6 million streams on Spotify.

The election was held on 2 June 2024, with Máynez receiving 10.32% of the vote. Máynez conceded after the INE's Quick Count announcement, highlighting that the results represented the best performance for Citizens' Movement in a presidential election.

== Personal life ==
In 2015, he married actress Karina Gidi; the following year, they divorced. He had his first child in 2018 with his partner, Sarah Aguilar Flaschka. In 2023, he had a second child.
