= Emilia Gómez Bravo =

Mexican politician

Senator of the Congress of the Union from the Federal District
- In office 1 September 2000 – 31 August 2006
- Preceded by: María de los Ángeles Moreno
- Succeeded by: René Arce Islas

Personal details
- Born: 6 October 1954 (age 71) Mexico City, Mexico
- Party: PVEM
- Occupation: Politician

Emilia Patricia Gómez Bravo (born 6 October 1954) is a Mexican politician affiliated with the Ecologist Green Party of Mexico. As of 2014 she served as Senator of the LVIII and LIX Legislatures of the Mexican Congress representing the Federal District.
