= René Arce Islas =

Mexican politician (born 1953)

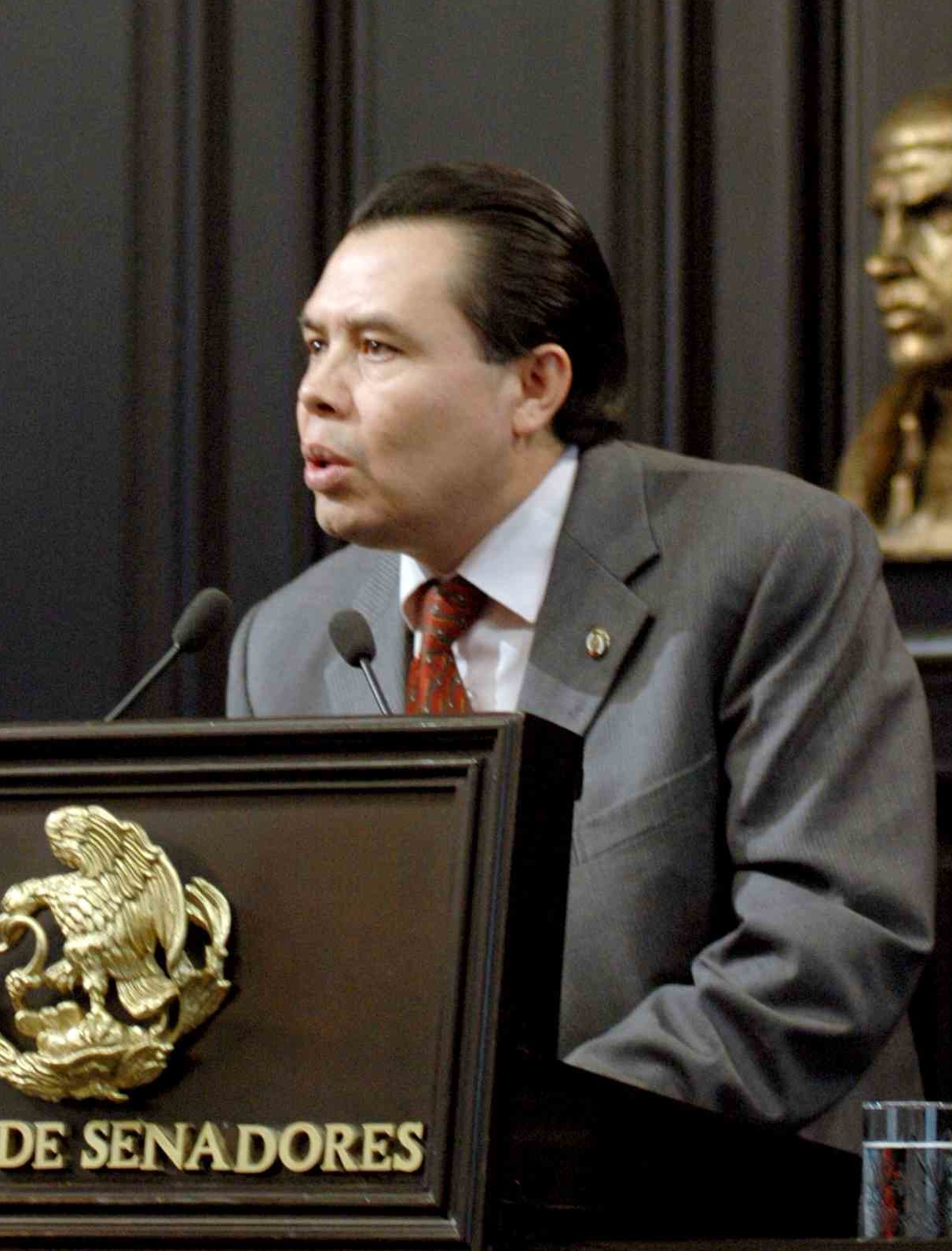

Senator of the Congress of the Union from the Federal District
- In office 1 September 2006 – 31 August 2012
- Preceded by: Emilia Gómez Bravo
- Succeeded by: Mario Martín Delgado

Personal details
- Born: 22 October 1953 (age 72) Oaxaca, Oaxaca, Mexico
- Party: PRD (1989–2011); PVEM (2011–present)
- Occupation: Senator and Deputy

René Arce Islas (born 22 October 1953) is a Mexican politician affiliated with the PVEM. He served as Deputy of the LIX Legislature of the Mexican Congress representing the Federal District and as Senator during the LX and LXI Legislatures, then with the PRD.

In 2011 he disaffiliated of the PRD.
