= Alberto Anaya =

Mexican politician

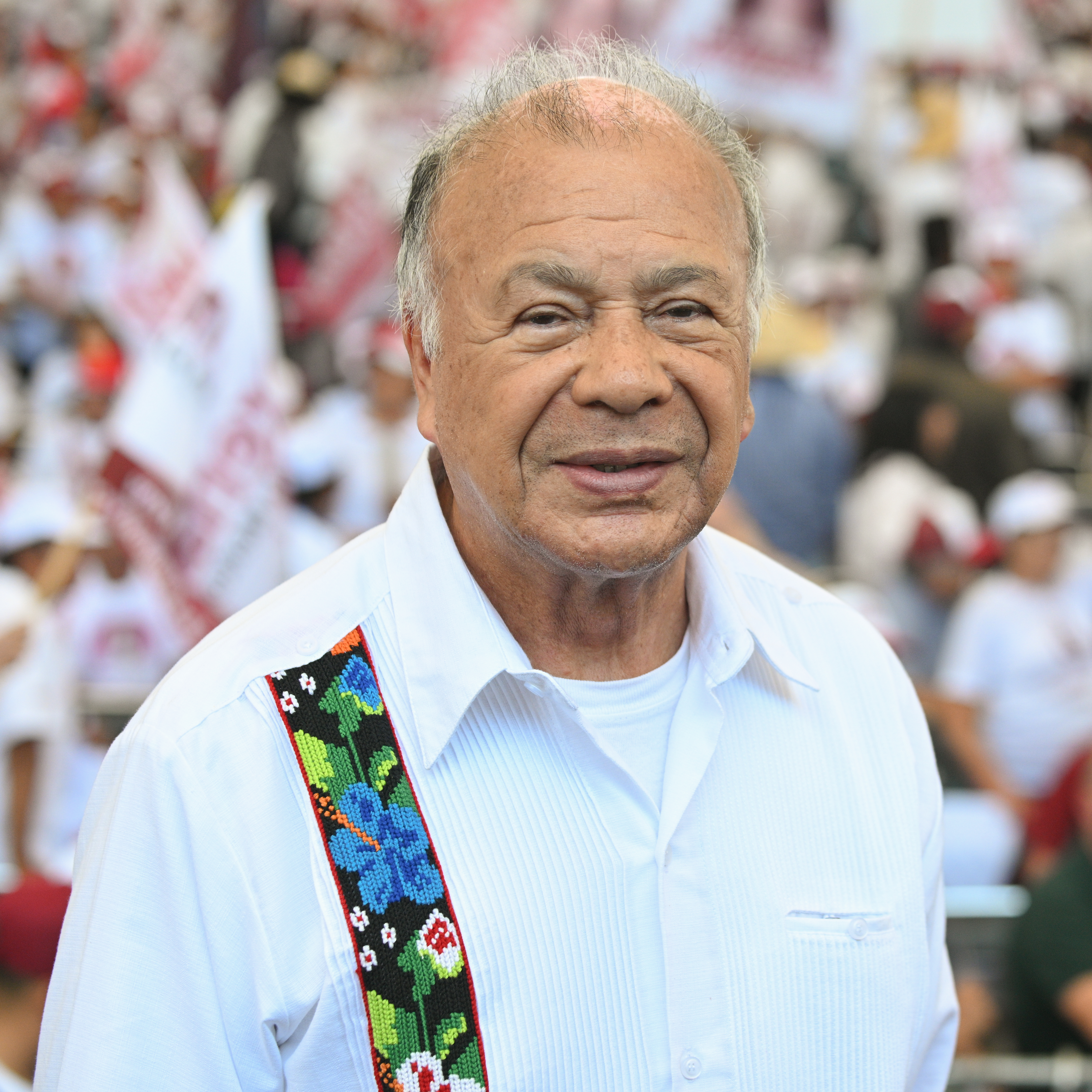

President of the Labor Party
- Incumbent
- Assumed office 8 December 1990
- Preceded by: Party established

Member of the Chamber of Deputies Proportional representation
- In office 1 September 2012 – 31 August 2015

Senator for Mexico National list
- In office 1 September 2006 – 31 August 2012

Personal details
- Born: Alberto Anaya Gutiérrez; 15 November 1946 (age 79) Aguascalientes, Aguascalientes, Mexico
- Party: Labor Party (1990–present)

Alberto Anaya Gutiérrez (born 15 November 1946) is a Mexican politician and senator. He is the founder of the Labor Party.

He has been a federal deputy, senator and coordinator of its parliamentary group.

He studied economics at the UNAM.

In 1990, he founded the PT with several work unions, some left student organizations and some neighborhood organizations, the PRI even accused the party to have influence of Raúl Salinas, brother of former PRI President Carlos Salinas de Gortari. The PT enjoys support in Anaya's home state of Aguascalientes, Nuevo León, Veracruz, Mexico City, and other parts of Mexico. Anaya has both a democratic and socialist background; he led a social movement called "Tierra y Libertad" in the 1980s.

In the 2006 Mexican election, he supported the Alliance for the Good of All, and in the 2018 Mexican election, he led the Together We Will Make History coalition.

Upon his release, he began his drive to form his political party, after having been closely linked to other democratic and socialist parties, some civilian organizations. In 2008 and 2009 he worked closely with former PRD presidential candidate Andrés Manuel López Obrador, fighting the oil privatization in México. The PT is member of FAP (Frente Amplio Progresista - Wide Progressive Coalition).

The PT publishes several magazines, among them: Unidad Nacional and a magazine for analysis and social research: Poder Popular.

On 29 March 2009, the North Korean government's Korean Central News Agency reported Alberto Anaya's declaration of support for the Government of North Korea. On 12 September 2017, nine days after North Korea tested its first Hydrogen bomb the North Korean government's Korean Central News Agency reported Alberto Anaya had sent greetings to Kim Jong Un stating "The Korean people's heroic struggle for the country's sovereignty and the dignity of the nation and peace of the Korean Peninsula and the rest of the world serves as a model of all the revolutionaries and the progressive peoples struggling for global independence."
