= Fuerza y Corazón por México =

Political alliance in Mexico

Strength and Heart for Mexico Fuerza y Corazón por México
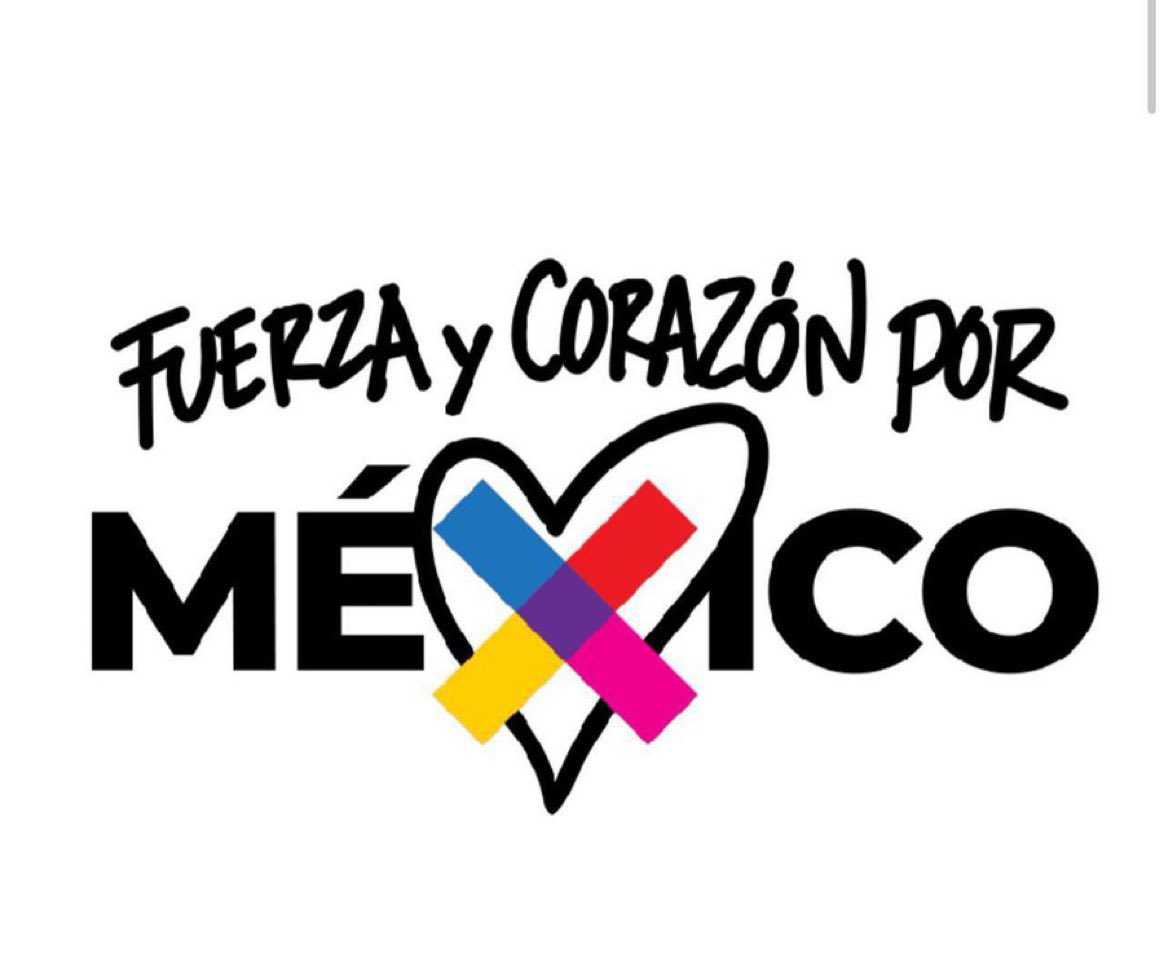
- Presidential candidate: Xóchitl Gálvez
- Party presidents: Marko Antonio Cortés Mendoza; Alejandro Moreno Cárdenas; Jesús Zambrano Grijalva
- Founded: 26 June 2023
- Dissolved: 19 September 2024
- Preceded by: Va por México
- Ideology: Big tent
- Member parties: National Action Party (PAN); Institutional Revolutionary Party (PRI); Party of the Democratic Revolution (PRD)
- Chamber of Deputies: 108 / 500
- Senate of the Republic: 40 / 128

Fuerza y Corazón por México (English: Strength and Heart for Mexico), previously called the Broad Front for Mexico (Spanish: Frente Amplio por México), was a big tent political coalition formed by three Mexican political parties: the conservative National Action Party (PAN), the catch-all Institutional Revolutionary Party (PRI), and the social-democratic Party of the Democratic Revolution (PRD).

== History ==
=== Background ===
Va por México was an electoral coalition made up of the National Action Party (PAN), Institutional Revolutionary Party (PRI), and Party of the Democratic Revolution (PRD) that competed in the 2021 general and the 2022 and 2023 state elections.

=== Creation ===
The leaders of the National Action Party (PAN), the Institutional Revolutionary Party (PRI), and the Party of the Democratic Revolution (PRD) announced at a press conference on Monday, June 26, 2023, that they had formed a political bloc per Article 85 of the General Law of Political Parties with the aim of accomplishing common non-electoral political and social objectives through targeted and coordinated actions and strategies.

Frente Amplio por México chose their de facto presidential contender through an internal selection procedure. Candidates had to gather 150,000 signatures in the first round, with at least 1,000 signatures coming from 17 of the 32 states in the union. At this point, Xóchitl Gálvez, Beatriz Paredes, Santiago Creel, and Enrique de la Madrid were the four candidates who made it through.

Eventually, Senator Xóchitl Gálvez was selected as its candidate for president in the 2024 general election. On 11 November 2023, it adopted its current name of Fuerza y Corazón por México.

== Election results ==
=== Presidential elections ===
Election year	Candidate	Votes	%	Outcome	Notes
2024	Xóchitl Gálvez	16,502,697	28.11	✗ Lost	

=== Congressional elections ===
==== Chamber of Deputies ====
Election	Constituency		PR		No. of seats	Position	Presidency
Election	Votes	%	Votes	%	No. of seats	Position	Presidency
2024	17,988,043	31.63	18,122,831	31.64	108 / 500	Opposition	Claudia Sheinbaum

==== Senate ====
Election	Constituency		PR		No. of seats	Position	Presidency
Election	Votes	%	Votes	%	No. of seats	Position	Presidency
2024	17,786,011	31.17	18,000,854	31.23	40 / 128	Opposition	Claudia Sheinbaum

== See also ==
- Sigamos Haciendo Historia, rival political alliance
