= El Financiero =

Mexican daily newspaper

- Type: Daily newspaper
- Owner(s): Grupo Multimedia Lauman, S.A.P.I. de C.V.
- Founder: Rogelio Cárdenas Sarmiento
- Founded: December 15, 1981; 44 years ago
- Language: Spanish
- Circulation: 91,230 (2021)
- ISSN: 2007-7262
- Website: elfinanciero.com.mx

El Financiero ([el finanˈsjeɾo], "The Financial") is a Mexican national daily newspaper covering business and the financial markets. It is owned by Grupo Multimedia Lauman, S.A.P.I. de C.V. and has offices in the Miguel Hidalgo borough of Mexico City.

== History ==
El Financiero began publication on October 15, 1981. It was founded by Rogelio Cárdenas Sarmiento, whose father, Rogelio Cárdenas Pérez Redondo, had also worked in the newspaper business for Últimas Noticias and Excélsior, and originally had a staff of 35. It was the country's first daily financial newspaper. Considered one of just two truly independent dailies in Mexico City in the late 1980s and early 1990s (alongside La Jornada), in the 1988 Mexican general election, it uncovered fraud in the general election and was subject to advertising boycotts by the administration of Carlos Salinas de Gortari; in addition to losing all its advertising from state-owned banks, the newspaper was barred for several years from having a reporter on the presidential press plane, as the administration did not like its reporting on foreign debt negotiations. At one time, French business magazine L'Expansion rated El Financiero the world's fifth-best financial newspaper. By the time of Cárdenas's death of cancer in 2003, the newspaper had a circulation of 140,000 during the week and a staff of 1,200. At that time, his son, Rogelio Cárdenas Estandía, and his widow, María del Pilar Estandía González Luna, took control of the business.

In 2012, the Cárdenas family, having struggled to improve the publication's finances in the years after Rogelio Cárdenas's death, sold El Financiero to Grupo Multimedia Lauman, controlled by Manuel Arroyo, who also owns the audiovisual production business Comtelsat. The sale price was reported as US$5 million. The next year, the newspaper partnered with Bloomberg L.P. to launch a new business news TV channel in Mexico and Central America. Grupo Lauman then purchased the Mexican operation of Fox Sports in 2021.

== See also ==
- List of newspapers in Mexico
