= Marko Antonio Cortés Mendoza =

Mexican politician (born 1977)

Marko Cortés Mendoza
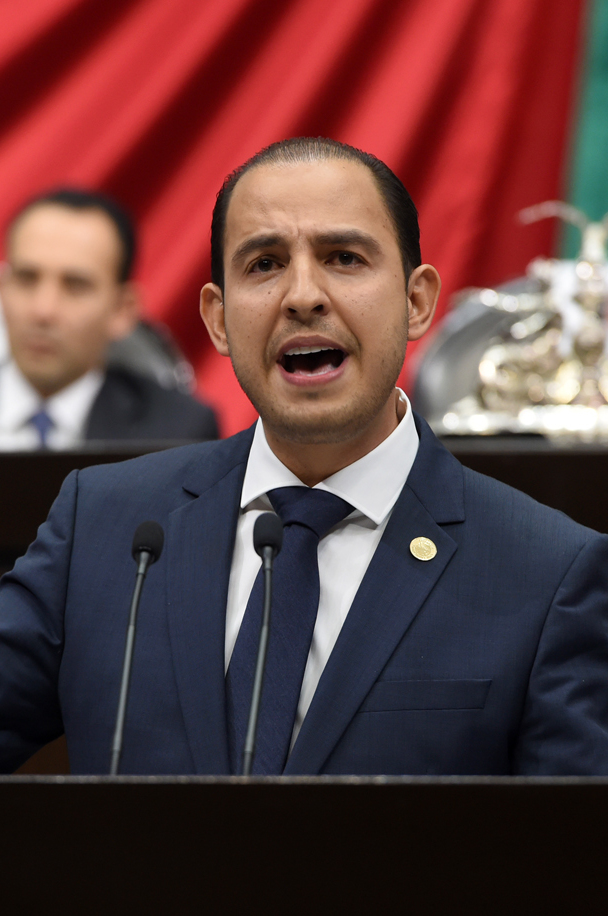
- Cortés in 2015

President of the National Action Party
- In office 14 October 2018 – 18 November 2024
- Preceded by: Marcelo Torres Cofiño
- Succeeded by: Jorge Romero Herrera

Deputy of the Congress of the Union by Proportional Representation
- In office 1 September 2015 – 31 August 2018
- In office 1 September 2003 – 31 August 2006

Senator of the Congress of the Union from Michoacán
- In office 1 September 2006 – 31 August 2012
- Preceded by: Antonio García Torres
- Succeeded by: Raúl Morón Orozco

Personal details
- Born: 17 October 1977 (age 48) Zamora, Michoacán, Mexico
- Party: National Action Party
- Spouse: Marisol Torres Ibarrola (m. 2008)
- Children: 3
- Education: Universidad Michoacana de San Nicolás de Hidalgo (BS); Monterrey Institute of Technology and Higher Education (MBA)

Marko Antonio Cortés Mendoza (born 17 October 1977) is a Mexican politician affiliated with the National Action Party (PAN). He currently serves in the Chamber of Deputies for the LXIII Legislature of the Mexican Congress, representing the state of Michoacán and the fifth electoral region.

== Personal life and education ==
Cortés Mendoza holds an undergraduate degree in accounting from the Universidad Michoacana de San Nicolás de Hidalgo. He began but never completed studies for a master's degree from the Instituto Tecnológico Autónomo de México.

== Political career ==
Cortés Mendoza has been an active member of the PAN in Michoacán since 1996. He began his career in the party as its accountant in Morelia and became the state party's Secretary of Youth Action in 1998; he would serve as the national youth action coordinator for the party from 2001 to 2003, during which time he worked in the Secretariat of Social Development.

From 2003 to 2006, Cortés served his first term as a federal deputy in the LIX Legislature. He sat on commissions including Finances and Public Credit, Youth and Sports, Labor and Social Welfare, and Special on Childhood, Teens and Families.

In 2006, he was elected senator and served during the LX and LXI Legislatures. He was the secretary of the Federalism and Radio, Television, and Film Commissions, also sitting on those for Tourism, Library and Editorial Matters, and Bicameral for the Canal del Congreso.

In 2011 and 2012, Cortés ran for the municipal presidency of Morelia, losing both in the first election which was annulled and on the second attempt. In 2014, he was a precandidate for Governor of Michoacán.

The PAN returned Cortés to the Chamber of Deputies in 2015 from its fifth region list. He was the PAN's parliamentary coordinator in the Chamber of Deputies, sitting on the Political Coordination Board, and also served on the Oversight Commission for the Superior Auditor of the Federation.
