= Mario Delgado (politician) =

Mexican politician

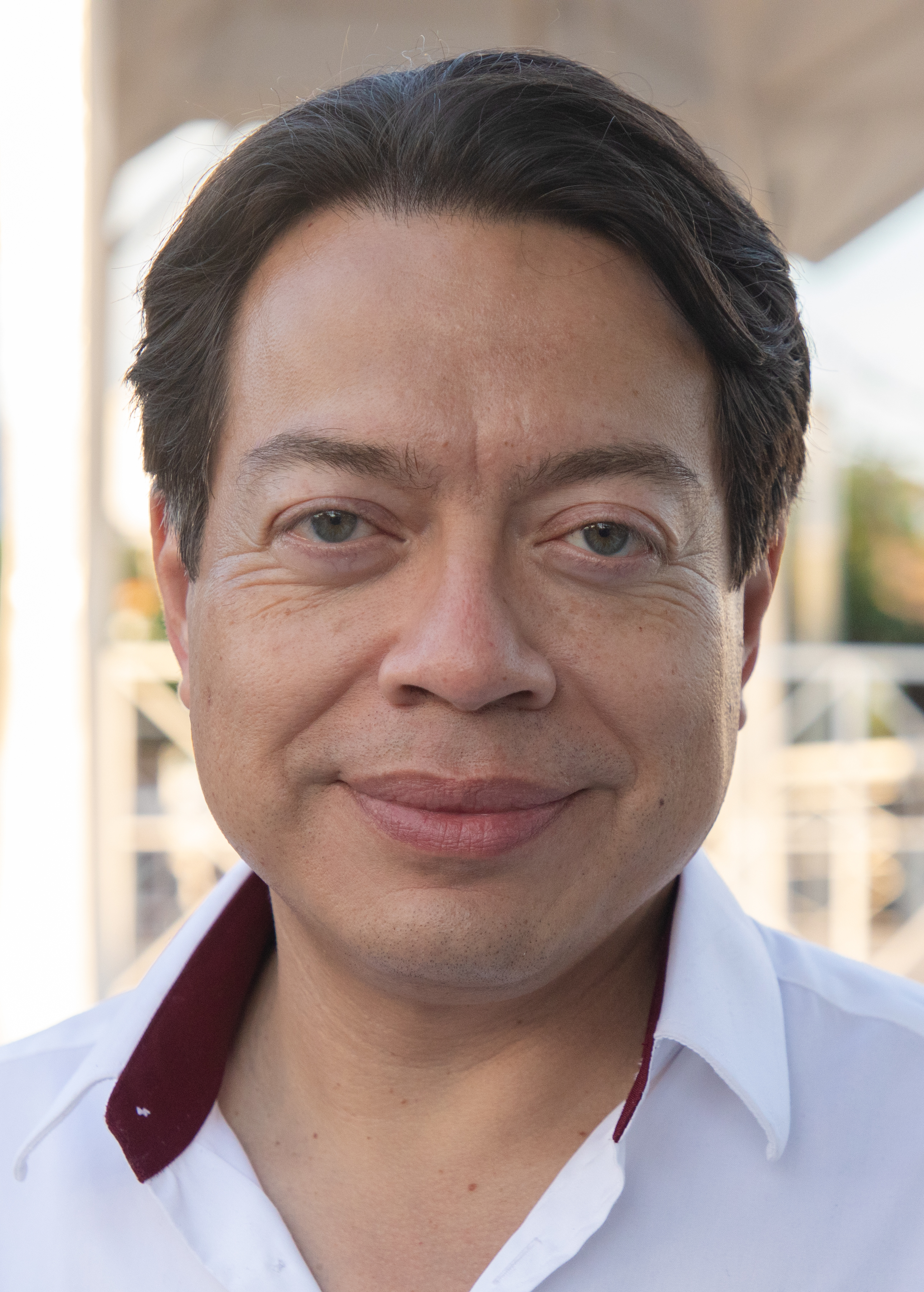
- Delgado in 2021

Secretary of Public Education
- Incumbent
- Assumed office 1 October 2024
- President: Claudia Sheinbaum
- Preceded by: Leticia Ramírez Amaya

President of the National Regeneration Movement
- In office 5 November 2020 – 30 September 2024
- Preceded by: Alfonso Ramírez Cuéllar
- Succeeded by: Luisa María Alcalde Luján

Deputy of the Congress of the Union for the 13th district of Mexico City
- In office 1 September 2018 – 5 November 2020
- Preceded by: Daniel Ordóñez Hernández
- Succeeded by: Óscar Gutiérrez Camacho

Senator of the Congress of the Union from Mexico City
- In office 1 September 2012 – 31 August 2018
- Preceded by: René Arce Islas
- Succeeded by: Citlalli Hernández

Personal details
- Born: Mario Martín Delgado Carrillo; 17 June 1972 (age 53) Colima, Colima, Mexico
- Party: National Regeneration Movement
- Other political affiliations: Party of the Democratic Revolution
- Education: Autonomous Technological Institute of Mexico (ITAM) (BA); University of Essex (MA)
- Occupation: Economist

Mario Martín Delgado Carrillo (born 17 June 1972) is a Mexican politician affiliated with the National Regeneration Movement (MORENA). Delgado Carrillo has served as the Secretary of Public Education in the cabinet of President Claudia Sheinbaum since 1 October 2024. From 5 November 2020 to 30 September 2024 he was the party's president.

Delgado Carrillo was born in the city of Colima in 1972. He served as a senator for Mexico City from 2012 to 2018 during the 62nd and 63rd sessions of Congress, elected on a Party of the Democratic Revolution (PRD) ticket. In the 2018 general election he was elected to the Chamber of Deputies as MORENA's candidate in Mexico City's 13th district. On 5 November 2020 he resigned his seat to become president of MORENA and was replaced by his substitute, Óscar Gutiérrez Camacho.

On 5 July 2024, president-elect Claudia Sheinbaum announced that Delgado Carrillo was to serve in her cabinet as Secretary of Public Education as of 1 October 2024.
