= La Casa de los Mañosos =

- Genre: Adult animation; Animated sitcom; Black comedy; Crossover; Parody; Reality; Satire; Surreal humor
- Based on: La casa de los famosos
- Presented by: La jefa; Changoleón
- Original language: Spanish
- No. of seasons: 1
- No. of episodes: 16

Production
- Camera setup: Multi-camera
- Running time: 8–18 minutes

Original release
- Network: YouTube
- Release: 27 July 2026 – present

La Casa de los Mañosos (Spanish for The House of the Devious; also called La Casa de los Mañosos México) is an artificial intelligence web series broadcast weekly on YouTube, premiering on 27 July 2026. The series is an adult animated political satire set in a reality show.

La Casa de los Mañosos parodies the reality show La casa de los famosos, in which a group of celebrities live together in a single house, completely isolated from the outside world. Residents nominate each other for elimination, and the home audience votes to evict or save their favorite contestants until a final winner remains to claim a cash prize. Instead, in La Casa de los Mañosos a group of characters parodying real-life Mexican politicians are grouped inside the Chapultepec Castle in hopes of winning lifelong political immunity from prosecution for any crime committed or yet to be committed.

Morena, the ruling party of Mexico, whose politicians are the main targets of parody in the series, filed a complaint with the National Electoral Institute (INE), but it was dismissed. Journalists were divided in determining whether the program falls within the bounds of freedom of expression, defamation, and copyright infringement.

== Format ==
The characters that entered the house on Day 1

La Casa de los Mañosos is a political satire reality show created with artificial intelligence. It centers around contests between Mexican politicians depicted as openly crooked. They are divided into two groups inside the Chapultepec Castle, Huachicoleros (fuel-smugglers) and Narcopolíticos (narco-politicians). They live in two rooms: Bienestar ('Well-being'), where the team sleeps in austerity, and Austeridad ('Austerity'), where the team sleeps in luxury. The show's contestants compete in various contests with the losing team facing the possibility of having members nominated for expulsion, which involves being arrested by the American Drug Enforcement Administration (DEA). Additionally, new politicians can enter the contest at any moment. The winner is expected to receive lifelong political immunity from prosecution for any crime committed or yet to be committed. (Note: Attributed to multiple sources, including the series' own premise and debut episode, El Sol de Mexico, Récord, TV Azteca, and Dossier Informativo.)

== Contestants ==
The characters featured in La Casa de los Mañosos are based on real-life politicians, mostly affiliated to the ruling party of Mexico, Morena.

Name	Based on	Political party	Team	Day entered	Day exited	Status
Nahle	Rocío Nahle	Morena	Huachicoleros	1	13	Evicted
El Cuauh	Cuauhtémoc Blanco	Morena	Narcopolíticos	1		
Adán	Adán Augusto López	Morena	Narcopolíticos	1		
Citlali	Citlalli Hernández	Morena	Narcopolíticos	1		
Andy	Andrés Manuel López Beltrán	Morena	Huachicoleros	1		
Salgado Macedonio	Félix Salgado Macedonio	Morena	Huachicoleros	1		
Layda	Layda Sansores	Morena	Narcopolíticos	1		
Abelina	Abelina López Rodríguez	Morena	Huachicoleros	1	4	Evicted
Andrea	Andrea Chávez	Morena	Narcopolíticos	1	6	Evicted
Rocha	Rubén Rocha Moya	Morena	Huachicoleros	1		
Marina	Marina del Pilar Ávila	Morena	Huachicoleros	1		
Arturito Cerovotos	Arturo Ávila	Morena	Narcopolíticos	1 (as a guest contestant)	9	Evicted
Samuel	Samuel García	Citizens' Movement	Huachicoleros	6 (as a guest contestant)		
Alito	Alito Moreno	Institutional Revolutionary Party	Unclear	10 (entered himself)		
Ernestina	Ernestina Godoy	Morena	Unclear	13 (as a guest contestant)		

== Episodes ==
No. overall	No. in season	Title	Original release date
1	1	"¡Bienvenidos a La Casa de los Mañosos! El reality donde el premio es un fuero y no culpan a Calderón (Note: English: Welcome to La Casa de los Mañosos! The reality show where the prize is immunity and they don't blame Calderón)"	27 July 2026
Eleven contestants and a guest enter the Chapultepec Castle. La jefa ('The female boss'), the voice-over host introduces the contestants and sets the rules, including not stealing, harassing other contestants, rationing food portions, refrain from blaming Calderón (Felipe Calderón) for any negative situation, and refrain from proselytizing. Changoleón (Gerardo Fernández Noroña) co-hosts the series. Panelists include Alito (Alito Moreno), el Presidente (Andrés Manuel López Obrador), la Presidenta (Claudia Sheinbaum), and Anaya (Ricardo Anaya). The contestants are divided into two groups, Huachicoleros and Narcopolíticos, and are presented with the room where they will be staying. At the end of the episode, Citlali sneaks into the kitchen and steals food from the refrigerator.
2	2	"100 maneras de CENSURAR (Note: English: 100 ways to CENSOR)"	3 August 2026
Dedication: The episode was dedicated to the seven journalists who had been murdered as of the time of the screening. The participants wake up accusing each other of stealing the food. During the dialogue, each character begins to reveal their personality. Not knowing for sure who stole the food, la jefa briefs them on the day's activity, Sín periodístas sí hay paraíso ('Without journalists, there is paradise'), in which they participate in 100 Morena members said, hosted by Marco Antonio (Marco Antonio Regil). In the show, 100 Morena members were previously asked their favorite methods to prevent a journalistic investigation from being published. The contestant who gives the most popular answer is granted immunity in the first elimination round and the chance to switch rooms for a night. El Cuauh gives the most popular answer: to order the journalist's disappearance.
3	3	"Los mañosos más odiados de México mostraron su lado más humilde como servidores públicos. (Note: English: Mexico's most hated crooks showed their most humble side as public servants.)"	10 August 2026
La jefa reprimands Rocha for threatening Marco Antonio off-camera to secure the victory, which did indeed earn him immunity and a stay in the Austeridad room. Before selecting Layda for the room swap, Rocha and the Team Huachicoleros talk about their most corrupt moments. In the subplot, Arturito ends up locked in the bathroom because he cannot reach the doorknob due to his height.
4	4	"Noche de EXPULSIÓN: se va el PRIMER MAÑOSO (Note: English: EVICTION NIGHT: The FIRST DEVIOUS is OUT)"	17 August 2026
Dedication: To Julio César Arredondo, a 21-year-old student assassinated in Culiacán, Sinaloa. Andrea wakes up the Narcopolíticos with her pre-campaign events, infuriating Citlali, and being reminded that such acts are prohibited. They also learn that Abelina clogged the toilet. La jefa informs the contestants that it is elimination night and that they must wear a costume designed by Aldo Rendón during the gala; each costume features elements that reflect the characteristics of each contestant. Yordi (Yordi Rosado) is invited to host the elimination night and tries unsuccessfully to explain the elimination rules. Due to gender equality quotas, a man and a woman would be nominated, these being Abelina and Andy. Unlike other nights, the contestant to be evicted was chosen by the production team: Andy. However, before Yordi could say his full name, he receives a message through his earpiece from el Presidente, who is also Andy's father, asking him to change the results so that Abelina is evicted.
5	5	"Nuestros mañosos se enfrentan al reto más difícil: cocinar con 100 pesos. (Note: English: Our crooks face their toughest challenge yet: cooking on a budget of 100 pesos.)"	24 August 2026
Dedication: To the Mexicans who lost their mobile phone line registration due to a law, comparing it to a police state situation. In the house, Andy practices his political speeches in front of his housemates. La jefa informs them on the day's activity, Como agua para gente color chocolate ('Like water for people with chocolate-colored skin'), in which participants must use Secretariat of Welfare cards loaded with 100 pesos to buy food for a family dinner at government-run stores. The contest is judged by Chef Benito (Benito Molina), who evaluates the dish's creativity rather than its flavor. Citlali is the head chef for Team Narcopolíticos and prepares a potpourri, while on Team Huachicoleros Andy self-selects as the leader, ordering 10 orders of tacos at 2,000 pesos per order. Chef Benito tries to give Team Narcopolíticos a low score, but after receiving threats, the score becomes a 10, while Team Huachicoleros receives a lower score. Citlali is granted immunity from the next eviction. Angry at Andy, his team bars him from entering the bedroom.
6	6	"Los mañosos hoy pondrán a prueba sus habilidades para darnos pan y circo. (Note: English: Today, the devious will put their skills to the test to give us bread and circuses.)"	31 August 2026
Dedication: To the more than 17,000 people that has disappeared since Claudia Sheinbaum took office, averaging 40 per day as of the time of the screening. Andy's dad informs him that he must remember the phrase "bread and circuses" for today's activity. The guest Ajoloñera Brugada (Clara Brugada) informs them that today's activity is to provide the people with food and entertainment at a circus to distract them from the ongoing cases of disappearances in the country. The judges are comedians Videgaray (Eduardo Videgaray) and José Ramón (José Ramón San Cristóbal). The teams receive 1,000,000,000 pesos each to prepare their shows. They are divided into two teams: one consisting of Andy, Adán, Rocha, and Andrea, who present Wicho Domínguez (Carlos Bonavides), and the other consisting of Layda, El Cuauh, Marina, and Salgado Macedonio, who present BTS and Merlín the Duck. The performers portraying BTS turn out not to be the real band; one of them is revealed to be influencer Juanpa Zurita in disguise. Following threats to the comedians, these and Ajoloñera name BTS as the winner, and the losing team votes to expel Andrea. At home, Citlali is resting when a helicopter arrives carrying the new resident, Samuel.
7	7	"ANDY y SAMUEL se retan a un FARMEO DE AURAS. (Note: English: ANDY and SAMUEL challenge each other to an AURA FARMING contest.)"	7 September 2026
Dedication: To the more than 18,000 children and teenagers recruited by organized crime. In the confessional, the housemates discuss Samuel's arrival, which has received mixed reactions, and is compared to Andy. For today's activity, Ricardo Peralta provides them with a substance that functions as a truth serum, mixing Ayahuasca and Ozempic, which causes the residents to open up to one another while losing weight. As the inhabitants open up, Peralta drinks high doses of the product. When it is Andy and Samuel's turn, Andy expresses annoyance at his presence in the house, stating that he should be the only nepo baby there. Andy challenges him to an aura battle, but ends up losing to Samuel, who asks him not to fight since they have both had difficult fathers. The two reconcile, although Samuel has other motives, and a very thin Peralta drinks one last dose and turns into dust.
8	8	"ESPECIAL del 15 de SEPTIEMBRE. (Note: English: 15 SEPTEMBER SPECIAL.)"	14 September 2026
Dedication: To the deceased Mexicans. The women are ovulating and shut themselves in a room. As it is 15 September (Mexican Independence Day), today's activity involves participants showing empathy toward three Mexicans: a father who lost his son due to a lack of cancer medication, the brother of an environmentalist who was disappeared while defending the Maya Forest, and a searching mother who has been looking for missing persons for 10 years. The residents must find a way to make their day a good one. Among the ideas they come up with are having Salt Bae cook dinner for them, and baking cookies decorated with the faces of missing people. Salgado performs a striptease, which causes la jefa to automatically nominate him for expulsion. Andy, who had previously ordered El Sol's (Luis Miguel) kidnapping, has him perform tied to a chair and with a gag in front of the guests. None of the actions please the guests. Furious, Andy reproaches them for being ungrateful for their gestures. The searching mother scolds them, telling them that they are not demanding justice simply for the sake of it, and that they are doing the work that politicians should be doing. Both teams lose, and Arturito upsets la jefa, who is also ovulating, so nominates him for elimination. Later, both teams throw a party.
9	9	"Entra un NUEVO MAÑOSO a la casa. (Note: English: A NEW DEVIOUS enters the house.)"	21 September 2026
Dedication: To the medical staff for performing activities despite the shortcomings in the healthcare sector, and to the athletes for their performance despite the corruption at CONADE. Arturito is eliminated after receiving zero votes in the poll. For today's challenge, Ana Gaby (Ana Gabriela Guevara) is visiting the house for the activity Ladrón que roba a ladrón ('Thief Steals from a Thief'). The goal is to catch Ana Gaby, a runner, but has also injected herself with a substance that gives her super speed. Teams are allowed for this challenge, and the winner or winners will receive the 544,000,000 pesos that Ana Gaby stole from CONADE. Samuel thaws Yuawi (Yuawi López), a 49-year-old man with a childlike appearance who is defrosted during election season. Yuawi catches Ana Gaby, and everyone wins the prize. In the subplot, Rendón provides the participants with sports equipment, but makes a comment that offends Layda, who hits him. As punishment, she demands that he be sent to a Mexican Social Security Institute hospital so he can suffer, and there he receives substandard care due to a lack of supplies. At the end of the episode, Alito, who found the drugs that Ana Gaby disposed of, injects himself with them, revisiting a scene in which he mentions that he deserves to be inside the house to receive immunity. Alito then heads to the castle.
10	10	"LCDLM trae a la pantalla eso que todos estábamos esperando: Una put1za entre gandallas. (Note: English: LCDLM brings to the screen what we've all been waiting for: a bad4ss fight between unscrupulous.)"	28 September 2026
Dedication: To the audience. The participants reproach Alito for entering the castle without authorization. Later, Layda accuses Alito of stealing her Botox, which he denies and reminds her that many Morena members and some contestants are former Institutional Revolutionary Party (PRI) militants, the party of which he is president. Andy gets upset learning it and Adán tries to confort him in the subplot. To determine whether Alito stays or not, la jefa organizes a lucha libre match between him and Layda, with el Presidente, la Presidenta, and Ke Monito in attendance as panelists, and Shocker as referee. Arturito, who managed to escape from prison because of his size, shows up to help Layda during the fight. Seeing this, Ke Monito helps Alito fight Arturito. The audience, which was divided into the privileged and the common people, begins to fight in the stands. Layda falls out of the ring into the brawling crowd, and Alito leaps from the third rope, applying a submission hold on Layda to win the match. As a consequence, former PRI members find the PRI logo tattooed on their arm, including el Presidente's. Changoleón, upset by Alito's victory, threatens him at gun point, but then hands it to his assistant, who fires but misses. Yuawi appears running at super speed and stops the bullet with his body as it was heading toward Samuel. Meanwhile at home, Adán gives Andy a box of mementos filled with photos and documents from former PRI members. When he sees his father's old PRI ID badge, a childhood memory comes flooding back. In it, he builds a mockup refinery out of Legos to help Pemex, but his father destroys it and tells him, laughing, that he has to take advantage out of it instead. Back to the present day, Andy enrages and the PRI logo appears on his arm.
11	11	"Los MAÑOSOS se ATERRORIZARON en METRO PANTITLÁN. (Note: English: The DEVIOUS get SCARED at PANTITLÁN METRO STATION.)"	5 October 2026
Dedication: To Edith Nevarez González, deputy principal of General Secondary School No. 13 in Torreón, Coahuila, killed during an attack on the school. For the day's activity, guest Chumel (Chumel Torres) takes the participants to the Mexico City Metro. At Pantitlán metro station, he informs them that they have six hours to get to the Jamaica metro station (found in the same line) and stop the humorist Vampipe from posting memes and parodies of the contestants and la Presidenta online. Unaccustomed to using public transportation, the participants get lost in the stations. They also have to deal with everyday life and incidents that occur in the system, including street vendors, flooding, and sexual harassment. After six hours, the contestants fail, and Vampipe posts the memes online. In the subplot, Andy remains disappointed by Morena's PRI past and wanders through the castle. In one room, he finds a mirror, and when he looks at his reflection, he sees himself wearing the presidential sash, but with Carlos Salinas de Gortari (depicted as Lord Voldemort) stands behind him.
12	12	"Descubre cuál de los mañosos es EL RUFIÁN MÁS DÉBIL. (Note: English: Find out which of the tricksters is THE WEAKEST RUFFIAN.)"	19 October 2026
Dedication: To Jesús Alvarado Carrera and Rosalba Sánchez, elote sellers who were killed. The participating governors debate which state is the best, but when Rocha insults Layda's state, she injects Botox into his lips, leaving him unable to speak. Alito gifts Andy with a presidential sash and some PRIteina ("PRItein") powder, addressing him by his full name rather than his hypocorism, which pleases Andy. Today's guest is Lolita (Lolita Cortés), who is hosting El rufián más débil (The Weakest Ruffian), a parody of Weakest Link. Contestants must answer questions about daily life in Mexico to save their bankroll of 10,000,000 pesos. Andy inhales the Pritein and reveals that Samuel is being helped by his wife, Marianis (Mariana Rodríguez) through an earpiece, so he is nominated for elimination. The show is interrupted by Salgado Macedonio, who, upon learning that Lolita, a judge on the reality musical La Academia, is hosting, sings a song for her. Lolita is critical of the act and makes all the contestants eligible for elimination as none was able to answer the questions correctly.
13	13	"Espiritismo, disfraces horribles, exorcismos. Este ESPECIAL DE JUAGOLIN viene con TODO. (Note: English: Spiritualism, terrifying costumes, exorcisms. This "JUAGOLIN" SPECIAL has it ALL.)"	26 October 2026
Dedication: To those who suffer injustices in the country, where 90% of crimes go unpunished. In a Halloween special, Adela (Adela Micha) hosts the episode and introduces the participants in their Halloween costumes. Rocío is evicted, but before she is arrested, she summons crabs that devour her. For the day's event, the participants must find criminal investigation files bearing their names, but first they must confront their fears. Andy becomes possessed by the spirits of deceased PRI presidents, prompting Layda, Citlali and Marina to perform an exorcism. None of the participants find their folders, but la jefa reminds them that the attorney general, Ernestina, would never have presented them anyway, introducing her as the new contestant.
14	14	"ESPECIAL DE DIA DE MUERTOS (o como diría Ernestina, "Día Cualquiera") (Note: English: DAY OF THE DEAD SPECIAL (or, as Ernestina would say, "Just Another Day"))"	2 November 2026
Dedication: To Mexicans who died as a result of government negligence. In a Day of the Dead special, Eva María (Eva María Beristain) takes the contestants to the Panteón de Dolores. There, she explains the cemetery's history and Day of the Dead traditions. La jefa tells the contestants that whoever manages to connect with the tradition will receive immunity until the final. However, the contestants remain apathetic, causing the food and flowers to wither as they pass. The spirit of Carlos Manzo appears and tells them the truth about how corrupt they are. The contestants decide to destroy the ofrendas placed on the tombstones, prompting cemetery visitors to chase them away. In the subplot, Marianis tells Samuel that his party's popularity is declining because of water supply problems in Guadalajara. She asks him to place an ofrenda for Yuawi to bring his spirit back from the dead, but Yuawi flees to Xochimilco after seeing how poorly it was made. There, a group of ghost busters hired by Samuel captures him.
15	15	"La Claudiseñal invoca a los mañosos para proteger Palacio Nacional de manifestantes. (Note: English: The Claudisign calls on the devious to protect the National Palace from protesters.)"	9 November 2026
Dedication: To the citizens who have been repressed during demonstrations and to political prisoners. La Presidenta sends a distress signal to the participants because doctors are set to protest in front of her residence, the National Palace, over the shortage of medical supplies and medications and low wages. The contestants prepare by acting as riot police. Citlali contacts the black bloc to have them infiltrate the protests. The contestants and the police ruthlessly attack the protesters, arresting several doctors. In the subplot, while inside a mental simulation, Andy and Alito face off against Adán and Rocha in various duels. In one of them, Rocha tries to poison Andy's drink, but Andy notices it and makes Rocha drink it instead, causing his death. Adán and Alito wake up and flee, and when la jefa realizes Rocha is dead, she asks what happened.
16	16	"Ha ocurrido un crimen en la Casa… ¿Quién es el culpable? (Note: English: A crime has been committed at the House... Who is to blame?)"	17 November 2026
Dedication: To those who have been displaced by organized crime. La jefa questions the residents about what happened to Rocha, and they recount what they know. After getting little information from everybody, Andy leaves the confessional nervously and runs into Rocha, who tells him that he killed him in a simulation. In the subplot, Marina steals Moctezuma II's chīmalli and sends it to Donald Trump, hoping to get her visa back; Trump includes it with gifts from other politicians who also had their visas revoked. Changoleón invites Lupita (Guadalupe Taddei) to the castle for a meal, while Changoleón’s assistant watches from a distance, filled with jealousy.

== TV Azteca broadcast ==
La Casa de los Mañosos was added to TV Azteca programming, on 23 August 2026, on the broadcast television channels Azteca Uno and ADN Noticias. Because of it, journalists, including Álvaro Cueva and Álvaro Delgado, claimed that La Casa de los Mañosos was created by Ricardo Salinas Pliego, owner of TV Azteca, who has been critical of politicians associated with the Fourth Transformation. TV Azteca distanced itself from the production of La Casa de los Mañosos and announced legal action against anyone who associated the company with the series' production.

== Reception ==
=== Critical response ===
Cueva was critical of La Casa de los Mañosos, calling it "pure shit". He said he is "afraid" that the authorities are not censoring the series for fear of ridicule; that the producers of La casa de los famosos are not filing copyright complaints, implying that they might be involved in La casa de los mañosos; that TV Azteca aired it on free-to-air television against its ethics code; and that other journalists were not complaining about "such a gross violation of the most basic human rights". He added that the web series violates Mexican law because it uses people's voices and likeness and makes them say they are committing crimes.

Similarly, Delgado questioned why La casa de los famosos was not filing copyright complaints. He compared La Casa de los Mañosos with other political satires during the 2000s, including Hechos de Peluche, broadcast by TV Azteca, and El Privilegio de Mandar, broadcast by Televisa, which in his view caricatured López Obrador ahead of the 2006 presidential elections. Rosa María Noguerón, producer of La casa de los famosos, denied that La Casa de los Mañosos infringed on the series' copyright, arguing that, as a parody, it was protected by freedom of expression. She also noted that the parody reflects La casa de los famosos' status as a television benchmark.

Sergio López Ayllón says that freedom of expression has limits, but La Casa de los Mañosos does not cross them, although he felt that a broadcast on a news channel like ADN Noticias was questionable. He also added that linking recognizable faces to criminal charges, as well as the sexualization of women, is on the edge of legality but "undermines editorial credibility". For Marco A. Zavala Arredondo, the series exemplifies political satire regardless of its form, since it "articulates opinions about civil servants whose performance is open to commentary, analysis, and even ridicule".

=== Politicians response ===
On 26 August 2026, Morena filed a complaint with the National Electoral Institute (INE), following TV Azteca's broadcast. In it, the party noted that the program links real people to crimes such as drug trafficking and fuel smuggling, and called for the suspension of broadcasts and advertising. The Inter-American Press Association expressed concern that attempts were being made to use electoral mechanisms ahead of the 2027 elections as a pretext to restrict satire and freedom of the press, and described criticism of those in power as "an essential component of a democratic society".

The INE dismissed the complaint because it could not find any statements in the program that directly defamed the party, and therefore it did not constitute electoral slander against the political organization. Writing about the event, scholar Luis Ángel Hurtado Razo believes that, although anonymity can sometimes be used maliciously, requiring online critics to disclose private data violates their privacy and can lead to politicians targeting any citizen or journalist they find inconvenient.
