= Carlos Alberto Torres (disambiguation) =

Carlos Alberto Torres (1944–2016) was a Brazilian footballer and manager.

Carlos Alberto Torres may refer to:

- Carlos Alberto Torres (Puerto Rican nationalist) (born 1952), Puerto Rican nationalist
- Carlos Alberto Torres (sociologist) (born 1950), Argentine professor of social science
- Carlos Alberto Torres Caro (born 1963), Peruvuian lawyer
- Carlos Alberto Torres Torres (born 1975), Mexican politician

== See also ==
- Carlos Torres (disambiguation)
