= Carlos Torres =

Carlos Torres may refer to:

== Politics ==
- Carlos Torres Hevia (1894–1990), Chilean politician
- Carlos Torres Piña (born 1979), Mexican politician
- Carlos Torres y Torres Lara (1942–2000), Peruvian lawyer and politician
- Carlos Alberto Torres Torres (born 1975), Mexican politician
- Carlos J. Torres Torres (born 1967), Puerto Rican senator

== Sports ==
=== Association football (soccer) ===
- Carlos Torres (Portuguese footballer) (1908–?), Portuguese footballer
- Carlos Alberto Torres (1944–2016), Brazilian soccer captain and coach
- Carlos Torres (Ecuadorian footballer) (born 1951)
- Carlos Torres (Peruvian footballer) (born 1966)
- Carlos Alexandre Torres (born 1966), Brazilian footballer
- Carlos Torres (footballer, born 1968), Paraguayan footballer
- Carlos Torres (footballer, born 2002), Colombian footballer
- Carlos Torres (referee) (born 1970), Paraguayan football (soccer) referee

=== Other sports ===
- Carlos Torres (umpire) (born 1978), Venezuelan baseball umpire
- Carlos Torres (pitcher) (born 1982), American baseball player
- Carlos Torres (cyclist), Venezuelan road cyclist

== Others ==
- Carlos Torres (actor) (born 1988), Colombian actor
- Carlos Torres (astronomer) (1929–2011), Chilean astronomer at the Cerro El Roble Astronomical Station
- Carlos Alberto Torres (Puerto Rican nationalist) (born 1952), Puerto Rican nationalist
- Carlos Alberto Torres (sociologist) (born 1950), Argentinian-American professor of education at UCLA
- Carlos Torres Vila (banker) (born 1966), Spanish banker
- Carlos Torres Vila (musician) (1946–2010), Argentinian musician
