= Gustavo Sánchez =

Gustavo Sánchez may refer to:

- Gustavo Sánchez (artistic swimmer) (born 2000), Colombian artistic swimmer
- Gustavo Sánchez (footballer) (born 2000), Mexican footballer
- Gustavo Sánchez Martínez (born 1994), Mexican Paralympic swimmer
- Gustavo Sánchez Parra (born 1966), Mexican actor
- Gustavo Sánchez Vásquez (1963–2026), Mexican politician
