= List of municipal presidents of Mexicali =

The following is a list of municipal presidents of the municipality of Mexicali in the Mexican state of Baja California. The municipality includes the city of Mexicali.

== List of officials ==
- Rodolfo Escamilla Soto, 1953-1956
- Raúl Tiznado Aguilar, 1956-1959
- Joaquín Ramírez Arballo, 1959-1960
- Federico Martínez Manautou, 1960-1962
- Carlos Rubio Parra, 1962-1965
- José María Rodríguez Mérida, 1965-1968
- Francisco Gallego Monge, 1968-1969
- Eduardo Martínez Palomera, 1970–1971, 1980-1983
- Roberto Mazón Noriega, 1971-1974
- Armando Gallego Moreno, 1974-1977
- Francisco Santana Peralta, 1977–1980, 1983-1986
- Guillermo Aldrete Hass, 1986-1989
- Milton Castellanos Gout, 1989-1992
- Francisco José Pérez Tejada, 1992-1995
- Eugenio Elorduy Walther, 1995-1998
- Víctor Hermosillo Celada, 1998-2001
- Jaime Rafael Díaz Ochoa, 2001–2004, 2013-2016
- Samuel Ramos Flores, 2004-2007
- Rodolfo Valdez Gutierrez, 2007-2010
- Francisco José Pérez Tejada Padilla, 2011-2013
- Gustavo Sánchez Vásquez (PAN), 2016–2019
- Marina del Pilar Ávila Olmeda (MORENA), 2019-2021
- Guadalupe Mora (MORENA), Interim beginning 6 March 2021

== See also ==
- Baja California state election, 2019
- Mexicali history
