= Revocation of visas for Mexican politicians in the second Trump administration =

During the second presidency of Donald Trump, which began in 2025, the United States government has revoked travel visas for Mexican politicians as part of its investigations into alleged crimes committed within the U.S., or alleged ties to criminal organizations in Mexico. As of August 2026, at least 50 politicians have had their visas revoked, although both governments have not disclosed their names.

Several politicians have openly stated that their visas were revoked, indicating that this was due to minor offenses committed in previous years. Others have indicated unclear reasons for the revocations. Others, however, have accused the U.S. government of political manipulation and interference in Mexican politics, claiming that the revocations are being used as a way to influence the 2027 local and legislative elections.

The federal government of Mexico has rejected investigating the allegations without evidence, and has pushed for the possibility of canceling elections allegedly influenced by foreign actors.

== Confirmed politicians ==
=== Marina del Pilar Ávila ===
In May 2025, Marina del Pilar Ávila Olmeda, the governor of Baja California, a border state, became the first sitting Mexican governor to have the visa revoked. She and her then-husband Carlos Alberto Torres Torres had their visas revoked after allegations of money-laundering investigations. Ávila's attorney attributed it to her criticism of the U.S. government.

In 2026, multiple audio recordings of meetings she had with people alleged law enforcement agents, including at least one FBI agent, began to surface. In them the agents brief her and give her ultimatums to provide relevant information under a proffer agreement. In them, Ávila said that she was willing to "talk about everything" and to disclose what she had heard at security meetings.

Ávila initially acknowledged the authenticity of the audio recordings, saying that she was actively seeking to regain her visa. When more audio recordings were leaked, she said they had been manipulated, edited, and taken out of context.

Omar García Harfuch, Secretary of Security and Citizen Protection, indicated that in the audios Ávila did not disclose confidential information or that she had committed a crime.

=== Héctor Astudillo Flores ===
Héctor Astudillo Flores, former governor of Guerrero, confirmed that his visa was revoked on 31 July 2025. He said that he was not given a clear reason for the revocation despite asking for one and described the decision as a "dirty war" against him.

=== Luis Samuel Guerrero Delgado ===
Luis Samuel Guerrero Delgado, official with the Baja California State Council for Accident Prevention, and husband of Norma Alicia Bustamante Martínez, mayor of Mexicali, had his visa revoked in August 2025 while trying to cross to Calexico, California.

=== Juan Francisco Gim ===
In August 2025, Juan Francisco Gim, mayor of Nogales, Sonora, said that his visa was revoked, although he stated that he "was not accused of any wrongdoing whatsoever".

=== José Luis Dagnino ===
José Luis Dagnino, mayor of San Felipe, Baja California, confirmed in December 2025, the revocation of his visa without indication of the reason.

=== Andrés Manuel López Beltrán ===
Andrés Manuel López Beltrán, son of the former president of Mexico, Andrés Manuel López Obrador, and former secretary of organization of the political party Morena, published a letter addressed to Donald Trump in which he criticized Marco Rubio and Christopher Landau the US Secretary of State and Deputy Secretary of State, respectively. In it, López Beltrán accused them of ordering the visa revocation and described the decision as politically motivated, "Hitlerian", "arrogant", and a "crude and perverse act", saying that Mexican politicians were being labeled as "communists", "threats to U.S. security" and "narco-terrorists". López Beltrán said that evidence of wrongdoings was not provided, and asked Trump to confirm whether he was aware of the decision. He added that, if Trump was unaware of it, he should order the dismissal of both officials.

President Claudia Sheinbaum described the revocation as "interference in Mexican politics" and the country's sovereignty. Morena politicians supported López Beltrán, arguing that the action constituted political interference. They issued a statement asserting that the "revocation of visas for politically-exposed persons does not constitute proof that any crime or irregularity has been committed", and describing the decision as "a political message intended to intimidate those who firmly defend Mexico's sovereignty".

After publishing the letter, López Beltrán, who had announced his plans to seek Morena's nomination to compete for Tabasco's 6th district in the 2027 election, posted a video calling on Mexicans to organize in the face of the "assault on national sovereignty by foreign governments".

The Embassy of the United States reused a video of Rubio when asked about the revocation of visas, in which he answered that "no one is entitled" to one, adding that people that visit the U.S. "and undertake activities against the national interests of the United States", will have the visa revoked. Landau posted on X "Are you enjoying the show? Refill your popcorn. You'll love the next part".
