= Jaime Rafael Díaz Ochoa =

Mexican politician

- Born: 14 August 1956 (age 69); Mexicali, Baja California, Mexico
- Occupation: Politician
- Political party: PAN
- Website: http://www.jaimerafaeldiazochoa.com/

Jaime Rafael Díaz Ochoa (born 14 August 1956) is a Mexican politician affiliated with the PAN. As of 2013 he served as Senator of the LX and LXI Legislatures of the Mexican Congress representing Baja California.

On 1 December 2013 Díaz took office as new Municipal President of Mexicali.

== See also ==
- List of presidents of Mexicali Municipality
