= Carlos Torres (footballer, born 2002) =

Colombian footballer (born 2002)

Personal information
- Full name: Carlos Eduardo Torres Góngora
- Date of birth: 20 October 2002 (age 24)
- Place of birth: Ricaurte, Nariño, Colombia
- Height: 1.74 m (5 ft 9 in)
- Position: Forward

Team information
- Current team: Capital

Youth career
- 2017–2020: Deportes Tolima
- 2021: Šibenik

Senior career*
Years	Team	Apps	(Gls)
2021–2025	Šibenik	47	(8)
2022–2023	→ Dugopolje (loan)	31	(1)
2025–2026	Envigado	9	(2)
2026–	Capital	0	(0)

International career
2020	Colombia U20		
- * Club domestic league appearances and goals as of 19 March 2026

Carlos Eduardo Torres Góngora (born 20 October 2002) is a Colombian footballer who currently plays as a forward for Brazilian club Capital.

== Early life ==
Torres was born in Ricaurte in the Nariño Department of Colombia, and is one of four brothers.

== Club career ==
=== Deportes Tolima ===
In 2017, Torres moved to Ibagué, signing with Deportes Tolima on a three-year contract. Set to sign a contract renewal with the club, Torres returned late from a holiday in Tumaco after his aunt died; due to this he was sent to the under-20 squad and the club failed to sign off the appropriate documentation to authorise his contract extension.

=== HNK Šibenik ===
Following the contract dispute, Torres took an opportunity to move to Croatia in February 2021, signing with HNL side Šibenik on a two-and-a-half-year deal. He was registered to play for Šibenik the following month. Deportes Tolima, unhappy that he had left on a free transfer, sued both Torres and Šibenik for €2 million for "unjustified breach of contract", and the case reached the international governing body of football, FIFA. After some deliberation, FIFA sided with Torres and Šibenik, rejecting Deportes Tolima's request, informing the Colombian club that they would have to pay for the costs of the process of the transfer.

In his first season at the club, Torres featured for both the youth team and the senior squad, making a total of three HNL appearances. Eight league appearances followed the next year, before Torres was loaned to Prva NL side Dugopolje for the 2022–23 season. On his return to Šibenik, he scored his first goal for the club in a 2–2 pre-season friendly draw with Posušje on 22 July 2023. After a strong start to the 2023–24 season, he extended his contract with the club in February 2024 - a deal lasting until summer 2025.

=== Envigado ===
Having left Šibenik in early 2025, Torres returned to Colombia, signing with Envigado in April 2025.

== International career ==
Torres was called up to the Colombia under-20 squad for three micro-cycles in 2020.

== Career statistics ==
=== Club ===
As of 28 April 2025.

Appearances and goals by club, season and competition
Club	Season	League			Cup		Other		Total	
Club	Season	Division	Apps	Goals	Apps	Goals	Apps	Goals	Apps	Goals
Šibenik	2020–21	HNL	3	0	0	0	0	0	3	0
Šibenik	2021–22	HNL	8	0	1 (Note: Appearances in the Croatian Football Cup)	0	0	0	9	0
Šibenik	2022–23	HNL	0	0	0	0	0	0	0	0
Šibenik	2023–24	Prva NL	29	8	1	0	0	0	30	8
Šibenik	2024–25	HNL	7	0	1	0	0	0	8	0
Šibenik	Total		47	8	3	0	0	0	50	8
Dugopolje (loan)	2022–23	Prva NL	31	1	0	0	0	0	31	1
Envigado	2025	Categoría Primera A	4	1	0	0	0	0	4	1
Career total			82	10	3	0	0	0	85	10
