= Plasan SandCat =

Armored vehicle

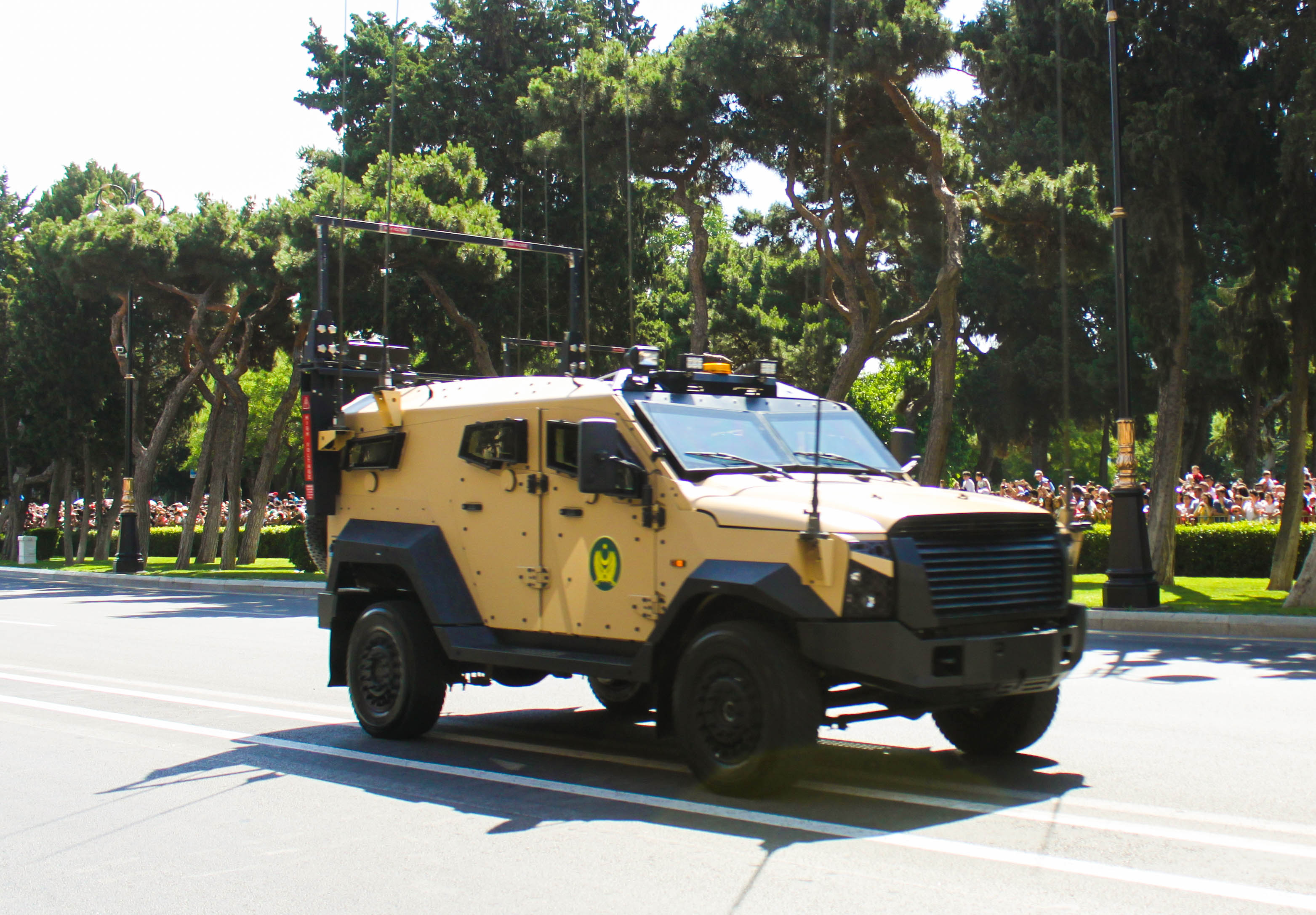
- Plasan SandCat at a military parade in Baku.
- Type: Light armoured vehicle
- Place of origin: Israel

Service history
- Used by: See Operators
- Wars: Mexican drug war Second Nagorno-Karabakh war

Production history
- Designer: Nir Kahn
- Designed: 2004
- Manufacturer: Plasan / Oshkosh Corporation / IBN Industrias Militares/IBN Military Industries
- Produced: 2004-present
- No. built: around 700

Specifications
- Length: 5.94 m (4th Generation M-LPV)
- Width: 2.315 m (91.1 in)(4th Generation M-LPV)
- Height: 2.54 m (4th Generation M-LPV)
- Crew: up to 10 (variant dependent)
- Armor: steel/ceramic/Kevlar; protection level to suit requirement
- Main armament: Remote weapon station (optional)
- Engine: 6.7 L Power Stroke diesel V8 (6.4 L in early variants)
- Payload capacity: up to 2,109 kg (generation and variant dependent)
- Transmission: Ford Torqshift six-speed automatic (five-speed in some early models)
- Suspension: coil springs and shock-absorbers at the front and leaf springs and shock-absorbers at the rear. Uprated as required (second generation had a Plasan-designed coil spring and trailing arm rear suspension)
- Ground clearance: 280 mm (4th generation M-LPV)
- Fuel capacity: 150 litres (4th generation)
- Operational range: 500-550 km (3rd and 4th generation)
- Maximum speed: 110 km/h (4th generation)

The SandCat (Hebrew: פלסן קרקל) is a composite armored vehicle designed by the then Plasan Sasa (now Plasan) of Israel. The SandCat was shown publicly for the first time at AUSA during October 2005. The latest models were shown for the first time at Eurosatory 2018. The SandCat is based on a commercial Ford F-Series chassis. Approximately 700 SandCats have been produced since 2004 and, while Plasan has never released complete details, these are known to be in service with at least 16 users across five continents, and in a wide variety of roles that range from police/internal security to combat/patrol.

== Development ==
The SandCat was designed from 2004 and for a variety of applications. It was seen as a potential replacement for the AIL Storm jeeps of the Israel Defense Forces (IDF), and for wider use as protected light vehicle capable of performing roles on deployed operations that until the deployments to Iraq and Afghanistan had been performed by softskin light utility types. Plasan has also stated the design was intended to demonstrate to partner-customer OEMs that the company could take any automotive platform and design an armoured hull for it.

The original SandCat was designed around an approximate 4,000 kg gross vehicle weight (GVW) and four-man crew, although following feedback from early evaluations this was revised to around 5,000 kg and four- to five-man crew. The SandCat's then unusual and distinct trapezoidal side windows were optimised to reduce the mass of the heavy armoured glass, while maximising useful viewing angles. Now widely adopted, these were an early and distinct design feature of the SandCat, as was a feline theme in the design aesthetics.

The SandCat was originally known as Caracal, but by Eurosatory 2006 the name SandCat had been adopted so as not to encourage confusion between the Plasan product and the version of IVECO's LMV being offered to the German Bundeswehr as Caracal by the now Rheinmetall Vehicle Systems Division.

Most SandCats are fully enclosed, although some first- and second-generation models were produced with a small open-topped rear cargo space.

== Generations ==
There have been four generations of SandCat.

=== First generation ===
The first-generation were mainly prototypes, although a small quantity were supplied to Israeli security forces. Sweden received a small quantity during 2008 in an eight-seat station wagon configuration for a Police/SWAT-type role. Prototypes and Israeli deliveries were in the original design configuration which featured an open rear stowage area. To differentiate between the original configuration, the longer bodied station wagon. configuration was initially known as the SandCat Plus. With the exception of the Swedish SandCats which are based on a Ford F450 chassis, all other developmental first generation SandCats were based on a Ford F350 chassis, this shortened from the standard 3.581 m wheelbase to a 2.946 m wheelbase. The original Caracal/SandCat prototype had a wheelbase shortened to 2.845 m. Prototypes were shortened by Manning Equipment of Louisville, Kentucky, United States.

=== Second generation ===
The second-generation SandCat was introduced in 2008, and following an update of the commercial product by Ford. More than 300 second-generation SandCats were produced. At this point Plasan did not desire to bulk-manufacture so Oshkosh Defense was licensed to market the SandCat. Second-generation SandCats for the Israeli Border Police were based on a Ford F350 chassis (shortened from a 3.581 m to a 2.946 m wheelbase), All other second-generation and all subsequent generations of SandCat are based on a Ford F550 chassis. Second-generation F550-based SandCats have a 2.946 m wheelbase, and with an overall length of 5 m for both the Utility (five-seat) and Transport (eight-seat) configurations. Utility has the open rear cargo area, Transport is the station wagon configuration. GVW for both configurations is up to 8,845 kg, with a payload allowance of up to 2,109 kg depending on configuration and protection levels.

In terms of styling the second-generation SandCat is the most varied and a variety of front ends, wings, windows and body configurations can be seen. While retaining the Ford bonnet, Plasan designed a new feline-inspired grille and lights that could accept either the Oshkosh badge, a generic SandCat badge, or for the local Israeli market where the Ford distributor sold the vehicle, a Ford badge. For the Mexican market Oshkosh retained the Ford grille and headlights for their version of the Transport configuration known as Tactical Protector Vehicle (TPV). The 249 Mexican SandCats were delivered during 2011/2012 and all were in Transport configuration. These were manufactured locally Blindajes Epal, the former local partner of Oshkosh/Plasan. There is also a local product known as the SandCat MX, but this is not a Plasan or Oshkosh product. Additionally, the Ford F550-based DN-XI which is similar in appearance to the Plasan SandCat (and is often confused with it) is a vehicle built independently by the Mexican Army and it is not related to the Plasan or Oshkosh products in any way. Following an agreement signed in 2016, Plasan's current local partner for the SandCat is IBN Industrias Militares/IBN Military Industries. The SandCat when marketed to Mexico by Plasan is known as the Stormer, the SandCat trademark having been registered elsewhere. Romania's second-generation SandCat's are used by the Gendarmerie and are a unique blast-protected model with a distinctly raised profile.

=== Third generation ===
The third-generation SandCat was introduced in 2011 following an update of the commercial product by Ford. Plasan marketed the third generation heavily as the SandCat Stormer to help differentiate it from earlier models. Users of third generation SandCats include Azerbaijan, Colombia, Israel, Kazakhstan, Poland, and Ukraine. Colombia placed an order with Oshkosh Defense in December 2012 for 14 SandCats, and it was around this time that Oshkosh's involvement with the product ceased. South Korea received its first SandCats in 2013, these fitted with RAFAEL Spike non line-of sight (NLOS)-guided missiles. In 2015 a contract to provide the Polish Military Police with 14 SandCats under the local name of the Szop (Racoon) was awarded. SandCats used by Azerbaijan and Kazakhstan were first seen during June 2015. The first Ukrainian SandCat was seen in March 2017.

Third-generation SandCats were available with a 2.946 m wheelbase and 5 m overall length or a 3.429 m wheelbase and 5.5 m overall length, although no 2.946 m wheelbase models were ordered. GVW of third-generation SandCats was up to 8845 kg, with payload allowance dependent on configuration and protection levels, but up to 2000 kg. Plasan initially focused the third-generation SandCat towards Police and SWAT-type roles so less-threatening styling was deliberately adopted. Design revisions included the swapping out of angular wheel arches with rounded plastic ones similar to those on earlier Swedish and Israeli Police SandCats. The grille and lights were carried over from the second-generation, these modified slightly to adapt to the new Ford bonnet. The third generation SandCat received a facelift in 2014 when a potential military customer requested a harder look. Key facelift features were a new armoured grille and a squarer third side glass in place of the more triangular original design. There were also cosmetic changes to the wings and side steps, the result of which created a more slab-sided look with less shape and tapering to the rear flanks. The softer original Stormer look remained available. The facelifted SandCat evolved into a family of Vehicles with single-cab, double-cab, and other variants tailored to particular missions or payloads. An example of this tailoring would be the vehicles supplied to South Korea.

==== Fourth generation ====
Fourth-generation models were shown for the first time in June 2018 and are described by the manufacturer as having a more flexible and modular architecture. Fourth generation SandCats are available in three baseline configurations; troop carrier, utility and a single cab version. The Troop Carrier which seats up to 10 is fully enclosed. The Utility has a fully armoured crew-type cab that seats up to five, while the Single Cab option seats up to three. In both instances, The rear chassis of the utility and single cab variants is available for a variety of payload options. In terms of styling, for recognition, for the first time there are no visible Ford parts on the fourth generation vehicle's exterior, the bonnet now a Plasan design. The new front has been designed to more easily allow for localisation or alternative identities. The default is a new interpretation of the feline SandCat grille first introduced on the second-generation model. A new window design has allowed for greater commonality across variants, there now being four unique glass shapes as opposed to eight on third-generation SandCats. The previous window designs remain available on request.

== Technical description ==
The SandCat is based on a well-proven Ford Super Duty commercial pick-up chassis to reduce through life cycle costs, and automotives used in all SandCat generations have remained standard Ford wherever possible.

Automotives used in all SandCat generations have remain standard Ford wherever possible, the latest fourth-generation models powered by a Ford PowerStroke 6.7-litre V8 diesel developing 330 hp and coupled to a Ford TorqShift six-speed automatic transmission. Standard F550 drive axles are retained, however the front coil and rear leaf springs plus the brakes are uprated/tuned to suit operating weight. On second-generation models the rear leaf springs were swapped for a Plasan-designed coil spring and trailing arm set-up. Some elements of the electrical system are upgraded to suit specific requirements, with 24 V available if required.

The overall design of the SandCat is such that it can be adopted to perform a wide range of military and Police/internal security-related missions. The original SandCat featured a four- or five-seat protected crew citadel, this having two doors on each side plus two rear doors in the crew citadel that open into an open-topped rear stowage area. This stowage area which could be covered if required, is open-topped to save weight. First-generation ‘station wagon’ vehicles for Sweden could seat eight in an extended fully enclosed rear body. Second-generation models could seat up to five (Utility) or eight (Transport/TPV). Third-generation models seat up to 10.

Fourth-generation models, which are described by the manufacturer as having a more flexible and modular architecture, are available in three core configurations. The Troop Carrier which seats up to 10 is fully enclosed. The Utility has a fully armoured crew-type cab that seats up to five, while the Single Cab option seats up to three. In both instances, the rear of the chassis is available for a variety of payload options. Given the inherent adaptability of the base platform and the modularity of the SandCat's design, other configurations are possible.

In terms of styling for recognition, for the first time there are no visible Ford parts on the vehicle's exterior, the bonnet now a Plasan design. The new front has been designed to more easily allow for localisation or alternative identities. The default is a new interpretation of the feline SandCat grille first introduced on the second-generation model. A new window design has allowed for greater commonality across variants, there now being four unique glass shapes as opposed to eight on third-generation SandCats. The previous window designs remain available on request.

With regard to armouring, Plasan refers to SandCat's armouring as a kitted hull, this consisting of a selection overlapping bolted and bonded (not welded) panels. Armour composition has not been disclosed but is understood to include a steel base layer with a mix of internal/external aluminium, composite/ceramic and Kevlar components. The advantages of a bolted/bonded construction are stated to be ease of repair following damage, the option to upgrade parts or all of the protection as new technologies emerge, plus the ability to swap out specific panels to reconfigure a vehicle. An example here might be replacing a solid roof panel for one with a hatch and/or the ability to mount a weapon station. Firing ports for the crew are standard.

A key differentiator between the fourth and all previous SandCat generations is the latest generation's option of a monocoque body. This variant, the Mine-resistant Light Patrol Vehicle (M-LPV) is the first SandCat engineered as a fully structural monocoque. It retains the Ford F550 automotives but the ladder frame chassis is no longer required, the engine/gearbox utilising a sub-frame assembly that bolts to the monocoque. The key benefit of the monocoque design is a greater level of underbody blast protection without increasing the height, center of gravity, or weight of comparably configured base vehicles. A stated advantage of the monocoque is that a custom wheelbase can be selected without the associated engineering challenges of shortening any chassis.

Internally on both variants ballistic protection is augmented by spall lines, while underbody blast protection is augmented by a floating floor, proprietary foot pads and Plasan's own blast attenuating seats. The interior has two-zone air-conditioning as standard, and can be fitted with an NBC filtration system if required. Additional external protection options available for both versions of the fourth-generation SandCat include radiator, front wings, and critical engine components. A selection of internal and/or external manual or automatic fire suppression systems can be fitted to provide protection in areas such as the engine compartment, crew compartment, wheel arches, fuel tank and so on. At a lower level, mesh screens are available for all lighting and glazing.

Given the wide variety of variants and configurations available the options list for the SandCat is extensive. Equipment and fittings options can include: a GPS system, rifle holders, trailer tow hitch, weapon station (manual or remote), run-flat inserts, electric self-recovery winch, front-axle air-actuated differential lock, external searchlight, public address system, siren, roof-mounted flashing lights, external cameras, a non-slip coating on certain external surfaces, 24 V electrical circuit, blackout lighting, bull bars, and assault ladders to allow the dismounts access to the upper floor of buildings or similar.

The SandCat is reported to have excellent handling and acceleration for an armored vehicle.

== Gallery ==
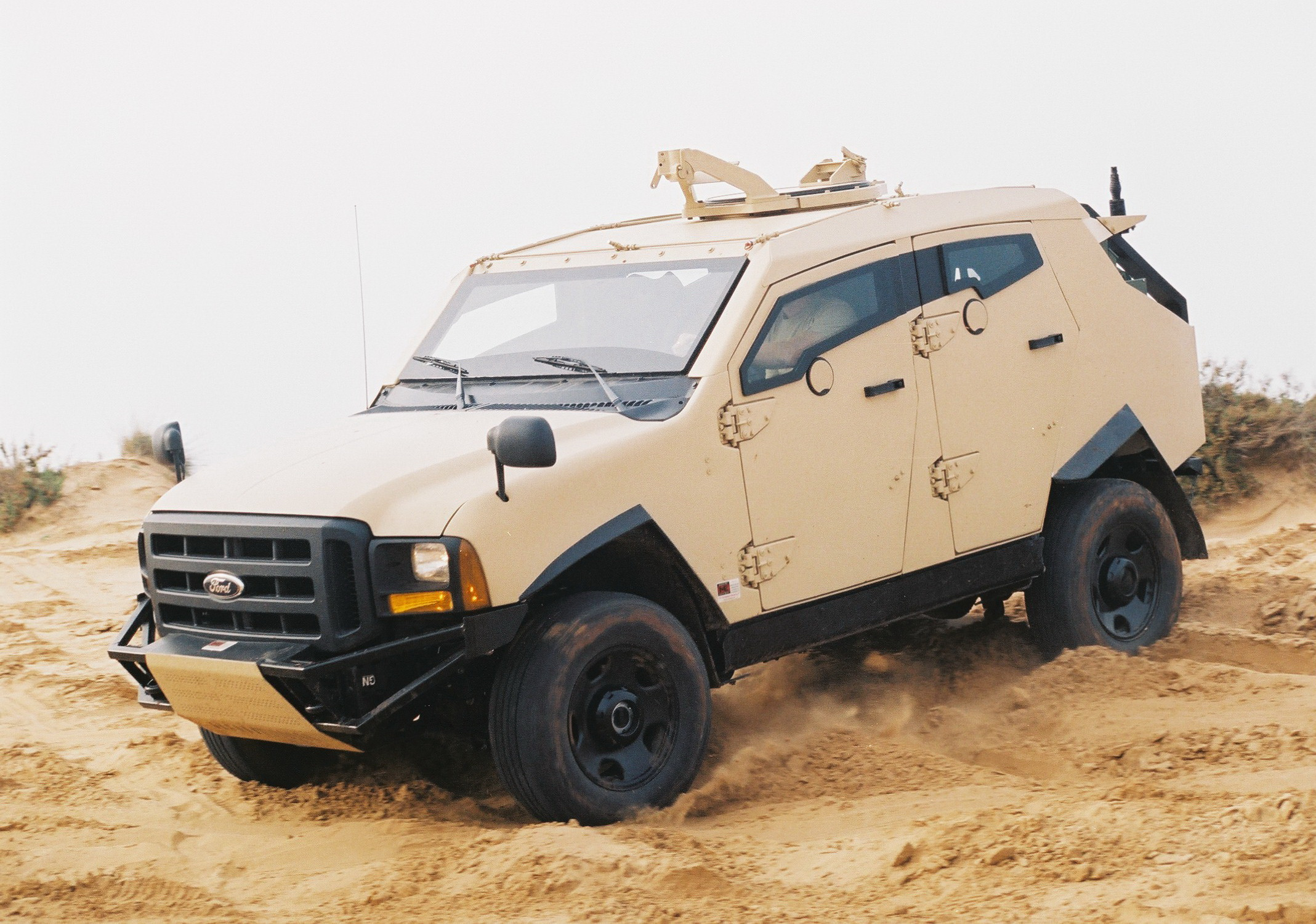
There have been four generations of the SandCat. The first-generation were mainly prototypes, this is the original prototype.

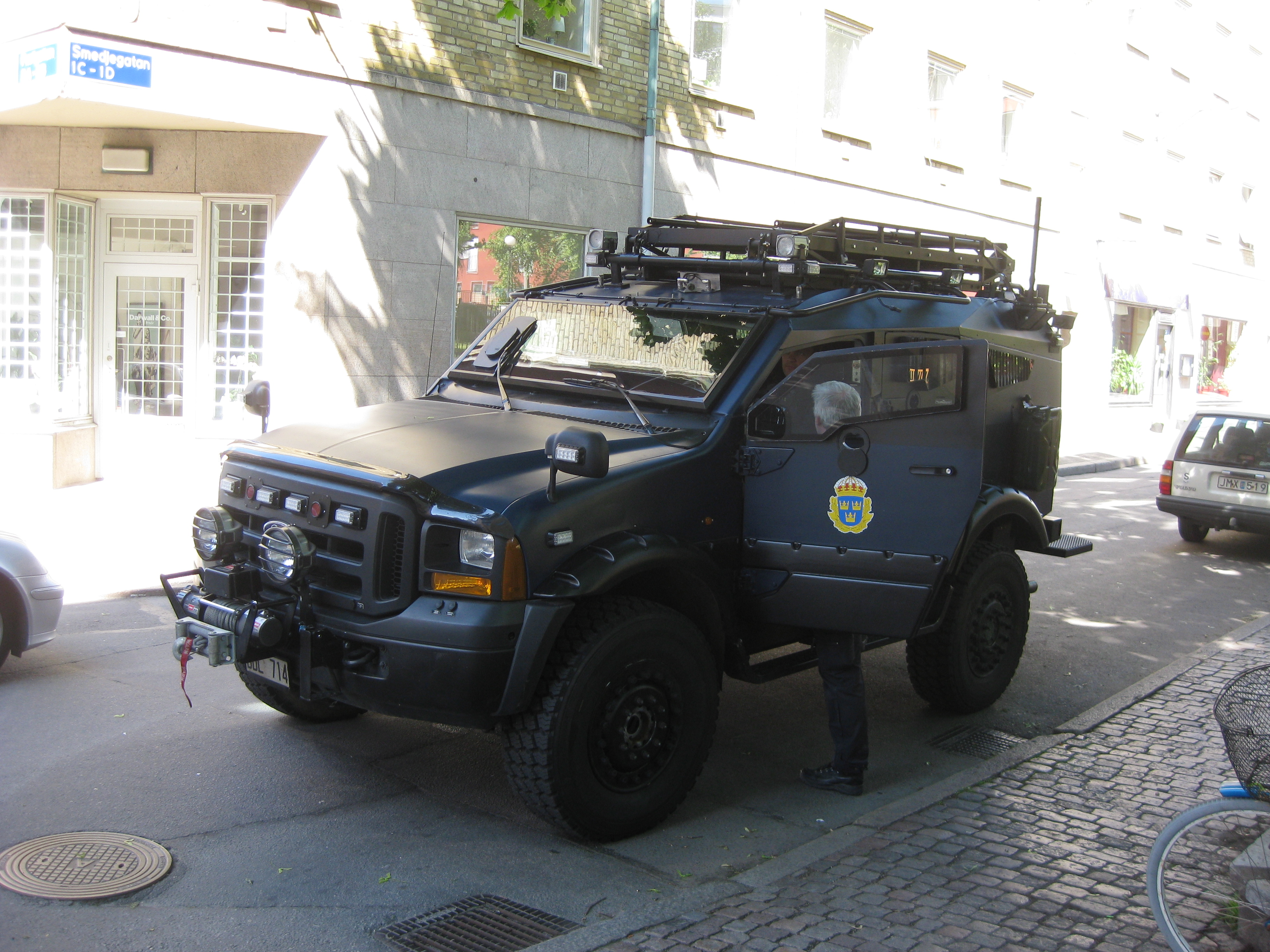
Sweden received a small quantity of first-generation SandCats during 2008 in an eight-seat station wagon configuration for a Police/SWAT-type role.

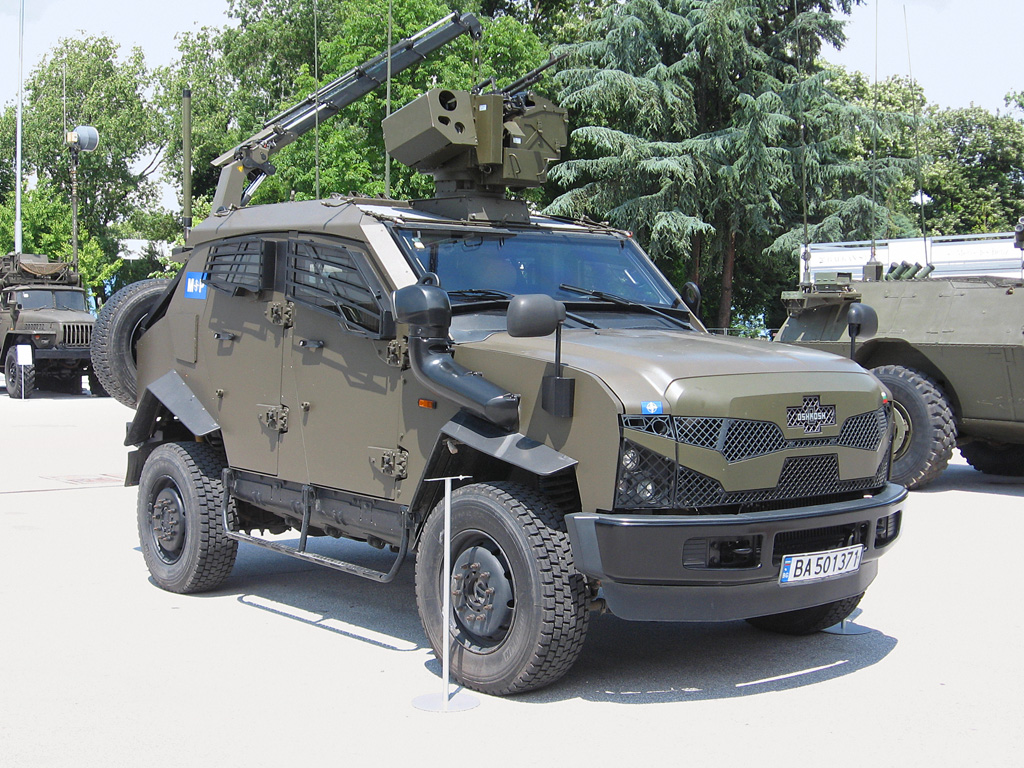
A Bulgarian 2nd generation SandCat Utility. In terms of styling the second-generation SandCat is the most varied and a variety of configurations can be seen.

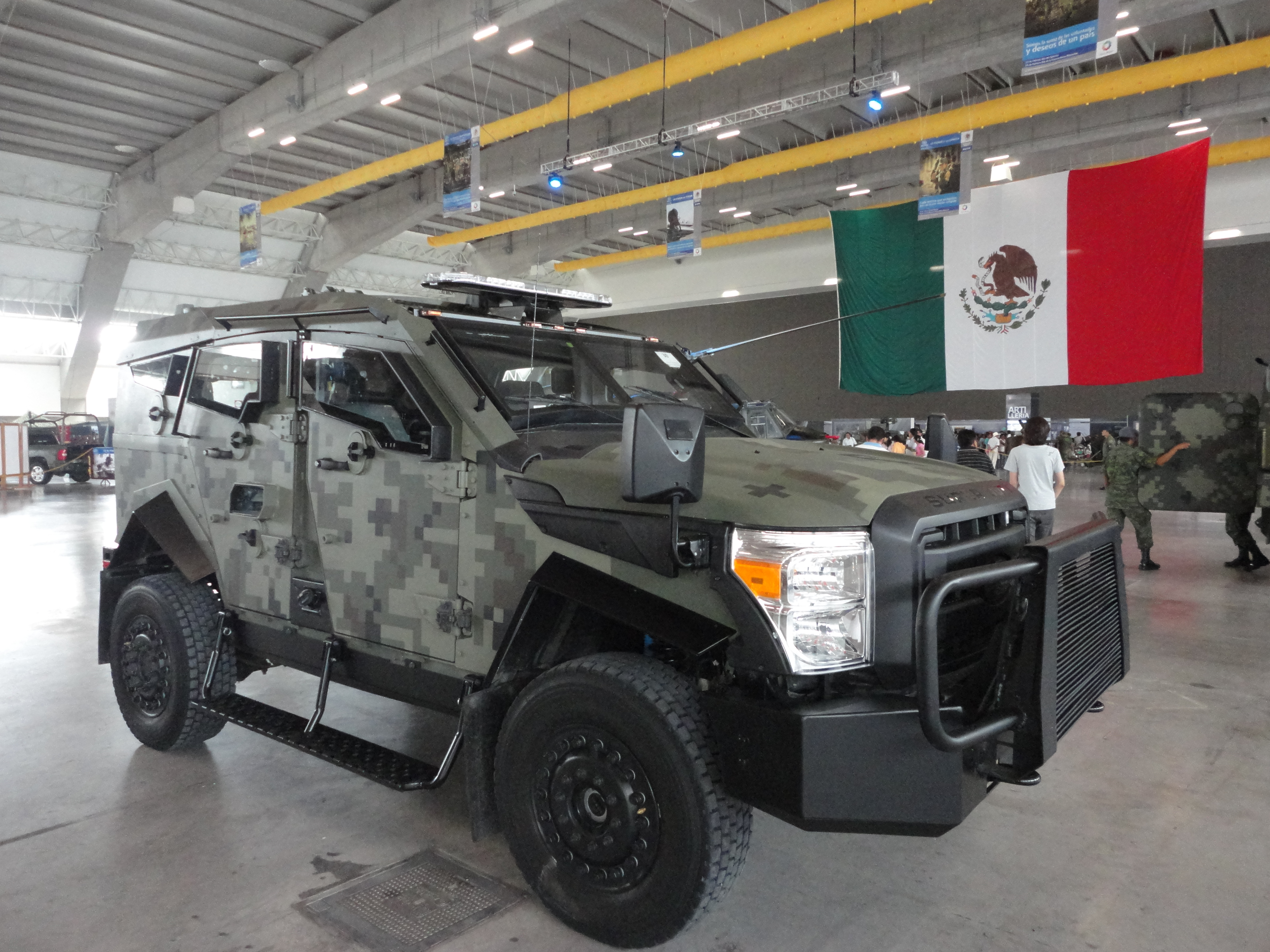
A Mexican SandCat as supplied by Oshkosh Defense. The similar-looking SandCat MX and DN-XI are not related to the Plasan or Oshkosh products in any way.

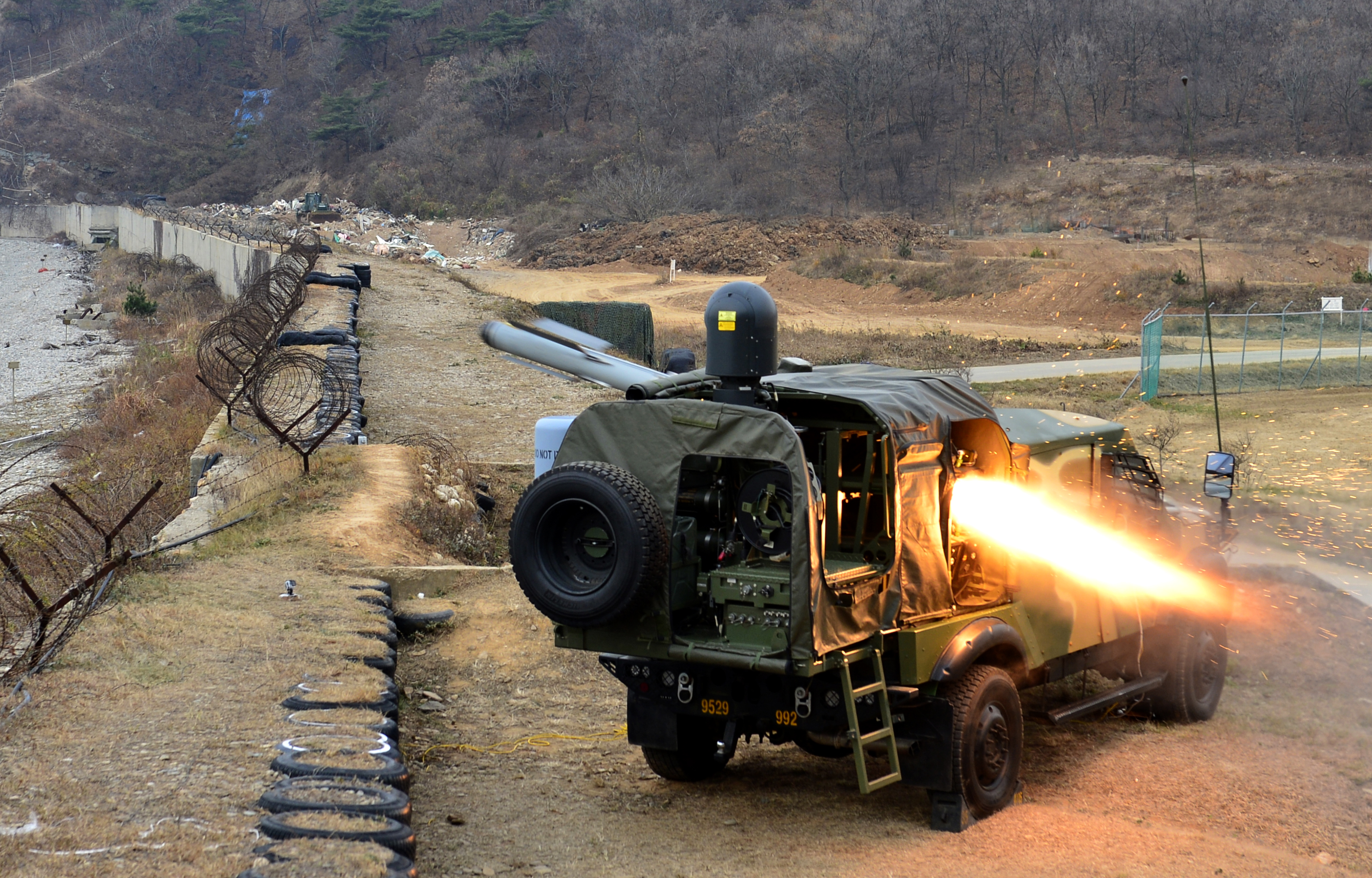
South Korea received its first 3rd generation SandCats in 2013, these fitted with RAFAEL Spike non line-of sight (NLOS)-guided missiles.

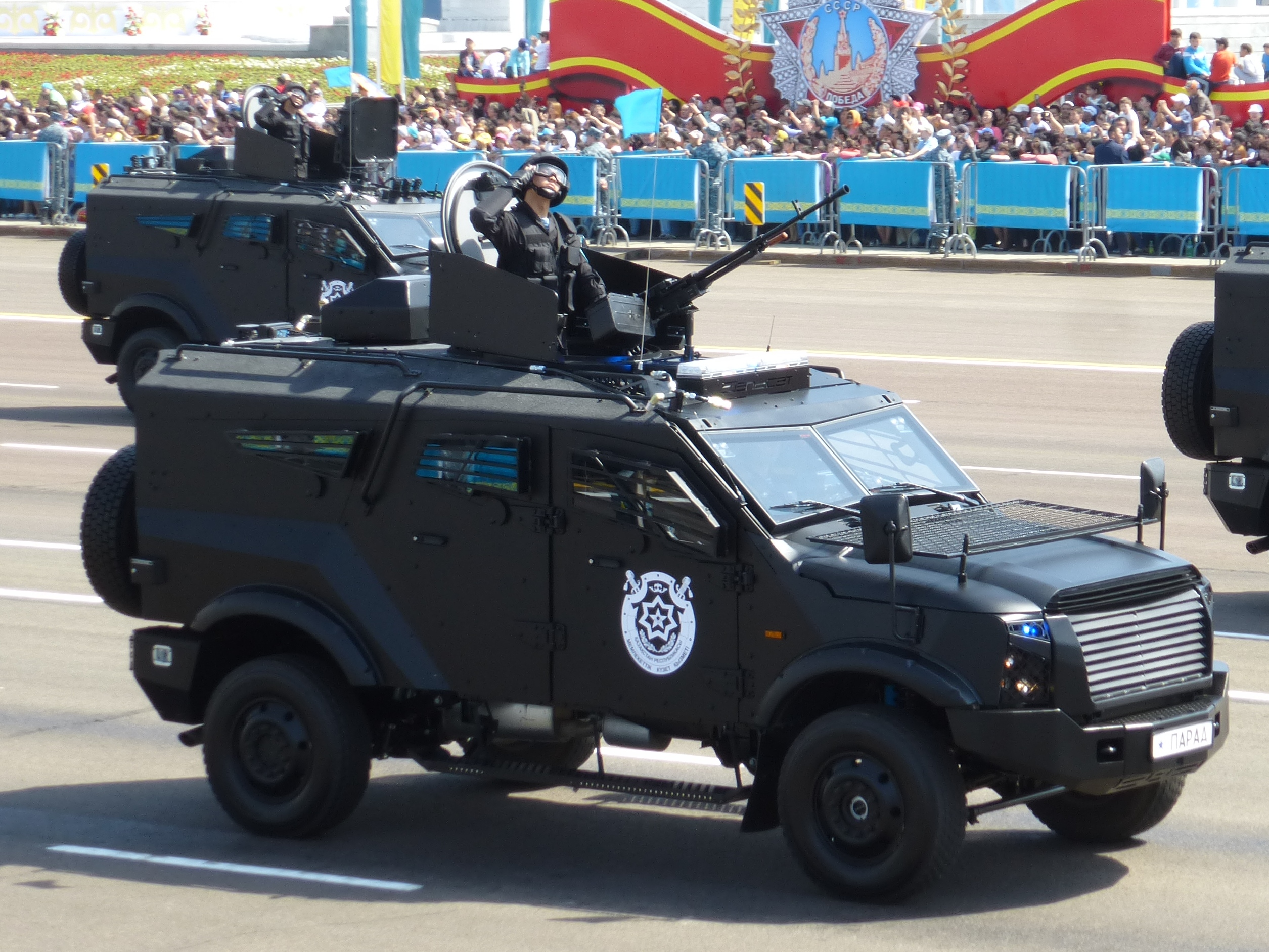
A Kazakh army 3rd generation SandCat mounting a NSV heavy machine gun.

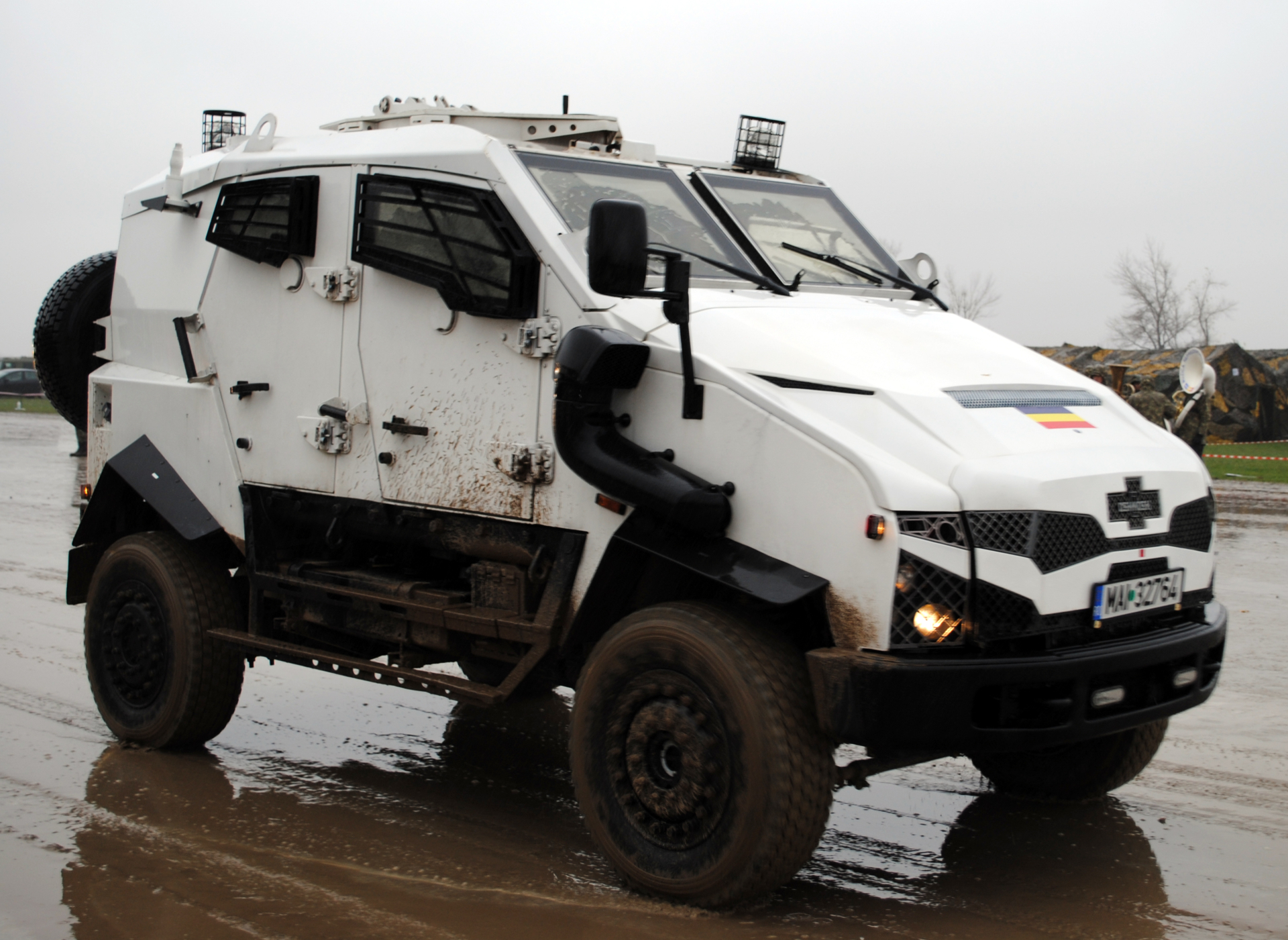
A SandCat used by the Romanian Gendarmerie's Brigada Specială de Intervenție a Jandarmeriei.

== Operators ==
Plasan has stated that approximately 700 SandCats have been produced since 2004, and while never releasing complete details, these are known to be in service with at least 17 users across five continents:

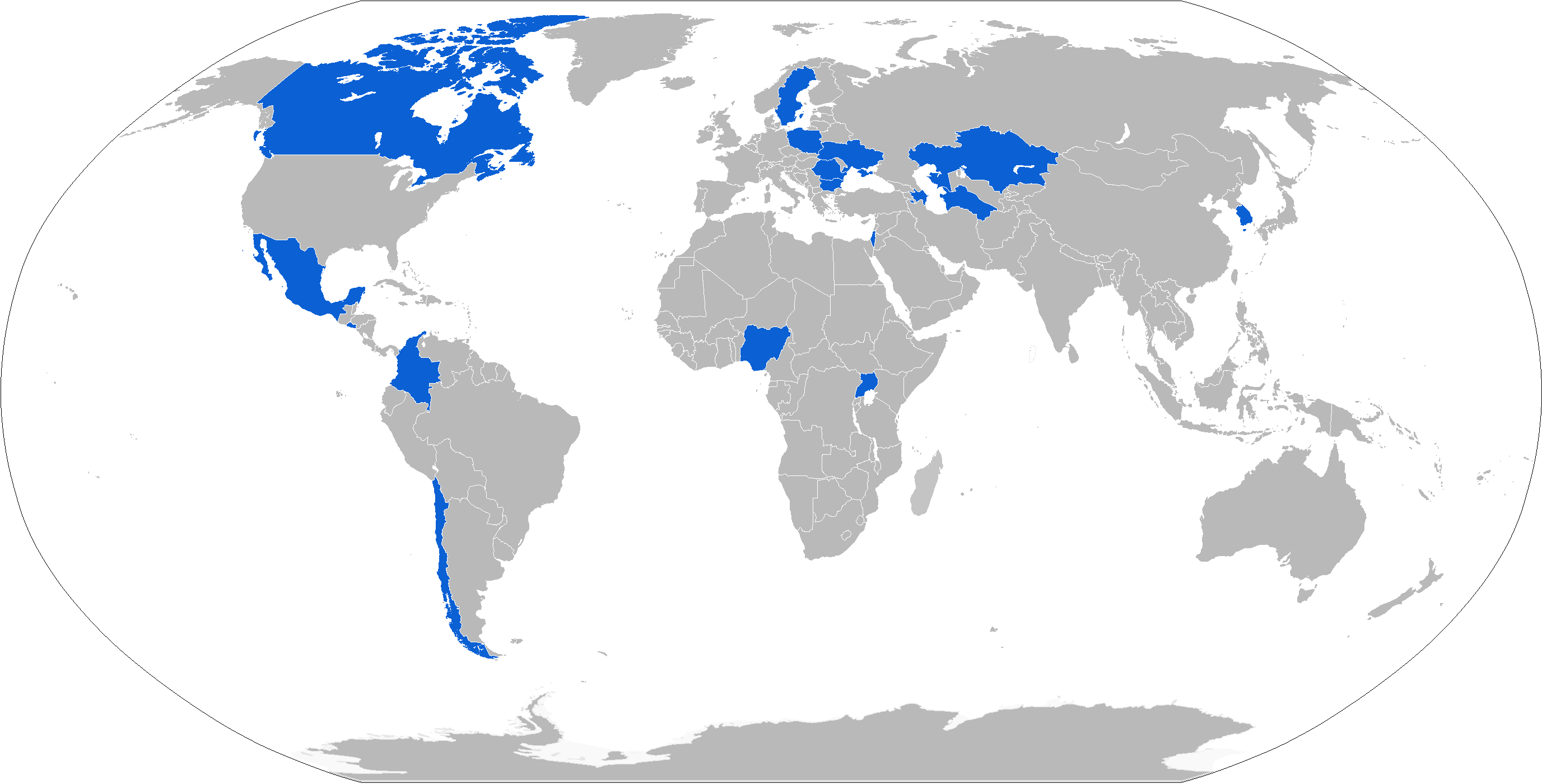
Map with SandCat operators in blue

- Azerbaijan: various versions, including armored personnel carrier, anti-tank guided missile carrier, reconnaissance and armored combat vehicle variants operated by the Azerbaijani Land Forces since 2016.
- Bulgaria: in use with Bulgarian Military Police.
- Canada: used by some local police SWAT units.
- Chile: operated by Carabineros de Chile (Carabiniers of Chile, Chilean national law enforcement gendarmerie).
- Colombia: 14 units procured in 2012 and 2013 for the National Army of Colombia.
- Greece: in April 2023 Greece ordered 17 Rafael Spike NLOS MissionTaskForce systems mounted on Plasan Sandcat. Each system consist of two vehicles mounting the Tamuz missile launchers with 10 Spike Missiles each, and one vehicle carrying the Orbiter 3 UAS launch complex for total of 51 units. Deliveries began in August 2025.
- El Salvador: 50 units procured by the Salvadoran Army.
- Israel: operated by Israeli Ground Forces, Israeli Border Police and Yamam.
- Kazakhstan: initial batch procured for the State Security Service directly from Plasan, later purchases assembled locally under licence.
- Mexico: 250 units procured in 2011 for Cuerpo de Fuerzas Especiales, the special forces battalion of Mexican Army. Assembled locally under licence from Plasan.
- Nigeria: operated by State Security Service.
- Poland: used by Military Gendarmerie.
- Romania: operated by Brigada Specială de Intervenție a Jandarmeriei (Gendarmerie Special Intervention Brigade).
- Republic of Korea: variants equipped with Spike anti-tank guided missile launchers in use with Republic of Korea Marine Corps.
- Sweden: was in use with Swedish Police Authority Reinforced Regional Task Force; replaced afterwards by ACMAT Bastion.
- Turkmenistan: at least 4 StormRider variants in service with Ministry for National Security.
- Ukraine: operated by Security Service of Ukraine since 2017.
- Uganda: 5 units equipped with Elbit Systems SPEAR 120 mm mortar in service with Uganda People's Defence Force.
- United Kingdom: 18 units ordered by the Metropolitan Police to replace the older Jankel models.
