= Andrés Manuel López Beltrán =

Mexican politician (born 1986)

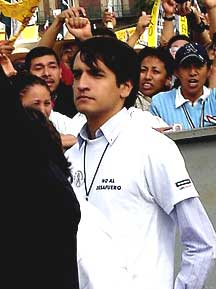
- López Beltrán in 2005

Secretary of Organization of the National Regenerational Movement
- In office 1 October 2024 – 25 May 2026
- President: Luisa María Alcalde Luján; Ariadna Montiel Reyes
- Preceded by: José Alejandro Peña Villa
- Succeeded by: Manuel Zavala Salazar

Personal details
- Born: 21 August 1986 (age 40) Macuspana, Tabasco, Mexico
- Parent(s): Andrés Manuel López Obrador; Rocío Beltrán Medina
- Education: National Autonomous University of Mexico
- Occupation: Politician

Andrés Manuel López Beltrán (Note: In this Mexican name, the surname is López and the second or maternal family name is Beltrán.) (born 21 August 1986) is a Mexican politician, representing the Morena political party. He is the second son of Andrés Manuel López Obrador, who was president of Mexico from 2018 to 2024. He is commonly known as "Andy", to distinguish him from his father.

In September 2024, López Beltrán gained attention when his appointment as Secretary of Organization of Morena was announced.

== Early life and career ==
Andrés Manuel López Beltrán was born on 21 August 1986 in Macuspana, Tabasco. He is the second son of Andrés Manuel López Obrador and Rocío Beltrán Medina.

López Beltrán studied political and social sciences at the National Autonomous University of Mexico (UNAM).

He is founder and majority owner of Finca Rocío S.A. de C.V., an artisanal chocolate company named in honor of his deceased mother. He is also a minority partner of Vinos Cósmicos S.A. de C.V., a wine company founded in 2021.

=== Political life ===
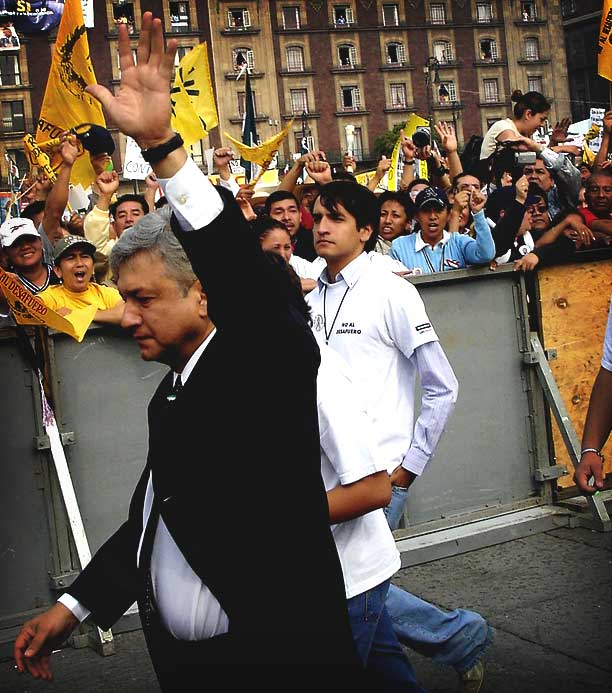
López Beltrán (behind Andrés Manuel López Obrador) during a 2005 event

López Beltrán has been close to the Morena party since its foundation.

During the 2018 presidential elections, he was in charge of the conformation of the committees for the promotion and defense of the vote of his father's campaign in Mexico City. In early September 2024, President López Obrador confirmed his son's participation in the party's structure, although without specifying the position. According to El País, it was President Claudia Sheinbaum herself who requested López Beltrán's support from the party leadership, and not from the government.

From 1 October 2024 to 25 May 2026, he served as Morena's Secretary of Organization. In July 2026 he announced his plans to seek Morena's nomination to compete for Tabasco's 6th district in the 2027 mid-term election, for which he was criticised by several opposition parties for campaigning ahead of the contest's official starting date. He filed a formal application to stand in October 2026.

== Corruption and money laundering allegations ==
=== Luxury travel ===
López Beltrán's 2025 stay at The Okura Tokyo, a luxury hotel in Japan, drew criticism in light of his father's policies of austerity and minimalism.

=== Fuel grand theft ===
During a visit by U.S. Secretary of State Marco Rubio in early September 2025, the Sheinbaum administration detained 14 top civilian and military officials. Among those arrested was Vice Adm. Manuel Roberto Farias Laguna, a relative of AMLO's navy secretary. The scandal also implicates three of the former president's sons, including Andrés López Beltran. They could face indictments in the United States in the near future.

=== Pharmaceuticals breach ===
The pharmaceutical dealings of "El Clan" (The Clan), an alleged influence-peddling network involving the sons of former President López Obrador, extended into President Claudia Sheinbaum's administration. The company Biosistemas y Seguridad Privada, a firm that secured multi-million peso contracts and sold products at inflated prices during López Obrador's administration, as revealed by Latinus, benefited in Sheinbaum's massive medicine procurement drive, with contract awards worth approximately 23 million pesos. This is the company that Jorge Amílcar Olán, alleged figurehead of AMLO's sons and the central persona in the corruption network, reportedly used to operate and win tenders in 2023 across two Mexican Social Security Institute (IMSS) regional offices. This was possible supposedly due to access to privileged information and his close relationship with officials such as Alejandro Calderón Alipi, former head of IMSS-Bienestar, and Daniel Asaf, the chief aide to López Obrador—both of whom are friends with López Beltrán.

=== Visa revocation ===
In August 2026, López Beltrán published a letter addressed to Donald Trump following the revocation of his travel visa. In it, López Beltrán described the action as unjustified, calling it politically motivated, "Hitlerian", "arrogant", and a "crude and perverse act".
