= Gustavo Sánchez Vásquez =

Mexican politician (1963–2016)

Senator for Baja California
- In office 2024–2026

Municipal President of Mexicali
- In office 2016–2019

Member of the Congress of Baja California
- In office 2013–2016

Personal details
- Born: 17 September 1963 Mexicali, Baja California, Mexico
- Died: 31 January 2026 (aged 62) Mexicali, Baja California, Mexico
- Party: PAN
- Education: UABC
- Occupation: Lawyer, politician

Gustavo Sánchez Vásquez (Note: In this Mexican name, the surname is Sánchez and the second or maternal family name is Vásquez.) (17 September 1963 – 31 January 2026) was a Mexican politician from the National Action Party (PAN). A lawyer by profession, he served as the municipal president of Mexicali, Baja California, in 2016–2019 and, at the time of his death, was a member of the Senate for the state of Baja California.

== Life and career ==
Gustavo Sánchez Vásquez was born in Mexicali on 17 September 1963. In 1984, he earned a law degree from the Autonomous University of Baja California (UABC), where he later taught. He founded his own private law firm in 1987.

In 2013 he was elected to a three-year term in the Congress of Baja California and, in 2016, to a three-year term as the municipal president of Mexicali. He sought re-election in 2019 but lost to Marina del Pilar Ávila Olmeda of the National Regeneration Movement (Morena).

In the 2024 general election he was elected to Baja California's third Senate seat for the duration of the 66th and 67th Congresses. During his time in the Senate, his committee assignments included Legislative Studies, Treasury and Public Credit, Foreign Affairs, North America, and Northern Border Affairs.

He was mentioned as a possible contender for the PAN in the 2027 election for governor of Baja California.

Sánchez Vásquez died in Mexicali on 31 January 2026, at the age of 62. His Senate seat was taken up for the remainder of his term by his alternate, José Máximo García López.
