= Ricaurte, Nariño =

Coordinates: 1°12′39″N 77°59′36″W

Ricaurte
- Municipality and town
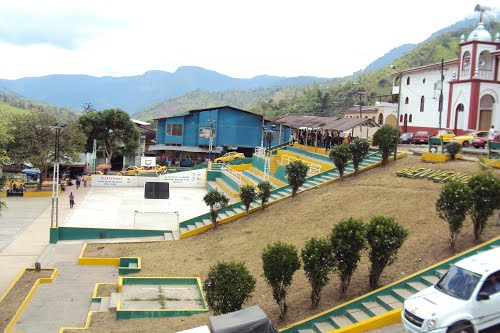
- View of Ricaurte, Nariño

- Flag

- Location of the municipality and town of Ricaurte in the Nariño Department of Colombia.
- Country: Colombia
- Department: Nariño Department

Population (Census 2018)
  - Total: 18,067
- Time zone: UTC-5 (Colombia Standard Time)

Ricaurte is a town and municipality in the Nariño Department, Colombia.

== Climate ==
Climate data for Ricaurte, elevation 1,181 m (3,875 ft), (1971–2000)
Month	Jan	Feb	Mar	Apr	May	Jun	Jul	Aug	Sep	Oct	Nov	Dec	Year
Mean daily maximum °C (°F)	24.0 (75.2)	24.7 (76.5)	25.1 (77.2)	25.3 (77.5)	25.0 (77.0)	24.7 (76.5)	24.6 (76.3)	24.5 (76.1)	24.8 (76.6)	24.7 (76.5)	24.6 (76.3)	24.4 (75.9)	24.7 (76.5)
Daily mean °C (°F)	19.3 (66.7)	19.6 (67.3)	19.9 (67.8)	20.1 (68.2)	19.9 (67.8)	19.8 (67.6)	19.6 (67.3)	19.6 (67.3)	19.6 (67.3)	19.5 (67.1)	19.5 (67.1)	19.5 (67.1)	19.7 (67.5)
Mean daily minimum °C (°F)	16.2 (61.2)	16.4 (61.5)	16.5 (61.7)	16.5 (61.7)	16.4 (61.5)	16.2 (61.2)	15.6 (60.1)	15.5 (59.9)	15.9 (60.6)	16.2 (61.2)	16.3 (61.3)	16.3 (61.3)	16.2 (61.2)
Average precipitation mm (inches)	385.1 (15.16)	311.0 (12.24)	352.8 (13.89)	379.9 (14.96)	404.5 (15.93)	271.0 (10.67)	179.4 (7.06)	188.9 (7.44)	259.1 (10.20)	472.1 (18.59)	388.8 (15.31)	398.3 (15.68)	3,990.9 (157.12)
Average precipitation days	28	24	26	25	27	25	21	20	22	28	26	27	298
Source: Instituto de Hidrologia Meteorologia y Estudios Ambientales
