= IBN Military Industries =

San Diego-based military supply company

- Native name: IBN Industrias Militares
- Type: Subsidiary
- Industry: Defense
- Headquarters: San Diego, California, United States
- Products: Vehicle armour systems Add-on armor kits Ballistic vests UAVs
- Parent: IBN Industrias Militares (Mexico)

IBN Military Industries, incorporated as INBRA USA Inc, is a military supplies manufacturing company located in San Diego, California. It is a subsidiary of the Mexican company IBN Industrias Militares, a Mexican-based vehicle manufacturer. Its CEO is Arturo Ávila Anaya.

== Products ==
The company opened the first private military industrial complex in the State of Aguascalientes, Mexico. It develops, manufactures, and assembles custom-built vehicle armour systems and chassis up-armor designs as well as Add-On Armor Protection Kits for lightweight military tactical trucks and also civilian armoring. They also manufacture and assemble ballistic vests, UAV, intelligence products among other products. In their facilities they give special training in cooperation with the IMI Academy of Israel.

In 2016 the company signed a contract with the Israeli company Plasan to assemble a new lightweight military vehicle called Sand Cat Stormer, featuring more ballistic resistance and new advanced technologies.
