= Ismael Burgueño =

Mexican politician (born 1983)

Mayor of Tijuana
- Incumbent
- Assumed office 1 October 2024
- Preceded by: Montserrat Caballero

Delegate of the Ministry of Foreign Affairs in Tijuana
- In office 19 August 2019 – 11 August 2020
- Preceded by: Jesús Antonio Carrillo Parra
- Succeeded by: Heriberto Lemuel Ramírez

Personal details
- Born: 31 August 1983 (age 43) Tijuana, Baja California, Mexico
- Party: Morena
- Education: Centro de Estudios Universitarios de Baja California (doctorate)
- Occupation: Politician, teacher, lawyer
- Website: https://www.ismaelburgueno.org/

Ismael Burgueño Ruiz (born August 31, 1983) is a Mexican politician, teacher and lawyer. He was elected Municipal President of Tijuana and took office on October 1, 2024, but has been on leave from the position since June 2026 while he seeks Morena's nomination for Governor of Baja California in the 2027 election. A founding member of Morena in Baja California, he previously served as delegate of Mexico's Ministry of Foreign Affairs in Tijuana and twice led the party's state committee in Baja California.

== Personal Life and Education ==
=== Early years and studies ===
Burgueño was born on August 31, 1983, in Tijuana, into a family of teachers; his father, mother and older sister all worked in primary education.

He holds a bachelor's degree in primary education from the Escuela Normal Fronteriza Tijuana, a master's degree in pedagogy from the Universidad Estatal de Estudios Pedagógicos, a law degree from the Universidad Humanitas, and a doctorate in educational management and policy from the Centro de Estudios Universitarios de Baja California. He worked as a teacher for twelve years at the Sistema Estatal de Bachillerato y Educación Superior-Instituto de Servicios Educativos y Pedagógicos (SEBS-ISEP) and later practiced law as legal counsel for Section 2 of the National Union of Education Workers (SNTE) in Tijuana, before entering politics.

== Political Career ==
Burgueño was a founding member of Morena in Baja California from the party's creation in 2014. In 2015, during the party's first election cycle in the state, he served as campaign coordinator for Federal District 4 and later as state councillor for the same district. In 2016, he became Morena's first-ever candidate for mayor of Tijuana, losing the National Action Party (PAN). In 2018, he sought Morena's internal nomination for mayor again but lost to Arturo González Cruz, whom he then supported in the general election; that same year he served as state coordinator of Defensa del Voto in Baja California during the presidential election won by Andrés Manuel López Obrador.

On August 19, 2019, foreign secretary Marcelo Ebrard appointed Burgueño delegate of the Ministry of Foreign Affairs (SRE) in Tijuana.In 2020 he resigned to lead the party's state committee.

On August 12, 2020, Morena's National Executive Committee appointed Burgueño acting president of the party's state committee in Baja California; the National Electoral Institute confirmed the appointment on September 24, 2020. He ceased to hold the position on April 29, 2021. On September 4, 2022, Morena's state council elected him president of the party's state committee in Baja California; he stepped down from that role in 2024, ahead of registering as a candidate for mayor of Tijuana.

== Presidency of the Municipality of Tijuana ==
Burgueño was nominated by Morena for the 2024 Tijuana mayoral election. On June 2, 2024, he was elected municipal president of Tijuana with 286,739 votes, equivalent to 58.37% of the vote and, at the time, the largest vote share recorded by a candidate in the city's history. He assumed office on October 1, 2024, succeeding Montserrat Caballero as head of the 25th City Council of Tijuana.

In July 2025, he launched the "Tijuana Segura" (Safe Tijuana) plan, focused on crime prevention, inter-agency coordination and citizen participation in public safety. On October 2, 2025, he presented his first annual government report to the city council, reporting a 2025 public-safety budget of 1.97 billion pesos, a multi-year public-works plan valued at 2.381 billion pesos, and a waste-collection and public-space program the city government said had benefited more than 700,000 residents.

On June 17, 2026, Burgueño requested a leave of absence from the mayoralty, effective June 22, to seek Morena's internal nomination for governor of Baja California in the 2027 election. Once approved by the city council, he formally registered on June 22 as an aspirant to the Coordinación Estatal de Defensa de la Cuarta Transformación, the nomination process for a coalition of Morena, the Green Ecologist Party (PVEM) and the Labor Party (PT).
