= Mobile phone registration in Mexico =

Mandatory registration of mobile telephone lines in Mexico

Mobile phone registration in Mexico is the legal requirement that every active mobile telephone line in the country be linked to an identified holder. Under the Telecommunications and Broadcasting Law of 2025 and guidelines issued by the Telecommunications Regulatory Commission (CRT) in December 2025, mobile operators may activate and maintain service only for lines associated with a subscriber who has presented official identification bearing a Unique Population Registry Code (CURP) for individuals or a Federal Taxpayer Registry number (RFC) for companies. The obligation applies to prepaid and postpaid lines, to both physical SIM cards and eSIMs, and to lines bought by foreign visitors, though not to travellers roaming on a foreign operator's service. Linking began on 9 January 2026.

The measure is the third Mexican attempt to end anonymous mobile telephony. A first registry, RENAUT, operated from 2009 until its repeal in 2011; roughly two-thirds of lines went unregistered, the database was leaked and offered for sale, and reported extortion rose during its operation. A second, PANAUT, required biometric data and was declared unconstitutional in its entirety by the Supreme Court of Mexico in April 2022, which held that it created a system of permanent and indiscriminate surveillance and failed a test of proportionality. The 2026 scheme was designed around that ruling: operators are forbidden to retain biometric data, photographs or copies of identity documents, and the government has said that subscriber information is held by the carriers rather than consolidated in a state database.

Registration proceeded more slowly than the government had planned. By the original deadline of 30 June 2026 fewer than half of Mexico's mobile lines had been linked, and the CRT replaced the deadline with a schedule staggered by the last digit of the telephone number, running from 15 August to 31 December 2026. The requirement has been challenged in more than ten thousand amparo suits, criticised by the digital rights organisation R3D, and opposed by the three main opposition parties in the Senate. President Claudia Sheinbaum has defended the measure as a preventive step against extortion and fraud.

== Background ==
=== RENAUT, 2009–2012 ===
The National Registry of Mobile Telephone Users (Registro Nacional de Usuarios de Telefonía Móvil, RENAUT) was created by a reform to the Federal Telecommunications Law approved on 9 February 2009, during the administration of Felipe Calderón. It was justified as a means of preventing and prosecuting kidnapping and extortion committed by telephone.

Subscribers registered by sending a text message containing their CURP, and the registration period ran from 10 April 2009 to 10 April 2010, after which unregistered lines were to be disconnected. Because the system verified nothing beyond the CURP itself, records could be created using another person's data: in April 2010 some 12,000 lines were found to have been registered in the name of President Calderón. About 27 million of roughly 83 million lines had been registered when the period closed.

The registry did not achieve its stated purpose. Reports of extortion rose by 26 per cent between December 2009 and January 2010 compared with the same period a year earlier. In June 2010 El Universal reported that the database was being offered for sale on the internet and on the black market, and copies were said to be circulating in the Tepito district of Mexico City. Congress abolished RENAUT on 29 April 2011, and the Secretariat of the Interior destroyed the database and its associated records on 15 June 2012.

=== PANAUT and the 2022 ruling ===
A second registry, the National Registry of Mobile Telephony Users (Padrón Nacional de Usuarios de Telefonía Móvil, PANAUT), was established by a decree reforming the Federal Telecommunications and Broadcasting Law published on 16 April 2021, the Chamber of Deputies having approved it in December 2020. Administered by the Federal Telecommunications Institute (IFT), PANAUT required subscribers to supply identifying information including their biometric data as a condition of holding a mobile line.

The registry was challenged from several directions. The National Institute for Transparency, Access to Information and Personal Data Protection (INAI) filed an action of unconstitutionality on 13 May 2021, and 48 opposition senators filed a second action, which the Court consolidated with the first as Acción de Inconstitucionalidad 82/2021 and its accumulated case 86/2021. The IFT separately brought a constitutional controversy on 26 May 2021, arguing that the decree encroached on its budgetary autonomy and regulatory powers; the Supreme Court granted the institute a suspension on 15 June 2021, which its First Chamber confirmed on 20 October 2021.

On 25 April 2022, the Court's plenary declared the decree invalid in its entirety, reaching the majority of eight votes required for a general declaration of invalidity. The judgment, drafted by Justice Norma Lucía Piña Hernández, held that the registry infringed the rights to privacy, intimacy and the protection of personal data in a manner that was neither reasonable nor necessary in a democratic society, and that it failed the third stage of a proportionality analysis because less restrictive alternatives existed. Justices noted that the decree set no limit on how long data could be retained and required no judicial authorisation for access, and the judgment described PANAUT as creating "a system of permanent and indiscriminate surveillance that allows the State to interfere with and directly monitor private life".

== Legal framework ==
=== Telecommunications and Broadcasting Law ===
The Telecommunications and Broadcasting Law was published on 16 July 2025, one of several statutes issued that day as part of a package on security, intelligence and telecommunications. It followed the organic simplification reform of December 2024, which abolished a number of autonomous constitutional bodies including the Federal Telecommunications Institute (IFT) and required a new regulatory framework for the sector. The law created the Telecommunications Regulatory Commission (CRT), a body of five members appointed by the executive and ratified by the Senate, which assumed the IFT's functions. Articles 103 and 164, fraction III, oblige concessionaires operating public telecommunications networks that provide mobile service to activate and maintain lines only for users who have presented official identification, in accordance with guidelines to be issued by the CRT.

R3D had objected to the registry provisions while the bill was before Congress, arguing that they were introduced alongside the National Investigation and Intelligence System Law, published the same day, which in the organisation's view permits security agencies to obtain records held by public and private bodies without a prior judicial order in every case. Rather than amend the registry provisions, the organisation urged Congress to pass comprehensive digital services legislation setting out duties of data protection, transparency, due process and accountability.

=== CRT guidelines ===
The CRT approved the Guidelines for the Identification of Mobile Telephone Lines (Lineamientos para la Identificación de Líneas Telefónicas Móviles) by resolution P/CRT/EXT/08122025/144, published in the Diario Oficial on 9 December 2025. They limit what operators may record to the subscriber's name or corporate name, the CURP or RFC, the telephone number, the type of identity document presented, the result and source of the identity validation, and a unique reference number for the linking or unlinking with its date and time. Operators are prohibited from storing biometric data, photographs, copies of official identification or any other documents. An individual may hold a maximum of ten mobile lines; there is no limit for legal entities, which must instead demonstrate their tax status. Individuals who already held ten or more postpaid lines when the guidelines took effect were exempt from the cap.

The guidelines set the implementation timetable, requiring operators to begin public information campaigns immediately, to enable a management platform within 30 days and a consultation platform within 60 days, and to begin linking lines within 30 days. Lines that remain unlinked are to be disabled, retaining only the ability to call emergency and citizen assistance numbers—911, 074, 079, 088 and 089—and the operator's own customer service, and to receive Common Alerting Protocol messages such as seismic alerts.

== Registration process ==
Registration is free and may be completed online through an operator's portal or application, through the CRT's own portal, or in person at a customer service centre. Operators sent subscribers a text message containing a link to their registration page; Telcel customers could also begin the process by sending the word REGISTRO to 4848.

Individuals must supply their CURP and a valid photographic identity document, such as the INE voter credential or a passport. Companies register using their corporate name and RFC together with the identification of a legal representative, and may validate the process with an electronic signature. Lines held by minors are registered by a parent or guardian. Online registration involves photographing both sides of the identity document and completing a "proof of life" check through the telephone's camera, which compares the holder in real time with the photograph on the document. The CRT stated that the process requests neither fingerprints nor iris scans and that the validation does not entail the storage of biometric data by the operators. Separately, the consultation platform required by the guidelines allowed subscribers to see which lines were associated with their CURP or RFC and to begin unlinking any they did not recognise.

== Implementation ==
Linking began on 9 January 2026 with a deadline of 30 June. Uptake was slow. Norma Solano Rodríguez, the CRT's first commissioner president, reported 30.2 million lines linked by 19 April 2026, and said that registrations were running at between 320,000 and 352,000 a day against the 1.5 million a day needed to meet the deadline; progress varied by operator, at 19 per cent of Telcel's lines, 29 per cent of AT&T's, 16 per cent of Movistar's and 28 per cent of Bait's. The CRT reported 56,797,762 lines linked as of 5 June 2026. The commission had counted 144,585,131 active mobile lines in the third quarter of 2025, defining an active line as one registering voice traffic during the quarter; of these, Telcel held 57.90 per cent, AT&T 16.42 per cent, Movistar 14.05 per cent and Bait 7.04 per cent.

On 26 June 2026, with about 63 million lines linked (40.2 million prepaid and 22.8 million postpaid), the CRT abandoned the single deadline in favour of a schedule staggered by the last digit of the telephone number. Lines ending in 0 had until 15 August 2026, those ending in 1 until 31 August, and so on in fortnightly steps through to lines ending in 9 on 31 December 2026. Operators are to suspend unlinked lines within 72 hours of the applicable date, and subscribers have 90 days to complete registration and request reactivation before a number may be reassigned.

Registration reached about 68 million lines by 26 July 2026 and 71,101,000, some 49 per cent of the total, by 15 August, when the first suspensions took effect. The CRT declined to grant a further extension. The consultancy The Competitive Intelligence Unit estimated that between 4 million and 8.7 million lines would be suspended in the first tranche.

The requirement has coincided with a contraction in the number of lines in service. The Competitive Intelligence Unit counted 157.1 million active mobile lines at the close of the second quarter of 2026, 4.9 million fewer than in December 2025, and attributed part of the decline to subscribers cancelling or allowing the lapse of secondary lines rather than register them. Sector revenue nonetheless grew 5.3 per cent year on year to 97.5 billion pesos in the same quarter.

=== Data exposure at Telcel ===
On 10 January 2026, the day after linking opened, the journalist Ignacio Gómez Villaseñor reported that Telcel's registration portal returned the name, CURP, RFC and email address of the holder of any number entered, before the user had completed identity verification and without a password or a code sent by text message.

Telcel denied that a mass leak had occurred, attributing the episode to a technical error and to saturation from a volume of registrations that had already exceeded 300,000, and said it had taken the portal offline to correct the fault. Víctor Ruiz, chief executive of the cybersecurity firm Silikn, attributed the exposure to an inadequate server configuration and said the incident was serious because the government had delegated the safekeeping of the data to the telephone companies. Federal authorities opened an inquiry, and reporting noted that the federal personal data protection law provided for administrative penalties of up to 320,000 units of measurement and updating for breaches involving sensitive information.

== Legal challenges ==
The first amparo against the guidelines was admitted on 26 January 2026 by a district judge specialising in economic competition, broadcasting and telecommunications. Filed by the lawyer César Pineda Zárate, it argued that the requirement interfered arbitrarily with privacy and confidentiality and permitted access to personal data without judicial oversight.

In June 2026, Francisco Sánchez Villegas, a Citizens' Movement deputy in Chihuahua, organised a collective action, filed on 24 June in the twelfth district court of that state as case 1581/2026. Among its arguments were objections to the retention of geolocation data by carriers and to the breadth of official access to subscriber records; Sánchez Villegas said of the registry that "the government says it's for security; no, it's for spying". By 1 July 2026 he reported that 10,300 people had sought relief, comprising 1,300 in the collective suit and some 9,000 individual filings, and described the action as the largest of its kind in the country's history.

On 17 June 2026, the Second Collegiate Court in Administrative Matters, deciding complaint 260/2026, upheld a provisional suspension allowing a complainant to register his lines without providing biometric data, reasoning that the collection of biometric information could infringe privacy and create irreparable risks in the event of a breach. The court observed that the CRT guidelines did not require biometric data in any case. The ruling protected only the person who brought the suit and did not affect the requirement generally.

== Reception ==
=== Privacy and surveillance ===
R3D, which had campaigned against both earlier registries, argued when linking began that the guidelines had been issued without safeguards against abuse. The organisation said that the CRT had rejected its recommendation that operators be required to report requests for access to subscriber data, that the guidelines do not define which authorities may consult the registry, and that the National Investigation and Intelligence System Law could permit unrestricted access. It warned that identifying every line allows the inference of "information from a person's most intimate sphere, including their location, online activities and political positions", and that migrants and people in transit face particular difficulty because they must present a passport or a provisional CURP.

Writing before the law's passage, R3D's Vladimir Chorny said it was "impossible for privacy, data protection and non-discriminatory access to technology to be respected" while the registry stood, and that the right to data protection was "nullified in practice by the provisions creating the registry". The organisation noted that the Supreme Court had struck down PANAUT in 2022, "which ought to be reason enough to eliminate it", and argued that registries of this kind become "a weapon that subjects these rights to acts of corruption, the sale of databases, or measures incompatible with the Constitution".

The government has rejected the characterisation of the scheme as a surveillance instrument. On 15 June 2026 federal agencies stated that subscriber information "is not concentrated in a single government database" and that each operator is responsible for holding and protecting its own customers' data. Defending the measure on 13 August 2026, Sheinbaum said that Mexico was unusual in not associating SIM cards with identified holders, which allowed criminals to buy chips in quantity, and that companies rather than the government retained the data, which authorities could obtain only on judicial request in fraud or extortion investigations. She described the requirement as "a preventive action" and said that registering was "to look after one another—it isn't that you are a criminal", adding that a suspended line could be recovered simply by completing the process.

=== Effectiveness ===
The CRT has said the requirement seeks to eliminate the anonymous and illicit use of SIM cards and to curb extortion, which it stated is carried out by telephone call in up to 80 per cent of cases. R3D disputes the premise, citing a finding by the GSMA that "no evidence exists showing that mandatory registration of telephone lines has any effect on the reduction of these crimes", and arguing that 90 per cent of telephone extortion is conducted over voice over IP services that fall outside the registry.

Comparative assessments have reached similar conclusions. Privacy International, which counted 157 governments requiring some proof of identity to buy a SIM card as of early 2021, describes such laws as "costly, intrusive and not the solution" to the problems they are meant to address, and notes that a European Commission examination in 2012 found no benefit either for criminal investigations or for the common market. The organisation records Mexico's 2009 registry as having been repealed three years later after failing to reduce crime or improve prosecution rates.

=== Industry response ===
Mobile operators and industry analysts opposed the scheme, objecting to its cost and to what they regarded as the weakness of its identity checks. Reporting in May 2026 put the direct cost to operators—Telcel, AT&T, Telefónica, Altán Redes and the virtual network operators—at more than 4 billion pesos, against 22 million pesos for the central platform, and about three times the cost of the abandoned PANAUT.

Mony De Swaan Addati, president of the Mexican Association of Virtual Mobile Operators (AMOMVAC), said the registry as designed should be "thrown in the trash". Ernesto Piedras, director general of The Competitive Intelligence Unit, said the government was transferring costs, operational risk and reputational damage to the operators without guaranteeing the security of the data. Industry criticism also held that, because remote registration relies on a photograph of an identity document and a proof-of-life check rather than on biometric verification against a government record, the scheme validates identity too weakly to achieve its purpose.

Analysts further warned that the requirement would depress connectivity among the users least able to complete it. Prepaid lines, historically the segment driving adoption, absorbed most of the contraction: in the first quarter of 2026, AT&T lost 577,000 prepaid lines and América Móvil 391,000, while the virtual operators recorded their first quarterly decline since the second quarter of 2019. Piedras attributed the shortfall in registration to a lack of knowledge, of interest and of trust among consumers, and specialists identified limited digital skills and distance from service centres as obstacles for rural and low-income users.

=== Political opposition ===
The three main opposition parties in the Senate objected to the requirement. In January 2026, PRI senators called for its suspension, arguing that it endangered privacy, the presumption of innocence and public safety, that it lacked adequate safeguards and oversight, and that it repeated the failures of the earlier registries; they said the state should combat crime through intelligence rather than mass data collection.

As the June deadline approached, the National Action Party (PAN) senator Mario Vázquez sought a 180-day extension, citing inconsistencies in the process, the absence of clear mechanisms to correct or cancel improperly registered lines, and the lack of public information on errors and complaints. Clemente Castañeda, the Citizens' Movement (MC) coordinator in the Senate, proposed extending the registration period from 120 to 360 business days, noting that only 48 million of 144 million active lines had been linked by 13 May and warning of "a disconnection without precedent" among low-income and rural users; he said the implications of a mass disconnection on that scale were "of the utmost social gravity".

Senator Alejandra Barrales, the MC deputy coordinator, introduced an initiative to repeal articles 103 and 164, fraction III, and the thirtieth transitory article of the Telecommunications and Broadcasting Law, and to require the destruction of all information already collected so that it could not be reused or transferred. Barrales argued that conditioning access to a telecommunications service on the mass registration of personal data was a clear violation of fundamental rights, and that crime should be fought through precise intelligence and investigation rather than mass data collection.

=== Public opinion ===
A survey by the polling firm México Elige, published in May 2026, found 56 per cent of respondents opposed to linking personal data to telephone lines on the ground that it violated privacy, against 26.3 per cent who supported it as a means of preventing crime and 15.8 per cent who would support it if data protections were strengthened. Some 69.9 per cent said they were very or somewhat concerned that registration could lead to identity theft or the misuse of their data, and 62.3 per cent regarded the suspension of unregistered lines as a violation of rights, against 26 per cent who considered it just and necessary.

=== Registration without consent ===
As linking progressed, subscribers reported through social media that they had found telephone numbers already associated with their CURP that they had never contracted, raising the possibility that identity data had been used to activate lines. The CRT's consultation platform allows such lines to be identified and unlinked, a process requiring the holder to submit identification and complete a proof-of-life check, and authorities recommended acting promptly to forestall fraud or contracts entered into without the holder's consent.

== Foreign visitors ==
Foreign nationals who acquire a SIM or eSIM from a Mexican operator must link it, presenting a valid passport or a provisional CURP; the operator records the holder's full name, country of origin, passport number or provisional CURP, and telephone number. Visitors who remain on their home operator's service through roaming, or who use an international eSIM contracted before travelling, fall outside the requirement. The CRT confirmed this distinction in the run-up to the 2026 FIFA World Cup, of which Mexico was a co-host.

== See also ==
- SIM Registration Act
- Telecommunications in Mexico
- Mass surveillance
