= Carlos Alberto Torres Torres =

Mexican politician

- Born: 18 November 1975 (age 50); Baja California, Mexico
- Education: Autonomous University of Baja California
- Occupation: Politician
- Political party: PAN, Morena
- Spouse: Marina del Pilar Ávila Olmeda (m. 2019; div. 2025)

Carlos Alberto Torres Torres (born 18 November 1975) is a Mexican politician. Previously affiliated with the National Action Party (PAN), he currently belongs to the National Regeneration Movement (Morena). From 2006 to 2009, during the 60th Congress, he sat in the Chamber of Deputies as a plurinominal deputy for the PAN. In 2024, he was appointed head of Strategic Projects in Tijuana by Mayor Ismael Burgueño.

== Education ==
He received a law degree from the Autonomous University of Baja California.

== Personal life ==
Carlos Alberto Torres is the husband of Marina del Pilar Ávila Olmeda, the current (2021–2027) governor of Baja California.
