= Marina del Pilar Ávila =

Mexican politician (born 1985)

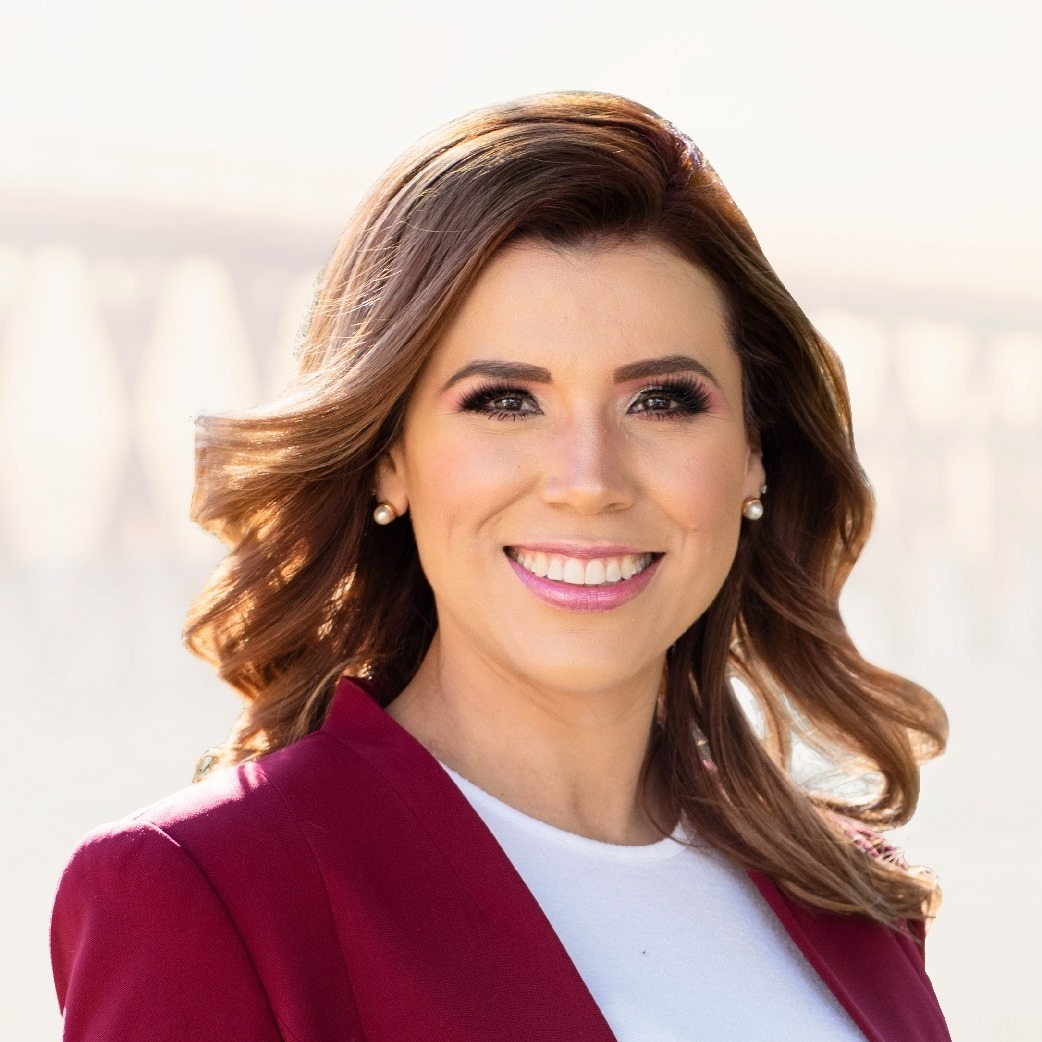
- Ávila Olmeda in 2021

17th Governor of Baja California
- Incumbent
- Assumed office 1 November 2021
- Preceded by: Jaime Bonilla Valdez

Mayor of Mexicali
- In office 1 October 2019 – 6 March 2021
- Preceded by: Gustavo Sánchez Vásquez
- Succeeded by: Guadalupe Mora Quinonez

Member of the Chamber of Deputies for Baja California's 2nd district
- In office 1 September 2018 – 1 March 2019
- Preceded by: Luz Argelia Paniagua Figueroa
- Succeeded by: Martha Lizeth Noriega Galaz

Personal details
- Born: Marina del Pilar Ávila Olmeda; 19 October 1985 (age 40) Mexicali, Baja California, Mexico
- Party: MORENA
- Spouse: Carlos Torres Torres (m. 2019; div. 2025)
- Children: 2
- Education: Center for Technical and Higher Education (LLB); Monterrey Institute of Technology and Higher Education (LLM); Autonomous University of Baja California (MPA)
- Occupation: Lawyer

Marina del Pilar Ávila Olmeda (born 19 October 1985) is a Mexican politician and attorney. A member of the MORENA party, she is the current Governor of Baja California, the first woman to serve in the position. Prior to this, she was the first woman to serve as mayor of Mexicali from 2019 to 2021, and represented Baja California's 2nd electoral district in the Chamber of Deputies in the LXIV Legislature. Polling conducted in December 2024 found her to be the most popular politician in the country, with an approval rating of 69.7%.

== Personal life ==
Olmeda, an only child, was involved in cultural activities such as ballet and music lessons at a young age.

On 29 September 2019, Ávila Olmeda married Carlos Torres Torres.

Ávila Olmeda announced her second pregnancy on 8 July 2021. She made it public via social media with a photograph of her husband by her side, both holding a picture of the ultrasound.

Ávila announced she would not apply for maternity leave and proceeded to make history by becoming Mexico's first pregnant head of state government; on 12 January 2022, she gave birth to her second child, Diego José and continued working remotely from home for a couple of days following the delivery, under her doctor's recommendations. The birth took place in Brawley, California.

In May 2025, the United States government revoked the visas of Ávila and her husband. The announcement, made public by the couple, generated controversy due to the lack of official information regarding the reasons behind the U.S. decision.

== Education ==
In 2009, Marina del Pilar graduated with a Law Degree from Centro de Enseñanza Técnica y Superior (CETYS Universidad), obtaining the Distinguished Alumni Recognition for High Academic Achievement and subsequently enrolled in two master's degrees.

She obtained her first master's degree in 2011 for Public Law from Monterrey Institute of Technology and Higher Education, with the thesis: "The Age of Criminal Responsibility in the Mexican Legal System."; the second degree was acquired in 2016 for Public Administration by the Social and Political Sciences Faculty of the Autonomous University of Baja California (UABC), where after a selection phase, she obtained a CONACYT Scholarship.

In her path through academia, Ávila published various articles in legal magazines and editorials, just like the one titled "Evolution of the Electoral Institute and Citizen Participation in Baja California"; also participating as a co-author in a chapter titled "Reflections surrounding academic teaching and investigation on Constitutional Law for legal training" in the book "Constitutionalism. Two centuries from her origins in Latin America", published by the Institute of Juridical Investigations of the National Autonomous University of Mexico.

Ávila kept evolving in her academic career as a scholar in the Social and Political Sciences Faculty of the UABC. In different interviews and public speeches, she has stated that her students were a big part of her inspiration in partaking in a leading role in local politics.

== Political career ==
=== Early political career ===
Ávila Olmeda became a member of the MORENA political party in 2015, encouraged by the principles of the Party's National Leader back then, Andrés Manuel López Obrador. She ran for a seat in the Congress of Baja California representing the third district. Even though she did not win, Ávila assures to have "succeeded in the streets" because of the connection she had made with the electorates. After the election, in 2016, she was titled as Coordinator of Organization for Morena in Mexicali, Baja California.

=== Campaign for federal representative (2018) ===
In 2018, Ávila ran as a candidate for Federal Representative to the 2nd electoral district, by the "Juntos Haremos Historia" (Together We Will Make History) coalition, consisting of MORENA, the Labor Party (PT), and the Social Encounter Party (PES). Proposing on early debates to lower public transport fees for college students and elderly adults and lower taxes in her state.

In this electoral process, Ávila received violent threats for her to abandon the race; she was also a victim of gender and political violence, as she recalls in a Yahoo! News interview:

"When I made public my intentions to participate as a candidate, the Delegate of Morena in Baja California, in 2018, told me he was interested in me. I didn't understand it as violence; I even began apologizing if I ever conducted myself in a misinterpreted manner. Yet I kept working with the limitation I had gotten from this person. Even after all that, I managed to become a candidate. It is something I've kept quiet for so long because I was too ashamed to share it."

After everything mentioned before, the candidate continued her campaign, taking a strong position against violence towards women. Del Pilar spoke openly about the necessity to embrace investigation protocols and strengthen capacitance for public servers that deal with femicides, likewise, she calls to reinforce prevention and attend the signs of violence in the early stages of relationships and domestic violence seriously.

Ávila became a federal representative to Baja California's 2nd congressional district at the LXIV Legislature in the Chamber of Deputies.

=== Baja California's federal representative (2018–2019) ===
Ávila began her functions as a federal representative on 1 September 2018, participating as secretary in the Metropolitan and Urban Development, Territorial Planning and Mobility Committee, and member in the Committees of Northern Border Affairs, Governance and Population. Regarding her work in Congress, her highlights are her passed initiatives to increase the penalty for those who commit the criminal act of sexual tourism; the other one is to typify the acts of domestic violence as a felony that requires pre-trial detention.

Other notable contributions in her labor as Congresswoman include the reduction of value-added taxes in Mexico's northern border, the transparency at disclosing state assets, attention to the migratory crisis in the state, reduction of public transportation fees, and the releases of resources towards renovating International Border Crossing in Mexicali.

On 1 March 2019, she applied for a leave license which permitted her to run for Mayor's Office of the city of Mexicali.

=== Campaign for mayor (2019) ===
Ávila began her campaign for mayor as a candidate postulated for the "Juntos Haremos Historia" (Together We Will Make History) coalition, consisting of MORENA, the Labor Party (PT), Ecologist Green Party of Mexico (PVEM) and Transformemos (Let’s Transform). On 15 April 2019, her first public appearance was at 7 am at a busy crossroad, accompanied by fellow party members and supporters.

During the electoral process, Ávila was once again a target of political violence regarding her gender and also suffered a series of attacks on her personal life, which she has stated before in interviews:

"(…) I was pointed out for my physical appearance, even my smile was a topic up for debate, issues that aren't important for candidacy, nor for the wielding of public service.". "(…) I encountered an extremely violent campaign against myself and my external appearance, also the simple fact being a young woman and a single mother too, at the time. They didn't spare my private life either, like my daughter; they still do so today."

On 29 May 2019, the campaign for Mayor's Office came to an end. In front of thousands of citizens, Ávila closed with these priority issues: security, excellence in public services, improved roadways, the decline in air contamination and better infrastructure for the city.

On the day of election, 2 June 2019, Ávila triumphed as the new City Mayor, with 45.46% of the votes. On 13 June, the Institute of Electoral Elections of Baja California gave Avila her constancy of majority, acknowledging her officially as Mayor-Elect of Mexicali.

In late July 2021, Mayor-Elect Ávila started her transitional activities and began to introduce her work team, who took the oath of office alongside her on 30 September 2019, right on the Mexicali's Historical Centre, becoming so the first elected women to serve as Mayor in this city.

=== Mexicali's city mayor (2019–2021) ===
Ávila commenced serving as mayor on 1 October 2019, and shortly began to fulfill her campaign promises, such as inaugurating Municipal Institute for Women, as well as offices and lines for Pink Force, to give preventive attention to women at risk of violence. She revised preexistent anomalies in the infrastructure sector that led to the cancellation of 27 projects from the past administration, which was bided again and ended up as an investment towards the city for 32'195,492 Mexican pesos.

Other distinctive projects under her administration were about culture and the arts; in her first weeks in office, "Chinese Day" was officially established on 12 November as a memorial day to celebrate the Chinese community, given its significance in developing the city. Ávila funded projects like the modernization of Mexicali's Historical Centre, which was an investment of 39.1 million Mexican pesos. After reparations ended, social and touristic activities reactivated in the famous "Chinesca," and the "Wok Museum" of Chinese food inaugurated as a symbol of fellowship between both cultures.

In her first year, Ávila disclosed to have had the lowest crime incidence in the last ten years of the city's record, with a decrease of 12%.

In January 2021, the pollster house Consulta Mitofsky placed Ávila in the top 3 mayors best evaluated in Mexico,

In March 2021, she applied for a leave license to postulate in the State Governor election race.

=== Campaign for governor ===
On 4 April 2021, Ávila began her campaign as a candidate for Governor at San Quintín, Baja California; postulated by the "Juntos Haremos Historia" (Together We Will Make History) coalition (consisting of MORENA, the Labor Party [PT], and the Ecologist Green Party of Mexico [PVEM]). Her campaign has been described as "Mexico's best campaign" from the 2021's election season.

Her central positions focused on promoting public welfare programs, boosting creative and touristic industries, reactivating economic investments for the region, increasing sports culture, and most notably reinforcing security for all citizens.

Ávila got recognition for running her campaign alongside a program titled "Wellness for Baja California's Youth Agenda," created by young people. It covered topics like culture, sports, sustainability, security, welfare, and establishing mechanisms to guarantee youth participation in public policies.

Ávila was a victim of verbal attacks qualified as political and gender violence by the Tribunal of Electoral Justice of Baja California. Nevertheless, the candidate's poll numbers were not affected thanks to efficient use of social media, intertwined with her physical campaign, she became a favorite to obtain the title of Governor. The then-candidate had campaign closure events all over the state, coming to an all end in the city of Tijuana event with over 20,000 attendees.

On 6 June 2021, election day, Ávila obtained 542,035 votes, representing 48.4950% of voters, and with that majority became Governor-Elect. Celebrating her triumph in Mexicali, where she once again stated before its citizens her commitment to her party's principles, "don't lie, don't steal, and don't betray".

The Electoral Institute of Baja California validated Ávila's triumph and rewarded her with the constancy of majority on 15 June, which accredited her officially as Governor-Elect. In August, she began the transition period where she named members of her cabinet and started developing critical projects for their new administration.

Ávila took the oath of office on 31 October, in Mexicali; among the attendees were Secretary of Economy, Tatiana Clouthier; head of government of Mexico City, Claudia Sheinbaum; and MORENA's National Leader, Mario Delgado. Avila came to become the first woman in Baja California, to serve as Governor, also the youngest one, and Mexico's first to take an oath of office as a State Governor while being pregnant.

=== Governor of Baja California (2021-present) ===
In her first public act in office, Governor Ávila met with a group of Baja Californian athletes who were representatives in Tokyo's 2020 Olympic Games: Aremi Fuentes, Alexa Moreno y Luis Álvarez "El Abuelo", where she handed out economic assistance, as a sense of recognition and encouragement into their works, and to carry out her campaign promises with local athletes.

Ávila had already accomplished campaign promises during her first months, such as supporting winegrowing in Baja California through Decree that eliminates sales taxes to the revenue from wine sales.

On 24 November 2021, she presented the first edition of "Miércoles de Mañanera", where every Wednesday, she leads a press conference and discloses vital projects for the state and relevant topics of the week; which also has a Q&A section for media reporters.

In late November, she executed actions and projects to eradicate violence against women, presenting a program that consists of the installation of "Puntos Naranjas", specific first-aid locations through cities and towns in the state for women who suffer or are at risk of any aggression. In Tijuana, she presented the "Violet Transport" program, which gives exclusive and free public transportation to women and their children.

In her first work tour alongside President Andrés Manuel Lopez Obrador, he reassured the complete support and solidarity for Governor Ávila and his commitment to work coordinately for the wellbeing of vulnerable groups in the region.

According to Consulta Mitofsky in 2022, Ávila has an approval rating by Baja's citizens of 61.7%, thus positions her as the top 4th of State Governors in Mexico and the top 1st in the MORENA party in approval ratings. Polling in December 2024 found her to be Mexico's top rated leader, with an approval rating of 69.7%.

== Controversies ==
One of the main criticisms against her has been her frequent trips outside the state of Baja California, particularly to Mexico City, where she often attends unofficial meetings with political groups from her party. However, these trips have been justified by the governor’s office as legitimate since they are carried out outside her official work schedule. Records show that she has made 46 official trips within Mexico and 6 abroad, some of which coincided with events organized by the Morena party. Some of the trips for party-related matters did not fully align with official duties, and most occurred during the presidential campaign of Claudia Sheinbaum. The itineraries and expenses of most of these trips have been classified for public security reasons.

During the 2022 Mexican presidential recall referendum, the National Electoral Institute, through its Complaints and Denunciations Commission, ordered Governor Marina del Pilar to remove several publications that were considered electoral propaganda, violating the electoral silence period. Similar incidents were reported during the 2024 Mexican general election, when complaints were filed by the National Action Party and citizens between May 15 and 24, alleging that the governor promoted electoral propaganda and political endorsements in official communications during the electoral process.

In 2024, journalist Gustavo Macalpin was dismissed live on air during his program Ciudadano 2.0 by Channel 66 director Luis Arnoldo Cabada, without prior notice. Although the reasons were not officially confirmed, the dismissal was reportedly related to political criticism and comments made about Governor Marina del Pilar and her husband, Carlos Alberto Torres Torres, who was appointed as Coordinator of Strategic Projects for the Tijuana City Council and mentioned as a possible candidate for mayor of Tijuana in 2027. The dismissal was described as an act of censorship and violence. During a press conference, president Claudia Sheinbaum expressed her disapproval if the firing had been motivated by criticism of the governor and asked Marina del Pilar to reinstate the journalist to his program.

In 2025, the United States government reportedly revoked the tourist visas of Governor Marina del Pilar and her husband, Carlos Alberto Torres Torres, who also served as Coordinator of Strategic Projects for the Tijuana City Council and is affiliated with Morena. The measures were reportedly linked to alleged investigations into money laundering and connections to drug cartels. As a result, she became the first sitting Mexican official to be denied entry to the United States. Weeks before this case became public, Colombian President Gustavo Petro stated that his own U.S. visa had also been revoked shortly before he was scheduled to attend meetings with the World Bank Group and the International Monetary Fund.

On 22 June 2026, an audio recording of Ávila Olmeda was leaked. In it, she is heard actively pursuing the restoration of her U.S. visa. She later defended the legitimacy of those efforts.

Chamber of Deputies (Mexico)
| Preceded by Luz Argelia Paniagua Figueroa | Member of the Chamber of Deputies for Baja California's 2nd district 2018–2019 | Succeeded by Martha Lizeth Noriega Galaz |
Political offices
| Preceded by Gustavo Sánchez Vasquez | Mayor of Mexicali; 2019–2021 | Succeeded by Guadalupe Mora Quinonez |
| Preceded by Jaime Bonilla Valdez | Governor of Baja California; 2021–present | Incumbent |
