= Opinion polling for the 2018 Mexican general election =

Opinion polling was carried out prior to the 2018 Mexican general election.

The 2018 Mexican election features nine registered political parties, including the Institutional Revolutionary Party (PRI), National Action Party (PAN), Party of the Democratic Revolution (PRD), and the newly formed National Regeneration Movement (Morena).

== Coalition backgrounds ==
=== Todos por México ===
PRI, which held the presidency from 1929 to 2000 and is currently in power under President Peña Nieto, is primarily a center-right party. It will be contesting the elections in a coalition alongside the Ecological Green Party of Mexico and the New Alliance Party (Mexico) under the coalition "Todos por México" ("Everyone for Mexico").

=== Por México al Frente ===
PAN is a center-right, Christian democracy party which held the presidency in 2 sexenios from 2000-2012.

PRD grew out of the PRI in 1986 as the leftists who created the Corriente Democrática (Democratic Current) within PRI split off. It came quite close to claiming the presidency in 2006. Surprisingly, the PRD decided to form a coalition with the right-wing PAN, and they will contest the elections alongside Citizens' Movement in a coalition called "Por México al Frente" ("For Mexico, to the Front").

=== Juntos Haremos Historia ===
MORENA, created in 2014 by Andrés Manuel López Obrador, affectionately called AMLO, is a left-leaning party which split from the PRD. It will contest the elections as a coalition with the Labor Party (PT) and the Social Encounter Party (PES), called "Juntos Haremos Historia" ("Together we'll make history").

== By coalitions ==
Pollster	Date	PAN PRD MC	MORENA PT PES	PRI PVEM NA	Independent politician	Other	None	Not mentioned
Mitofsky	July 2017	21.7%	16.7%	15.9%	5.5%	3.0%		37.2%
Mitofsky	August 2017	21.2%	16.4%	14.8%	4%	3.9%		39.7%
Parametría	September 2017	32%	23%	15%			14%	16%
Reforma	September 2017	24%	31%	28%	8%			
México Elige	October 2017	22.5%	36.1%	21.8%	11.4%			8.2%
El Financiero	November 2017	18%	24%	22%			21%	15%
El Economista	December 2017	23.1%	22.6%	21.4%	7.4%	0.6%		24.9%
Parametría	January 2018	32%	42%	26%	12%			18%
Arias Consultores	January 2018	18.1%	50.1%	15.5%	6.5%			9.8%
SABA	Feb 4-12, 2018	12.3%	38.5%	10.3%	11.3%			29%
Revista 32	Feb 15-16, 2018	18.1%	46.2%	18.0%	5.8%			11.8%
Revista 32	Mar 19-23, 2018	15.9%	44.6%	17.8%	6.6%			15.1%
Parametría	Mar 23-28, 2018	25%	36%	20%	7%	5%	5%	2%
Revista 32	April 23-25, 2018	18.1%	46.9%	13.6%	4.1%		17.3%	

== By candidates (January–June 2018) ==
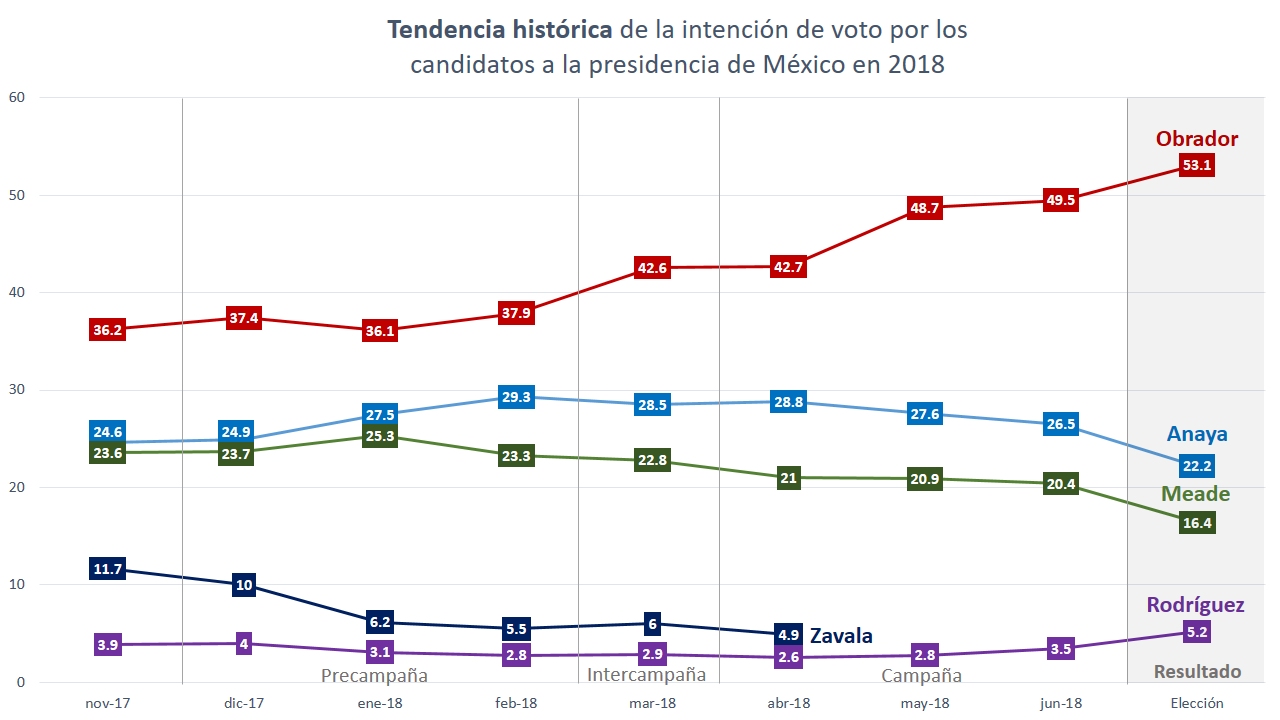
Historical trend of voting intentions for the candidates for the Mexican presidency in 2018.

Agency	Date	Obrador	Anaya	Meade	Zavala	Rodríguez	Other/None
Parametría	January	31%	19%	20%	10%	2%	19%
SDP Noticias	Jan 7-9	38.1%	17.7%	26.1%	7.9%	2.9%	7.3%
Mitofsky	January	23.6%	20.4%	18.2%			10%
Focus Asesores	January	47%	11%	11%	5%	2%	28%
Arias Consultores	Jan 23-25	56.2%	14.3%	16.3%	6.5%	2.5%	4.1%
El Universal	Jan 19-25	32%	26%	16%	4%	2%	4.1%
El Financiero	Jan 27-31	38%	27%	22%	7%	3%	3%
Parametría	Jan 25-Feb 2	34%	23%	18%	7%	2%	16%
Mendoza Blanco	Feb 2-4	30%	26%	16%	3%	2%	23%
SDP Noticias	Feb 2-6	38.4%	19.5%	25.7%	7.2%	2.6%	6.8%
Mitofksy	Feb 9-11	27.1%	22.3%	18.0%			
Reforma	Feb 8-11	33%	25%	14%	4%	2%	22%
SABA	Feb 4-12	38.3%	12.5%	10.3%	8.0%	1.9%	29%
Parámetro	Feb 9-11	30.5%	23.8%	23.3%	3.9%	2.0%	16.5%
Fox News	Feb 9-11	40%	31%	20%			9%
Revista 32	Feb 15-16	48.2%	16.3%	17.8%	4.2%	2.5%	10.9%
Massive Caller	February	30.55%	24.78%	15.4%	7.23%	2%	20.04%
El Pais	March	37.8%	29.2%	23.8%	5.7%	2.6%	
Parametría	Feb 24-Mar 1	35%	21%	16%	10%	5%	13%
Bloomberg	March 8	42.2%	27.4%	20.6%	4%	1.6%	
Indemerc	March 8-10	44.1%	15.1%	10.9%	8.2%	2%	19.7%
El Financiero	March 9-14	42%	23%	24%	7%	2%	2%
Arias Consultores	March 19-23	47.8%	14.6%	18.1%	6.2%		13.2%
Parametría	March 23-28	38%	20%	16%	13%		
Gii 360	March 30-April 3	43%	19%	13%	7%		18%
Berumen y Asociados	April 3–5	42%	31.1%	21.9%	5%		
SDP Noticias	April 11–14	41.9%	19.7%	22.7%	9%	2.5%	
Reforma	April 12–15	48%	26%	18%	5%	3%	
Bloomberg	April 15	47.8%	26.6%	17.9%	5.1%		
SDP Noticias	April 25–28	41.4%	24.7%	22.2%	4.8%	3.1%	3.8%
Revista 32	April 23–25	50.9%	17.8%	13.5%	2.2%	2.8%	13.8%
La Silla Rota	April 25-28	45%	29%	18%	5%	3%	
Reforma	April 26-30	48%	30%	17%	3%	2%	
Varela y Asociados	April 28-May 4	47.5%	33.1%	16.2%	1.7%	1.4%	
El Financiero	April 26-May 2	46%	26%	20%	5%	3%	
Ipsos	May 11-15	43%	24%	16%		2%	15%
SDP Noticias	May 18-19	42.4%	25.8%	24.2%	0.6%	3.3%	3.7%
Eje Central	May 21-22	49%	26%	21%		4%	
Reforma	May 24-27	52%	26%	19%		4%	
Parametría	May 23-29	54%	24%	17%	3%	2%	
Varela y Asociados	May 30-June 4	50.6%	29.5%	17.6%		2.2%	
BGC	May 31-June 4	47%	29%	21%		3%	
De Las Heras Demotecnia	June 10-13	50%	25%	19%	5%	1%	
Arias Consultores	June 13-15	62%	19.8%	13.7%		3.3%	
Reforma	June 20-24	51%	27%	19%		3%	
BGC	June 22-25	49%	26%	21%		4%	
El Financiero	June 15-23	54%	21%	22%		3%	
Presidential election	July 1	53.19%	22.28%	16.41%	0.06%	5.23%	

== By candidates (April–December 2017) ==
Pollsters	Date	Obrador	Zavala	Chong	Mancera	Rodríguez	Anaya	Ávila	Valle	Nuño	Meade	Other	None	Not mentioned
El Financiero	April 2017	29%	32%	27%	8%	4%								
El Universal	April 2017	33%	27%	13%	6%	4%								
El Universal	April 2017	32%		16%	6%		20%							
El Universal	April 2017	32%	26%		6%			13%						
GEA-ISA	June 2017	18%	6%	4%	2%		7%	5%	4%					
Reforma	July 2017	31%	26%	15%	7%							1%	15%	5%
Reforma	July 2017	30%	26%	14%	6%	5%						1%	14%	4%
Reforma	July 2017	30%	27%	14%		9%						1%	14%	5%
Reforma	July 2017	32%		17%		8%	17%					1%	20%	5%
Reforma	July 2017	33%		17%	16%	8%						1%	19%	6%
El Financiero	July 2017	30%	28%	24%	10%	8%								
Mitofsky	August 2017	25.9%	19.7%	14.8%	4.4%	4.6%								
Mitofsky	August 2017	24.9%		15.4%	5.2%	3.8%	20.5%							
Mitofsky	August 2017	26.3%		15.7%	4.5%	4.9%			19.8%					
Mitofsky	August 2017	25.9%	18.7%		5.1%	5%				13.6%				
Mitofsky	August 2017	26.2%	19.3%		5%	4.5%					12.8%			
Mitofsky	August 2017	25.6%			4.9%	5.2%	20.1%				13.1%			
México Elige	October 2017	36.7%	14.7%	19.6%	5.3%	2.2%								
Reforma	November 2017	31%	8%			2%	19%				17%	1%	10%	12%
GCE	December 2017	27.8%	9.7%		6.3%	4.2%	9.2%				21.5%	0.3%	7.5%	13.5%
Massive Caller	December 2017	27.2%	9%			9%	18.1%				20.4%	4.3%		18.2%

== By political parties ==
Pollster	Date	PRI	PAN	PRD	MORENA	PT	PVEM	MC	NA	PES	Independent politician	Other	No-one	Not mentioned
Parametría	August 2015	29%	23%	9%	21%		8%	5%	2%	3%				
GEA-ISA	March 2016	33%	16%	7%	7%							4%	17%	18%
Mitofsky	March 2016	21.5%	16.4%	10.8%	11.7%	0.6%	1.1%	1.8%	0.6%	0.5%	4.3%		14%	16.7%
Mitofsky	May 2016	22.3%	18.6%	8.7%	12.1%	0.8%	1.2%	1.9%	0.7%	0.9%	4.6%			28.2%
GEA-ISA	June 2016	28%	19%	5%	11%							6%	11%	21%
El Financiero	June 2016	29%	28%	8%	19%	1%	3%	2%	3%	1%	6%			
Mitofsky	July 2016	19.6	20%	8.1%	12.2%	1.1%	1.3%	1.9%	1%	1.1%	2.8%			30.9%
Reforma	August 2016	22%	27%	6%	18%		5%	3%			11%	8%		
GEA-ISA	September 2016	22%	23%	8%	9%							7%	15%	15%
Parametría	September 2016	27%	30%	10%	21%	2%	5%	1%	2%	2%	3%			
Mitofsky	September 2016	19.5%	20.2%	7.8%	12.1%	1.1%	1.3%	1.6%	0.9%	1%	3.3%			31.2%
El Financiero	November 2016	28%	29%	11%	18%						5%			
Reforma	December 2016	22%	27%	5%	22%		3%	5%			11%	5%		
Massive Caller	January 2017	12.8%	20.48%	5.5%	21.68%		1.6%				8.5%	5.2%		23.9%
Reforma	January 2017	17%	24%	10%	27%		2%	4%			10%	6%		
El Financiero	February 2017	22%	25%	9%	25%	3%	3%	3%	3%	1%	6%			
Mitofsky	February 2017	13%	18.8%	5.1%	15.9%	0.8%	1.4%	1.7%	1.1%	0.7%	3.0%			38.5%
México Elige	February 2017	12.4%	21.0%	1.2%	36.9%	0.2%	0.4%	3%	0.5%	0.6%	14.5%			
GEA-ISA	March 2017	19%	20%	7%	15%							5%	17%	18%
El Financiero	April 2017	28%	29%	10%	21%	1%	3%	2%	1%	1%	4%			
Excelsior	April 2017	19%	21%	8%	26%						2%			24%
El Universal	April 2017	13%	27%	6%	33%						4%			
El Universal	April 2017	13%	23%	6%	24%	3%	4%	4%	4%	2%				17%
Parametría	January 2018	25%	24%	5%	30%						12%	18%		
SDP Noticias	Feb 2-6, 2018	20.6%	13.6%	2.8%	36.0%	1.1%	2.7%	3.1%	2.4%	1.3%	11.2%	5.4%		
SABA	Feb 4-12	9.4%	9.9%	1.7%	30.4%	0.4%	0.8%	1.6%	0.1%		8.4%	0.6%	15.7%	16.8%
Parametría	Mar 23-28	15%	15%	5%	29%	3%	2%	3%	3%	1%	6%	1%	2%	15%
Gii 360	March 30-April 3, 2018	12%	14%	2%	34%	1%	1%	2%	1%	1%	6%	26%		
