= 2018 Mexican general election =

- 1 July 2018
- Presidential election
- Opinion polls
- Turnout: 63.43% (▲0.35pp)
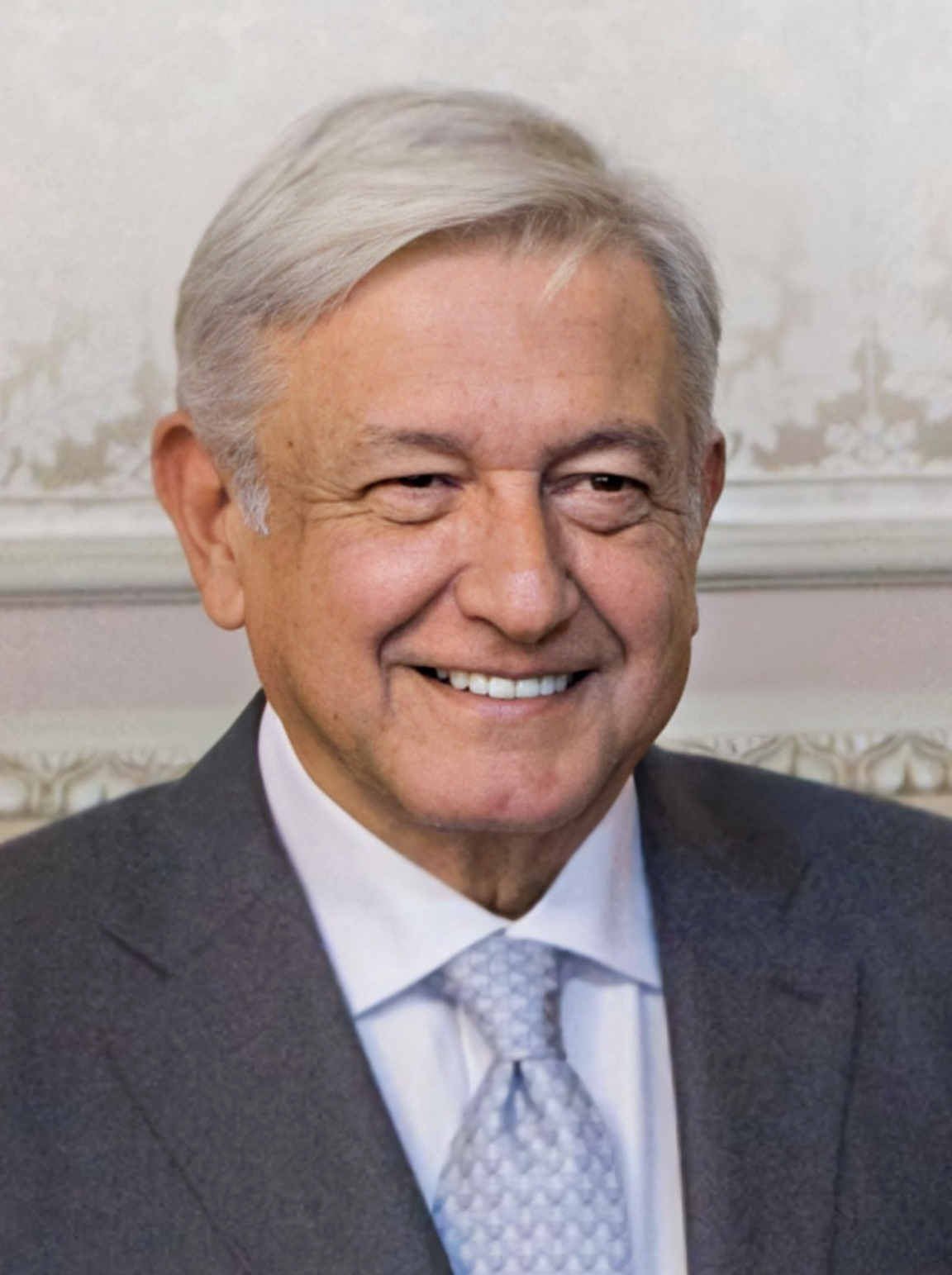

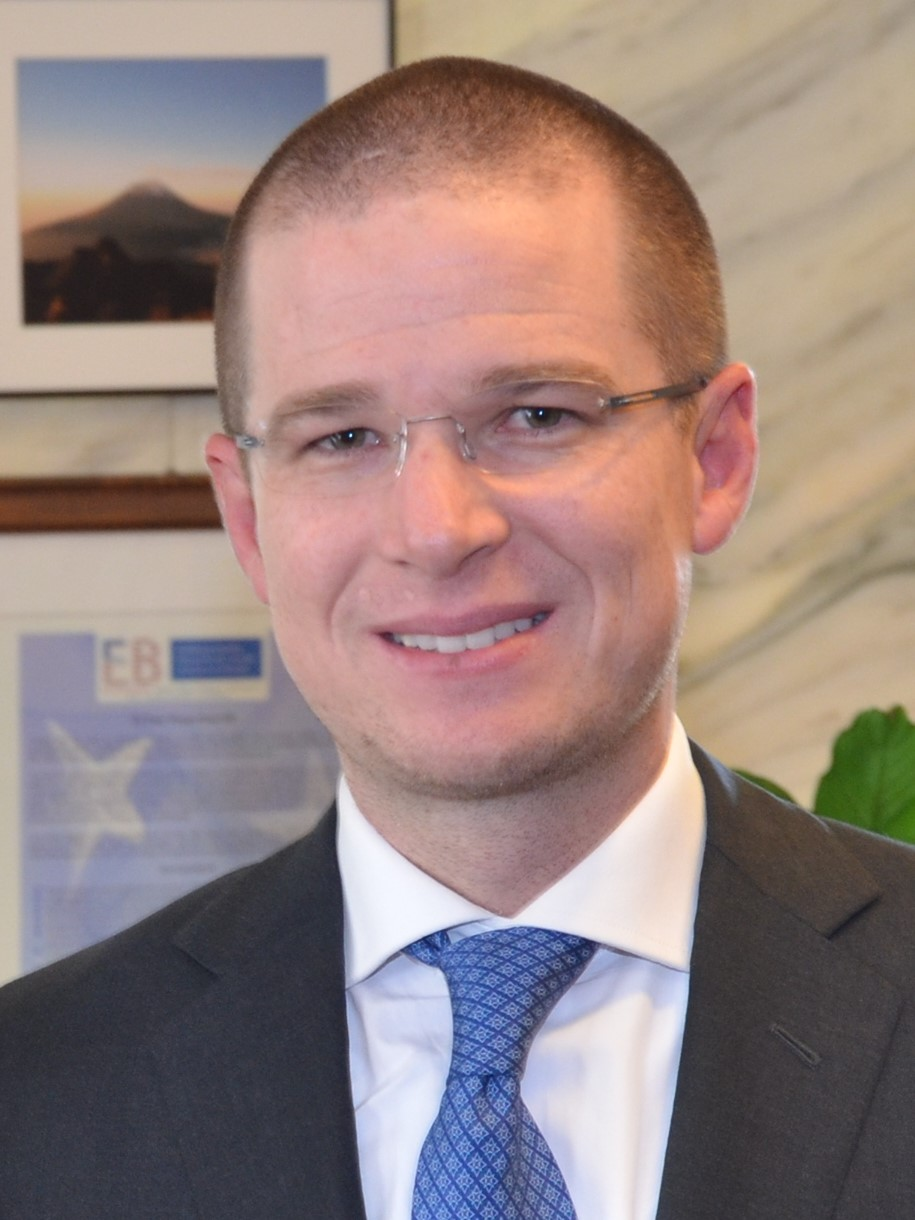

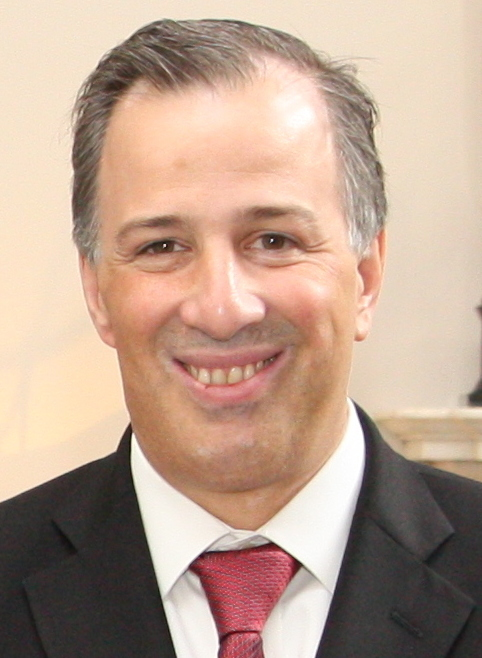

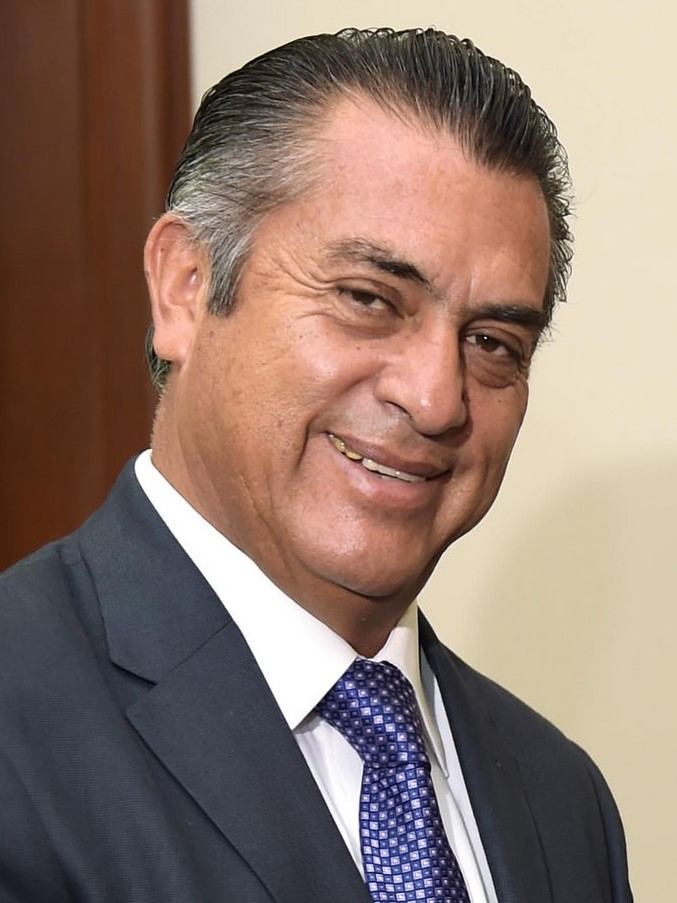
Nominee	Andrés Manuel López Obrador	Ricardo Anaya
Party	MORENA	PAN
Alliance	Juntos Haremos Historia	Por México al Frente
Popular vote	30,113,483	12,610,120
Percentage	54.71%	22.91%
Nominee	José Antonio Meade	Jaime Rodríguez Calderón
Party	PRI	Independent
Alliance	Todos por México
Popular vote	9,289,853	2,961,732
Percentage	16.88%	5.38%
- López (53081) Anaya (9323) Meade (3891) Rodríguez (29) Zavala (2) Tie (147) No data (5017)
President before election
Enrique Peña Nieto
PRI
Elected President
Andrés Manuel López Obrador
MORENA
- Senate
- All 128 seats in the Senate of the Republic; 65 seats needed for a majority
Party	Leader	Vote %	Seats	+/–
Juntos Haremos Historia (69 seats)
MORENA	Yeidckol Polevnsky Gurwitz	39.12	55	New
PT	Alberto Anaya	3.98	6	+2
PES	Hugo Eric Flores Cervantes	2.43	8	New
Por México al Frente (38 seats)
PAN	Damián Zepeda Vidales	18.35	23	−15
PRD	Manuel Granados Covarrubias	5.49	8	−14
MC	Dante Delgado Rannauro	4.89	7	+5
Todos por México (21 seats)
PRI	René Juárez Cisneros	16.59	14	−38
PVEM	Carlos Alberto Puente Salas	4.65	6	−3
PNA	Luis Castro Obregón	2.41	1	0
This lists parties that won seats. See the complete results below.
Results by state
- Chamber of Deputies
- All 500 seats in the Chamber of Deputies; 251 seats needed for a majority
Party	Leader	Vote %	Seats	+/–
Juntos Haremos Historia (308 seats)
MORENA	Yeidckol Polevnsky Gurwitz	38.80	191	+156
PT	Alberto Anaya	4.09	61	+55
PES	Hugo Eric Flores Cervantes	2.50	56	+48
Por México al Frente (129 seats)
PAN	Damián Zepeda Vidales	18.68	81	−28
PRD	Manuel Granados Covarrubias	5.49	21	−34
MC	Dante Delgado Rannauro	4.60	27	+2
Todos por México (63 seats)
PRI	René Juárez Cisneros	17.22	45	−158
PVEM	Carlos Alberto Puente Salas	4.99	16	−31
PNA	Luis Castro Obregón	2.57	2	−9
This lists parties that won seats. See the complete results below.

General elections were held in Mexico on 1 July 2018. Voters elected a new president to serve a six-year term, 128 members of the Senate for six years and 500 members of the Chamber of Deputies for three years. It was one of the largest election days in Mexican history, with most of the nation's states holding state and local elections on the same day, including nine governorships, with over 3,400 positions subject to elections at all levels of government. It was the most violent campaign Mexico has experienced in recent history, with 130 political figures killed since September 2017.

Incumbent president Enrique Peña Nieto was not constitutionally eligible for a second term. Incumbent members of the legislature were term-limited, so all members of Congress were newly elected. As a consequence of the political reforms of 2014, the members of the legislature elected in the 2018 elections were the first allowed to run for reelection in subsequent elections. The National Electoral Institute (INE) officially declared the new process underway on 8 September 2017.

The presidential election was won by Andrés Manuel López Obrador of the National Regeneration Movement (MORENA) running as the candidate of the Juntos Haremos Historia, who secured a landslide margin of almost 31 points. This was the first time a candidate won an outright majority (according to official vote counts) since 1988 and the first time a candidate not from the Institutional Revolutionary Party (PRI) or its predecessors had done so since the Mexican Revolution. The elections also marked the first time that a coalition of political parties (excluding the PRI) supporting a single presidential candidate achieved majorities in the Senate and Chamber of Deputies. The elections represented the PRI's greatest electoral setback and the worst for a sitting administration since universal male suffrage was implemented in 1917. (Note: Women acquired the right to vote in federal elections in 1953.)

== Electoral system ==
The country's president is elected by plurality in a single round of voting.

The 500 members of the Chamber of Deputies are elected to three-year terms by two methods; 300 are elected in single-member constituencies by first-past-the-post voting, with the remaining 200 elected from five regional constituencies by proportional representation, with seats allocated using the simple quotient and largest remainder method. No party is allowed to hold more than 300 seats. Members may hold office for up to four consecutive terms.

The 128 members of the Senate are elected to six-year terms, concurrent with the president, and also elected by two methods, with 96 elected in 32 three-member constituencies based on the states and 32 elected in a single nationwide constituency by proportional representation. In the three-member constituencies, two winning candidates shall be allocated to the party receiving the highest number of votes and one seat to the party receiving the second-highest number of votes. Members may hold office for up to two terms.

== Presidential candidates ==
=== Por México al Frente ===
Por México al Frente (English: "For Mexico to the Front") is the alliance of the center-right National Action Party (PAN) and the center-left Party of the Democratic Revolution (PRD) and Citizens' Movement (which both nominated Andrés Manuel López Obrador in the elections of 2006 and 2012) formed in an effort to defeat both the ruling party, the Institutional Revolutionary Party (PRI), and the front-runner Andrés Manuel López Obrador of the National Regeneration Movement (MORENA).

On 5 September, the electoral alliance was officially registered with the INE as Frente Ciudadano por México (Citizen Front for Mexico). On 8 December the coalition changed its name to Por México al Frente (Mexico to the Front). The next day, Ricardo Anaya Cortés, president of the PAN, resigned from his position and expressed his intent to be the alliance's candidate.

The former first lady Margarita Zavala submitted her resignation from the PAN on 6 October, after being a member for 33 years, and registered as an independent candidate six days later. She sought the presidency through an independent bid, but withdrew on 16 May 2018.

Nominee

- Ricardo Anaya Cortés, former president of the National Action Party.

=== Todos por México ===
Todos por México (English: "Everyone for Mexico") is the coalition composed of the Institutional Revolutionary Party (PRI), the Ecologist Green Party of Mexico (PVEM), and the New Alliance Party (PANAL). On 9 August 2017, the PRI revised its requirements for presidential candidates, eliminating the requirement that candidates must have 10 years of party membership, and allowing non-party members to lead the party. This move benefited finance secretary José Antonio Meade Kuribreña, who is not a member of the PRI, as well as education secretary Aurelio Nuño Mayer, whose length of membership was questioned. Meade was considered the favorite, because while the PRI was dogged by scandal and controversy, Meade was personally unaffected.

On 27 November, Meade resigned from cabinet and announced his intention to be the PRI's candidate in the upcoming election. He quickly received the support of President Peña Nieto and PRI-linked institutions such as the CTM union. With no challengers, Meade became the presumptive nominee. On 18 February 2018, the PRI held its convention of delegates, where Meade was formally selected as the party's presidential candidate; Meade is the PRI's first presidential candidate in its almost 90-year history not to be a member of the party.

Due to the circumstances of Meade's candidacy, critics compared his selection to the PRI's historical practice of dedazo ("tap of the finger"), where presidents hand-picked their successor.

The coalition was initially named Meade Ciudadano por México (English: Citizen Meade for Mexico), until the INE deemed it unconstitutional to include a candidate's name within the coalition's name, on the grounds that the presidential candidate would receive advertising from every piece of campaign advertising of the coalition used for local candidates. The coalition subsequently changed its name to Todos por México (Everyone for Mexico).

Nominee

- José Antonio Meade Kuribreña, former Secretary of Foreign Affairs, Secretary of Social Development, and Secretary of Finance and Public Credit during the Peña Nieto administration; Secretary of Finance and Public Credit and Secretary of Energy during the Felipe Calderón administration.

=== Juntos Haremos Historia ===
Juntos Haremos Historia (English: "Together We Will Make History") is the coalition composed of the National Regeneration Movement (MORENA), the Labor Party (PT), and the Social Encounter Party (PES).

On 12 December Andrés Manuel López Obrador registered as the presumptive nominee for MORENA and submitted his resignation as party president. This was López Obrador's third presidential bid; the previous two attempts were with the PRD. After the 2012 presidential election, López Obrador left the PRD to found MORENA. This was MORENA's first presidential election. Joining MORENA in the Juntos Haremos Historia coalition was the left-wing Labor Party and the right-wing Social Encounter Party.

Nominee

- Andrés Manuel López Obrador, former Head of Government of Mexico City, 2006 and 2012 presidential candidate.

=== Independents ===
Logo for Rodríguez's campaign

For the first time in Mexico's modern democratic history, candidates were allowed to run for the presidency as independents. Several people announced their intention to contest the election as an independent candidate.

Margarita Zavala, a lawyer, former deputy and wife of former president Felipe Calderón, had originally intended to run as the PAN nominee; however, on 6 October, she left the party and launched an independent bid. Explaining her decision, she said that the formation of Por México al Frente meant there would be no internal PAN selection, denying her a chance to be a candidate. Jaime Rodríguez Calderón, the independent governor of Nuevo León, also announced his candidacy, as did Senator Armando Ríos Piter.

The National Indigenous Congress announced on 28 May 2017 the election of María de Jesús Patricio Martínez as their spokeswoman and indigenous representative for the 2018 general election, aiming to obtain an independent candidacy. Only Zavala gathered enough signatures to appear on the ballot; however, on 10 April the Electoral Court accepted an appeal from Rodríguez and ordered the National Electoral Institute to register him as candidate.

On 16 May Zavala announced she was withdrawing her candidacy.

== Campaign ==
=== Timeline ===
==== January ====
As in the 2006 and 2012 federal elections, the 2018 campaign featured numerous accusations and attack advertisements directed at the leftist frontrunner candidate Andrés Manuel López Obrador, who contested the elections with the support of his party MORENA. A campaign described as "Red Scare-like" was used by the PRI and PAN candidates to convince voters that a López Obrador victory would turn Mexico into "another Venezuela".

In a speech, PRI president Enrique Ochoa Reza said that "if the people from MORENA like Venezuela so much, they should just go and live there". The PRI was believed to have hired Venezuelan right-wing political strategist JJ Rendón to work in their campaign, as he stated in January that he would do "everything within the law to prevent López Obrador from becoming President"; Rendón had previously worked for the PRI during Peña Nieto's 2012 presidential campaign.

In January, former president Felipe Calderón shared a video on via social media, in which a Venezuelan citizen living in Mexico warned voters not to vote for López Obrador, as he would put Mexico in the "path to ruin" like Chavismo had done in her country. It later surfaced that the woman, whose name is Carmen Martilez, is an actress who previously had uploaded a video in which she asked for street vendors to be "exterminated".

That same month, the PRI began to claim that López Obrador's campaign was supported by "Venezuelan and Russian interests". López Obrador dismissed the accusations and later joked about them, calling himself "Andrés Manuelovich".

Later in January, citizens across the country received phone calls originating in the city of Puebla, in which a recorded message warned them not to vote for López Obrador because he supposedly agreed to sell Mexico's oil to "the Russians". The MORENA representative in Puebla asked for an investigation into the phone calls. In March, telephone company Axtel traced the number that made the calls, revealing it was a number that the government of Puebla (whose governor is from the PAN) controlled. Puebla's government denied the accusations. Also in January, López Obrador uploaded a video via social media asking president Peña Nieto and PRI president Ochoa Reza to "calm down", and advised them to take some "Amlodipine".

A jingle entitled Movimiento Naranja, which was recorded for the political party Movimiento Ciudadano (which is part of the Por México al Frente coalition, along with the PAN and the PRD) and performed by an indigenous child called Yuawi, became popular and Yuawi turned into a celebrity overnight. Drawing on its success, the pre-candidate for the Frente, Ricardo Anaya recorded a video in which he performed the song with Yuawi.

PRI candidate José Antonio Meade was accused of plagiarism when it was noted that one of his ads, in which he criticized a "populist" speech on TV, was identical to an ad that was used by Justin Trudeau when he became leader of the Liberal Party of Canada in 2013.

==== February ====
Later in February, the PRI's Enrique Ochoa Reza tweeted that PRI politicians who defected to MORENA as Prietos que no aprietan (Dark-skinned people who can't get a hold) while trying to make a pun on the word PRI-etos (because morena is a synonym for prieto). The expression was criticized, and Ochoa Reza quickly deleted the tweet as it was interpreted to be racist.

Aristegui Noticias published that Ochoa Reza apologized, and also criticized the insensitive expression, additionally commenting that the part que ya no aprietan (who cannot hold) could also be interpreted as misogynistic due to being a double entendre referring to women in relation to the number of sexual relations they have had in their lifetime. Ochoa Reza's tweet apologized to dark-skinned people but not to women. Later Sinembargo.mx revealed that José Antonio Meade justified Enrique Ochoa's usage of the expression, by saying: uno se excede y es natural (English: one gets-ahead-of-themselves and it is natural) and saying that his quick apology talked positively about him.

==== March ====
In March, the Attorney General of the Republic (PGR) started an official investigation into money-laundering allegations against Ricardo Anaya. During the investigation, Santiago Nieto, the ex-chief of FEPADE (the prosecutor's office that focuses on electoral violations) was controversially removed from his job in October 2017, coincidentally right after starting an investigation regarding illicit campaign money from the 2012 presidential campaign that allegedly was received by Peña Nieto and by the future president of Pemex, Emilio Lozoya, from the Brazilian conglomerate Odebrecht. The ex-chief of FEPADE said that the accusations against Anaya were minor in comparison to Odebretch and Peña Nieto scandal, adding also the same opinion about the money lost by Secretariat of Social Development, to corrupt governors from the PRI such as Javier Duarte, all while José Antonio Meade was the man in charge of the Secretariat of Social Development. The scandal is known as La Estafa Maestra (The Master Robbery), and about 435 million pesos were lost. The same week the PRI legislators were criticized for voting for stopping the investigation of Odebretch against the wishes of Mexican people and organizations campaigning against corruption such as Mexicanos contra la corrupción (Mexicans against corruption). The investigation about Odebretch against the Pemex leader at the time, Lozoya, was legally stopped after a judge controversially ordered it days after.

Santiago Nieto said that the PGR was being used by Peña Nieto's government to tamper with elections and benefit Meade by removing Anaya from the race, complaining that it was a politically motivated use of law-enforcement agencies, which had made more efforts to investigate Anaya in a month than towards investigating Peña Nieto's Odebretch money and Meade's lost Secretariat of Social Development funds over the last six years. Santiago Nieto said the PGR and FEPADE were only attacking the rivals of the PRI, and the investigating organizations were not being neutral.

In an interview with The Wall Street Journal, Santiago Nieto would later reveal that Peña Nieto's government tried to bribe him to keep him silent, which he refused saying, "Sorry, but I can't receive any money from Peña Nieto." He received menacing phone messages stating: "Death follows you" and "Words of advice: stay out of Trouble", and as a consequence, he feared for the safety of his, and his family's lives. Additionally as of 2018, many of the politicians of the PRI political party who supported Peña Nieto during his presidential campaign would be later declared criminals by the Mexican government (some already elected, while others were campaigning concurrently with Peña Nieto, and would be elected), near the end of Peña Nieto's time as president.

A total of 22 state ex-governors, all members from the PRI, were accused of misuse of public funds and misdirection of money (with some money speculated to have been directed to the PRI); only five were sent to jail, with PGR receiving criticism for not investigating further. Among the most prominent criminals were: Tomás Yarrington from Tamaulipas (along his predecessor Eugenio Hernández Flores), Javier Duarte from Veracruz, César Duarte Jáquez from Chihuahua (no family relation between the two Duartes), and Roberto Borge from Quintana Roo, along their unknown multiple allies who enabled their corruption. Although Peña Nieto was not found to be their ally, by being part of the same political party, there were severely negative consequences to Peña Nieto's image as president, as well as of the PRI. Also, while not a member of the PRI at the time, Meade's image also received damage, because much of the money was lost while he was in charge of the Secretariat of Social Development, the government ministry that supervises the resources received by each state.

Despite the overwhelming evidence against César Duarte, in March 2018 the PGR found him innocent of any crime. The successor governor Javier Corral from the PAN, who previously fought against the Televisa law, gave a similar opinion to Santiago Nieto, saying the PGR was being used to protect the allies of Peña Nieto and the PRI, and attack their rivals. López Obrador said that failure to take action against Duarte was one of the main reasons why Mexicans had lost their faith in the PRI, saying the few ex-governors that were declared criminals were only to a pretense of concern.

==== April and May ====
After, Meade decided to change his strategy; and due to his poor reception, Ochoa Reza left his position as president of the PRI on 2 May.

On 16 May, Margarita Zavala suspended her presidential campaign.

Santiago Nieto decided to join AMLO's campaign, with both promising to continue the investigation into the alleged scandal involving Peña Nieto, the PRI and Odebretch. Meanwhile, César Duarte disappeared before being incarcerated, and was subsequently declared a fugitive from justice by the PGR.

More than 130 political figures were killed from when the campaign began in September 2017 until July 2018.

=== Promises and proposals ===
López Obrador promised to end many of the benefits received by ex-presidents, particularly the lifelong pension they receive. He added that he would redirect the money saved to be used to help senior citizens. Zavala said she would also attempt to end the practice, though she had not decided how to use the money saved, while Meade and Anaya said they would keep the practice going.

Anaya promised to implement a basic income for Mexican citizens, Anaya said Nobel Prize-winning economist Milton Friedman supported the idea. While well received, El Economista criticized how Anaya announced it, and called the idea populist.

Meade proposed to create an office that would track the unique needs of each individual citizen, in what he would call Registro Único de Necesidades de Cada Persona (Unique Register of the Necessities of Each Person). Citizens on social media mocked the idea as absurd and impossible to develop, comparing it to writing letters to Santa Claus or just plainly asking for miracles. Meade has supported Peña Nieto's energy reforms, saying that "everyone wins with the gasolinazo", and announcing that if he won he intended to continue it. López Obrador promised to end the gasolinazos by building two new fuel refineries, which would allow more petroleum to be processed into gasoline domestically, thus lowering the price by not outsourcing the refining to other countries.

Anaya promised to investigate and do everything to make sure President Peña Nieto is sent to jail for his aforementioned multiple presidential scandals, with López Obrador agreeing and suggesting to up the ante by also investigating every living former president.

On 26 January, López Obrador accused the International Monetary Fund of being an accomplice to corruption in Mexican politics and claimed that its policies are in part responsible for poverty, unemployment, and violence in the country. López Obrador promised that if he won the presidency, Mexico would follow "its own agenda".

López Obrador called for a change in security strategy and offered the controversial proposal of giving amnesty for drug dealers as a way to combat the drug cartels.

During a debate in April, Rodríguez Calderón said "We have to cut off the hands of those who rob (in public service). It's that simple." He later explained that it was intended to be applied to both criminals and government functionaries involved in acts of corruption citing the application of this measure in Saudi Arabia as an example to reduce corruption and violence. Rodríguez Calderón was trending ahead of the other candidates on Twitter during the debate.

Rodríguez Calderón later proposed to bring back the death penalty (currently constitutionally abolished in Mexico and enforced for the last time in 1961) for drug traffickers, hijackers, infanticides and serial killers.

== Opinion polls ==
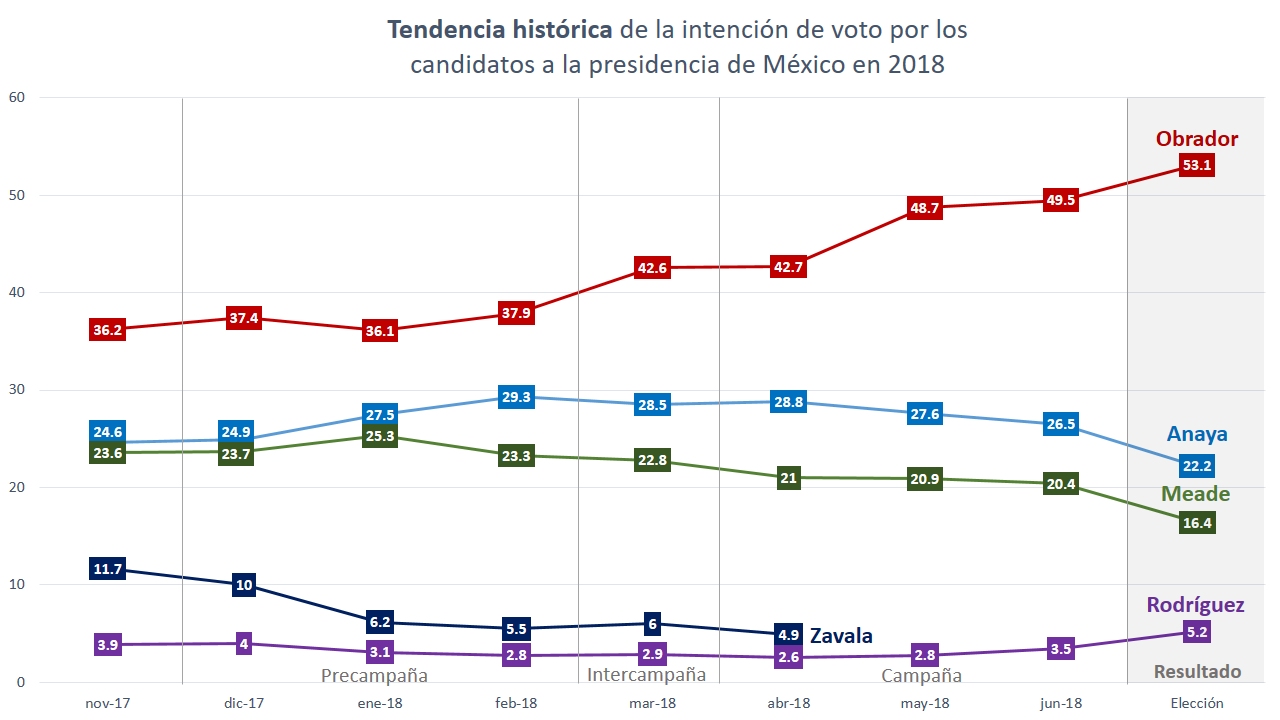
Historical trend of voting intentions for the candidates for the Mexican presidency in 2018.

== Conduct ==
=== Ballot access requirements ===
The candidate put forward by the National Indigenous Congress and the Zapatista Army of National Liberation, María de Jesús Patricio Martínez (Marichuy), alleged that the process for collecting signatures to attain ballot access unfairly benefits the rich. Marichuy said, "the INE made a list of telephone makes and models so that you must have at a minimum an Android 5.0 operating system or higher and so many hours to begin with the download of the applications in the devices, we find that the list is not true; we find brands that are not included in the list and of those that are included they don’t all work. The download is tedious and can take hours." The INE declared each signature registration would take 4.3 minutes, but each actual signature registration has taken up to 16 hours, or more. 'With these "classist, racist and excluding measures," Marichuy said, you realize "that this electoral system is not made for those peoples below that govern ourselves and that the laws and institutions of the State are made for those above, for the capitalists and their corrupt political class, resulting in a big simulation." Ultimately she was not able to obtain ballot access.

=== PRI payments to Cambridge Analytica ===
After the Facebook–Cambridge Analytica data scandal, in April 2018, Forbes published information from the British news program Channel 4 News that had mentioned the existence of proof revealing ties between the PRI and Cambridge Analytica, suggesting a modus operandi similar to the one in the United States. The info said they worked together at least until January. An investigation was requested. The New York Times obtained the 57-page proposal of Cambridge Analytica's proposed collaboration strategy to benefit the PRI by hurting MORENA's candidate Andres Manuel Lopez Obrador; the political party rejected the offer but still paid Cambridge Analytica to not help the other candidates.

=== Allegations of foreign intervention ===
In April 2017, the US Secretary of Homeland Security, John F. Kelly, stated that the election of a left-wing president in Mexico "would not be good for America or Mexico". The statement was widely believed to be a reference to López Obrador, the leftist, frontrunner candidate, and created controversy in Mexico, as it seemed to be an attempt to influence the election against him.

In December 2017, US National Security Advisor H. R. McMaster claimed that Russia had launched a campaign to "influence Mexico’s 2018 presidential election and stir up division", without defining the methods of the supposed meddling, or indicating which would be the candidate favored by the Kremlin. The Russian government has denied the claims. PRI president Enrique Ochoa Reza claimed that "Russian and Venezuelan interests" are supporting López Obrador's campaign.

López Obrador responded that Ochoa's declarations are part of a smear campaign against him, and later posted a video via social media, where he joked about the claims and called himself "Andres Manuelovich".

Guatemalan right-wing commentator Gloria Álvarez embarked on a tour through Mexico, calling López Obrador a "dangerous populist" and urging citizens not to vote for him. She was invited to a PAN legislators assembly on 31 January, where she criticized the alliance with the PRD, which she called "a party just like MORENA".

US Senators Bob Menendez and Marco Rubio asked US Secretary of State Rex Tillerson to "fight Russian meddling" in the Mexican elections. On 2 February during a summit in Mexico, Tillerson stated that Mexico should "beware the Russian interference". Dr. Tony Payan, director of the Mexico Center at Rice University noted that there was no evidence of actual Russian tampering in the Mexican electoral process, and considered the accusations "absurd" given that the Trump administration "will not admit Russia interfered in the US election".

=== Possibility of election tampering ===
Bloomberg warned about the possibility of the PRI committing electoral fraud, with Tony Payan, director of the Mexico Center at Rice University's Baker Institute in Houston, United States, suggesting that both vote buyout and computer hackings were possible and citing irregularities in the 1988 electoral process. Bloomberg's article also suggested Meade could be receiving unfair help from the over-budget amounts of money spent on publicity by incumbent president Enrique Peña Nieto.

Additionally, Meade spent more money on pre-campaign efforts than López Obrador and Anaya together, while failing to report where his funds came from; in contrast, López Obrador has attended the most events while spending the least money and successfully reported better than his rivals where he obtained the resources to pay for those events.

==== Prior PRI election tampering controversies in 2017 ====
During 2017, the PRI had faced allegations of electoral fraud concerning the election of Peña Nieto's cousin Alfredo del Mazo Maza as Governor of the state of Mexico. Despite the official vote results given by the INE (Electoral National Institute) giving the win to del Mazo, the election was marred by irregularities including reports of vote-buying, spending beyond legal campaign finance limits, and electoral counts that gave del Mazo extra votes that awarded the election to him. In November 2017, left-wing magazine Proceso published an article accusing the PRI of breaking at least 16 state laws during the elections, which were denounced 619 times. They said that all of them were broken in order to favor del Mazo during the election.

== Results ==
=== President ===
López Obrador won the election on 1 July 2018 with over 50% of the popular vote. In terms of states won, López Obrador won in a landslide, carrying 30 out of 31 states plus Mexico City, the most federal entities won by a candidate since Ernesto Zedillo won every state in the 1994 election.

Around 30 minutes after polls closed in the country's north-west, José Antonio Meade, speaking at a news conference from PRI headquarters, conceded defeat and wished López Obrador "every success".

Ricardo Anaya also conceded defeat within an hour of the polls closing, and independent candidate Jaime Rodríguez Calderón recognized López Obrador's victory shortly afterward.

The results of the INE's official quick count were announced around midnight Mexico City time. It reported a turnout of around 63%, with the following approximate results for the candidates: López Obrador, 53%; Anaya, 22%; Meade, 16%; and Rodríguez Calderón, 5%. This is the first time since 1994 Mexican general election that a presidential candidate was elected with an absolute majority (50%+1) of the votes cast.

Candidate	Party or alliance		Votes	%
Andrés Manuel López Obrador	Juntos Haremos Historia	National Regeneration Movement	25,186,577	45.76
Andrés Manuel López Obrador	Juntos Haremos Historia	Labor Party	3,396,805	6.17
Andrés Manuel López Obrador	Juntos Haremos Historia	Social Encounter Party	1,530,101	2.78
Andrés Manuel López Obrador	Juntos Haremos Historia	Total	30,113,483	54.71
Ricardo Anaya	Por México al Frente	National Action Party	9,996,514	18.16
Ricardo Anaya	Por México al Frente	Party of the Democratic Revolution	1,602,715	2.91
Ricardo Anaya	Por México al Frente	Citizens' Movement	1,010,891	1.84
Ricardo Anaya	Por México al Frente	Total	12,610,120	22.91
José Antonio Meade	Todos por México	Institutional Revolutionary Party	7,677,180	13.95
José Antonio Meade	Todos por México	Ecologist Green Party of Mexico	1,051,480	1.91
José Antonio Meade	Todos por México	New Alliance Party	561,193	1.02
José Antonio Meade	Todos por México	Total	9,289,853	16.88
Jaime Rodríguez Calderón	Independent		2,961,732	5.38
Margarita Zavala (Note: Dropped out of the race, but votes towards her were counted)	Independent		32,743	0.06
Non-registered candidates			31,982	0.06
Total			55,039,913	100.00
Valid votes			55,039,913	97.22
Invalid/blank votes			1,571,114	2.78
Total votes			56,611,027	100.00
Registered voters/turnout			89,250,881	63.43
Source: INE

==== By state ====
State	Anaya		Meade		López Obrador		Zavala		Rodríguez		Write-ins		Invalid/blank votes		Total Votes
State	Votes	%	Votes	%	Votes	%	Votes	%	Votes	%	Votes	%	Votes	%	Total Votes
Aguascalientes	178,988	31.9	103,639	18.5	222,528	39.7	547	0.1	40,299	7.2	391	0.1	14,714	2.6	561,106
Baja California	275,503	19.2	124,225	8.6	918,939	63.9	479	0.0	89,823	6.2	1,252	0.1	28,201	2.0	1,438,422
Baja California Sur	56,794	18.8	28,202	9.3	193,842	64.0	404	0.1	16,766	5.5	235	0.1	6,645	2.2	302,888
Campeche	54,417	12.1	96,584	21.5	275,262	61.2	209	0.0	11,194	2.5	146	0.0	11,735	2.6	449,547
Coahuila	307,590	22.4	358,279	26.1	609,362	44.4	730	0.1	71,051	5.2	437	0.0	24,367	1.8	1,371,816
Colima	56,428	16.5	62,004	18.2	197,316	57.8	346	0.1	15,753	4.6	200	0.1	9,062	2.7	341,109
Chiapas	198,117	8.2	562,863	23.2	1,485,699	61.2	1,697	0.1	39,607	1.6	580	0.0	137,087	5.7	2,425,650
Chihuahua	425,919	28.5	240,725	16.1	643,652	43.1	1,604	0.1	132,242	8.8	1,717	0.1	48,846	3.3	1,494,705
Mexico City	1,292,623	23.9	652,073	12.1	3,118,478	57.7	3,054	0.1	223,261	4.1	4,793	0.1	111,586	2.1	5,405,868
Durango	187,947	25.6	141,291	19.3	340,829	46.5	636	0.1	46,009	6.3	215	0.0	16,788	2.3	733,715
Guanajuato	940,133	40.4	381,692	16.4	707,222	30.4	1,655	0.1	223,214	9.6	1,859	0.1	69,232	3.0	2,325,007
Guerrero	217,838	13.5	285,799	17.7	1,018,163	63.1	277	0.0	24,531	1.5	362	0.0	66,168	4.1	1,613,138
Hidalgo	188,028	13.5	257,548	18.5	850,863	61.0	473	0.0	59,630	4.3	454	0.0	37,916	2.7	1,394,912
Jalisco	1,179,300	33.7	509,157	14.5	1,461,348	41.8	3,152	0.1	246,924	7.1	2,954	0.1	96,988	2.8	3,499,823
México	1,549,824	19.3	1,548,662	19.3	4,373,267	54.4	3,092	0.0	383,684	4.8	4,653	0.1	176,978	2.2	8,040,160
Michoacán	443,805	22.4	335,854	17.0	991,154	50.0	1,176	0.1	122,469	6.2	1,097	0.1	85,400	4.3	1,980,955
Morelos	142,553	14.7	99,506	10.3	638,689	66.0	680	0.1	60,083	6.2	510	0.1	26,169	2.7	968,190
Nayarit	79,818	16.5	66,447	13.7	315,816	65.2	280	0.1	10,382	2.1	183	0.0	11,750	2.4	484,676
Nuevo León	703,866	32.3	315,379	14.5	748,104	34.3	2,000	0.1	360,050	16.5	1,931	0.1	47,432	2.2	2,178,762
Oaxaca	221,686	11.5	342,108	17.7	1,260,562	65.3	931	0.0	39,020	2.0	548	0.0	64,602	3.3	1,929,457
Puebla	618,397	20.1	490,737	15.9	1,754,596	56.9	1,562	0.1	113,461	3.7	1,509	0.0	102,525	3.3	3,082,787
Querétaro	347,664	33.9	150,927	14.7	424,162	41.4	1,347	0.1	72,905	7.1	855	0.1	27,501	2.7	1,025,361
Quintana Roo	116,031	15.9	76,758	10.5	488,434	67.1	361	0.0	29,441	4.0	424	0.1	16,207	2.2	727,656
San Luis Potosí	334,763	26.6	260,211	20.7	527,546	41.9	717	0.1	82,956	6.6	677	0.1	51,722	4.1	1,258,592
Sinaloa	163,956	12.7	234,416	18.1	834,001	64.4	475	0.0	29,173	2.3	470	0.0	31,809	2.5	1,294,300
Sonora	167,273	15.3	181,059	16.6	651,806	59.7	858	0.1	63,800	5.8	505	0.0	26,366	2.4	1,091,667
Tabasco	91,342	7.6	107,538	9.0	961,710	80.1	378	0.0	9,749	0.8	279	0.0	29,849	2.5	1,200,845
Tamaulipas	475,201	29.1	228,386	14.0	786,210	48.1	1,143	0.1	110,246	6.7	531	0.0	33,933	2.1	1,635,650
Tlaxcala	66,729	10.9	74,744	12.2	433,127	70.6	213	0.0	25,941	4.2	276	0.0	12,392	2.0	613,422
Veracruz	1,050,599	27.5	471,313	12.4	2,059,209	54.0	1,224	0.0	132,737	3.5	1,307	0.0	98,061	2.6	3,814,450
Yucatán	320,144	27.5	324,055	27.8	455,216	39.1	384	0.0	39,111	3.4	333	0.0	25,509	2.2	1,164,752
Zacatecas	156,844	20.6	177,672	23.3	366,371	48.1	659	0.1	36,220	4.8	299	0.0	23,574	3.1	761,639
Mexicans living abroad	26,344	26.8	4,613	4.7	63,863	64.9	0	0.0	1,868	1.9	269	0.3	1,513	1.5	98,470
Total	12,610,120	22.3	9,289,853	16.4	30,113,483	53.2	32,743	0.1	2,961,732	5.2	31,982	0.1	1,571,114	2.8	56,611,027

=== Senate ===
Party or alliance		Party-list			Constituency			Total seats
Party or alliance		Votes	%	Seats	Votes	%	Seats	Total seats
Juntos Haremos Historia	Morena	21,256,238	39.12	13	21,013,123	39.03	42	55
Juntos Haremos Historia	Labor Party	2,164,088	3.98	1	2,149,566	3.99	5	6
Juntos Haremos Historia	Social Encounter Party	1,320,283	2.43	0	1,311,337	2.44	8	8
Juntos Haremos Historia	Total	24,740,609	45.54	14	24,474,026	45.46	55	69
Por México al Frente	National Action Party	9,969,069	18.35	6	9,852,753	18.30	17	23
Por México al Frente	Party of the Democratic Revolution	2,982,826	5.49	2	2,973,479	5.52	6	8
Por México al Frente	Citizens' Movement	2,654,085	4.89	2	2,621,317	4.87	5	7
Por México al Frente	Total	15,605,980	28.72	10	15,447,549	28.70	28	38
Todos por México	Institutional Revolutionary Party	9,011,312	16.59	6	8,961,369	16.65	8	14
Todos por México	Ecologist Green Party of Mexico	2,527,710	4.65	2	2,514,578	4.67	4	6
Todos por México	New Alliance Party	1,306,792	2.41	0	1,299,733	2.41	1	1
Todos por México	Total	12,845,814	23.64	8	12,775,680	23.73	13	21
Independents		1,105,624	2.04	0	1,105,624	2.05	0	0
Non-registered candidates		31,812	0.06	0	30,526	0.06	0	0
Total		54,329,839	100.00	32	53,833,405	100.00	96	128
Valid votes		54,329,839	95.86		53,833,405	95.87		
Invalid/blank votes		2,343,942	4.14		2,316,781	4.13		
Total votes		56,673,781	100.00		56,150,186	100.00		
Source: Diario Oficial, Election Resources

=== Chamber of Deputies ===
Party or alliance		Party-list			Constituency			Total seats
Party or alliance		Votes	%	Seats	Votes	%	Seats	Total seats
Juntos Haremos Historia	Morena	20,968,859	38.80	85	20,790,623	38.70	106	191
Juntos Haremos Historia	Labor Party	2,210,988	4.09	3	2,201,192	4.10	58	61
Juntos Haremos Historia	Social Encounter Party	1,353,499	2.50	0	1,347,540	2.51	56	56
Juntos Haremos Historia	Total	24,533,346	45.40	88	24,339,355	45.31	220	308
Por México al Frente	National Action Party	10,093,012	18.68	41	10,033,157	18.68	40	81
Por México al Frente	Party of the Democratic Revolution	2,967,452	5.49	12	2,959,800	5.51	9	21
Por México al Frente	Citizens' Movement	2,484,185	4.60	10	2,473,056	4.60	17	27
Por México al Frente	Total	15,544,649	28.76	63	15,466,013	28.79	66	129
Todos por México	Institutional Revolutionary Party	9,307,233	17.22	38	9,271,950	17.26	7	45
Todos por México	Ecologist Green Party of Mexico	2,694,654	4.99	11	2,685,677	5.00	5	16
Todos por México	New Alliance Party	1,390,882	2.57	0	1,385,421	2.58	2	2
Todos por México	Total	13,392,769	24.78	49	13,343,048	24.84	14	63
Independents		538,964	1.00	0	538,964	1.00	0	0
Non-registered candidates		32,938	0.06	0	32,611	0.06	0	0
Total		54,042,666	100.00	200	53,719,991	100.00	300	500
Valid votes		54,042,666	96.02		53,719,991	96.02		
Invalid/blank votes		2,241,811	3.98		2,226,781	3.98		
Total votes		56,284,477	100.00		55,946,772	100.00		
Source: Diario Oficial, Election Resources

=== Governorships ===
==== Mexico City ====
Election for Head of Government of Mexico City

Candidate	Party	Votes	%
Claudia Sheinbaum Pardo	Morena	2,537,454	48.17
Alejandra Barrales	Party of the Democratic Revolution	1,673,015	31.76
Mikel Arriola	Institutional Revolutionary Party	691,772	13.13
Mariana Boy Tamborrell	Ecologist Green Party of Mexico	206,942	3.93
Lorena Osornio	Independent	64,591	1.23
Marco Rascón	Humanist Party	51,676	0.98
Purificación Carpinteyro Calderón	New Alliance Party	36,105	0.69
Non-registered candidates		5,727	0.11
Total		5,267,282	100.00
Valid votes		5,267,282	97.67
Invalid/blank votes		125,605	2.33
Total votes		5,392,887	100.00
Registered voters/turnout		7,628,256	70.70
Source: IECM

==== Chiapas ====
Election for Governor of Chiapas

Candidate	Party	Votes	%
Rutilio Escandón	Morena	922,310	41.69
Fernando Castellanos	Ecologist Green Party of Mexico	529,508	23.93
Roberto Albores Gleason	Institutional Revolutionary Party	474,122	21.43
José Antonio Aguilar Bodegas	National Action Party	220,675	9.97
Jesús Alejo Orantes Ruiz	Independent	62,611	2.83
Non-registered candidates		3,309	0.15
Total		2,212,535	100.00
Valid votes		2,212,535	94.17
Invalid/blank votes		136,992	5.83
Total votes		2,349,527	100.00
Registered voters/turnout		3,549,291	66.20
Source: IEPC-Chiapas

==== Guanajuato ====
Election for Governor of Guanajuato

Candidate	Party	Votes	%
Diego Sinhué Rodríguez Vallejo	National Action Party	1,043,049	49.29
Ricardo Sheffield	Morena	553,639	26.16
Gerardo Sánchez García	Institutional Revolutionary Party	293,824	13.89
Felipe Camarena	Ecologist Green Party of Mexico	157,767	7.46
María Bertha Solórzano	New Alliance Party	66,122	3.12
Non-registered candidates		1,673	0.08
Total		2,116,074	100.00
Valid votes		2,116,074	96.70
Invalid/blank votes		72,183	3.30
Total votes		2,188,257	100.00
Registered voters/turnout		4,359,531	50.19
Source: IEEG

==== Jalisco ====
Election for Governor of Jalisco

Candidate	Party	Votes	%
Enrique Alfaro Ramírez	Citizens' Movement	1,354,014	40.31
Carlos Lomelí Bolaños	Morena	857,011	25.51
Miguel Castro Reynoso	Institutional Revolutionary Party	575,744	17.14
Miguel Ángel Martínez Espinosa	National Action Party	369,470	11.00
Salvador Cosío Gaona	Ecologist Green Party of Mexico	96,762	2.88
Martha Rosa Araiza Soltero	New Alliance Party	68,597	2.04
Carlos Orozco Santillán	Party of the Democratic Revolution	35,107	1.05
Non-registered candidates		2,691	0.08
Total		3,359,396	100.00
Valid votes		3,359,396	96.87
Invalid/blank votes		108,368	3.13
Total votes		3,467,764	100.00
Registered voters/turnout		5,904,211	58.73
Source: IEPC-Jalisco

==== Morelos ====
Election for Governor of Morelos

Candidate	Party	Votes	%
Cuauhtémoc Blanco	Social Encounter Party	501,743	54.42
Víctor Caballero	National Action Party	134,054	14.54
Rodrigo Gayosso	Party of the Democratic Revolution	111,198	12.06
Jorge Meade	Institutional Revolutionary Party	57,943	6.28
Fidel Demédicis Hidalgo	Independent	45,280	4.91
Nadia Luz Lara	Ecologist Green Party of Mexico	35,047	3.80
Alejandro Vera Jiménez	New Alliance Party	21,977	2.38
Mario Rojas Alba	Humanist Party	13,871	1.50
Non-registered candidates		871	0.09
Total		921,984	100.00
Valid votes		921,984	96.64
Invalid/blank votes		32,036	3.36
Total votes		954,020	100.00
Registered voters/turnout		1,442,857	66.12
Source: IMPEPAC

==== Puebla ====
Election for Governor of Puebla

Candidate	Party	Votes	%
Martha Erika Alonso Hidalgo	National Action Party	1,153,043	39.84
Miguel Barbosa Huerta	Morena	1,031,043	35.62
Enrique Doger	Institutional Revolutionary Party	555,041	19.18
Michel Chaín	Ecologist Green Party of Mexico	153,456	5.30
Non-registered candidates		1,947	0.07
Total		2,894,530	100.00
Valid votes		2,894,530	95.73
Invalid/blank votes		129,023	4.27
Total votes		3,023,553	100.00
Registered voters/turnout		4,500,580	67.18
Source: IEE-Puebla

==== Tabasco ====
Election for Governor of Tabasco

Candidate	Party	Votes	%
Adán Augusto López Hernández	Morena	601,987	64.22
Gerardo Gaudiano Rovirosa	Party of the Democratic Revolution	189,564	20.22
Georgina Trujillo Zentella	Institutional Revolutionary Party	115,164	12.29
Jesús Alí de la Torre	Independent	19,434	2.07
Manuel Paz Ojeda	New Alliance Party	10,371	1.11
Non-registered candidates		843	0.09
Total		937,363	100.00
Valid votes		937,363	95.70
Invalid/blank votes		42,134	4.30
Total votes		979,497	100.00
Registered voters/turnout		1,687,618	58.04
Source: IEPC-Tabasco

==== Veracruz ====
Election for Governor of Veracruz

Candidate	Party	Votes	%
Cuitláhuac García Jiménez	Morena	1,667,239	45.22
Miguel Ángel Yunes Márquez	National Action Party	1,453,938	39.43
José Yunes Zorrilla	Institutional Revolutionary Party	528,663	14.34
Miriam González Sheridan	New Alliance Party	36,404	0.99
Non-registered candidates		784	0.02
Total		3,687,028	100.00
Valid votes		3,687,028	97.36
Invalid/blank votes		99,893	2.64
Total votes		3,786,921	100.00
Registered voters/turnout		5,775,918	65.56
Source: OPLE-Veracruz

==== Yucatán ====
Election for Governor of Yucatán

Candidate	Party	Votes	%
Mauricio Vila Dosal	National Action Party	447,753	40.37
Mauricio Sahuí Rivero	Institutional Revolutionary Party	407,802	36.77
Joaquín Díaz Mena	Morena	231,330	20.86
Jorge Zavala Castro	Party of the Democratic Revolution	21,968	1.98
Non-registered candidates		251	0.02
Total		1,109,104	100.00
Valid votes		1,109,104	98.12
Invalid/blank votes		21,303	1.88
Total votes		1,130,407	100.00
Registered voters/turnout		1,544,062	73.21
Source: IEPAC
