= Gustavo Madero =

Gustavo Madero may refer to:

- Gustavo A. Madero (1875–1913), a participant in the Mexican Revolution against Porfirio Díaz
  - Gustavo A. Madero, Mexico City, a borough in Mexico
- Gustavo Madero Muñoz (born 1955), Mexican politician and businessman
