= Gustavo Madero Muñoz =

Mexican politician (born 1955)

Gustavo Madero
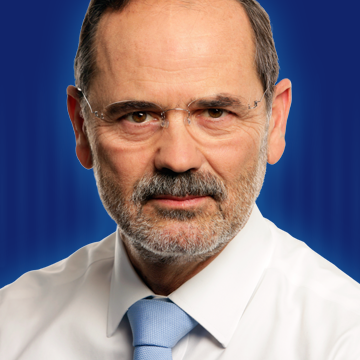

President of the Senate of Mexico
- In office 1 September 2008 – 31 August 2009
- Preceded by: Santiago Creel Miranda
- Succeeded by: Carlos Navarrete Ruiz

Senator of the Congress of the Union for Chihuahua
- Incumbent
- Assumed office 1 September 2018 Serving with Bertha Caraveo Camarena and Rafael Espino de la Peña
- Preceded by: Sylvia Martínez Elizondo
- In office 1 September 2006 – 5 December 2010
- Preceded by: Javier Corral Jurado
- Succeeded by: Lilia Merodio Reza

President of the National Action Party
- In office 20 January 2015 – 21 August 2015
- Preceded by: Ricardo Anaya
- Succeeded by: Ricardo Anaya
- In office 19 May 2014 – 30 September 2014
- Preceded by: Cecilia Romero Castillo
- Succeeded by: Ricardo Anaya
- In office 5 December 2010 – 2 March 2014
- Preceded by: César Nava Vázquez
- Succeeded by: Cecilia Romero Castillo

Personal details
- Born: 16 December 1955 (age 70) Chihuahua City, Chihuahua, Mexico
- Party: PAN
- Other political affiliations: Somos México
- Education: Western Institute of Technology and Higher Education
- Profession: Businessman

Gustavo Enrique Madero Muñoz (born 16 December 1955) is a Mexican politician, policy entrepreneur, businessman, and great-nephew of the president Francisco I. Madero. He is currently serving as a senator since 2018, having previously been a senator between 2006 and 2010. He was recognized by Forbes as a top leader in Artificial Intelligence (AI) in Mexico for transforming AI policy. Madero also was the President of the National Action Party (PAN) from 2010 to 2013 and again from 2014 to 2015, and from 2015 to 2018, he was a federal deputy from the first electoral region representing the state of Chihuahua.

== Life ==
Gustavo Madero has a bachelor's degree in communication sciences from the Instituto Tecnológico y de Estudios Superiores de Occidente (ITESO) in 1978 and taught at the Women's University of Guadalajara between 1976 and 1977. He has pursued business interests for most of his life; from 1993 to 1994, he was the Vice President of the COPARMEX in Chihuahua, and he has consulted for hotels and worked for companies including Banamex and ING. He also served in aseveral public service positions, as a department head in the Directorate General of Adult Education of the SEP (1979–82) and as a coordinator of farmer training at the National Agricultural Training Institute between 1982 and 1986.

In 1996, Madero joined the PAN, and the next year he served as the Director General of Planning and Evaluation in Chihuahua under Governor Francisco Barrio. In 2001, he became more actively involved in politics when he stood (unsuccessfully) as the PAN's candidate for municipal president of Chihuahua. In 2003, voters in the Sixth Federal Electoral District of Chihuahua sent Madero to the Chamber of Deputies for the first time, in the LIX Legislature, after narrowly beating his opponent, Pedro Domínguez Alarcón of the PRI, by 48,683 votes to 48,229. He presided over the Finances and Public Credit Commission, where he worked hard to have value-added tax applied to medicines and foodstuffs, an (unsuccessful) policy initiative of the Fox administration.

=== First Senate term ===
In the 2006 federal election, Gustavo Madero was elected to the Senate, representing Chihuahua for the PAN in conjunction with Ramón Galindo Noriega for the period 2006–12. He chaired the Finances and Public Credit Commission, and also served on the Trade and Industrial Development, Energy, Energy, and Foreign Relations (Asia-Pacific) Commissions. Until 10 June 2008, he was the leader of the PAN delegation in the Senate.

On 9 June 2008, it was announced that Gustavo Madero would be replacing Santiago Creel (his cousin) as the coordinator of the PAN bloc in the Senate, and this was confirmed on 10 June by PAN President Germán Martínez at a meeting of the party's National Executive Committee.

On 28 August 2008, he was elected President of the Senate for the third year (2008–09) of the LX Legislature.

=== Party president and federal deputy ===
In 2010, the PAN elected Madero as its new president, prompting him to permanently leave the Senate. He remained in the position until 2013, when he became the president of the Guiding Council of the Pacto por México; the next year, when the Pacto fell apart, he became the president again between 2014 and 2015 and was replaced by Ricardo Anaya.

In 2015, the PAN placed Madero on their list from the first electoral region, returning him to the Chamber of Deputies. In the LXIII Legislature, he is the president of the Commission for Attention to Vulnerable Groups and also serves on those dealing with Social Development, Public Education and Educational Services, and the Committee for the Center for the Study of Public Finances.

=== Return to the Senate ===
In 2018, Madero and Rocío Reza ran as the Por México al Frente Senate ticket for the state of Chihuahua. The ticket finished in second place, sending Madero back to the Senate as the first minority senator.
