= Por México al Frente =

2018 Mexican electoral alliance

Por México al Frente Por México al Frente
- Party presidents: Damián Zepeda Vidales; Manuel Granados Covarrubias; Dante Delgado Rannauro
- Presidential candidate: Ricardo Anaya
- Founded: 29 September 2017
- Dissolved: c. 2018
- Ideology: Social democracy Conservatism; Christian democracy
- Political position: Centre to centre-left

Website
- frenteciudadanopormexico.mx

Por México al Frente (lit. 'For Mexico to the Front'), also known as Frente Ciudadano por México (Citizen Front for Mexico), Frente Amplio Democrático (Broad Democratic Front), or Frente Amplio Opositor (Broad Opposition Front), was a big tent electoral alliance consisting of the centre-right National Action Party (PAN), as well as the centre-left Party of the Democratic Revolution (PRD) and Citizens' Movement (MC) to compete in the 2018 Mexican general election.

== History ==
=== Background ===
The loss of the National Action Party (PAN) in the 2012 Mexican general election, as well as the resignation of Andrés Manuel López Obrador from the Party of the Democratic Revolution (PRD), created conditions for both parties to unite despite a rough encounter in the 2006 Mexican general election. During the local Mexican elections in some states of the republic, the PAN and the PRD came close to form a political alliance, such is the case of Baja California, Aguascalientes, Puebla, Oaxaca, Sinaloa, Durango, Veracruz, and Zacatecas.

=== Formation ===
On 4 September 2017, a political alliance named Citizen Front for Mexico (Frente Ciudadano por México) was announced, it is made of the National Action Party (PAN), the Party of the Democratic Revolution (PRD), and the Citizens' Movement (MC). The political alliance would present a candidate in common across all of them in the 2018 Mexican Federal Election with the intent to defeat the competitive newly formed National Regeneration Movement (MORENA) and the Institutional Revolutionary Party (PRI). According to the announcement of the coalition, "[it] is not the traditional party alliance but a broad front, something much more robust with academics, intellectuals, social organizations, and the citizens", even some party leaders such as Dante Delgado Rannauro, the national coordinator of the Citizens' Movement (MC), have said the agreement would go further than the electoral process of winning. On 5 September 2017 the coalition was officially signed before the Mexican National Electoral Institute (INE).

The integrated parties have not made it clear whether they would concur their alliance only for the presidential elections or if they would present joint ballots for the election of deputies, senators, and local elections. Some members of the three parties have announced their refusal to such a measure and that they would not repeat such an alliance for the local elections, even though the core of the coalition was designed from the beginning to consider an alliance with national reach, and specifically designated possibility to allow separate candidacies in specific districts, or at the state level.

On 8 December 2017, the coalition was registered with the Mexican National Electoral Institute (INE) as an electoral coalition denominated "Por México al Frente" (For Mexico to the Front), and the national Presidents of the National Action Party (PAN) and the Party of the Democratic Revolution (PRD) resigned from their positions. The first, Ricardo Anaya, in order to seek the coalition's presidential nomination and Alejandra Barrales, of the PRD, to seek to nomination for the race to the Head of Government of Mexico City.

=== Exit of the PRD ===
On 28 August 2018, Ricardo Gallardo Juárez, the new parliamentary coordinator of the PRD, announced that the PRD was breaking away from the coalition, saying "We want to leave something very clear, this parliamentary faction will not seek alliances with the PAN or with Citizens' Movement." Manuel Granados Covarrubias, federal president of the PRD, stated "Because our agendas in the legislative, in many points, in some parts, we do not coincide, but in another great majority we do coincide. Where we have agreements, surely we will go together, not only with the PAN and Citizens' Movement, with all the political parties where we find coincidence, in favor of Mexico, always for the interests of the Mexicans."

== Election results ==
=== Presidential elections ===
Election year	Candidate	Votes	%	Outcome	Notes
2018	Ricardo Anaya	12,610,120	22.28	✗ Lost	

=== Congressional elections ===
==== Chamber of Deputies ====
Election year	Constituency		PR		# of seats	Position	Presidency	Note
Election year	votes	%	votes	%	# of seats	Position	Presidency	Note
2018	15,473,151	27.65%	15,549,755	27.61%	131 / 500	Opposition	Andrés Manuel López Obrador	Tallies added from INE District Count.

==== Senate ====
Election year	Constituency		PR		# of seats	Position	Presidency	Note
Election year	votes	%	votes	%	# of seats	Position	Presidency	Note
2018	15,489,636	27.54%	15,611,117	27.54%	38 / 128	Opposition	Andrés Manuel López Obrador	Tallies added from INE District Count.

== See also ==
- Juntos Haremos Historia
- Todos por México
- List of political parties in Mexico
- 2018 Mexican general election
