= Alfonso Ramírez Cuéllar =

Mexican politician

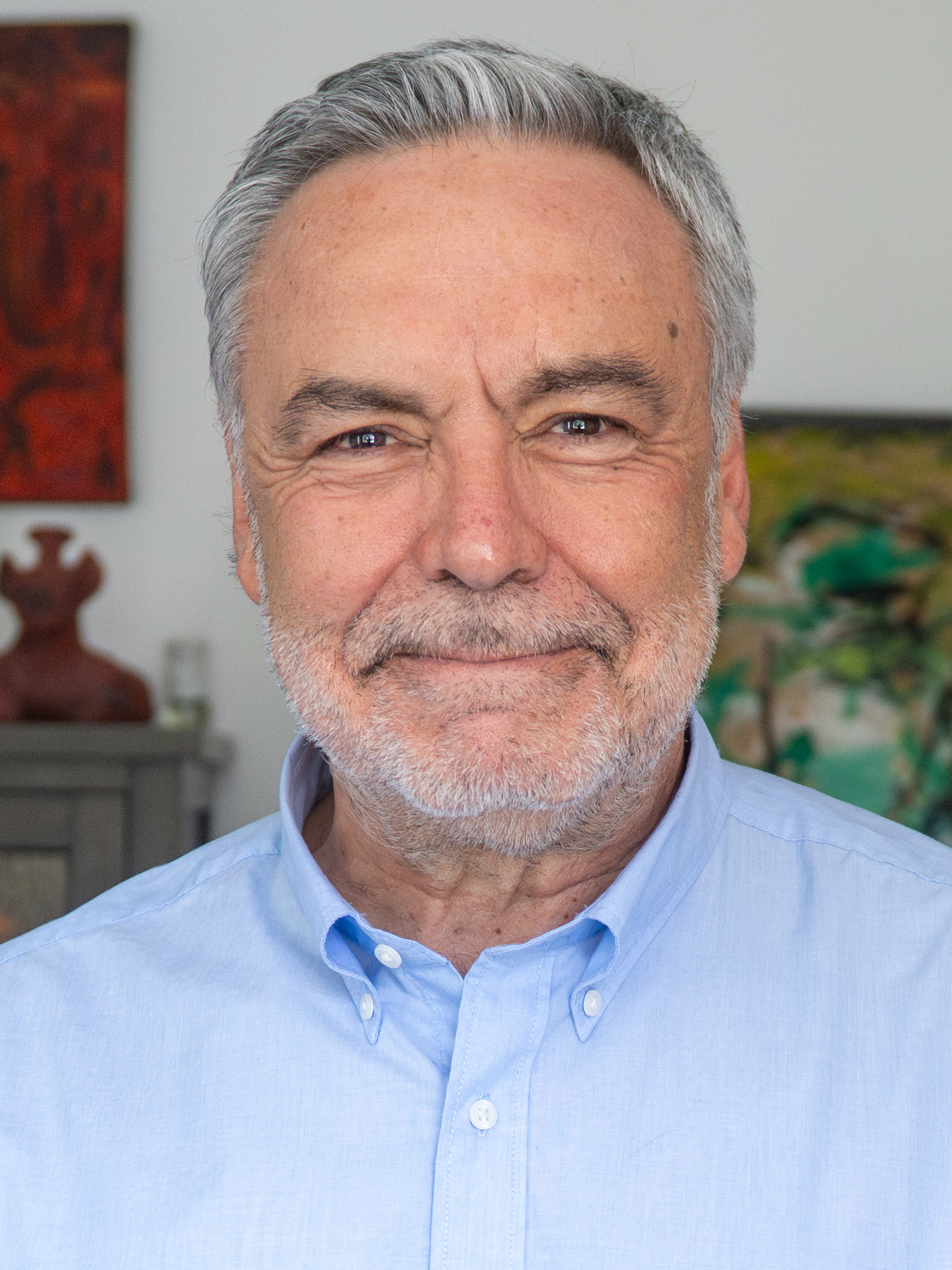
- Ramírez Cuéllar en 2025
- Born: 14 June 1959 (age 67); Río Grande, Zacatecas, Mexico
- Occupation: Politician
- Political party: MORENA

Alfonso Ramírez Cuéllar (born 14 June 1959) is a Mexican politician affiliated with the National Regeneration Movement (Morena).

Ramírez Cuéllar has served as a federal deputy on three occasions:

- 1997–2000 (57th Congress): plurinominal deputy for the second electoral region, covering his home state of Zacatecas, for the Party of the Democratic Revolution (PRD).
- 2003–2006 (59th Congress): representing Mexico City's eleventh district for the PRD.
- 2018–2020 (64th Congress): representing Mexico City's fourteenth district for Morena.

Between January and November, he served as interim general secretary of the National Regeneration Movement between the terms in office of Yeidckol Polevnsky and Mario Delgado Carrillo.
