= Marcelo Torres Cofiño =

Mexican politician and lawyer

President of the National Action Party
- In office 25 August 2018 – 14 October 2018
- Preceded by: Damián Zepeda Vidales
- Succeeded by: Marko Antonio Cortés Mendoza
- In office 17 February 2018 – 18 February 2018
- Preceded by: Damián Zepeda Vidales
- Succeeded by: Damián Zepeda Vidales

Personal details
- Born: 8 July 1966 (age 59); Torreón, Coahuila, Mexico
- Political party: PAN
- Occupation: Politician

Marcelo de Jesús Torres Cofiño (born 8 July 1966) is a Mexican politician and lawyer affiliated with the National Action Party (PAN).

In the 2012 general election he was elected to the Chamber of Deputies for the 62nd session of Congress, representing Coahuila's sixth district.

From August to October 2018, he was the national president of the PAN. Between 2018 and 2020, he sat as a member of the Congress of Coahuila.

He returned to the Congress of the Union for its 66th session in the 2024 general election as a plurinominal deputy.
