= Rubén Mendoza Ayala =

Mexican politician

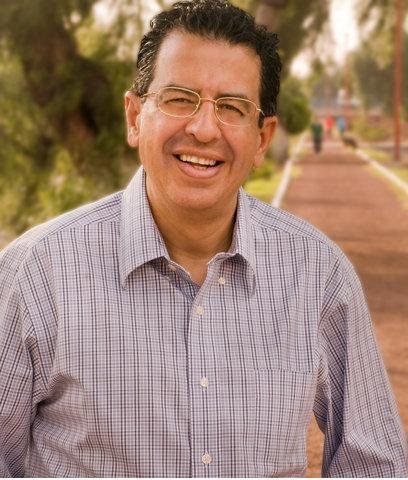
- Born: 2 February 1961; Tlalnepantla de Baz, State of Mexico, Mexico
- Died: 16 April 2016 (aged 55); Playa del Carmen, Quintana Roo, Mexico
- Education: National Autonomous University of Mexico
- Occupation: Politician
- Political party: PRI (1985–1996); PAN (1996–2009); PRD (2012–2016)

Rubén Mendoza Ayala (2 February 1961 – 16 April 2016) was a Mexican politician. At different times, he was affiliated to the Institutional Revolutionary Party (PRI), the National Action Party (PAN) and the Party of the Democratic Revolution (PRD).

In the 1997 mid-terms he was elected to the Chamber of Deputies to represent the State of Mexico's 15th district for the PAN during the 57th Congress.

He was municipal president of Tlalnepantla de Baz from 2000 to 2003.

In the 2003 mid-terms he was elected to the Chamber of Deputies to represent the State of Mexico's 16th district for the PAN during the 59th Congress.

In the 2005 state election he unsuccessfully ran against Enrique Peña Nieto for the governorship of the state. In 2009 he was expelled from the National Action Party due to his irregular financial management of the party's accounts.

In 2012 he joined the Party of the Democratic Revolution, where he ran again for the governorship.

Mendoza Ayala died in Playa del Carmen, Quintana Roo, on 16 April 2016.
