= 2005 State of Mexico election =

← 1999	3 July 2005	2011 →
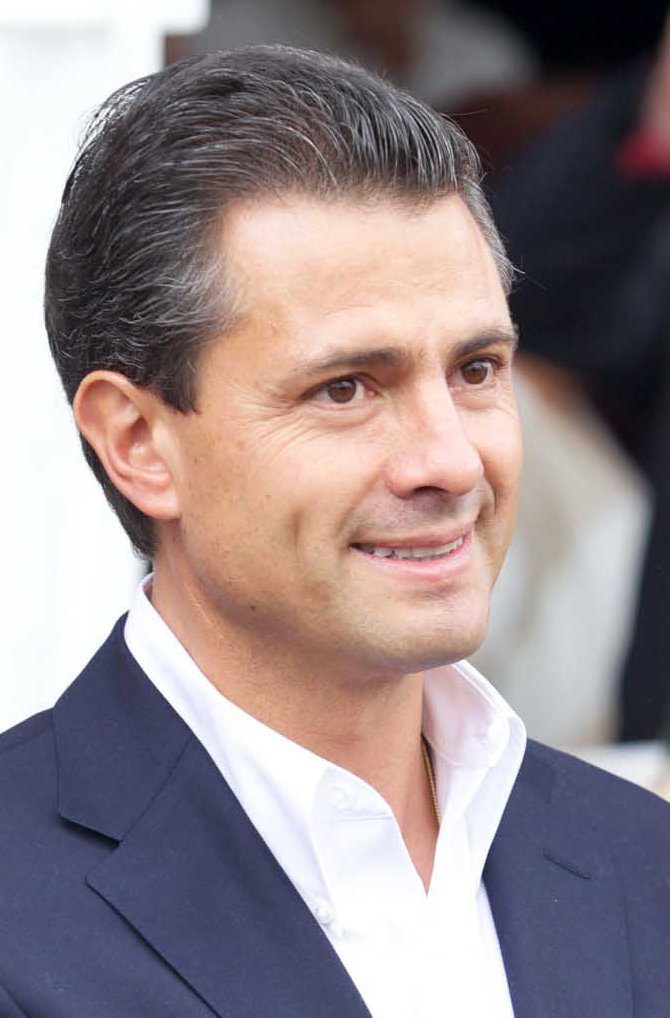

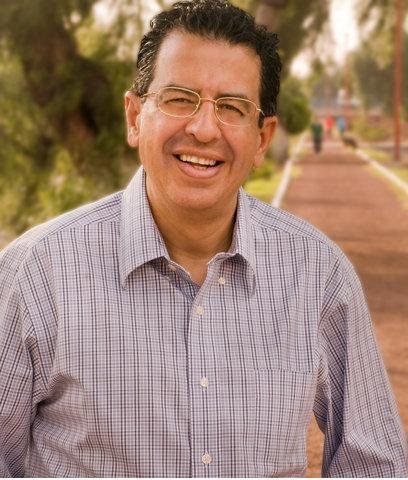

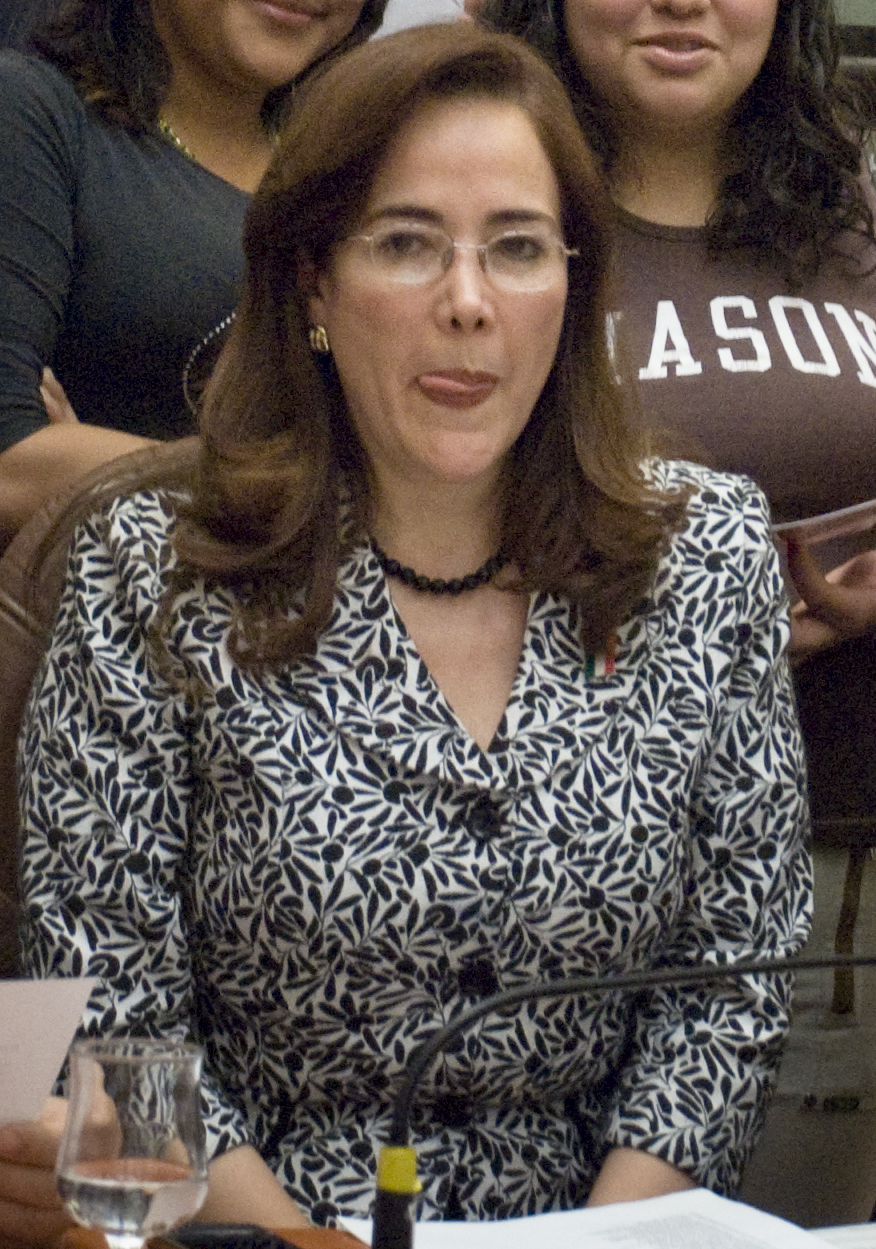
Candidate	Enrique Peña Nieto	Rubén Mendoza Ayala	Yeidckol Polevnsky Gurwitz
Party	PRI	PAN	PRD
Alliance	Alliance for Mexico
Popular vote	1,639,233	856,591	835,182
Percentage	47.45	24.79	24.17
Governor before election
Arturo Montiel Rojas
PRI
Elected Governor
Enrique Peña Nieto
PRI

A gubernatorial election was held in the State of México on Sunday, 3 July 2005. Voters in Mexico's most populous state went to the polls to elect a governor to replace former incumbent Arturo Montiel Rojas of the Institutional Revolutionary Party (PRI).

The favorite candidate was PAN's Rubén Mendoza. It was thought the first runner-up would be PRD Yeidckol Polevnsky Gurwitz (born as Citlali Ibáñez Camacho) and last place by PRI's Enrique Peña. However, Rubén Mendoza made several mistakes in his campaign, appearing apparently drunk at events, boasting he led a group of supporters to steal campaign gifts from Peña's team and gave them with his own signature (he was taped while doing this). The PRD would have benefited from this, but Polevnksy had no political experience and support from Andrés Manuel López Obrador wasn't enough, specially after her true identity was discovered. So PRI's Peña rose to the first place, the PRD had a distant and low second place and PAN's Rubén Mendoza disappeared from public view.

Turnout was an unusually low 48%.

Mendoza's campaign slogan was a variation of "Soy feo pero sé gobernar" (I'm ugly but I know how to govern).

== Results ==
With 93.38% of the votes it was clear that the PRI had managed to keep hold of the state.

Candidate	Party/Alliance	Votes	%
Enrique Peña Nieto	Institutional Revolutionary Party & Green Ecological Party of Mexico	1,639,233	47.45
Rubén Mendoza Ayala	National Action Party & Convergencia	856,591	24.79
Yeidckol Polevnsky Gurwitz	Party of the Democratic Revolution & Labour Party	835,182	24.17
Total		3,331,006	100%

== See also ==
- List of Mexican state governors
