= Todos por México =

Everyone for Mexico Todos por México
- Party presidents: Enrique Ochoa Reza; Carlos Alberto Puente Salas; Luis Castro Obregón
- Presidential candidate: José Antonio Meade
- Founded: 15 December 2017
- Dissolved: 28 August 2018
- Ideology: Liberalism; Constitutionalism; Green conservatism
- Political position: Centre to centre-right

Everyone for Mexico (Spanish: Todos por México), was a political coalition encompassing the Institutional Revolutionary Party (PRI), New Alliance (PANAL), and the Ecologist Green Party of Mexico (PVEM) to compete in the 2018 Mexican general election led by the presumptive nominee José Antonio Meade Kuribreña. The campaign was previously known as Meade Ciudadano por México (Citizen Meade for Mexico) until INE deemed unconstitutional the usage of the name of a political candidate within the name of a coalition, stating that allowing it would make Meade receive extra benefit from every piece of propaganda of the coalition.

Following the election, the New Alliance Party was dissolved because of failure to reach the 3% electoral threshold. On 28 August 2018, the Ecologist Green Party of Mexico announced it was leaving Everyone for Mexico, thus ending the coalition.

== Presidential elections ==
Election year	Candidate	Votes	%	Outcome	Notes
2018	José Antonio Meade	9,289,853	16.41	✗ Lost	

== Congressional elections ==
=== Chamber of Deputies ===
Election year	Constituency		PR		# of seats	Position	Presidency	Note
Election year	votes	%	votes	%	# of seats	Position	Presidency	Note
2018	13,349,430	23.85	13,397,304	23.80	63 / 500	Opposition	Andrés Manuel López Obrador	Tallies added from INE District Count.

=== Senate ===
Election year	Constituency		PR		# of seats	Position	Presidency	Note
Election year	votes	%	votes	%	# of seats	Position	Presidency	Note
2018	12,793,371	22.76	12,848,848	22.67	21 / 128	Opposition	Andrés Manuel López Obrador	Tallies added from INE District Count.

== See also ==
- Juntos Haremos Historia (MORENA, PT, and PES) coalition
- Por México al Frente (PAN, PRD, and MC) coalition
- List of political parties in Mexico
- 2018 Mexican general election
