= Juntos Haremos Historia =

2018 Mexican general electoral coalition

Together We Will Make History Juntos Haremos Historia
- Party presidents: Yeidckol Polenvsky; Alberto Anaya
- Presidential candidate: Andrés Manuel López Obrador
- Founded: 15 December 2017
- Dissolved: 23 December 2020
- Succeeded by: Juntos Hacemos Historia
- Ideology: Socialism of the 21st century; Left-wing nationalism; Cardenism; Reformism; Faction: Social conservatism
- Political position: Left-wing

Website
- lopezobrador.org.mx/temas/juntos-haremos-historia/

Juntos Haremos Historia (transl. Together We Will Make History) was a Mexican political coalition encompassing the National Regeneration Movement (MORENA), Labor Party (PT), and Social Encounter Party (PES), the latter of which was consequently absorbed into the National Regeneration Movement, to compete in the 2018 general election.

The coalition was disbanded in 2020 and succeeded by the Juntos Hacemos Historia coalition, including the Ecologist Green Party of Mexico.

== History ==
Juntos Haremos Historia was registered with the National Electoral Institute on 15 December 2017, to compete in the general election. The parties will field joint candidates for the presidency, 292 of 300 district seats in the Chamber of Deputies, and all 64 candidacies to the Senate of the Republic. The coalition is structured such that MORENA holds a 50 percent vote and the other two parties 25 percent. A similar distribution is followed for the allocation of candidacies, including at the state level.

On 18 February 2018, at its national convention, MORENA unanimously selected López Obrador as its presidential candidate; the Labor Party and Social Encounter Party followed over the next two days.

However, on 3 September, due to the fact that the Social Encounter Party failed to attract three percent of the vote in the elections for president, federal deputies, and senators, which under Mexican law prompts the loss of its federal registry and the appointment of a liquidator by the INE to dispose of the national party's assets, the PES and the New Alliance Party, both lost their registry after the 2018 elections, and after they challenged the results, to no avail, the party was dissolved. In early-2019, nine deputies from the PRD left the party and joined the MORENA-led government coalition of López Obrador and it resulted to the government gaining a two-thirds majority, allowing for the passage of constitutional reform.

== State coalitions ==
At the state level, Juntos Haremos Historia will compete as a similarly configured coalition in 27 of the 30 states holding simultaneous local elections in 2018. Among the states where the three parties did not enter into coalition was Hidalgo, where the state PES party is linked to former PRI Secretary of the Interior Miguel Ángel Osorio Chong. In the State of Mexico, a coalition agreement was signed but has caused dissent among PT party members for relegating the party in key municipalities.

== Election results ==
=== Presidential elections ===
| Election year | Candidate | Votes | % | Outcome | Notes |
|---|---|---|---|---|---|
| 2018 | Andrés Manuel López Obrador | 30,113,483 | 53.19% | ✓ Elected | |

=== Congressional elections ===
==== Chamber of Deputies ====
| Election year | Constituency | | PR | | # of seats | Position | Presidency | Note |
| Election year | votes | % | votes | % | # of seats | Position | Presidency | Note |
|---|---|---|---|---|---|---|---|---|
| 2018 | 24,345,307 | 43.49% | 24,536,267 | 43.58% | 306 / 500 | Majority Government | Andrés Manuel López Obrador | Tallies added from INE District Count. |

==== Senate ====
| Election year | Constituency | | PR | | # of seats | Position | Presidency | Note |
| Election year | votes | % | votes | % | # of seats | Position | Presidency | Note |
|---|---|---|---|---|---|---|---|---|
| 2018 | 24,495,628 | 43.56% | 24,746,578 | 43.65% | 69 / 128 | Majority Government | Andrés Manuel López Obrador | Tallies added from INE District Count. |

== See also ==
- 2018 Mexican general election
- Todos por México
- Por México al Frente
- List of political parties in Mexico
