= Yeidckol Polevnsky =

Mexican politician

Yeidckol Polevnsky Gurwitz
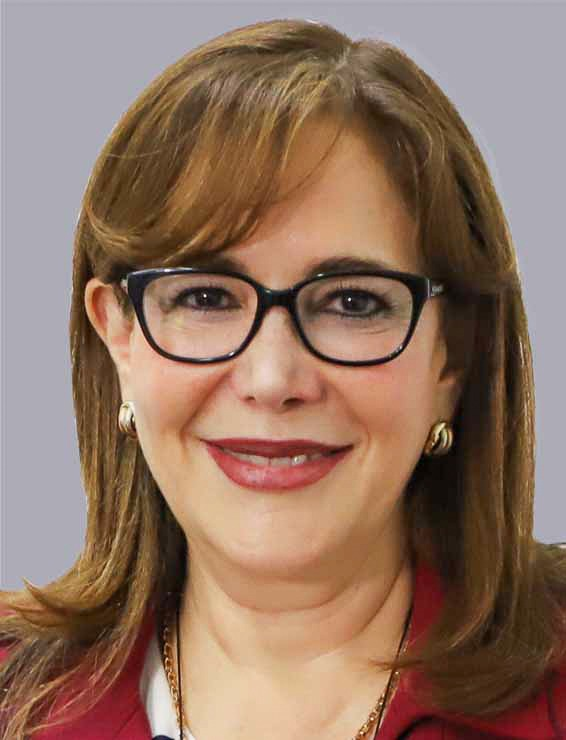
- Polevnsky Gurwitz in 2021

President of the National Regeneration Movement
- In office 12 December 2017 – 26 January 2020
- Preceded by: Andrés Manuel López Obrador
- Succeeded by: Alfonso Ramírez Cuéllar

Secretary General of the National Regeneration Movement
- In office 20 November 2015 – 28 October 2020
- Preceded by: Bertha Luján Uranga
- Succeeded by: Citlalli Hernández

Senator of the Congress of the Union for the State of Mexico
- In office 1 September 2006 – 31 August 2012
- Preceded by: Carlos Madrazo Limón
- Succeeded by: Ana Lilia Herrera Anzaldo

Personal details
- Born: Citlali Ibáñez Camacho; 25 January 1958 (age 68) Mexico City, Mexico
- Party: National Regeneration Movement (2014–present)
- Other political affiliations: Democratic Revolution (2005–14)
- Spouse: Arnold Rodríguez (m. 1970; div. 1995)
- Children: 2
- Website: Facebook; Twitter

Yeidckol Polevnsky Gurwitz (born 25 January 1958 in Mexico City as Citlali Ibáñez Camacho) is a Mexican politician. She was the General Secretary of the National Regeneration Movement (MORENA) between 2017 and 2020.

She was the Party of the Democratic Revolution's nominee for Governor of the State of Mexico in the 2005 election and served as a senator from the State of Mexico from 2006 to 2012.

== Early life and name change ==
The daughter of Guillermina Camacho Amezcua and Colonel Cuitláhuac Ibáñez Treviño, she had a difficult childhood. First, the unstable Ibáñez-Camacho marriage ended in divorce when Yeidckol (then called Citlali) was still a very little girl, at a time when Mexican society viewed women separated from their husbands as immoral. Seeking protection from her ex-husband, Mrs. Camacho pretended to be a relative of Mexican President Manuel Ávila Camacho, an assertion that would later cause great problems for the family.

In a press conference on 2 March 2005, Polevnsky explained that her original name is Citlali Ibáñez Camacho, but that due to family conflicts, her mother changed it despite having no attachments to any Polish backgrounds. Polevnsky stated in another interview that her surname is Polish.

== Professional career ==
She studied psychology at the Universidad Anáhuac in Mexico City. She has served various positions inside the Cámara Nacional de la Industria de la Transformación (CANACINTRA) (es), including a period in 2002 as first woman president.

== Political career ==
In 2005 she was nominated by the Party of the Democratic Revolution (PRD) as the candidate for governor for the 2005 State of Mexico election. She lost to PRI's Enrique Peña Nieto, who would later on become President of Mexico in 2012.

In the 2006 general election she supported the presidential campaign of Andrés Manuel López Obrador and was elected to the Senate, representing the State of Mexico.

In 2014, she resigned from the PRD and joined the National Regeneration Movement (MORENA) and ran as a mayoral candidate for Naucalpan, State of Mexico, for the 2015 elections.

Following the loss during the 2015 elections, on 20 November 2015, she was elected as General Secretary of MORENA. On 12 December 2017 she became President of MORENA once Andrés Manuel López Obrador left the post to become the party's candidate for the coalition "Juntos Haremos Historia." She formerly served in the Chamber of Deputies, resigning on 16 June 2023 in pursuit of the party's nomination in the 2024 presidential election.

== Controversy over conflict of interest ==
In November 2010, according to the Mexico City's El Universal newspaper, she was embroiled in a scandal after a controversial vote in the upper chamber which favored tobacco companies, since her daughter works for one of the largest. In the incident, Senator Polevnsky voted against the legislative reform to increase cigarette prices, and therefore in favor of tobacco companies. It was later revealed that her daughter—Shirley Camacho Almaguer—worked as manager of External Communications Mexico for British American Tobacco (BAT), a Mexican-British company responsible for the Mexican operations of the Kent, Camel, Dunhill Viceroy, Lucky Strike, Raleigh, Alas and Montana brands. She denied any wrongdoing, allegedly responding that her vote had nothing to do with her daughter's job. On the contrary, she said that having been leader of the Mexican National Chamber of Industry, she could understand the uncertainty experienced by industry. Polevnsky insisted on denying any conflict of interest. "Her work does not influence my work," referring to both her job and her daughter's.

== See also ==
- 2005 México state election
