= Damián Zepeda Vidales =

Mexican politician

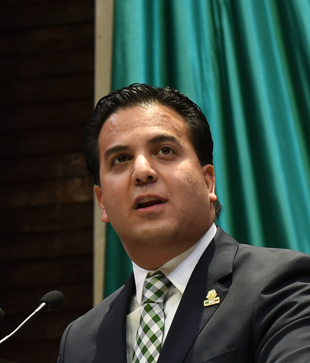
- Zepeda in 2014

President of the National Action Party
- In office 18 February 2018 – 25 August 2018
- Preceded by: Marcelo Torres Cofiño
- Succeeded by: Marcelo Torres Cofiño
- In office 9 December 2017 – 17 February 2018
- Preceded by: Ricardo Anaya
- Succeeded by: Marcelo Torres Cofiño

Personal details
- Born: 17 November 1978 (age 47) Hermosillo, Sonora, Mexico
- Party: PAN

Damián Zepeda Vidales (born 17 November 1978) is a Mexican politician affiliated with the National Action Party (PAN). In 2012–2015 he served as a federal deputy in the 62nd Congress, representing Sonora's fifth district. In December 2017, he was selected as the new president of the PAN after Ricardo Anaya Cortés resigned to run in the 2018 presidential election; he served as president of the PAN until August 2018.
