= Enrique Ochoa Reza =

Mexican politician, lawyer, and economist

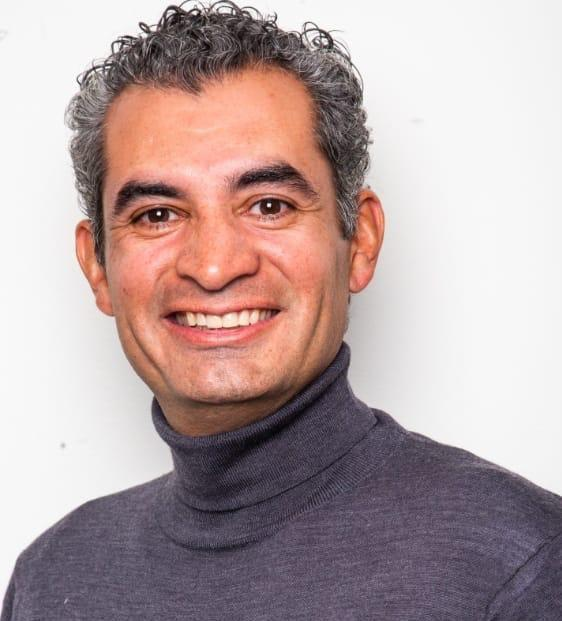

President of the Institutional Revolutionary Party
- In office July 12, 2016 – May 2, 2018
- Preceded by: Manlio Fabio Beltrones
- Succeeded by: René Juárez Cisneros

CEO of the Federal Electricity Commission
- In office February 2014 – July 2016
- Preceded by: Francisco Rojas Gutiérrez
- Succeeded by: Jaime Hernández Martínez

Personal details
- Born: September 1, 1972 (age 54) Morelia, Michoacán, Mexico
- Party: Institutional Revolutionary Party (PRI)
- Spouse: Greta Rojas Sánchez
- Children: 2
- Education: Instituto Tecnológico Autónomo de México (B.A. in Economics); National Autonomous University of Mexico (Law); Columbia University (M.A., Ph.D. in Political Science)
- Occupation: Politician, lawyer, economist, academic
- Profession: Lawyer, economist, political scientist
- Awards: The Quetzal Order (Guatemala, 2016); Order of Isabella the Catholic (Spain, 2015)

Enrique Ochoa Reza (Morelia, Michoacán; September 1, 1972) is an energy specialist, Ph.D. in Political Science and master's degrees from Columbia University, Lawyer from the UNAM and Economist from ITAM, professor and author. He is currently Global Industry Director: Energy, Utlities & Resources at IFS since July 2021; and Advisory Board Member at Corinex Communications since 2022.

He was a Federal Congressman in the LXIV Legislature of the Mexican Congress, where he served as Secretary of the Energy Commission and Secretary of the Justice Commission. From July 2016 to May 2018, he was the President of the National Executive Committee of PRI (Institutional Revolutionary Party). He served as CEO of the Federal Electricity Commission (CFE), Mexico's state-owned power and natural gas company, from February 2014 to July 2016, and before he served as Undersecretary of Hydrocarbons in the Ministry of Energy (SENER) from December 2012 to February 2014, where he promoted a constitutionally embedded energetic opening.

== Biography ==
He was born in Morelia, Michoacán on September 1, 1972. He is the son of Tomás Enrique Ochoa Moguel and Carmen Reza Chávez; he is married to Greta Rojas Sánchez with whom he has a daughter and a son. He is an economist who graduated from the Instituto Tecnológico Autónomo de México (ITAM) and a lawyer graduated from the Universidad Nacional Autónoma de México (UNAM). He has a master's degree in Political Philosophy, a master's degree in Political Science and a Ph.D. in Political Science from Columbia University, where one of his Professors was Joseph Stiglitz who is a recipient of the Nobel Prize in Economic Sciences.

== Professional Experience ==
He has worked in the economic and academic sectors. At present, he is a Federal Congressman and Secretary of the Energy Commission. Before this, he served as CEO of the Federal Electricity Commission (CFE) and he also served as Undersecretary of Hydrocarbons in the Ministry of Energy where he drove the energetic opening.

He has been part of different Energy Forums in México and abroad. He was a speaker in The Center on Global Energy Policy of Columbia, New York and in The Inter-American Dialogue, Washington D.C.

=== CEO of the Federal Electricity Commission (CFE) ===
In February 2014, he was appointed CEO of the Federal Electricity Commission to replace Francisco Rojas Gutiérrez. As CEO he drove the use of renewable energy sources and natural gas to generate electricity instead of using expensive fuels such as fuel oil and diesel which are contaminants. He also supported the Renewable Energy Auctions and the Clean Energy Certificates (CEL) to increase the generation of renewable energy. Three auctions which drove 74 projects in 15 different States took place. These auctions were internationally recognized due to their transparency and for achieving the lowest competitive prices registered in the world until then. The Clean Energy Certificates were used to reach the goal established in The General Law on Climate Change where 35% of the electricity generated in 2024 should come from clean sources. The Certificates were modified in 2019, compromising its efficiency. He launched 85 projects of infrastructure and gas pipelines through tenders supervised by Mexican Transparency. Those projects translated into investments of 26 thousand 230 million dollars to incentivize the electrical sector under the rules of the energetic opening.

==== Collective Bargaining CFE-SUTERM ====
During his administration, he renewed the Collective Labour Agreement with CFE-SUTERM which cut down the labour liabilities in 160 thousand million pesos. Once the negotiation concluded, CFE reported profits of 106 thousand 846 million pesos in its first semester of 2016, being this the first time since 2010 that the Company reported a positive financial result. Its operating profit was 142,438 million pesos larger (400%) than the loss of 35,592million pesos that the CFE registered in the same period of 2015. When the renewal of The Agreement ended, the Ministry of Finance and Public Credit contributed with 160 thousand million pesos which added up 320 thousand million less of the historical labour liabilities of 630 thousand million pesos.

The construction of new gas pipelines in México, due to long-term transportation contracts with CFE, allowed the Electricity Company to use more natural gas to generate power and replace fuel oil and diesel which are expensive and polluting. This resulted in an important reduction in costs. Additionally, the renegotiation of the Collective Labour Agreement in 2016, allowed to reduce the labour liabilities enhancing the finances in the short, medium and long term of CFE. Both policies were achieved during the Administration of Enrique Ochoa Reza, and gave leave to CFE to become a profitable company for the following 4 years, surpassing years of negative results. The net profits obtained by CFE in 2016 were of 76,300 million pesos; in 2017 were of 108, 200 million pesos; in 2018 were of 41, 900 million pesos and in 2019 were of 48,500 million pesos.

==== Leaving CFE ====
In September, 2016, after leaving CFE to become the President of the Institutional Revolutionary Party (PRI), he received 1 million 200 pesos (more or less 64 thousand American dollars in 2017) as settlement. After some questions arose, in December of that year Ochoa decided to donate the exact same amount to the Michou and Mau Foundation which treats burned children and to the UNAM Foundation.

== Federal Government ==
In the beginning of his professional career, what stands out is his experience as the advisor of the Secretary of Energy, Luis Téllez Kuenzler, from 1997 to 1999.

In December 2012, he was appointed Undersecretary of Hydrocarbons in the Ministry of Energy of the Government of the Republic, where he led the technical group that redacted and drove the energetic opening of 2013.

In that same year, he was designated as a member of the Board of Petróleos Mexicanos (PEMEX). He also designed the National Strategy for the Supply of Natural Gas.

== Judicial Power of the Federation ==
In the Electoral Tribunal of the Federal Judicial Branch (Tribunal Electoral del Poder Judicial de la Federación) he was the Director of the Center for Electoral Judicial Training, he was also the Private Secretary of the Chief Justice María del Carmen Alanís Figueroa. He also served as Technical Secretary of the Academic and Editorial Committee, and Technical Secretary of Training and Judicial Branch Career Committee.

== Legislative Branch ==
In the LXIV Legislature, he was a Federal Congressman and Secretary of the Energy Commission, Secretary of the Justice Commission and Secretary of the Permanent Commission, of the Mexican Congress, during the first recess of the second legislative year. He is also part of Social Security Commission. He was part of the Budget and Public Account Commission for the discussion of the Federal Budget for 2021.

According to the Information System on Parliamentary Interventions of the Mexican Congress, Enrique Ochoa Reza is the 5th Congressman, out of 500, with the highest number of participations during the LXIV Legislature (2018 to 2021). He is also a member of the PRI with the highest participations, in the Plenary and in the Commissions, according to data from the same parliamentary information system.

He has driven an intense agenda in favor of renewable energy resources, electric transportation and the installation of solar panels in the Federal Congress, for it to be the first self-sufficient legislative precinct in México, that could generate all the renewable electricity it consumes. He has introduced points of agreement and pronouncements to promote and to defend the right to produce and consume clean energy. He has also supported initiatives which promote circular economy and forbid the use of single use plastic. When it comes to Justice, he has stand out for proposing modifications to the Mexican National Domain Extinction Law because he considers it anti-constitutional. He contended and voted against the Constitutional Reform Act about Unofficial Remand Prison because he considers it violates the fundamental right of presumption of innocence.

Actively participated in the defense of a federalist and equitable Federal Budget for 2021, both in the commission and in the Plenary.

Asserted the need to label resources specifically for the purchase and application of COVID-19 vaccines, in order to guarantee their universal, free, timely and non-discriminatory access.

He spoke out against budget cuts to strategic sectors, states and autonomous organizations. He also pointed out that the Federal Electricity Commission is weakened by the 12% reduction in its budget in 2021.

He promoted the provision of greater resources to CFE, so that it could carry out the maintenance of generation plants and the existing electricity transmission network. Also, to invest in the development of clean energies and in the expansion of the transmission network; as well as in the modernization and expansion of hydroelectric power plants. He argued that, without sufficient economic resources, there is a risk of not having electricity to grow and there could even be blackouts in the future.

He voted against budget cuts for Michoacán and other states. He presented multiple proposals for readjustments and increased budgets for the states. He signed the so-called "Mother Reserve", through which a package of economic revitalization, regional development and metropolitan development was proposed.

To attend children with deafness, in the discussion of the 2021 Expenditure Budget, he requested the allocation of additional resources for the ISSSTE, the IMSS and the Health Sector.

He presented multiple technical arguments against the Preferential Initiative to reform the Electricity Industry Law since it would affect the generation of renewable energy. He pointed out that such reform breaks the principle by which modern electric systems work: the most economical electric energy is used first. The new law establishes that energy generated with fuel oil and diesel will be dispatched from CFE plants before solar, wind or natural gas plants in the private sector, which are low cost and friendly to the environment.

He affirmed that this amendment to the Electricity Industry Law will make the National Electrical System more expensive by 135 billion pesos. This amount was estimated by the Budget and Public Account Commission of the Chamber of Deputies. Consequently, there will be an increase in electricity bills or taxes will have to be increased to pay for more subsidies.

He emphasized that, with this reform, Mexico will not reach the environmental goal of the Paris Agreement or the Energy Transition Law. The goal establishes that 35% of electricity generation must be from clean sources by 2024. Likewise, the reform will affect public health due to the high emission of pollutants associated with the generation of electricity with fuel oil and diesel. In addition, this rule change affects the Investment Chapter of the trade agreements to which Mexico is a party.

He also presented, on behalf of the Congresswomen and Congressman of the Institutional Revolutionary Party, a dissenting vote against the Opinion of the Preferential Initiative. This was because it considered that Articles 25, 27 and 28 of the Constitution were violated according to the criteria expressed by the Second Chamber of the Supreme Court of Justice of the Nation when resolving Administrative Agreements on the central matter of the electric counter-reform.

The dissenting vote also states that the opinion did not consider the technical opinions expressed by specialists during the "Open Parliament". The opinion left out the negative opinion of the Federal Economic Competition Commission (COFECE) sent to the Chamber of Deputies, in which it recommended not to approve the Initiative since it affects competition and free economic concurrence.

Finally, he requested the inclusion in the Debate Diary of the session of February 23, 2020, in which the Preferred Initiative was discussed, of the Financial Report for the fourth quarter of 2020 presented by CFE to the Mexican Stock Exchange. The foregoing, in order to state for the record that the economic losses of CFE, its level of debt and onerous labor conditions disprove the statements made by Morena's Deputies during the discussion before the Plenary, regarding CFE's debt and payments to suppliers.

In April 2021, Enrique Ochoa Reza presented arguments in the Federal Congress against unconstitutional reforms to the Hydrocarbons Act. These reforms limit free competition by affecting consumers and rescinding permits for the transport, storage and sale of hydrocarbons without due process of law.

In the Energy Commission he presented a particular vote against reforms to the Hydrocarbons Act. This Particular Vote was published in the parliamentary gazette and includes the opinion of technical, legal and economic specialists; as well as the opinion of the Federal Economic Competition Commission (COFECE), in which it notes that the reform is contrary to free competition and free economic concurrence protected by the Constitution.

Likewise, Ochoa Reza spoke out and voted against eliminating asymmetric regulation of the hydrocarbons sector and removing that power from the Energy Regulatory Commission (CRE). By removing this regulation, Pemex will once again be a monopoly affecting the consumer.

Finally, on April 22 and 23, 2021, he objected against Transitory Article 13 of the Organic Law of the Federal Judicial Power. In this Transitory, the term is extended, violating the Constitution, the period of the members and the President of the Federal Judicial Council.

In his speech in the Plenary of the Chamber of Deputies, Ochoa Reza expressed that a fundamental principle of a modern democracy is the constitutional supremacy, where no reform of the law can go against of what the Constitution indicates.

== Civil Societies ==
From 2005 to 2012 he was part of the National Network in favour of Oral Trials and Due Legal Process; he was also a member of the Initiative for Policy Dialogue based at Columbia University. Since 2005 he has been a member of the Mexican Council of International Affairs (COMEXI). In 2015 he was appointed vice-president of the Latin American Business Council of The World Economic Forum held in Davos, Switzerland.

== PRI ==
He has been an active member of the Institutional Revolutionary Party (PRI) since 1991, and was its president from July 12, 2016, to May 2, 2018.

While he was the President of the Party in 2017, Alfredo del Mazo Maza won the election to become the Governor of the State of Mexico and Miguel Riquelme won the election to become the Governor of the State of Coahuila in the 2017 elections.

On August 12, 2017, the Ordinary National Assembly of the Party took place and one of the main agreements reached was to open the doors to civil society, members and followers of the Party, so they could be candidates in the 2018 elections. In this way, it was approved that half of the candidatures were for women and that one in three positions were for young people.

He has held different positions in the Party: He has been a member of the Energy Committee of the National Political Council in 2004 and from 2014 to 2015; Delegate of the XIX National Assembly in 2005, of the XX in 2008, of the XXI in 2013, and of the XXII in 2017. He has also been a National Political Councilor in two different occasions, from 2005 to 2006 and from 2013 up to now; Advisor Technical Secretary of Victor's Manuel Tinoco Rubí campaign to become the Governor of Michoacán in 1995. After Manlio Fabio Beltrones left the Presidency of the National Executive Committee of The Party, he was mentioned as one of the possible successors, this rumour was confirmed when he announced his registry before the National Commission of Internal Processes of The Party.

As he was the only one to register, he accepted the position as President of the CEN of PRI on July 12, 2016. In early October of the same year, he introduced an equal gender integration of his National Executive Committee.

=== National President of the CEN of PRI ===
In his first 100 days as President of PRI, he visited the 32 States to talk to members and followers of PRI in order to drive the creation of the Anti-corruption Commission which was approved in October 2016; this commission is in charge of reviewing the profiles of those who want to be candidates of The Party; and to follow up the resolutions of different Mexican Institutions in charge of Public Accountability or Acts of Corruption.

He informed that Javier Duarte de Ochoa, former Governor of Veracruz, was expelled from The Party, as well as some of his collaborators. He also announced that the Party Rights of Roberto Borge Angulo, former Governor of Quintana Roo, were suspended; and that Tomás Yarrington Ruvalcaba, former Governor of Tamaulipas, was also expelled from the Party.

== Academic life ==
From 2005 to 2015 he taught Constitutional Law and Constitutional Theory at the Universidad Nacional Autónoma de México (UNAM). Since 2013, he holds the position of Supernumerary Academic in the Mexican Academy of Jurisprudence and Legislation.

== Published books ==
He has written articles for the magazines Este País, Nexos, Letras Libres and El Mundo del Abogado; he is also the author and co-author of books and chapters published in México and the United States, including:

- The PRI and its Political Identity. Revolution Today. 2017, México: Panorama Editorial.
- The Reform of the Mexican Electricity Sector. To Understand Collection. 2015, México: Nostra Ediciones.
- New Perspectives on International Migration and Development. Co-editor with Jerónimo Cortina, Introduction is written with Joseph E. Stiglitz. 2013, New York: Columbia University Press.
- What are Oral Trials and what are they for? Co-author with Miguel Carbonell. 2008, México: UNAM-Renace-Porrua, 11 editions.
- “Multiple Arenas of Struggle: Federalism and Mexico's Transition to Democracy” in Federalism and Democracy in Latin America, Johns Hopkins University Press, Baltimore, London, 2004
- Ansolabehere Sesti, Karina, Daniela Cerva Cerna and Enrique Ochoa Reza (Coordinator). (2009). "Gender Equality and Electoral Law in México". 2009, México: Electoral Court of the Federal Judicial Power.
- Ochoa Reza, Enrique. (2008). "Federalism, Democracy and Inequality: Mexico in Comparative Perspective." Thesis (Ph.D.) Columbia University.
- Carbonell Sánchez, Miguel, and Ochoa Reza Enrique. 2009. "Comparative Law against Legislative Reforms: The Case of Chile". Rev. Law [online]. 2009, n.32, pp. 271–305.

He has also published OpEd's about natural gas and renewable energy in Reforma, El Norte and Mural newspapers.

== Awards ==
In 2015 he was awarded Person of the Year by The Oil & Gas Magazine. In 2014 he received the LP Gas Industry Merit award. He has been presented with different distinctions such as:

The Highest National Distinction of Guatemala, The Quetzal Order in the degree of Grand Cross in 2016, and The Order of Isabel la Católica, granted by The Kingdom of Spain, in 2015.

On February 10, 2016, he received a mention from the Mayor of Passiac, New Jersey.
