= Ricardo Anaya =

Mexican politician

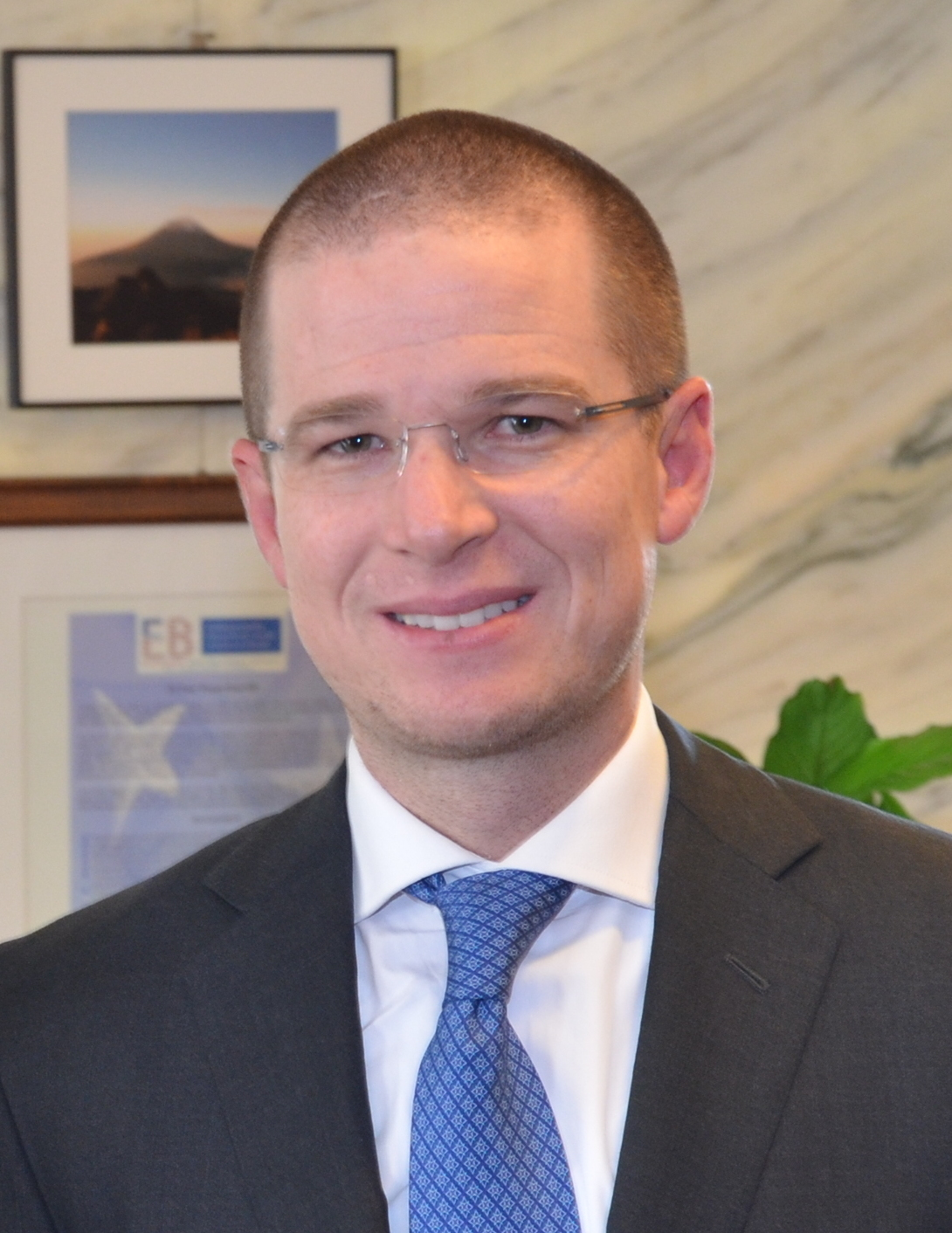
- Anaya in 2015

Senator of Congress of the Union
- Incumbent
- Assumed office 1 September 2024

President of the National Action Party
- In office 21 August 2015 – 9 December 2017
- Preceded by: Gustavo Madero Muñoz
- Succeeded by: Damián Zepeda Vidales
- In office 30 September 2014 – 20 January 2015
- Preceded by: Gustavo Madero Muñoz
- Succeeded by: Gustavo Madero Muñoz

Member of the Congress of the Union Plurinominal
- In office 20 January 2015 – 30 June 2015
- Preceded by: Ana Paola López Birlian
- Succeeded by: Ana Paola López Birlian

General Secretary of the National Action Party
- In office 1 September 2012 – 6 March 2014
- In office 19 May 2014 – 30 September 2014
- President: Gustavo Madero Muñoz
- Preceded by: Jorge Ocejo Moreno
- Succeeded by: Fernando Álvarez Monje

President of the Chamber of Deputies
- In office 1 September 2013 – 6 March 2014
- Preceded by: Francisco Arroyo Vieyra
- Succeeded by: José González Morfin

Undersecretary of Tourism Planning
- In office 1 April 2011 – 31 January 2012
- President: Felipe Calderón
- Preceded by: Jacqueline Arzoz Padrés
- Succeeded by: Jorge Mezher Rage

President of the National Action Party in Queretaro
- In office 27 February 2010 – 31 March 2011
- Preceded by: Jose Edmundo Guajardo Treviño
- Succeeded by: Guillermo Vega Guerrero

Local deputy of the Congress of the State of Queretaro Plurinominal
- In office 27 September 2009 – 31 March 2011
- Succeeded by: Adriana Cruz Dominguez

Personal details
- Born: Ricardo Anaya Cortés; 25 February 1979 (age 47) Naucalpan de Juárez, State of Mexico, Mexico
- Party: National Action Party
- Spouse: Carolina Martinez (m. 2005)
- Children: 3
- Education: Autonomous University of Queretaro (LLB); University of the Valley of Mexico (LLM); National Autonomous University of Mexico (PhD)

Ricardo Anaya Cortés (Spanish: [ɾiˈkaɾðo anˈaʝa koɾˈtes]; born 25 February 1979) is a Mexican lawyer and politician, serving as a senator since 2024. He is a member and former president of the centre-right National Action Party (PAN). He held the positions of Federal Deputy in the LXII Legislature of the Congress of the Union in Mexico, President of the Chamber of Deputies in Mexico and leader of the Parliamentary Group of the main opposing party in the Chamber of Deputies in Mexico. He held the position of National President of the National Action Party until 9 December 2017, when he resigned to run in the 2018 presidential election for the PAN party in political coalition with the centrist parties Party of the Democratic Revolution (PRD) and Citizens' Movement (MC).

Since January 2019 he has been a visiting professor of politics at the School of International and Public Affairs, Columbia University.

Emilio Lozoya Austin, former head of PEMEX, accused Anaya in July 2020 of receiving a MXN $6.8 million bribe to support energy reform in 2013–2014. Anaya denied the charge and insisted he had supported privatization of PEMEX out of conviction.

== Academic background ==
Ricardo Anaya Cortés holds a Bachelor of Law with honors from the Universidad Autónoma de Querétaro. He also has a master's degree in Tax Law from Universidad del Valle de México, from which he graduated with honors, and a Ph.D. in Political Science and Social Studies, again with honors, from Universidad Nacional Autónoma de México (UNAM). He has been a permanent lecturer in Constitutional Law and State Theory in the Law School of Universidad Autónoma de Querétaro.

== Labor and party trajectory ==
Ricardo Anaya is a member of the National Action Party. In 2000, when he was 21 years old, he was PAN's candidate for Local Deputy in the XIV District of Querétaro, which comprised Arroyo Seco and Pinal de Amoles municipalities, and he achieved an increase of more than 400% in votes for his party in relation with the previous election. He was Private Secretary for the Governor of the State of Querétaro from 2003 to 2009 and he held the position of Human Development Coordinator of the Government of the State of Querétaro from 2008 to 2009. He was a Local Deputy for the LVI Legislature of the State of Querétaro, where he held the position of Coordinator of the National Action Party's Parliamentary Group, which was the largest one.

He was President of the State Managing Committee of his party in the State of Querétaro from February 2010 to 31 March 2011, and on 1 April 2011 he was appointed Tourism Planning Undersecretary of the Ministry of Tourism of the Federal Government by the Mexican President, Felipe Calderón Hinojosa.

He was elected Federal Deputy under the proportional representation principle for the LXII Legislature, from 2012 to 2015, where he held the position of President of the Chamber of Deputies from 1 September 2013 to 5 March 2014.

On 30 September 2014, Gustavo Madero Muñoz took leave of absence from his position as PAN's president to lead the list of deputies under proportional representation of his party in the 2015 Election, and therefore, the Permanent Commission of the party appointed Ricardo Anaya Cortés who then held the position of General Secretary of the party, as National President and Fernando Álvarez Monje was appointed as the new General Secretary.

On 20 January 2015, when Madero Muñoz was plurinominal Federal Deputy candidate, he went back to leading the party and appointed Anaya Cortés as the new PAN's Parliamentary Group Coordinator in the Chamber of Deputies, while José Isabel Trejo Reyes who held the position of PAN Deputies' Coordinator, was elected as the new General Secretary of the party.

In 2015 he was a contender for the National President position in his party, and he won with more than 80% of votes against Javier Corral Jurado.

In 2017 Ricardo Anaya Cortés met the German Chancellor Angela Merkel to discuss the international situation after Donald Trump's election as President of the United States. Likewise, he gave a lecture at George Washington University on the relations between Mexico and the United States, where he rejected Trump's idea of building a wall on the border between both countries as "insulting and unacceptable".

Anaya was one of the candidates for President of Mexico in the general elections held in 2018. In polls, Anaya scored second behind Andrés Manuel López Obrador. On July 1, 2018, Anaya came in second, losing the election to López Obrador in a landslide. Anaya won the state of Guanajuato but lost every other state.

Party political offices
| Preceded by Josefina Vázquez Mota | National Action Party nominee for President of Mexico; 2018 | Succeeded by Undetermined |
| Preceded by Andrés Manuel López Obrador | Party of the Democratic Revolution nominee for President of Mexico; 2018 | Most recent |
