= Refugio Reyes Rivas =

Mexican architect (1862–1943)

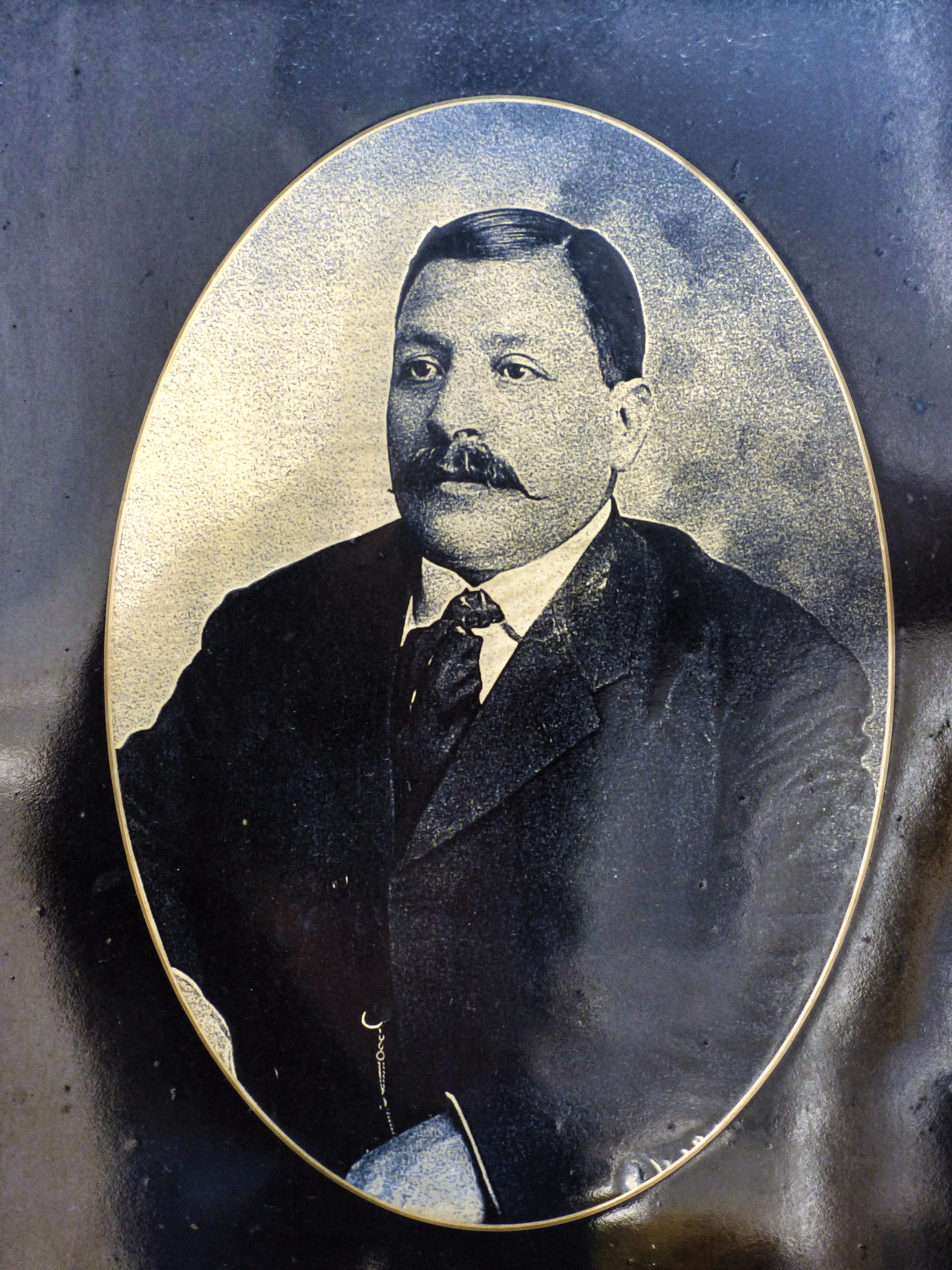
- Born: 2 September 1862; Vetagrande Municipality, Mexico
- Died: 3 February 1943 (aged 80); Aguascalientes, Mexico
- Occupation: Architect
- Notable work: Templo de San Antonio Museo de Aguascalientes Castillo Douglas Templo de la Purísima Concepción

Signature
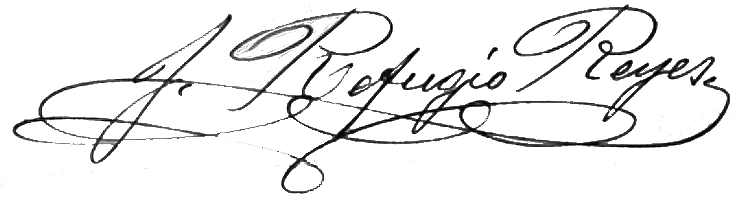

José Refugio Reyes Rivas (September 2, 1862 - February 3, 1943) was a Mexican architect, author of some of the most representative buildings of the city of Aguascalientes, where his work is considered part of the historical and architectural heritage. Reyes did not have professional architectural studies, so he is called "empirical architect". In 1985 he received the post mortem title of architect, granted by the Autonomous University of Aguascalientes. Reyes completed more than 200 buildings in the states of Zacatecas, Jalisco and Aguascalientes. He was characterized by his use of diverse decorative styles, from neoclassical to Art Nouveau, as well as construction innovations of the first half of the 20th century.

Among his most outstanding works are the Templo de San Antonio, the renovation of the Templo de Guadalupe, the Templo de la Purísima Concepción, the construction of several hotels, such as the París, Francia, Regis and Washington, and the current Museo de Aguascalientes. Several of these buildings are currently museums or are part of the governmental institutions of the state and the city of Aguascalientes.

== Biography ==
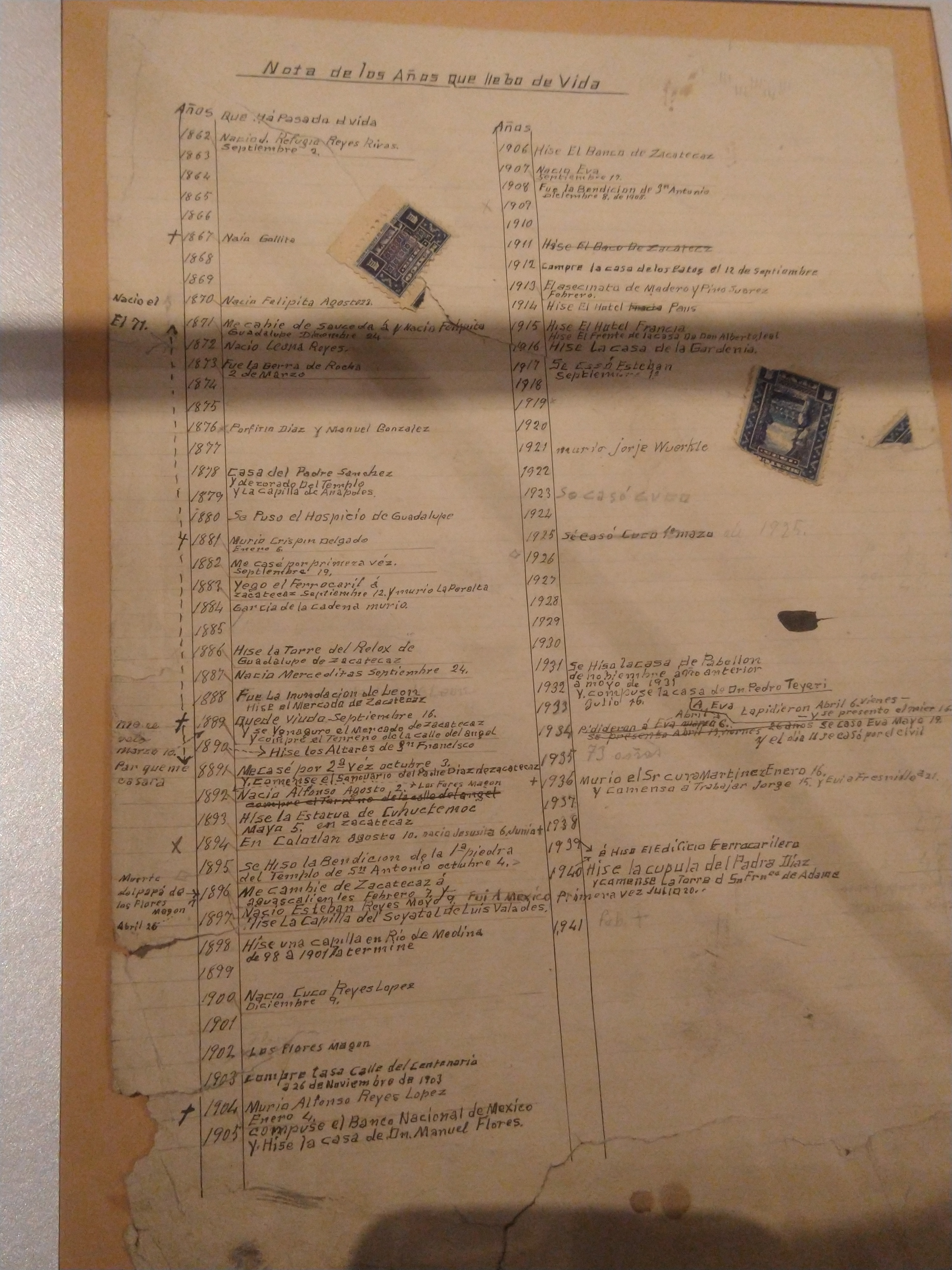
Chronological notes on the life of Refugio Reyes.

Refugio Reyes was born on September 2, 1862, as he himself tells in some autobiographical notes. However, in the registry books of Sauceda la Borda there is no indication of his name, but of Esteban, due to the fact that his parents, Juan Reyes and María Jesús Rivas, made the procedure before the civil registry with that name and later with the name Refugio in the parish registry. As was the custom of the time, the name recorded in the parish records was taken into account.

Víctor Manuel Villegas tried to reconstruct the architect's biography in his book Arquitectura de Refugio Reyes, in which he took up the notes of Refugio Reyes himself in the form of memoirs, under the nickname "Notas de los años que llevo de vida" or "Note de los años que hé pasado" (sic) ("Notes of the years I have been alive" or "Note of the years I have passed"). In these notes, all the years of the architect's life are gathered without interruption; however, since it is a very irregular log, there are some data that do not appear or are incomplete.

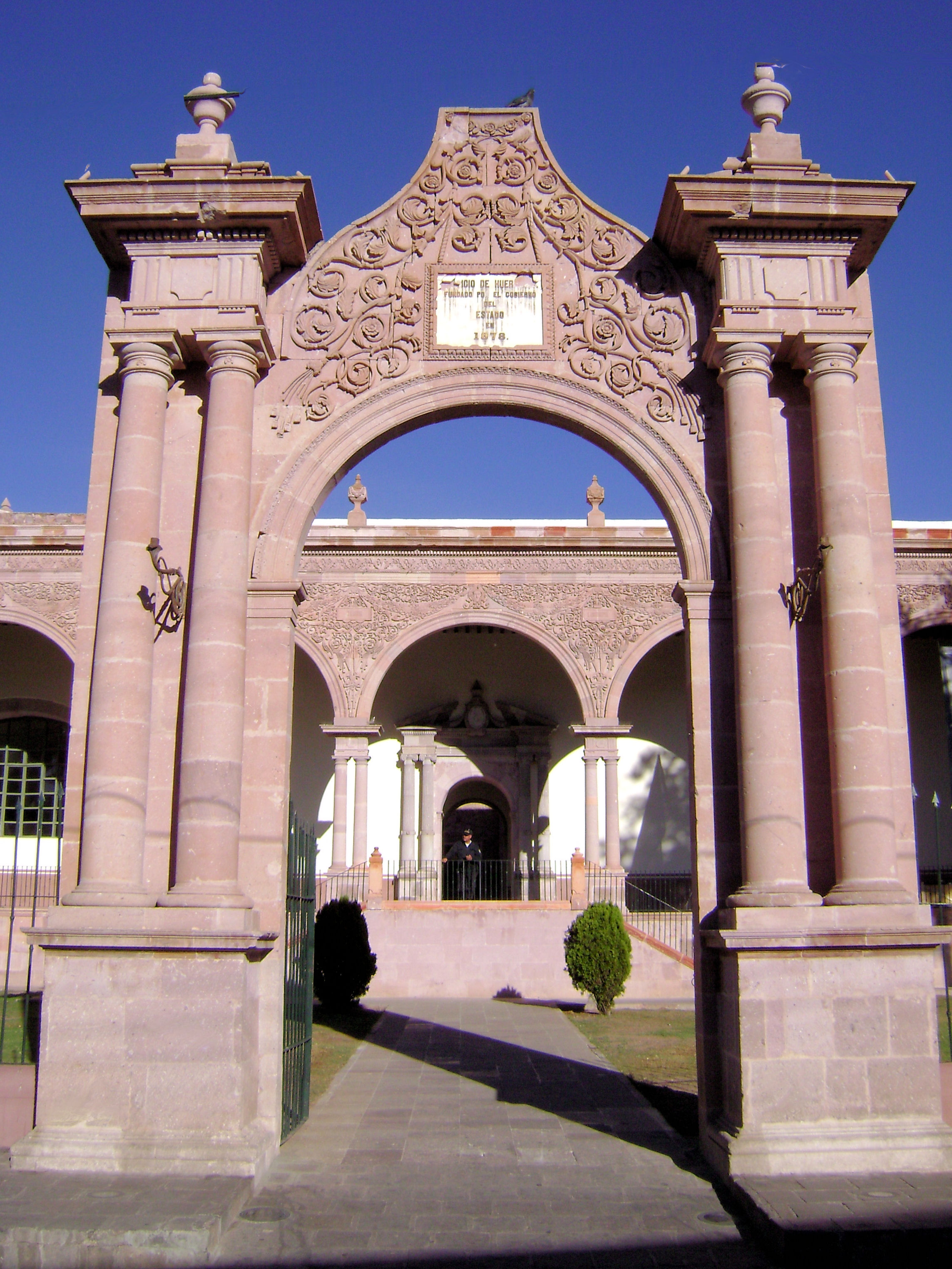
Franciscan Hospice where Refugio Reyes studied as a child. It is currently the Museo de Guadalupe, Zacatecas.

For Refugio Reyes the most important events of his childhood, considering that he was born in 1862, were the births of his sisters Goya in 1867, Felipa in 1871 (Note: Refugio Reyes refers to his younger sisters as Goyita and Felipita.) and Leona in 1872. Another of the events he notes in his chronology was his transfer to a hospice in Guadalupe, Zacatecas, in 1871. He also noted in his own words the Zacatecas War of March 2, 1873, which appears among his notes under the name "Guerra de Rocha" (Rocha's War). Between the ages of eleven and fourteen he made notes on political and military events related to the president of that time, Porfirio Díaz.

His childhood was precarious, dominated by uncertainty. His house had only one room. He had to travel on foot to the municipality of Guadalupe from Sauceda de la Borda, his hometown. Right there, in Guadalupe, there was a Franciscan convent where he began to study. His friends called him Cuco, and he seemed happy; however, his parents did not agree that he should continue studying and, for a time, he returned to Sauceda to support his family financially. Brother Alfonso from the convent insisted on the importance of Refugio continuing his studies, so he made a deal with his parents: they would get him a job with the promise that the salary would be given to them in full. The job they got him was as a mason's helper, and the Franciscans also sent beans and corn to his family.

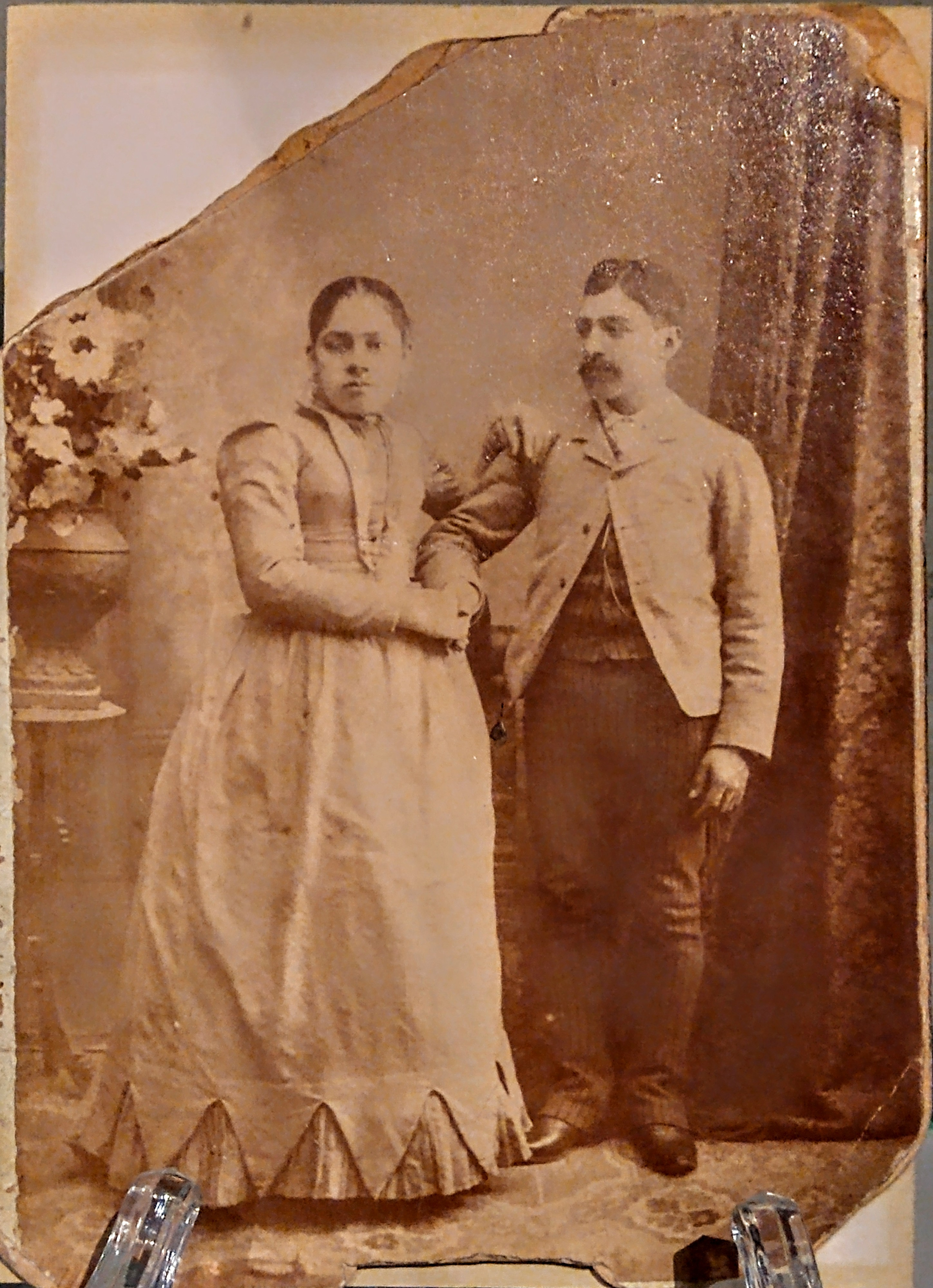
Photograph of Felipa López and Refugio Reyes, ca. late 19th and early 20th century.

In the Franciscan school Refugio felt as if he were with his family; there he learned to read, write and some Latin. Reyes would always return to the Guadalupe convent, even while living in Aguascalientes, whenever he could, because, in addition to the bond he had with the convent, he was in charge of the remodeling and construction of the church tower.

=== Family life ===
Refugio Reyes married twice. The first time on September 19, 1882, at the age of twenty, with Gregoria Palomino, widowed shortly after; with her he had his first daughter, Mercedes, in 1882. He remarried Felipa López in 1890. In his second marriage he had five children: Alfonso (August 2, 1892); Jesusa (June 6), who died the same day of her birth; Esteban (May 9, 1896); Refugio (December 9, 1900) and Eva (September 17, 1907). The name of his second to last son, Refugio, appears in the lists of his constructions and was the one who followed in his father's footsteps.

As Esther Romo Reyes, Refugio's granddaughter, points out, the family was characterized for having worked in the construction trade, since Juan Reyes, father of the architect emeritus, also worked as a stonemason, as well as Timoteo López, who was his father-in-law.

== Historical context ==
During the period in which Refugio Reyes was born, diverse social, cultural and political events took place in Mexico and the rest of the world. On the aesthetic level, the second half of the 19th century brought about various stylistic and artistic changes, as the neoclassical style declined and the neo-Gothic style emerged. There were also important political events, such as the second French intervention in Mexico. In the same year of Refugio Reyes' birth, the Battle of Puebla took place.

At the end of the 19th century, there was an important industrial development in Mexico due to the opening of the first railroad lines. In Aguascalientes, in 1895 La Gran Fundición Central Mexicana of Salomón Guggenheim influenced a notable growth of the metropolitan area. The positivist model of Porfirianism boomed in the central part of the country. All these political and economic events that affected Mexico in this period had a great impact on the career of Refugio Reyes and other builders of the time. The economic and industrial growth of the state and nearby regions at the end of the 19th century and the beginning of the 20th century boosted the architectural and urban development of the area. The construction of the Templo de San Antonio and other important works by Refugio Reyes coincided with the mining development of Asientos and Tepezalá, the main municipalities of Aguascalientes in terms of mining production.

The Mexican Revolution (1910-1920), an event that transformed the socio-political structure of the entire country, also has a preponderance, since the railroads of Aguascalientes were an obligatory passage for Villists, Carrancists and Huertists troops.

A revolutionary anecdote relates that in 1914, Alberto Fuentes Dávila and David G. Berlanga, tried to take the Templo de San Antonio to turn it into Legislative Palace, as retaliation to the support of the church to the troops of Victoriano Huerta; for this reason, a group of catholic women headed by Adela Douglas opposed and defended the doors of the temple with sticks and stones.

In 1925, after the Mexican Revolution, the Fundición Central Mexicana ceased to operate; this company was the main source of employment in Aguascalientes at that time, so it was also a hard blow for the streetcars, which had had a network that extended through four directions, leaving only the one that linked the main square with the railroad station.

== Professional life ==
=== Career in Zacatecas ===
In his notes, Refugio Reyes describes his participation as a laborer and assistant in the decoration of the "Templo y la Capilla de Anapoles" (sic) —Chapel of Naples—, when he was sixteen years old. Among his papers is the name of the notebook "Nuevo método para aprender a escribir con rapidez y elegancia" ("New method to learn to write quickly and elegantly"), with which he seems to have perfected his writing, since his formal education ended in the third year of primary school.

One of the first projects Refugio Reyes worked on was the construction of the Central Mexican Railroad in Zacatecas, where he learned some of the most modern techniques of the time, especially with respect to metal structures.

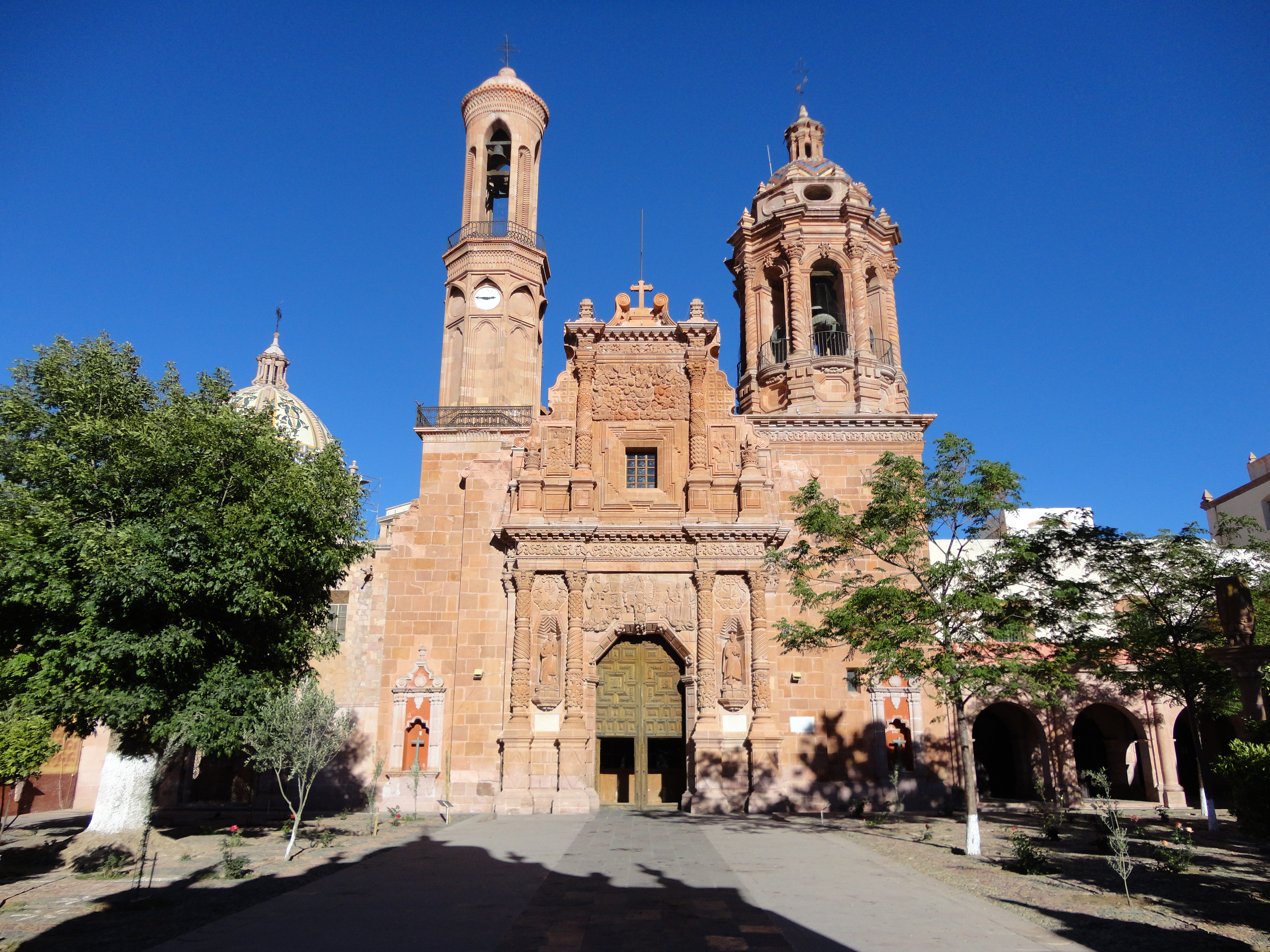
Franciscan temple in Guadalupe, Zacatecas, where Refugio Reyes designed the Clock Tower.

It is said that it was between the ages of fourteen and nineteen when he learned to write and read fluently, since he also learned about the calculation of the resistance of materials of the "works of art" on the Zacatecas Railroad. Refugio frequently asked technical questions to the engineers during this period, which favored his learning in areas that exceeded his activity in construction. The assimilation of this knowledge favored his use of iron as the main construction material, which is why it is present in each of his most important works. This determination to learn allowed him to gain the trust of one of the French contractors, who would be his liaison for the contracting in the construction of the Mercado de Zacatecas.

The first work he was commissioned to do was the "Clock Tower" of the Templo de Guadalupe, Zacatecas, in 1886, a work that stands out for its neo-baroque style and its independent character with respect to the front of the church. Reyes himself points out that the work, being a commission, was not entirely his own design. The work was finished in five months, and is considered as a rehearsal for other later works, and one that gave him a step in his career, giving way directly to the construction of the Santuario de Guadalupe, or Guadalupito, in the city of Zacatecas. In 1888, at the age of twenty-six, he built the Mercado de Zacatecas. In his memoirs, he notes that he married for the first time at the age of twenty (September 19, 1882) and was widowed on September 16, 1889, the year of the inauguration of the Market.

In the 1890s he continued his work in Zacatecas for the Franciscans, where he made the altars in the Templo de San Francisco. On October 2, 1891 he married for the second time, the same year he began the construction of the sanctuary of Father Diaz, where panels with abstract representations —reproduced in the sanctuary of the Templo de Guadalupe, Zacatecas— appear. The first statue Reyes made was a Cuauhtémoc, in 1892, inspired by the statue of Paseo de la Reforma in Mexico City. This statue is located in a building adjacent to the old Templo de la Compañía de Jesús, now the Templo y Exconvento de Santo Domingo, where the Museo Pedro Coronel is located.

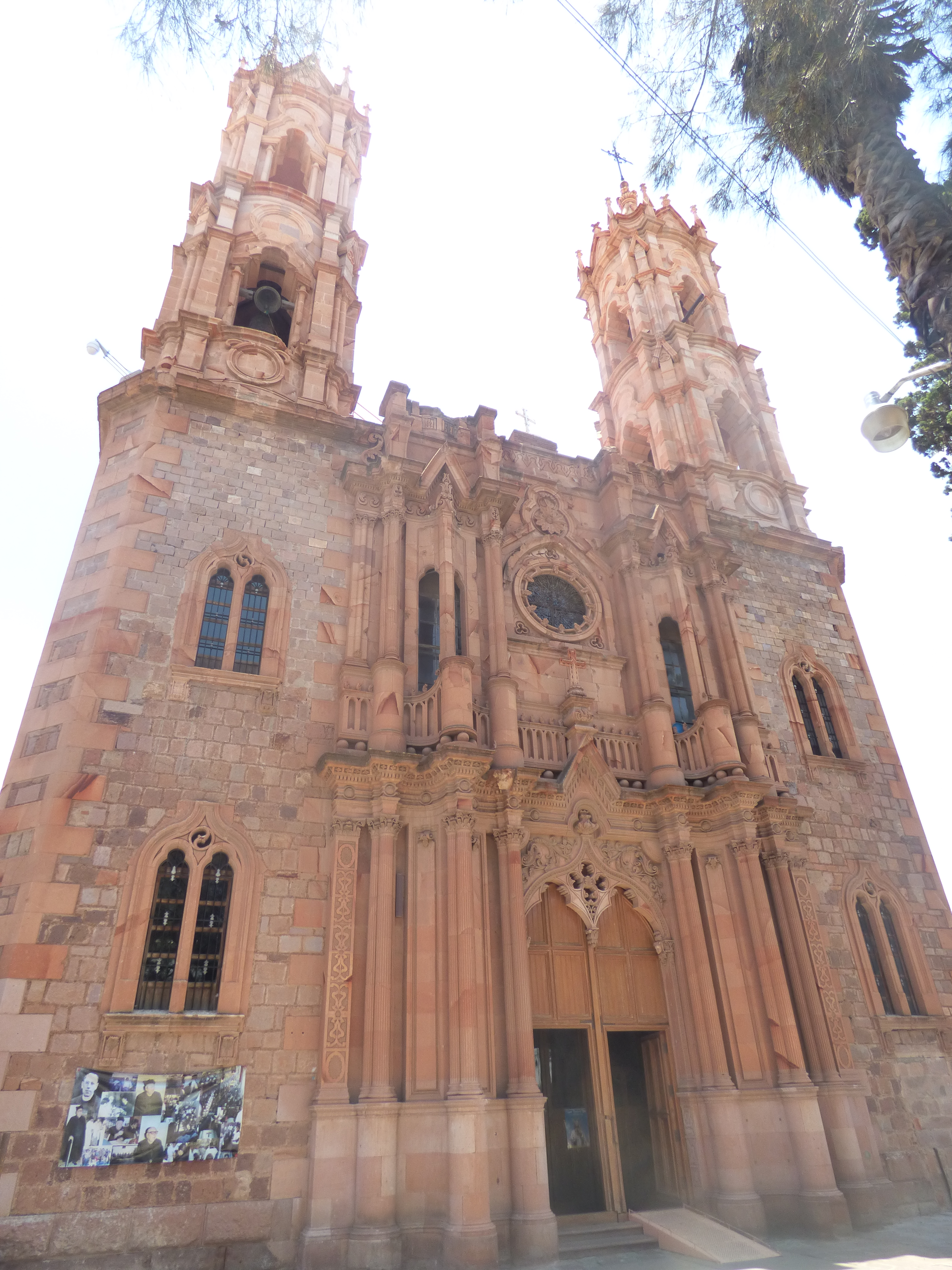
Santuario Diocesano de Nuestra Señora de Guadalupe (Guadalupito), Zacatecas.

==== Templo de Guadalupito ====
The first work of great magnitude carried out by Refugio Reyes was the Templo de Guadalupe in the city of Zacatecas, which was known as the sanctuary of Father Diaz, after Father Jose Anastasio Diaz Lopez, or "Guadalupito". The temple was started in 1891. The temple was promoted by the recent coronation of the Virgin of Guadalupe by the Mexican Catholic Church, for which remodeling, enlargements and construction of temples whose invocation was the Guadalupana were made. Refugio Reyes was chosen, probably because he already had experience in large-scale works, and also because of the links he had with the Franciscan community, for which he had already done some works.

The work was carried out in several stages and although, in the process, Reyes changed his residence to Aguascalientes, he continued to travel once a week to Zacatecas to supervise the work. In 1897 the main arch of the presbytery was finished and the cornice was placed.

However, the work lasted for several decades. In 1939 the towers were finished. Later, the presbyter José Campos Mota called Reyes, who was 77 years old, to supervise the arrangement of the atrium, the laying of the floor and the erection of the dome; works finished in 1940.

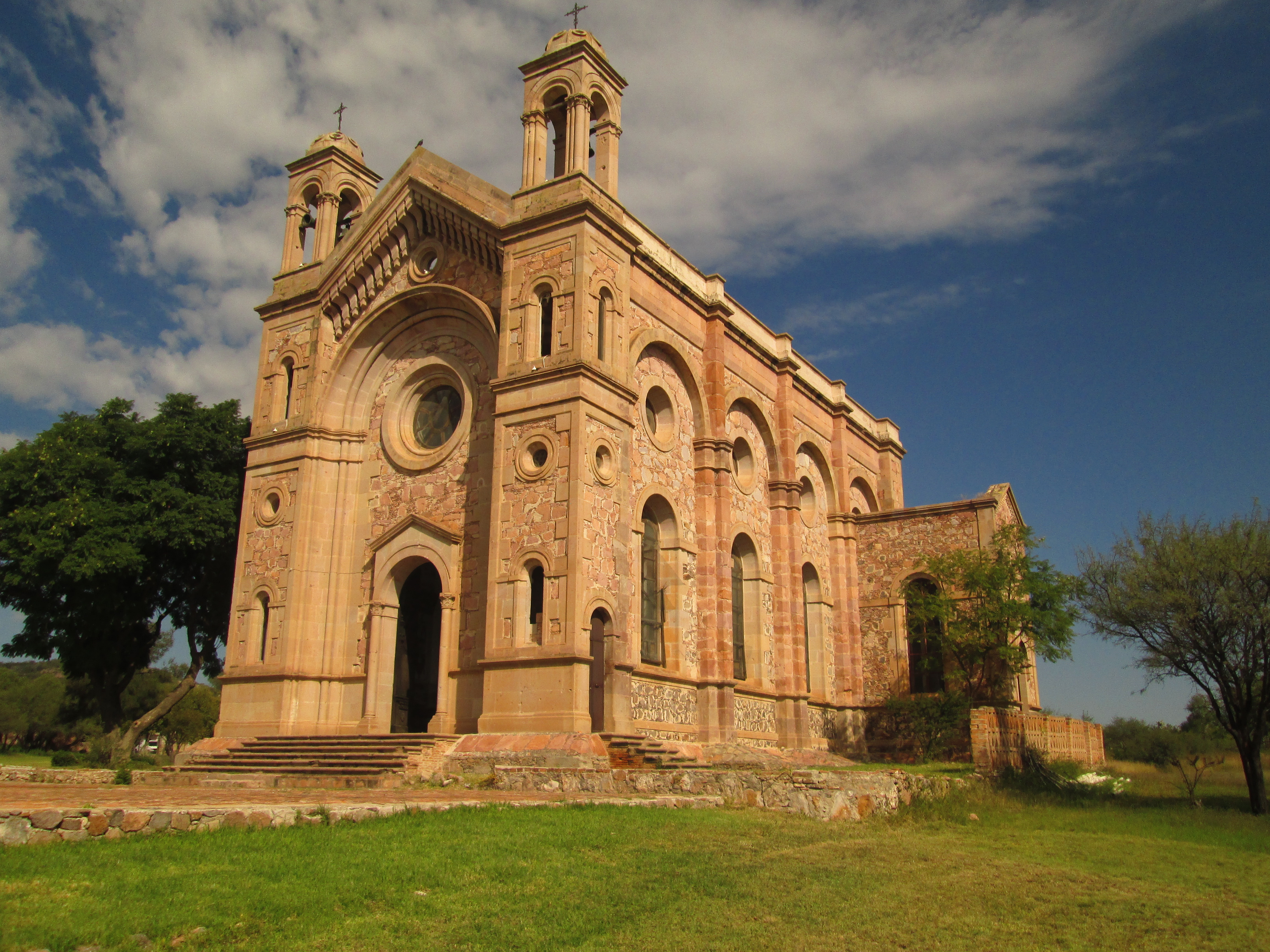
Templo de San Isidro Labrador in Pabellón de Arteaga, first work of Refugio Reyes in Aguascalientes.

=== Career in Aguascalientes ===
The constant and good work he did in Zacatecas made people from the ecclesiastical sector, especially from the Franciscan order, recommend the work of Refugio Reyes in the State of Aguascalientes. The first work he received in the state was the Templo de San Isidro Labrador in the Hacienda de Garabato, in 1893. At this time, Refugio Reyes could work in the neighboring city and live in his native Zacatecas, but when he was entrusted the project of the Templo de San Antonio in the capital of Aguascalientes, by the merchant and landowner Antonio Morfín Vargas, he decided to move with his family to his place of work. In all the commissions he had in Aguascalientes, he demonstrated a solid mastery of classical orders and techniques, as well as the use of any material, whether metal, wood, partitions or stone.

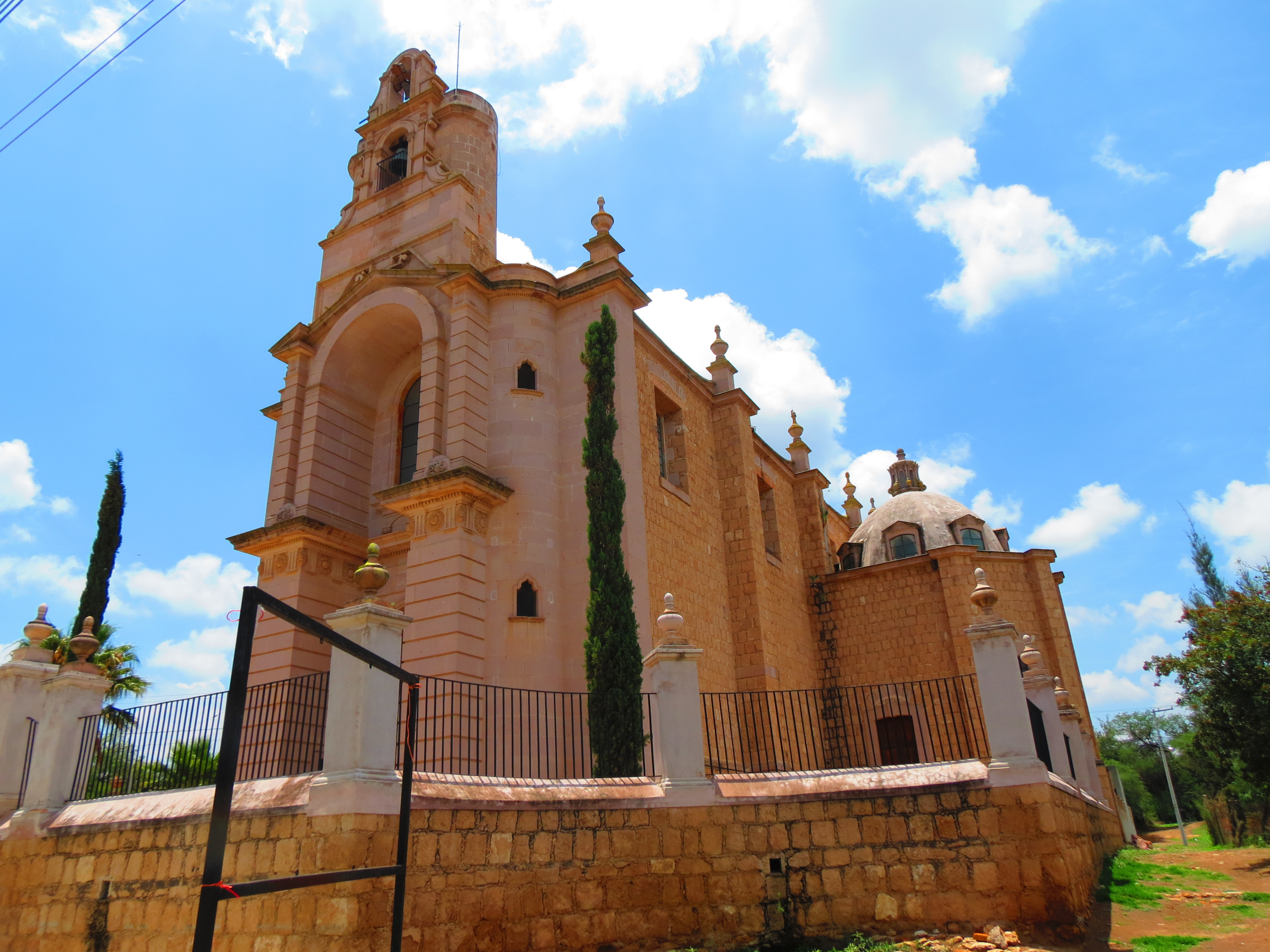
Templo de El Soyatal, El Colorado, Aguascalientes.

In 1897 he built the Chapel and the Casa de la Hacienda porfiriana El Soyatal, remarkable and original for its construction, execution and spatial conception. On June 18, 1902 he began work on the Templo de la Purísima Concepción. It seems that Reyes did not appreciate this work so much at the time he conceived it, since the fact was not recorded in his diary.

==== Public official ====
After several years in which the position of 'city engineer' had been abolished, Refugio Reyes obtained this appointment, as the municipal president, Felipe Torres considered it necessary. This title was also known as master of public works or director of public works.

After a long career as a builder, architect and designer, Refugio Reyes also participated in the political life of Aguascalientes as a public servant. According to some references, he worked in the City Hall since 1917 as Director of Public Works and, as of January 21, 1918, he received the appointment of "Master of Public Works". Somehow, he was able to combine these activities with his active participation in the creation of private works, both in the city where he lived, as well as in Jalisco and Zacatecas. His work as director of public works for 8 years was varied, since it depended extensively on the needs of the city in a time of economic upheaval, such as the supervision of the water box of the springs of Ojocaliente, the repairs in the conduction channels, orders to install drainage pipes, as well as to solve problems of waste from factories, such as La Perla.

In 1924, after the departure of Governor Rafael Arellano Valle, Refugio Reyes was involved in the struggle of political interests, since he was identified with the outgoing governor's administration, both in the public and private spheres, as he had designed and built his private house on Allende Street. (Note: The house was demolished.) Because of this, Reyes was attacked, and his removal from office was demanded.

The varied and numerous works attributed to Refugio Reyes have grown over the years, as many of his works are undated, unrecorded or demolished. Much of the architectural style of the city of Aguascalientes is influenced by the work of Refugio Reyes. His urban vision is also recognized, since part of the design of the city center, as in the case of the opening and ornamentation of Madero Avenue, as well as the numerous ochaves of his constructions that gave another perspective to the streets, are a hallmark of the architect.

=== Empirical architect ===
Although Refugio Reyes did not receive professional architectural training, his beginnings as a mason and stonemason allowed him to become involved in the creative aspect of construction. At the end of his life, thanks to the professional relationship he maintained with architect Federico Ernesto Mariscal Piña, Reyes came to handle architectural concepts at an academic level. One of his sources of reference was Vignola's treatise, where he copied and redrew the orders when he had to. His biographers point out that one of the characteristics of Don Cuco, as he was called during his lifetime, is that in spite of having been related to the academic field of architecture and also to terminology, his creativity was not altered or inhibited by the dogmatic orientation of preconceived styles.

Refugio Reyes was not the only self-taught architect in Mexico; Francisco Eduardo Tresguerras, the most representative architect of Celaya, Guanajuato, did not study architecture formally either. Likewise, it seems likely that there was an indirect influence of Tresguerras' architecture on Refugio Reyes, for like the Guanajuato architect, he occasionally used the central tower, contrary to the architectural tradition of the two towers. However, although both mixed different styles with the neoclassical, Tresguerras criticized the Mexican baroque unlike Reyes, who used it profusely and harmonized it whenever he could in his works.

One of the best known stories derived from Refugio Reyes' empirical apprenticeship has to do with the engineer Camilo E. Pani, who, in addition to questioning the resistance of the dome of the Templo de San Antonio, is said to have greeted Reyes with disdain, saying: "What's up, architect without a degree!", to which he replied: "Nothing, degree without an architect!"

Refugio Reyes' skill as an architect can also be seen in his drawings and pencil or ink strokes, which are meticulous and precise. This ability is attributable to his empirical training with engineers, from whom he learned that his drawings and designs on paper could be executable in practice, unlike the drawings of other architects, which have a certain looseness and spontaneity but no structural sense.

In 1913, the city of Aguascalientes was looking for an engineer to take charge of the city's public works, however, they decided that "it would not be possible to afford the expense of a qualified engineer, being barely possible to pay a practical individual", so they opted to hire Refugio Reyes. Since he did not have a higher degree that accredited his knowledge of architecture, Reyes received a low salary throughout his career, especially considering the responsibilities he had and the number of works in which he participated. As a consequence, he maintained the honest way of life that characterized him from his birth until the day he died.

In January 1985 he received the posthumous title of architect from the Faculty of Architecture of the Universidad Autónoma de Aguascalientes and on October 3, 2014 he was declared a favorite son of the municipality of Vetagrande, Zacatecas. He was also inscribed postmortem as a distinguished member of the Colegio de Arquitectos de Zacatecas and, from then on, the cultural hall of Vetagrande was named Refugio Reyes Rivas.

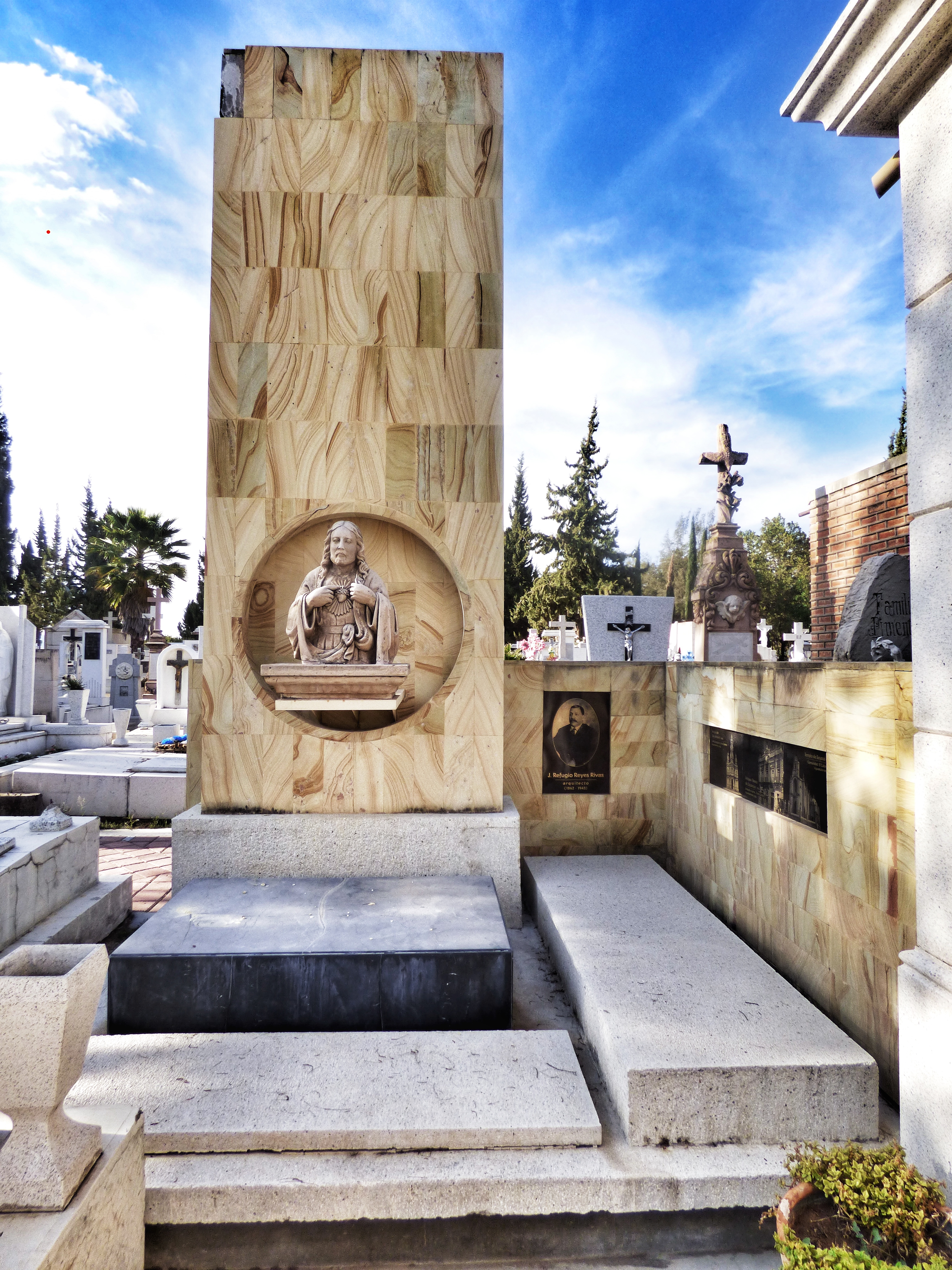
Tomb of Refugio Reyes Rivas in the Panteón de la Cruz, Aguascalientes, Ags.

== Last years ==
In 1937, Refugio Reyes suffered a stroke that paralyzed half of his body, and a few years later in 1941, his wife Felipa died of bowel cancer, so he spent his last years with his daughter Evangelina.

In 1942, with the help of a walking cane, he continued to travel everywhere and even took public transportation. He used to travel by train from Zacatecas to Aguascalientes, a 3-hour trip. The day before his death, Refugio went about his daily routine, he followed up on the work being done in Guadalupe, Zacatecas, and when he saw that the master builder had not paid the laborers, he made the corresponding payment out of his own pocket. On his return to Aguascalientes he told his daughter that his body ached. On Wednesday, February 3, 1943, he died at 7:00 p.m. at the age of 80. His vigil was held at his home on Juan de Montoro Avenue, and the religious service was held at the Templo de San Antonio. Later his remains were taken to the Panteón de la Cruz.

Víctor Manuel Villegas, the architect's first biographer, stated that his death had occurred in 1945, an erroneous fact that has been repeated on many occasions and even on a commemorative plaque next to the Templo de San Antonio. (Note: The indications of this error point to an unintentional misinterpretation by Víctor Manuel Villegas, which justifies this ambiguity.)

His tomb is located next to that of his wife, Felipa López de Reyes, in the Panteón de la Cruz. The statue of the Sacred Heart of Jesus that decorates the tomb was sculpted by Dionisio Rangel, a disciple and companion of Reyes.

== Homage to his work ==
In 1974, architect Victor Manuel Villegas published the first biography on the life and work of Refugio Reyes, entitled Arquitectura de Refugio Reyes. Manuel Villegas was an architect with a degree from the Benemérita Universidad Autónoma de Puebla and a member of the Instituto de Investigaciones Estéticas of the UNAM who, impressed by Reyes' work, traveled to Aguascalientes to investigate the unfinished works of the Zacatecan architect. After these visits, Villegas became a disseminator of Reyes' work, giving lectures in different institutions, including one that was organized on March 5, 1972 at the Casa de Cultura of Aguascalientes, entitled "The Architectural Tradition of Aguascalientes and the Work of J. Refugio Reyes" (Spanish: La tradición arquitectónica de Aguascalientes y la obra de J. Refugio Reyes).

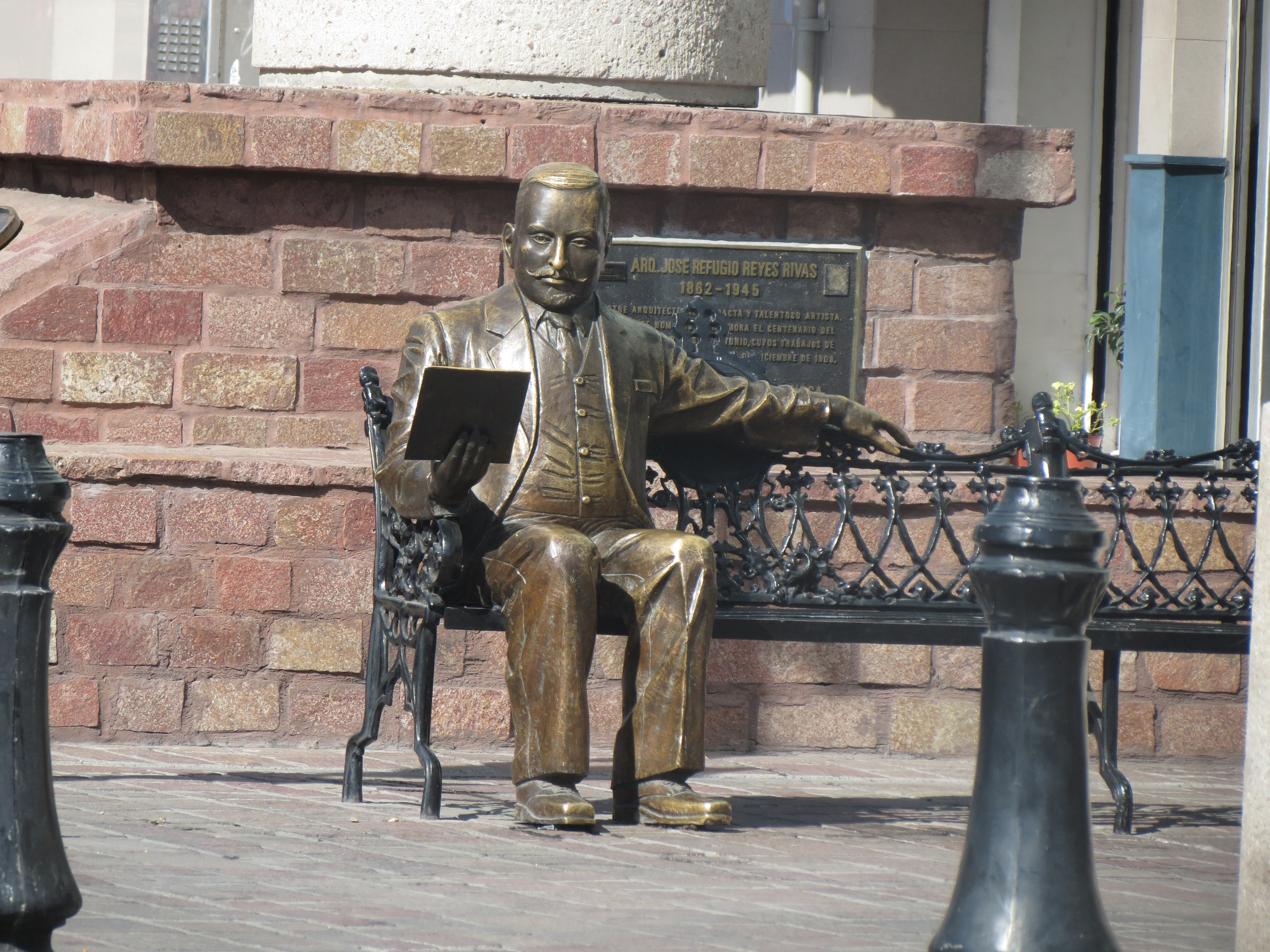
Bronze sculpture of Refugio Reyes Rivas, by sculptor Miguel López Artasánchez.

Villegas was the first to affirm that there was a link between the architectural tradition of Aguascalientes and Refugio Reyes, and praised his works, which became a posthumous tribute to the empirical architect.

In 1985, an exhibition was mounted in the J. Jesús Gómez Portugal Hall of the Institute of Science and Technology entitled "Aquel arte de construir" (The Art of Building). This exhibition was organized by José Luis Ruvalcaba and Benjamín Luna Vela. Plans, models, notebooks and photographs that belonged to Refugio Reyes were exhibited. At the event, Evangelina Reyes, the architect's daughter, was presented with a university degree recognizing her father as an architect honoris causa post mortem.

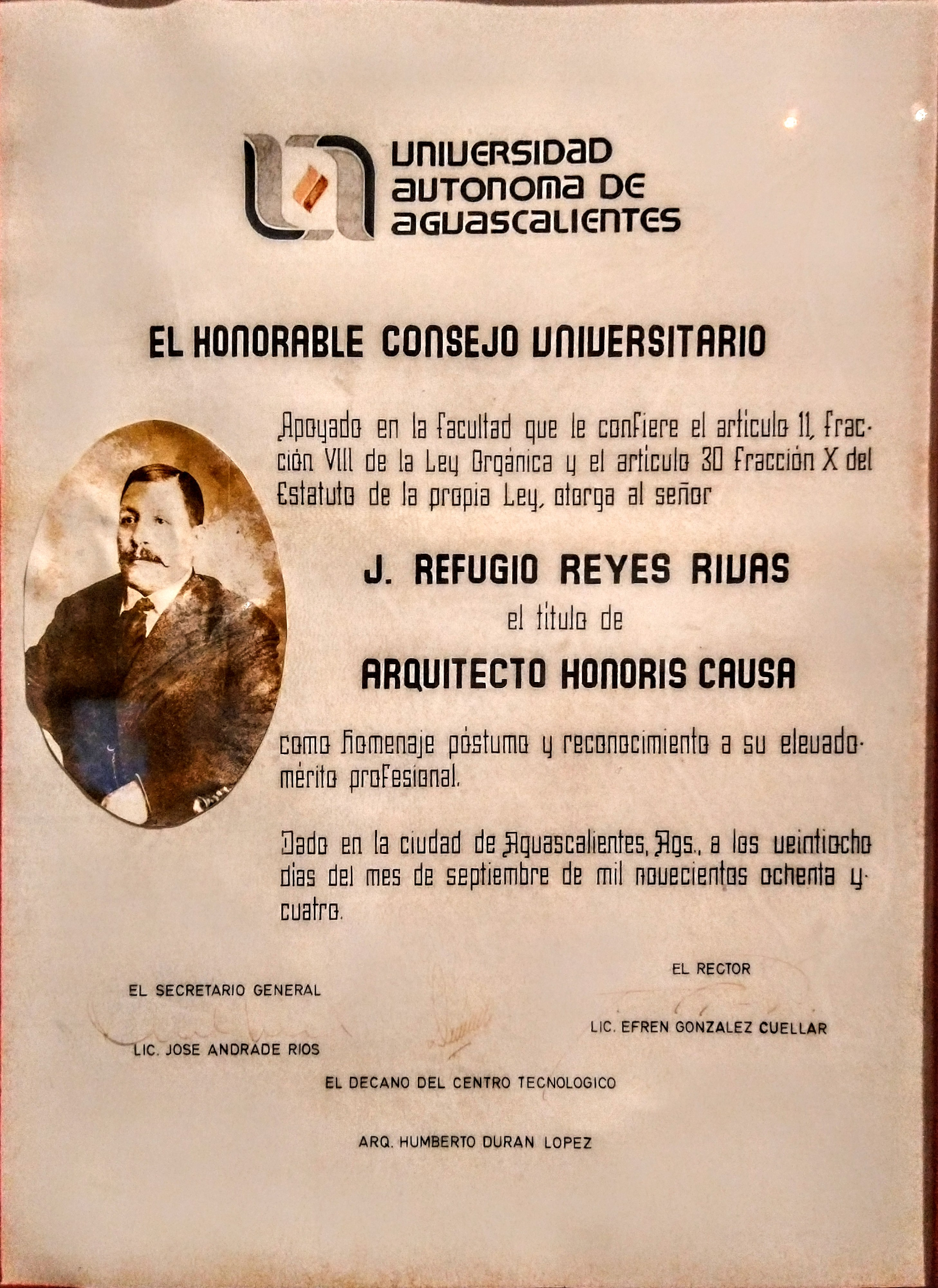
Honorary architect degree awarded by the Universidad Autónoma de Aguascalientes in 1985.

In 2008, the municipality of Aguascalientes celebrated the centennial of the Templo de San Antonio and recognized the work of Refugio Reyes Rivas by placing a bronze sculpture of the architect, commissioned to sculptor Miguel López Artasánchez. The work is located on Ignacio Zaragoza Avenue, in front of the Templo de San Antonio, designed by the emeritus architect.

At the end of 2013, the City Hall completed the restoration of the house that Refugio Reyes built and lived in, to turn it into a museum displaying the architect's models, plans, materials and furniture. Although it was inaugurated on December 30, 2013, at the end of the three-year term of Mayor Lorena Martínez, it remained inactive for the next two years. Finally, in April 2015, it was announced that it would not open its doors to the public due to budgetary problems of the municipal administration, and because the space did not have the conditions to establish a museum. In 2017, the house opened its doors, not as a museum, but as a cultural space for teaching crafts and imparting artistic workshops by the Instituto Municipal Aguascalentense para la Cultura (IMAC).

In 2018, Lidia Camacho, director of the Instituto Nacional de Bellas Artes, noted that two of Refugio Reyes' works, the Templo de San Antonio and the Templo de la Purísima, were in the process of becoming artistic monuments of the nation.

In December 2021, the exhibition Utilidad y deleite: Trazos de Refugio Reyes, curated by Andrés Reyes Rodríguez, was presented at the Museo Regional de Historia de Aguascalientes, with a series of objects, plans, photographs and drawings by Refugio Reyes himself, his family or people close to him. The purpose of the exhibition was to pay tribute to the architect by showing his professional and daily activities, and the relationship with his work. The exhibition was also presented at the Museo de Zacatecas in 2022, as part of the Zacatecas Cultural Festival.

== Main works ==
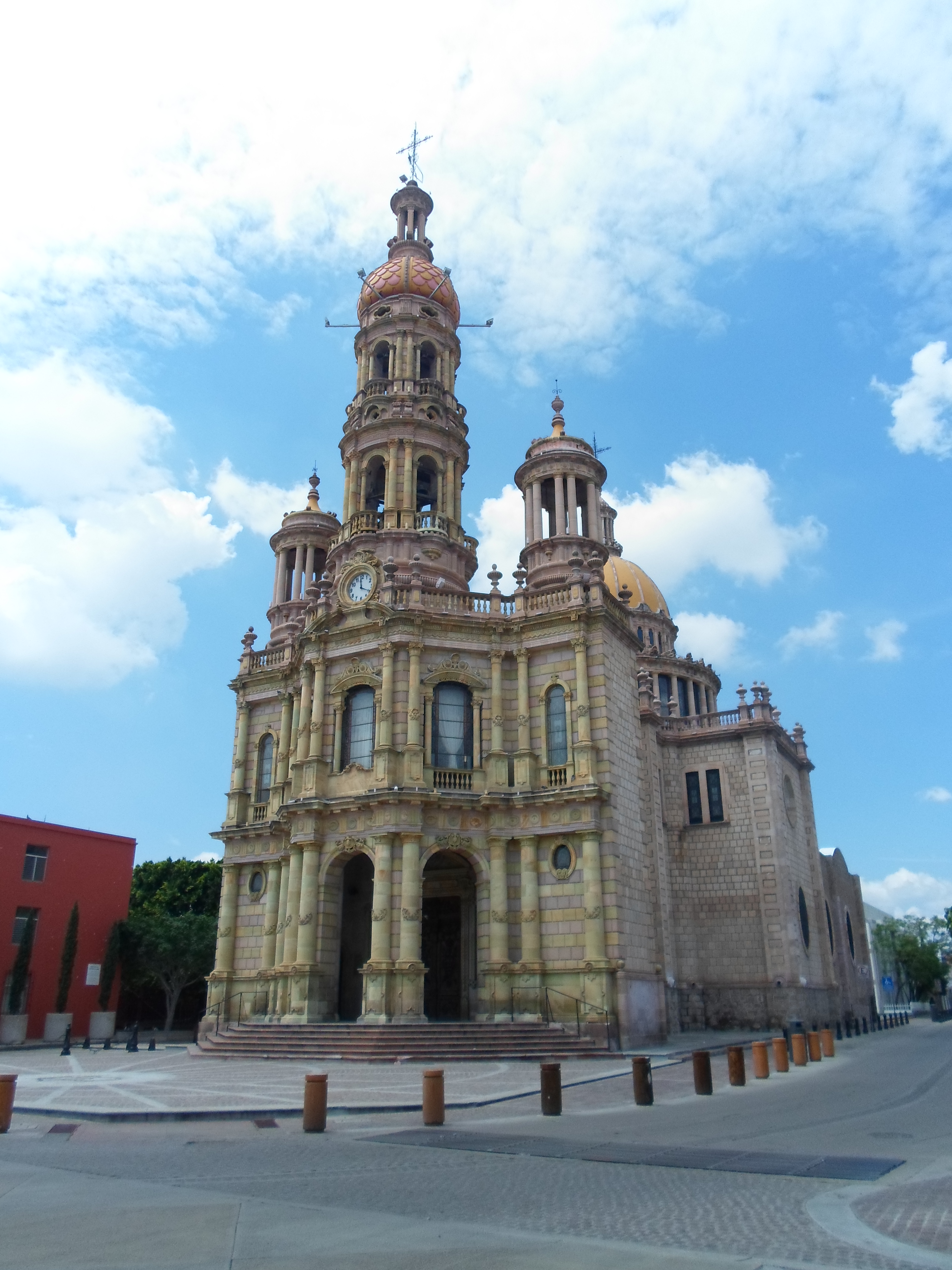
Profile of the Templo de San Antonio.

=== Templo de San Antonio ===
The first stone of the Templo de San Antonio was placed on October 4, 1895. It is the most emblematic work of Refugio Reyes and one of the symbols of Aguascalientes. It is considered a masterpiece of eclecticism, not only because of the mixture of styles, but also of epochs: from the 19th century because of the neoclassical motifs and from the 20th century because of its steel dome.

The project was commissioned by the Franciscan order of the city to the young architect Refugio Reyes, who had already shown signs of his talent in the neighboring state of Zacatecas. In his first attempt, he designed a Gothic style building that was not approved due to the estimated cost, 300,000 pesos of the time. Although Reyes' second proposal was approved and construction began in 1895, the project was cancelled due to budgetary problems. The owner of the Hacienda de la Cantera and the La Regenadora tobacco factory, Antonio Morfin Vargas, ordered the resumption of the work in September 1897 under the commitment to assume all the costs derived from the construction.

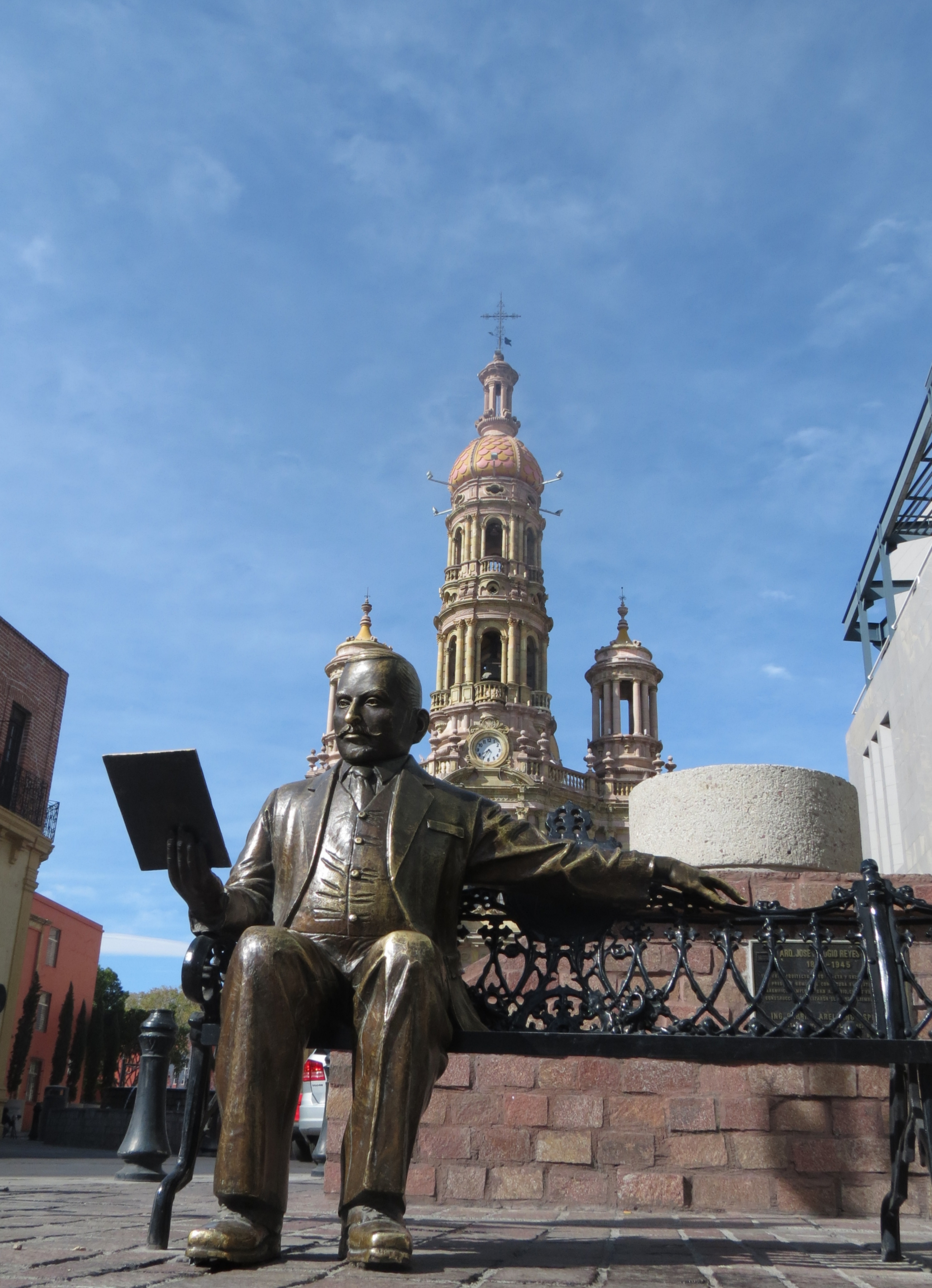
Monument to Refugio Reyes Rivas in front of the Templo de San Antonio.

One of the anecdotes surrounding this building happened in 1906, when the work on the temple was finished. The engineer Camilo Pani predicted that the dome would not resist and would succumb under its own weight when the scaffolding was removed. In response, Refugio Reyes asked his family to stand under the dome when the supports were removed. The dome held as Reyes had envisioned. José Luis Ruvalcaba attributes the success of the construction to the technological innovation Reyes achieved by placing the double-drum dome through a mixed construction system between the cutting of the stones with a series of metal rings based on rails. This gives the impression that the dome flies above the vault.

The structure of the temple is of Latin cross. The sacristy occupies the entire width of the temple up to the apse, in the image of the Jesuit churches. Also, within the construction, architectural solutions very characteristic of the Mexican and Hispanic tradition can be appreciated.

One of the most outstanding features of the building is its monumental verticality, reinforced by the central tower and its Byzantine dome. The tops that crown the two lateral turrets give it a Tempietto air. The columns present in the two bodies in which the facade is divided are neoclassical, as their capitals allude to the Greco-Latin canon. At the base there are Doric columns, in the middle there are Ionic columns and at the top is the originally called Corinthian order, which is actually a composite order. The double drum dome is perhaps reminiscent of the dome of St. Paul's Cathedral in London built by the architect Sir Christopher Wren, which reinforces the idea of the palette of styles that characterize the eclecticism of Refugio Reyes.

Inside, the paintings narrating the miracles of St. Anthony were conceived by Refugio's second cousin, the Zacatecan-born painter Candelario Rivas.

The value of the Templo de San Antonio lies not only in architectural aspects, but also in urban planning. Being placed in the break of the current Zaragoza Street, it works as a visual auction, especially for the verticality of its facade.

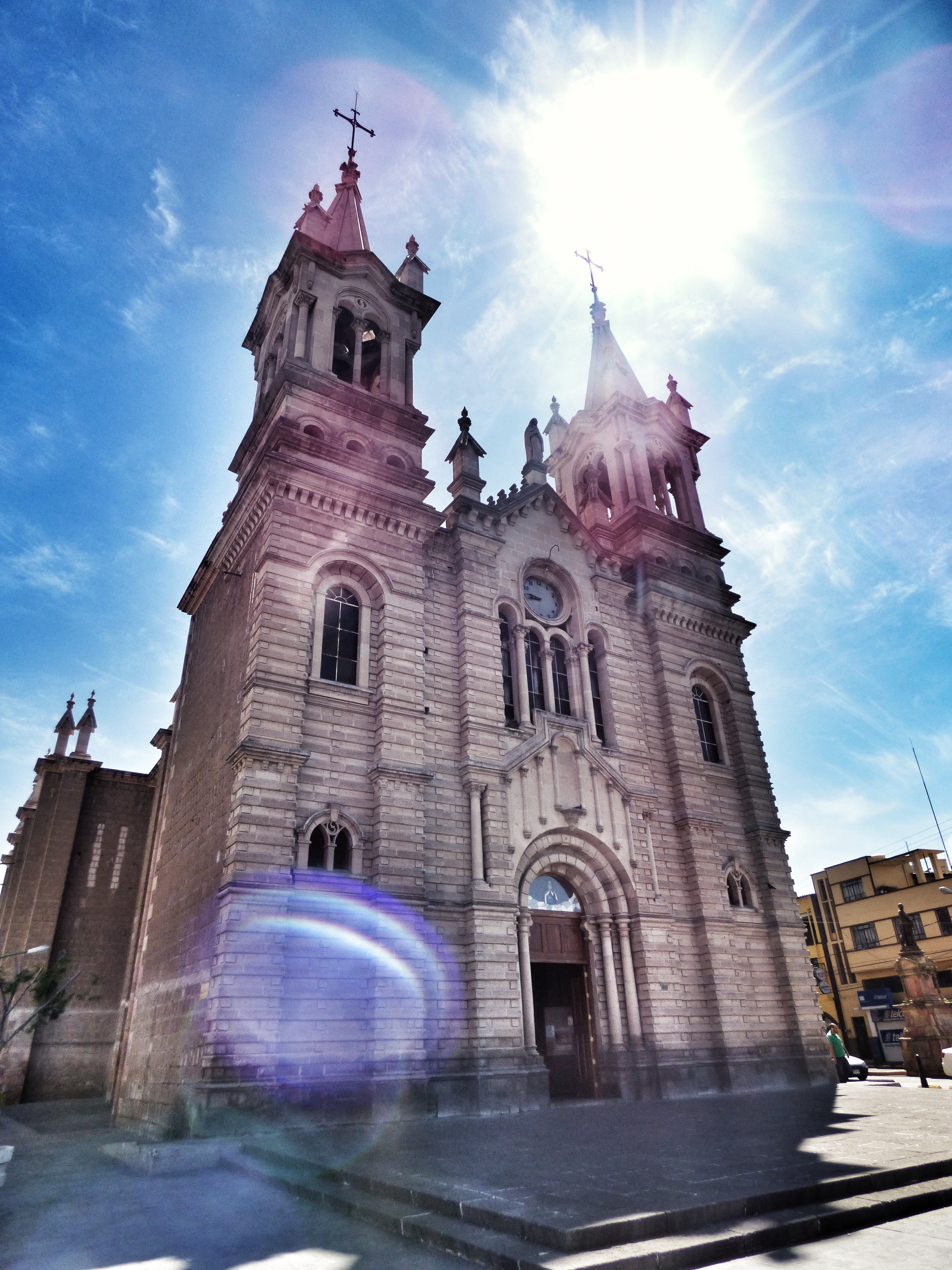
Façade of the Templo de la Purísima Concepción in Aguascalientes.

=== Templo de la Purísima Concepción ===
The Templo de la Purísima Concepción began to be built on July 18, 1902, according to Refugio Reyes himself in his work log. The Temple breaks with the tradition of the Latin cross plan, because taking advantage of the triangular shape of the construction site, the only nave was lengthened to finish it with three parallel ones, thus creating a basilica floor that surrounds the presbytery. This construction differs greatly from the Templo de San Antonio, because unlike the former, here sobriety and solidity predominate; although it is also an eclectic work that combines neoclassical and gothic elements.

The lighting work is remarkable, mainly because of the pointed arch windows and oculi at the top of the side walls, and also because of the semicircular arch windows in the doorway, which illuminate the choir.

By the 1970s, this work underwent an exhaustive restoration process. The roof vaults were on the verge of collapsing due to the low quality of the materials with which they were built. The architects José Luis Calderón and Bernardo Calderón saved the building, using the alms collected by the presbyter Salvador Jiménez.

=== Museo de Aguascalientes ===
This building has had several owners and different uses. At the end of the 19th century, Antonio Morfín Vargas sold it to the Días Portillo sisters, who built a Catholic School. At that time the building only had a patio and was built in adobe. The Sociedad Administradora de Bienes Raíces "La Esperanza" acquired the property on September 29, 1913. On December 1, 1914, according to the Law of Public Instruction, the building became the Normal School for Teachers through the intervention of Governor Alberto Fuentes Dávila.

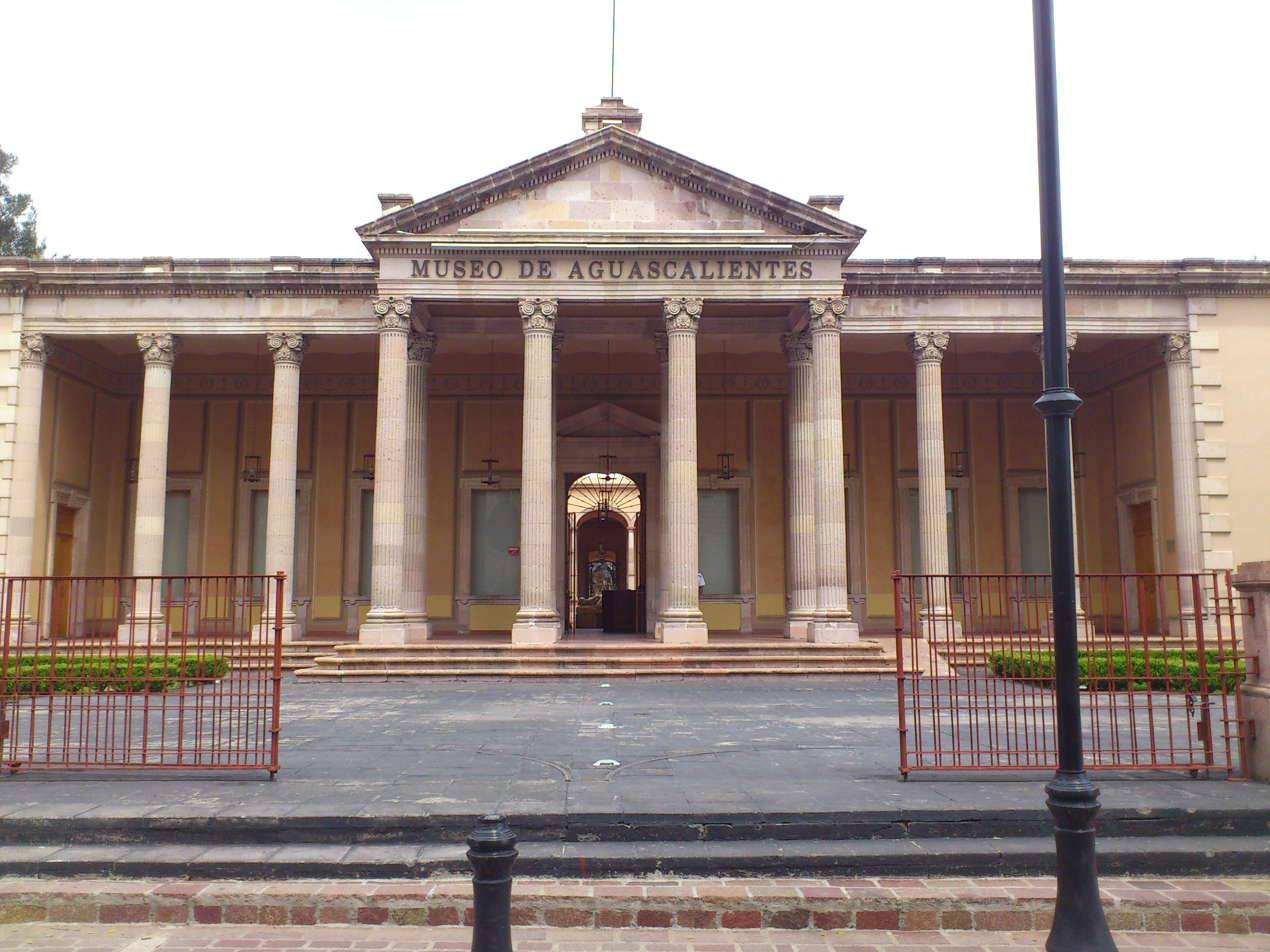
Façade of the Museo de Aguascalientes.

Later, during the administration of Governor General Martin Triana, Refugio Reyes was entrusted with the intervention of the building, which included a neoclassical portico, a second courtyard with ambulatories and rooms with the architect's personal touch.

In 1975 the building was acquired by the administration of José Refugio Esparza Reyes, who converted it into the Museo de Aguascalientes as part of the celebrations of the fourth centennial of the city. The current image of the building is due to the work of Refugio Reyes, as the author of its reconstruction and expansion.

For the time of the building, the neoclassical style may seem late, but it has the typology of a classic tetrastyle temple of compound order, which is well executed. In the interior of the building there are two patios with peristyles of slender columns, representative of the aguascalentense architecture of the time.

The importance of this building lies not only in its execution, but also in the collection it houses, especially that of two of the most representative artists of the city: Jesús F. Contreras and Saturnino Herrán.

=== Hotel Francia ===
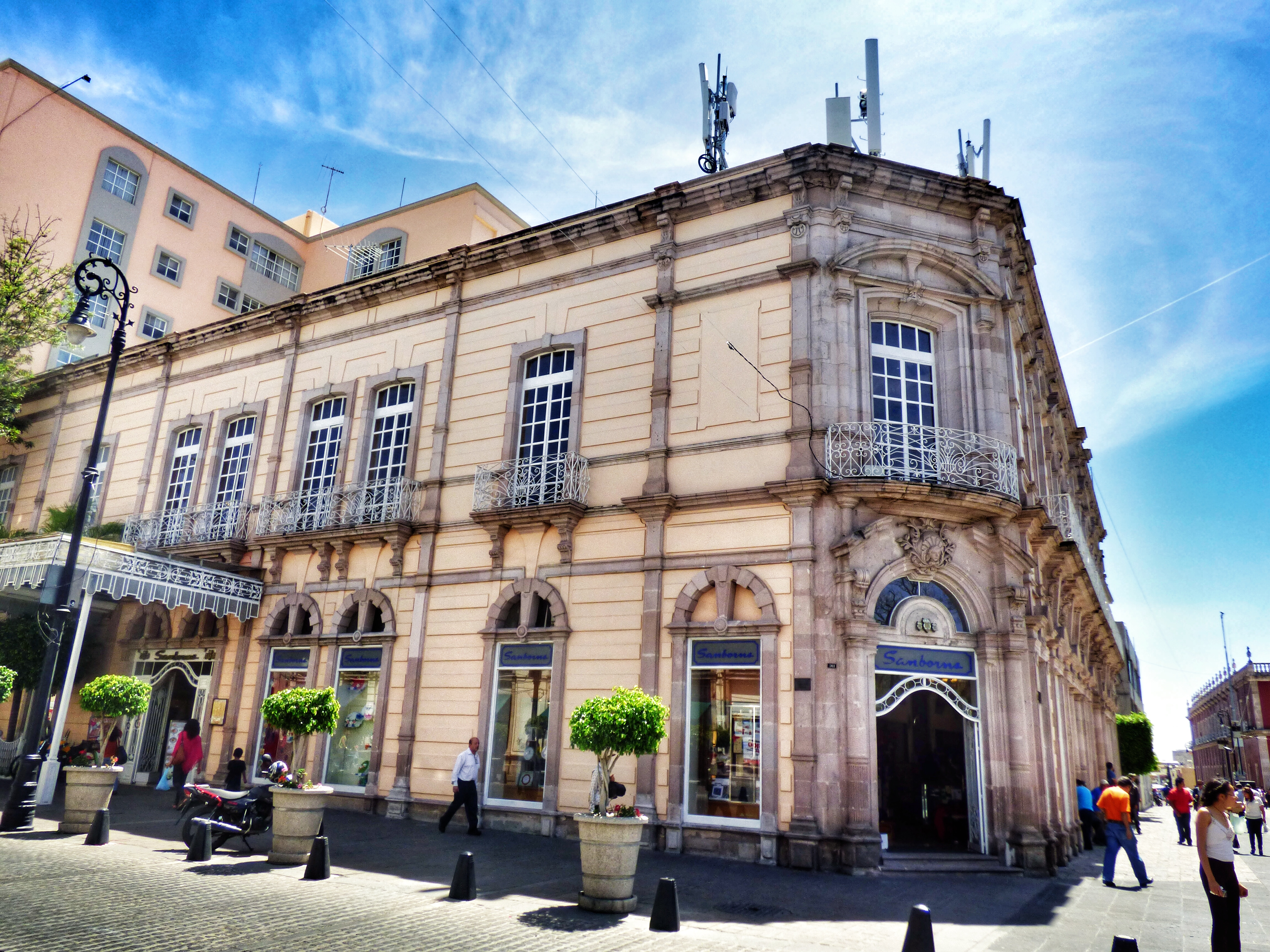
View of Hotel Francia (1915), later converted into a Sanborns store.

The Hotel Francia dates from 1917. Like so many of Refugio Reyes' buildings, it uses the octagon to center all the decorative elements on the corner. This gives the building twin facades and three entrances.

Located right in front of the Cathedral and the Plaza Patria, this characteristic building has diverse architectural elements, from baroque to neoclassical styles: broken pediments, semicircular arches, segmental arches and lintels with circular pediments, among others. In this building the balconies stand out for their artistic ironwork, as well as some French style details, with a worked and intricate masonry work in the columns, frames and lintels, as well as the craftsmanship, especially the reliefs of heads, such as the one in the corner opening of the facade, which is in an excellent state of preservation.

It is said that it was in the lobby of the hotel where Juan S. Garrido found the inspiration to compose the famous song "La pelea de gallos" on April 25, 1943, anthem of the Feria Nacional de San Marcos.

Since 1998 the building has been a Sanborns store, occupying the site of the original hotel. The first floor, which housed the Fausto Café, is now the restaurant of the well-known store.

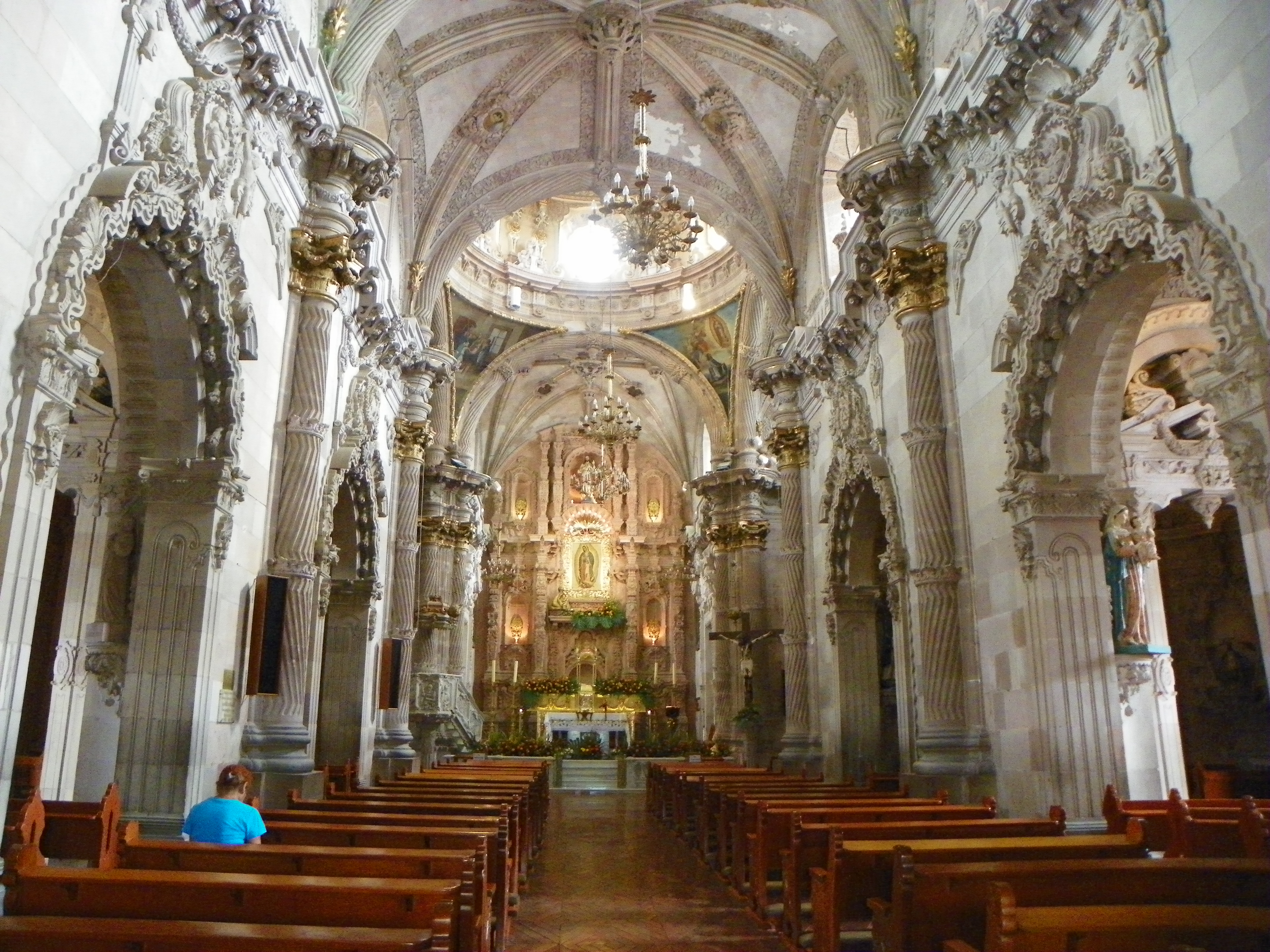
Templo del Santuario de Nuestra Señora de Guadalupe, Aguascalientes, Ages.

=== Santuario de Nuestra Señora de Guadalupe ===
It is a baroque temple of the 18th century that was intervened for the first time in 1907, by Refugio Reyes. The project that he presented in 1919 for the towers was discarded and in 1925 a project proposed by the Inspection of Artistic and Historical Monuments began to be carried out. In 1936 the architect Luis del Refugio Palacios began the execution of a new project that was soon discarded because it was about to collapse. Father Francisco Tiscareño then turned to Refugio Reyes to consolidate the new floor plan, of which no plans have been preserved. Reyes built the lateral naves of the sanctuary, as well as the cubes for the towers, executed in the 70's by an architect who respects Reyes' typology, Víctor Manuel Villegas.

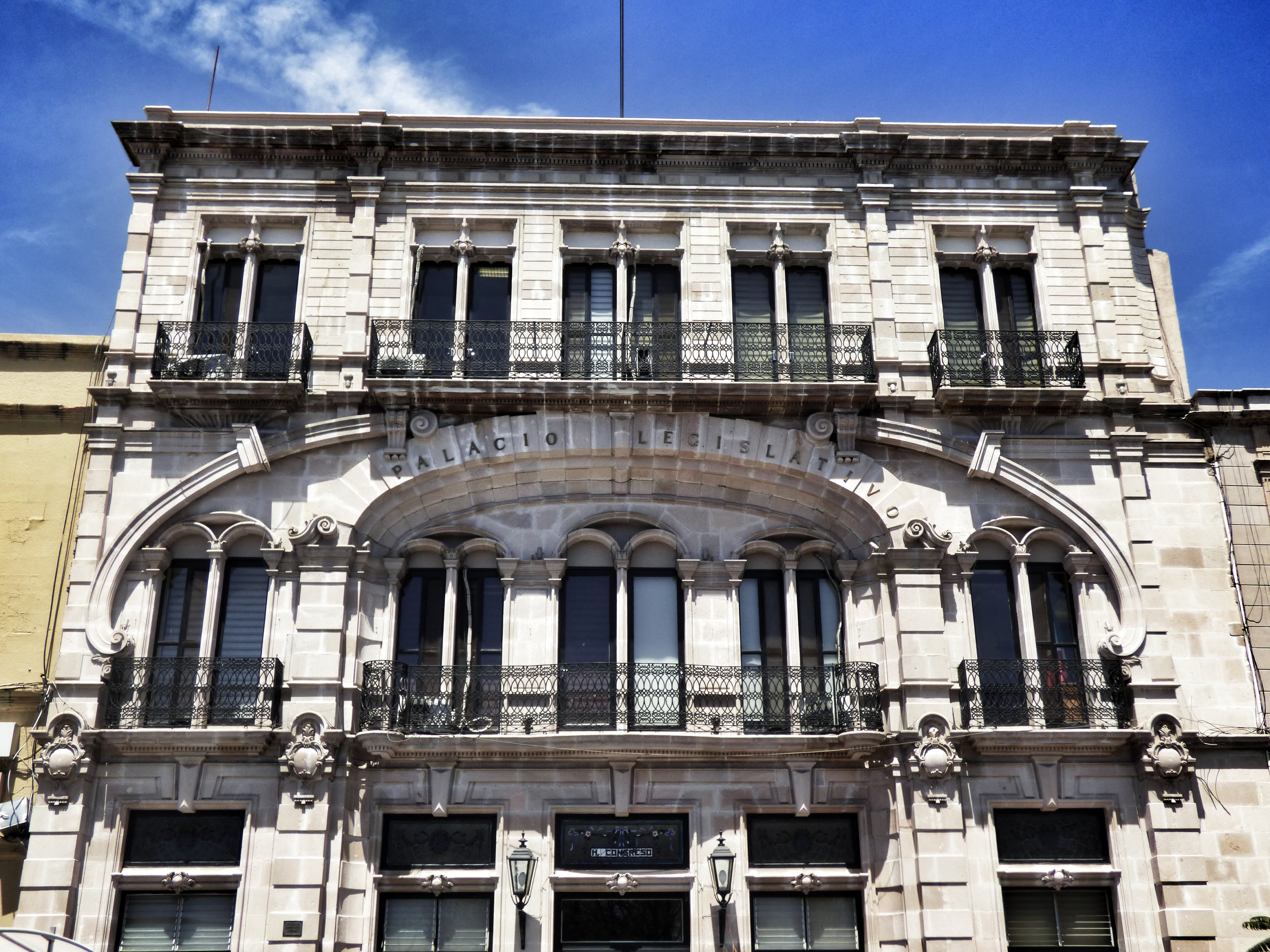
Facade of the Hotel París (1912), now the State Congress.

=== Hotel París ===
This building functioned since its construction, from 1912 to 1914, until 1982 as a hotel, year in which it became the State Congress. It is located in front of the Plaza Patria and is one of the most emblematic buildings of Refugio Reyes Rivas.

It has a three-story façade made of pink quarry stone. As is common in Reyes, it occupies the neoclassical style in combination with art nouveau. The main entrance has two floors and is in the form of a niche. The second level has balconies with double-hung windows in the shape of a bifora. On the third level there are rectangular windows and cushioned walls. The interior has Doric columns and a staircase with balusters very typical of the neoclassical style.

This hotel received among its guests Francisco Villa, revolutionary leader, and other generals during the Convention of Aguascalientes of October 1914. Later, presidents Miguel Alemán, Adolfo López Mateos and Gustavo Díaz Ordaz, as well as artists such as Mario Moreno "Cantinflas", also stayed in this hotel.

== Chronology of works ==
The following lists contain information about the book En Aguascalientes Refugio Reyes se revalora:

In Zacatecas
Work	Year	Participation of Refugio Reyes and description	Image
Chapel of Nápoles	1878	Located in Guadalupe (Zacatecas), Refugio Reyes participated in the decoration of the chapel.	
Casa de Father Sánchez	1878	Private house located in Guadalupe. Reyes participated as a mason and stonemason.	
Entrance doorway and portico of the Hospice of Guadalupe	1880	Reyes made the entrance doorway.	
Mercado de Guadalupe	1885	Market located in Guadalupe. The design was in charge of Carlos Suárez Fiallo, Refugio Reyes participated in it.	
Clock Tower, Templo de Guadalupe	1886	This was his first formal commission. In this work he combines the neo-Gothic and Mudejar styles with the Baroque of the temple's façade.	
Mercado Jesús González Ortega	1888	Located in the capital of Zacatecas, Reyes worked on its construction and later took over the direction to finish the building.	
Altars of the Templo de San Francisco	1890	Temple located in Zacatecas. The architect participated in the elaboration of the altars.	
Santuario de Guadalupe in Zacatecas or Guadalupito	1891	Reyes participated in all the stages of the construction, which was suspended when Father Anastasio Díaz, in charge of the work, died. He would later continue to supervise the work until the end of his life.	
Sculpture of Cuauhtémoc	1893	Located in Zacatecas. It was part of a set of sculptures for a house that is in front of the Templo de Santo Domingo.	
Chapel of the Hacienda Río de Medina	1898-1901	Chapel of Saín Alto. Neoclassical work. Construction of the façade and completion of the chapel.	
Templo de San Francisco de los Adame	1907-1941	Temple dedicated to the Sacred Heart of Jesus located in Luis Moya (formerly San Francisco de los Adame). Reyes designed the dome, the entrance to the atrium and the chapel tower of the hacienda. Refugio himself noted that he began the tower project in 1940 with the economic support of Delfina Castorena.	
Chapel of the Hacienda de Tacoaleche	1941	Located in Guadalupe, this work began two years after his death, so it was not finished by him.	

In Aguascalientes
Work	Year	Participation of Refugio Reyes and description	Image
Templo de San Isidro Labrador	1893	Located in the Hacienda de Garabato, it was the first construction commissioned to Refugio Reyes in Aguascalientes, where he erected a work in a single nave that ends in an apse.	
Templo de San Antonio	1895	It is the most famous and representative building of Refugio Reyes, in which a great number of styles coexist.	
Hotel Washington	1896	Remodeling of the hotel, first of its kind in the city. Later it became the Colonial Cinema and, after its demolition, the south and north facades were rescued, which are now part of the Plaza Fundadores.	
El Soyatal	1897	Located in the Hacienda El Soyatal, it is very similar to the Iglesia de San Isidro Labrador, Garabato. In this work, Refugio Reyes creates a sturdy, solid construction with flared arches.	
Tower of the Templo de Nuestra Señora del Rosario	1900	5 years earlier a lightning strike had collapsed the two upper bodies of the tower, which had been previously damaged during the Guerra de Reforma (Reform War). The repair of the tower, in neo-Gothic style, was completed in 1906.	
Templo de la Purísima Concepción	1902	Unlike other churches built by Refugio Reyes, this one has a basilica floor. It is characterized by its sobriety and solidity.	
Archivo Histórico del Estado	1902	Building remodeled by Refugio Reyes, in which he built a corridor around the first patio. The roof is supported by slender metal columns.	
Casa Refugio Reyes	1903	In 1903, Refugio Reyes acquires a house near the center of the city, which had only one floor in brick, so he made an extension. It currently houses the Museo "Refugio Reyes Rivas" (Refugio Reyes Rivas Museum).	
Panteón de la Cruz	1903	One of the main features of the pantheon, the pink quarry stone portico in the shape of Omega (Ω), was designed and built by Reyes. The portico that connects the Panteón de la Cruz with the Panteón de los Ángeles, as well as various funerary monuments in both cemeteries, were designed and executed by Refugio Reyes.	
Banco Nacional de México	1905	Officially the project was in charge of engineer Samuel Chávez, since Reyes lacked a university degree. However, it has several characteristics that are present in other of his buildings. It is a neoclassical building and the main entrance has an eave, which gives it a perspective to the street.	
Casa de Manuel Flores	1905	It was designed in a neoclassical style.	
Banco de Zacatecas	1906	Its basic structure is neoclassical, but mixes Renaissance elements. The first floor is Doric and the second floor is Ionic.	
Altar of Nuestra Señora del Refugio	1906	This is a neo-Gothic style work made of yellow quarry stone inside the Templo del Señor del Encino. Refugio Reyes made the portico of this temple, as well as the wall and the access to the atrium, which is related to the one he built in the Convent of Guadalupe in Zacatecas.	
Altar of the Cathedral and Cypress	1907	The Cypress is of neoclassical style and is carved in white Carrara marble. He also participated in the remodeling of the precinct, enlarging it from one to three naves, in which he used flared arches that give it greater depth.	
Juan de Montoro, no. 425	1917	This is a house with the traditional central courtyard layout.	
Templo de San Diego	1908	Reyes built a lateral nave that borders the cloister of the ex-convent. For this work he used semicircular arches. He was also in charge of building two lateral altars.	
Morelos Street, No. 309	1908	The façade has two levels and is made of pink quarry stone. Each level has seven openings. Inside, its layout presents the classic central patio.	
Baths of Ojocaliente	1908	Also called Ancient Baths of Ojocaliente or Great Baths, they were intervened by Reyes. In the access portico he placed a three-point arch and also rounded the façade.	
Escobedo Mansion	1908	This is a two-story French style building. It has some neoclassical characteristics and a central courtyard layout.	
Museo Regional de Historia de Aguascalientes	1908	Refugio Reyes remodeled the patio and the façade. The building has a neoclassical style, although the arches of the facade are art nouveau. In addition, in the interior there is a neo-Gothic style chapel.	
Casa Alfonso Esparza Oteo, Allende 238	1908	Dwelling house designed and built by Refugio Reyes. It has a neoclassical style with a central courtyard. It was the house where the composer Alfonso Esparza Oteo was born. In 1980 it became the Music Department of the Universidad Autónoma de Aguascalientes, and in 2004 it was acquired by the State Government, becoming the CIELA Fraguas (Centro de Investigación de Estudios Literarios de Aguascalientes).	
Hotel París	1910	The eclectic style between neoclassical and art nouveau is due to the intervention of Refugio Reyes.	
Hacienda de Cañada Honda	1910	It has semicircular arches in the corridor, elaborated with yellow quarry stone of Cavellinas. Some elements of the hacienda have elements of the Sauceda, native community of Reyes.	
Monument to the Centennial of the Independence	1910	Placed in the commemoration of the centennial of the Independence of Mexico, this obelisk is made of yellow quarry stone and is dedicated to the natives of Aguascalientes who participated in the insurgent movement. It is composed of three bodies: the square base with scrolls in the corners; the prism-shaped body with four columns that have a Corinthian capital in which are inscribed the names of some insurgents such as Pedro Parga, Santos Ortega, José Calvillo and Matías de Lara; and an obelisk that emerges from a cornice with a central half circle where a medallion with a floral crown is engraved. The obelisk has vegetal elements, such as laurel branches and elements that allude to the homeland, as well as a pyramidal shape at the top.	
Templo de Cristo Rey	1911	A building created with apparent partition walls.	
Cathedral Chapter	1913	The particular facade was built with pink quarry stone; it has horseshoe arches that give it a touch of Mudejar reminiscence, but also reminiscent of art nouveau.	
Hotel Regis	1914	It has two levels that combine neoclassical and art nouveau styles.	
Casa de Ignacio Ortiz	1915	The house is of yellow quarry stone with a fundamentally sober neoclassical style.	
Hotel Imperial	1915	This building, dating from 1560, has undergone several modifications. In the time of Refugio Reyes it was used as a casino, so it was given its characteristic style.	
Hotel Francia	1915	This famous hotel, formerly owned by Felipe Nieto, was remodeled in 1915 under the order of Refugio Reyes, who combined diverse construction and ornamental styles to complete the project.	
La Casa de la Gardenia	1915-1919	Since the 1980s this building has served as the Jaime Torres Bodet Library. It was originally built to house the establishment of José and Luis G. Laris, called "La Gardenia". In this building, like others, the ochave was used in the corners; it also has a central courtyard.	
Castillo Douglas	1917	One of the versions is that the businessman Juan Douglas ordered the construction of a medieval style house with the architect Federico Ernesto Mariscal Piña; but the latter accepted under the condition of having a good master builder to take charge of the construction. He finally chose Refugio Reyes, who was able to put his particular stamp on this work.	
Chalet Douglas	1917	This house, designed by an engineer named Wolf, was built next to Castillo Douglas. Reyes would be in charge of carrying out this project which, unlike the castle, has a neoclassical style with elements characteristic of Reyes, such as the quarry stone trim on doors and windows.	
Mercado Terán	1918	Now disappeared. It had segmental arches supported by Tuscan quarry columns.	
El Número 8	1918	The building served as a house and warehouse, and later became a store. In 1991 the State Government transformed it into the Museo de Arte Contemporáneo (Museum of Contemporary Art). The building is built in the shape of an ochave, where the main door is, so it has two facades with few decorative elements.	
Hidalgo Hospital	1920	Inaugurated in 1903, its construction was completed in 1920, when the upper floors were finished.	
Santuario de Nuestra Señora de Guadalupe	1920	It is a baroque construction of the 18th century, intervened for the first time in 1907, by Refugio Reyes.	
Museo de Aguascalientes	1920	Refugio Reyes was in charge of the renovation of the building as well as the construction of the second patio, as it is known today. In those years it was the State Normal School.	
Palacio Municipal de Calvillo (demolished)	1921-1925	The governor of Aguascalientes at that time, Rafael Arellano Valle gave great impulse to the infrastructure in the municipality of Calvillo, so he requested a municipal palace to Refugio Reyes. The façade had two sections and five entrances. The second body had a cornice on which there were five windows. The central window had a broken curved pediment. The building had a pyramidal crest. It is not known why the building was demolished, but it was replaced by the one that currently serves the same purpose.	
La Popular	1923	This building was a store called "Compañía de Abarrotes La Popular", which was remodeled by Refugio Reyes. Before this remodeling it had only one floor.	
Teatro Cine Palacio	1925	It was ordered to be built by Roberto Barnola. Part of the payment that Refugio Reyes received for its construction was a lifetime pass, which he used until his death. In 1943 this building burned down.	
Casa Enrique Osornio Camarena	1932	From 1932 to 1936, Enrique Osornio Camarena was the Constitutional Governor of Aguascalientes. When he began his term of office, Refugio Reyes built this estate that combines neoclassical style with art nouveau.	
Sindicato Ferrocarrilero	1939	It was commissioned by Governor J. Concepción Rodríguez (1939-1940). Although Refugio Reyes presented a French style project, the execution required a functionalist style building, very modern for the time.	
Casa de Allende 224	n/d	Reyes remodeled and rebuilt the interior of the house, which later became the Guadalupe Victoria School and later the Language Center of the Instituto Cultural de Aguascalientes.	

In other States
Work	Year	Location	Participation of Refugio Reyes and description	Image
Templo de Nuestra Señora de Guadalupe	1908	Encarnación de Díaz, Jalisco	The temple was begun by Heraclio Jiménez on March 15, 1867, but was retaken by Refugio Reyes in 1908, who designed the vaults and the dome.	
Altar of the Parroquia de la Misericordia	1911-1912	Ocotlán, Jalisco		

== Gallery ==
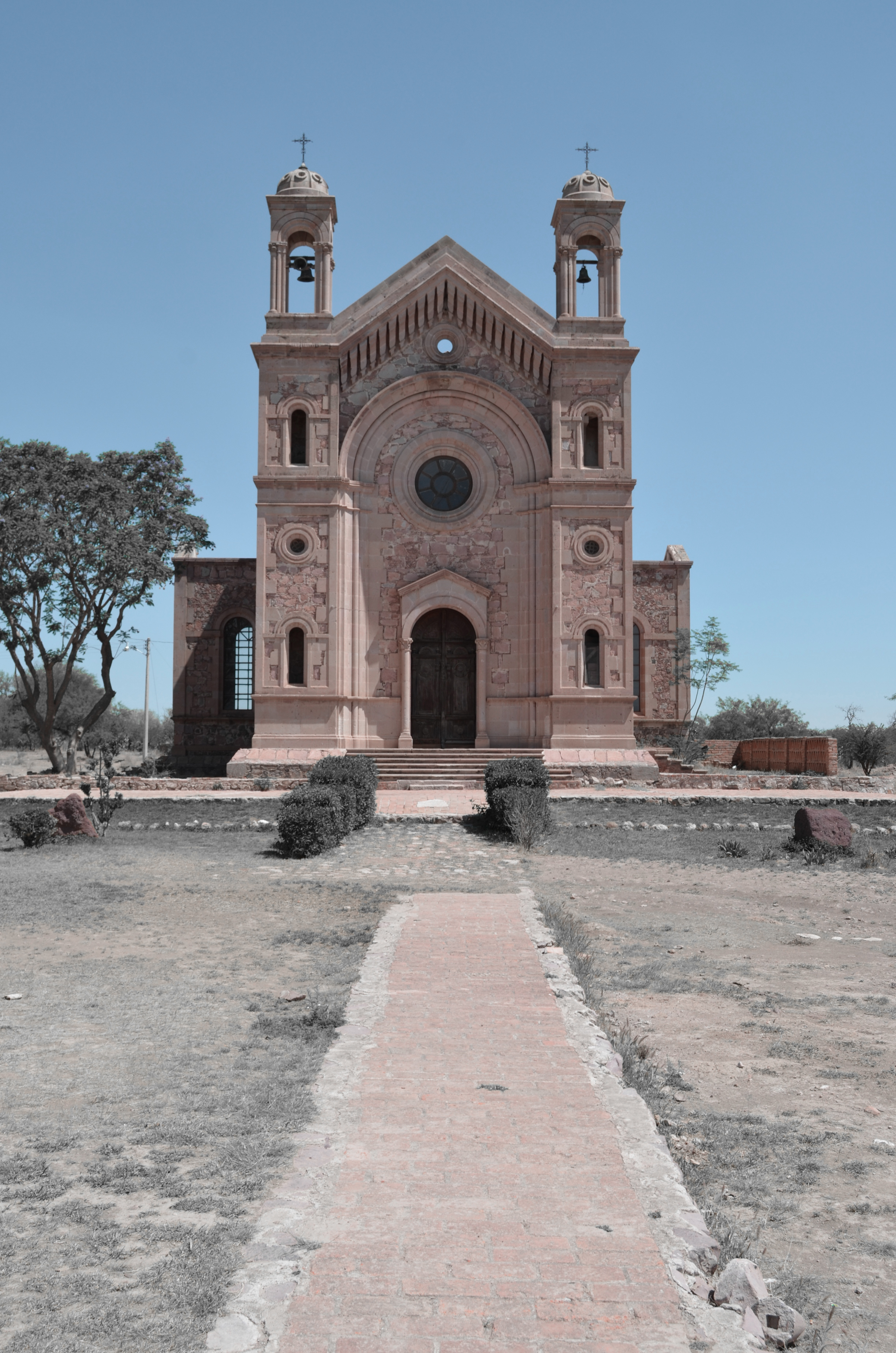
Templo de San Isidro Labrador (1893), Hacienda de Garabato, Ags.

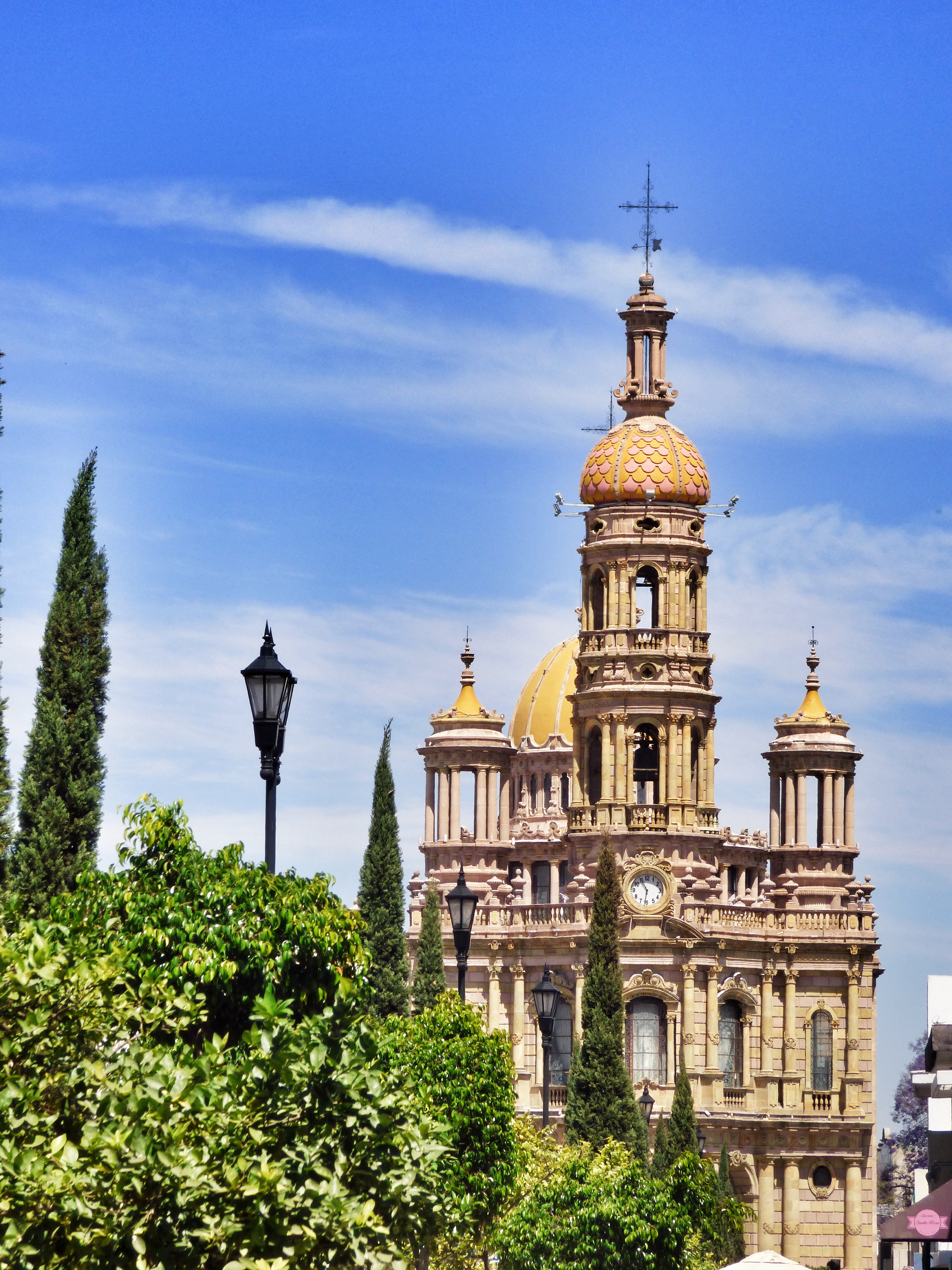
Templo de San Antonio (Aguascalientes), 1895.

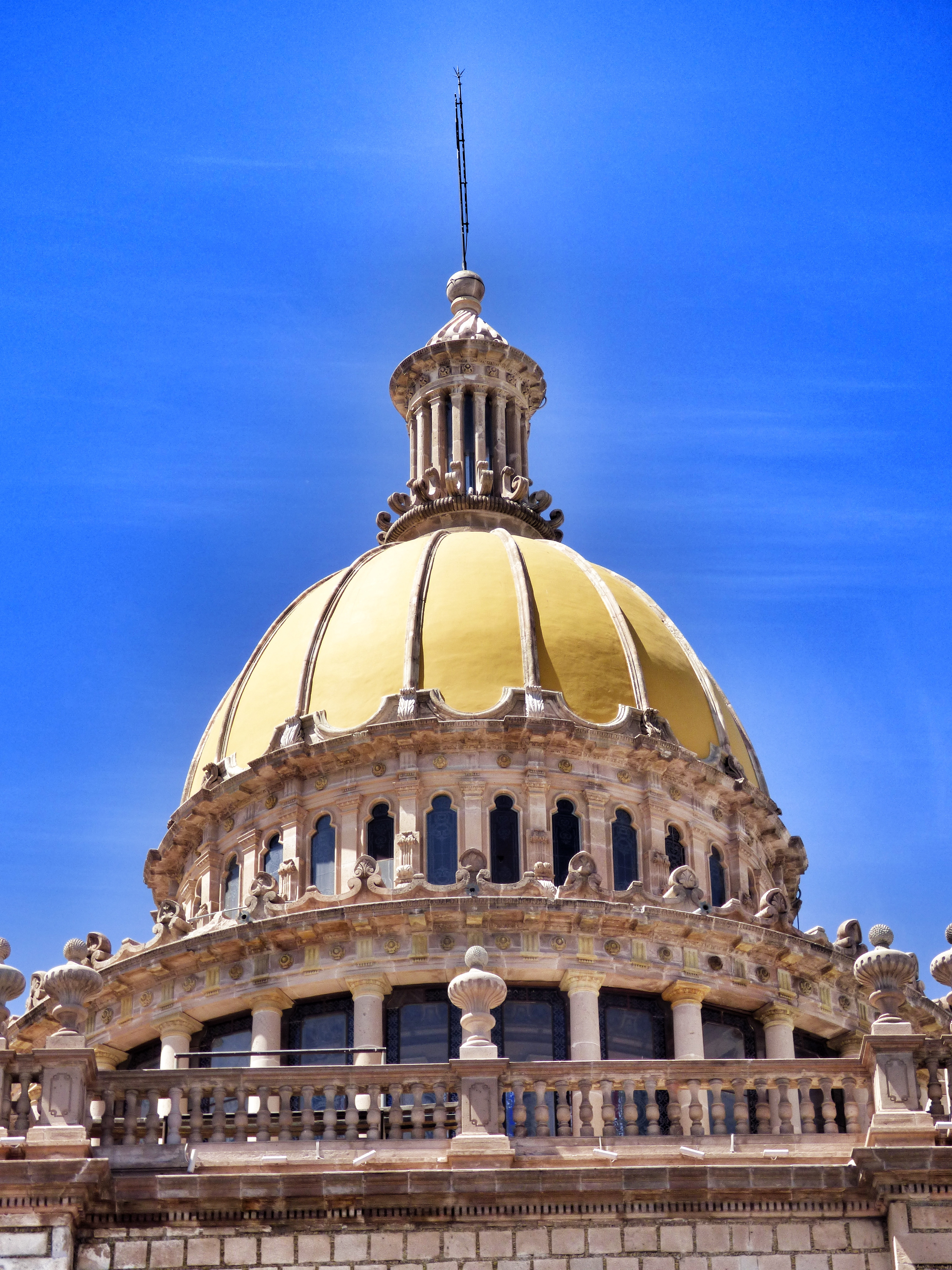
Double drum dome of the Templo de San Antonio, 1895, Aguascalientes, Ags.

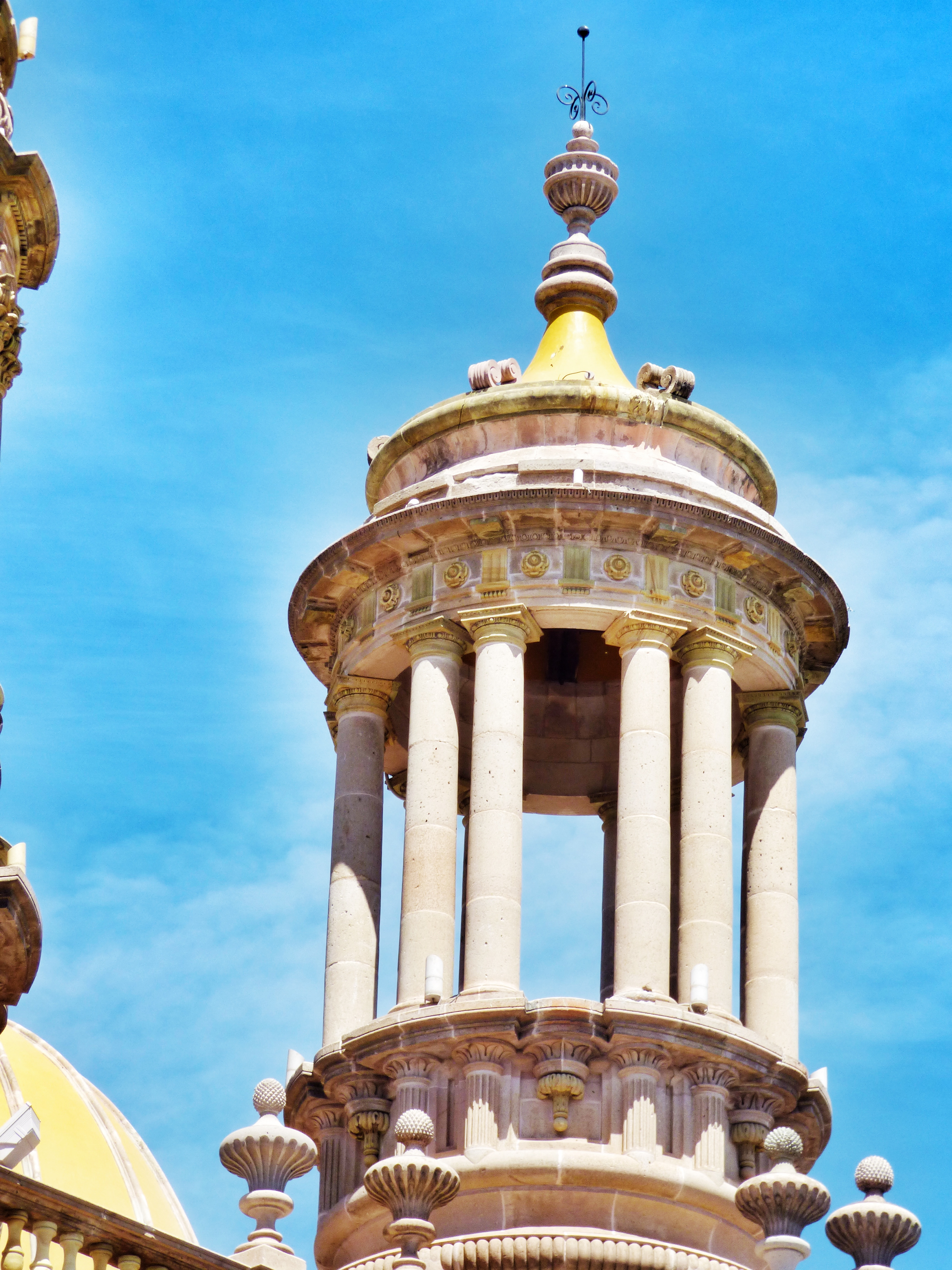
Detail of one of the two turrets of the Templo de San Antonio, 1895, Aguascalientes, Ags.

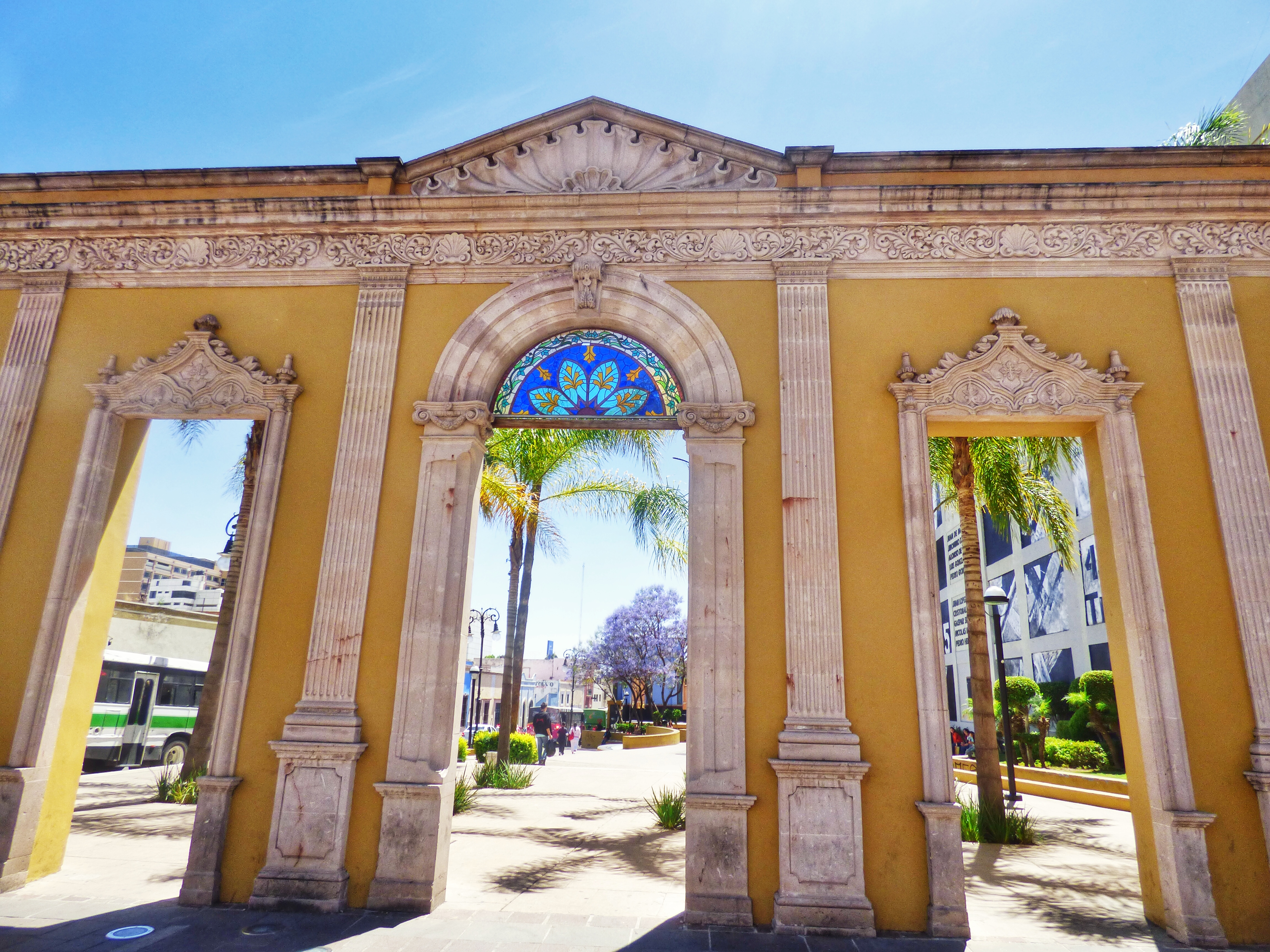
Façade of the Hotel Washington (1896), Aguascalientes, Ags.

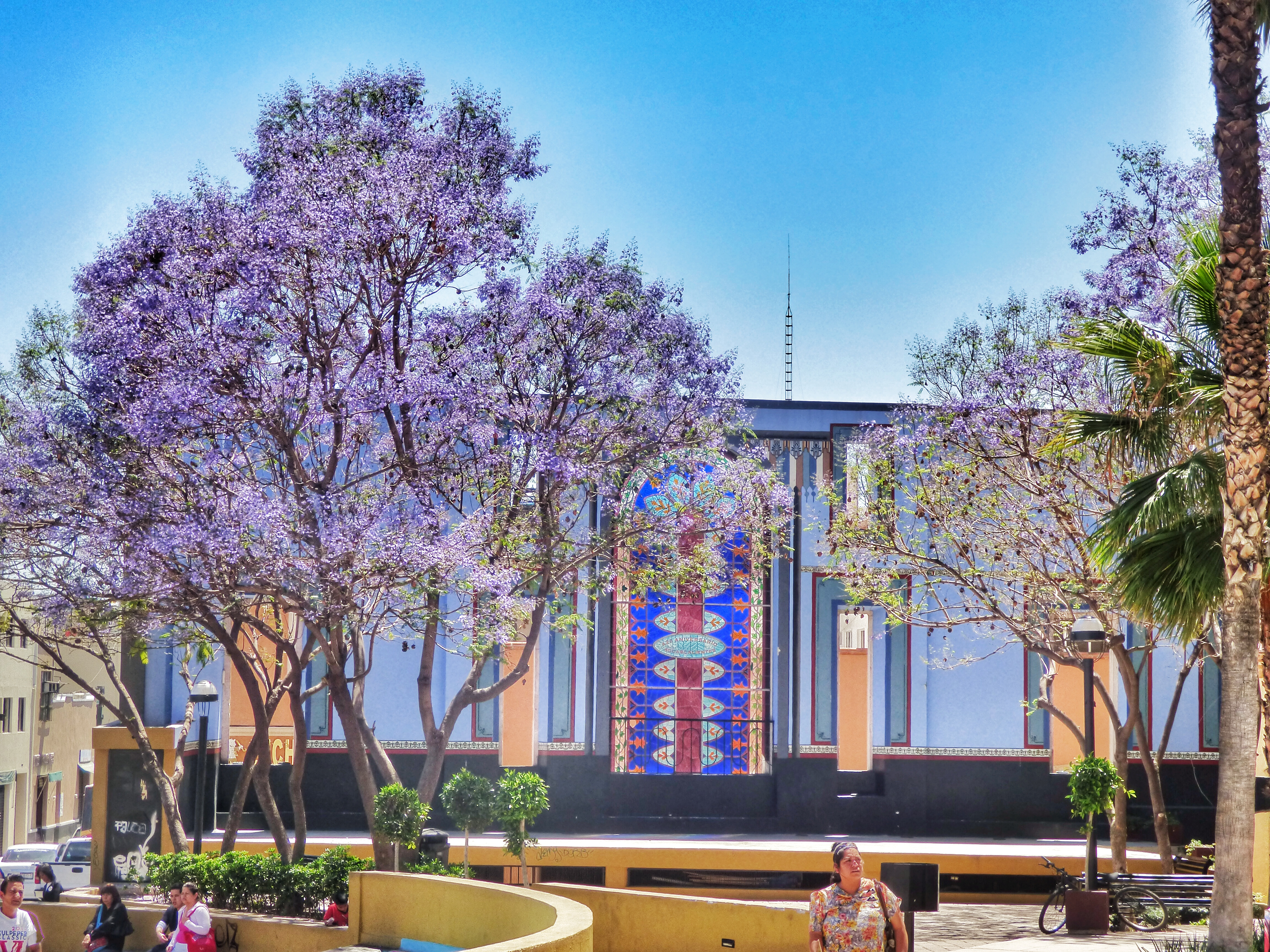
Inner façade of the Hotel Washington (1896), Aguascalientes, Ags.

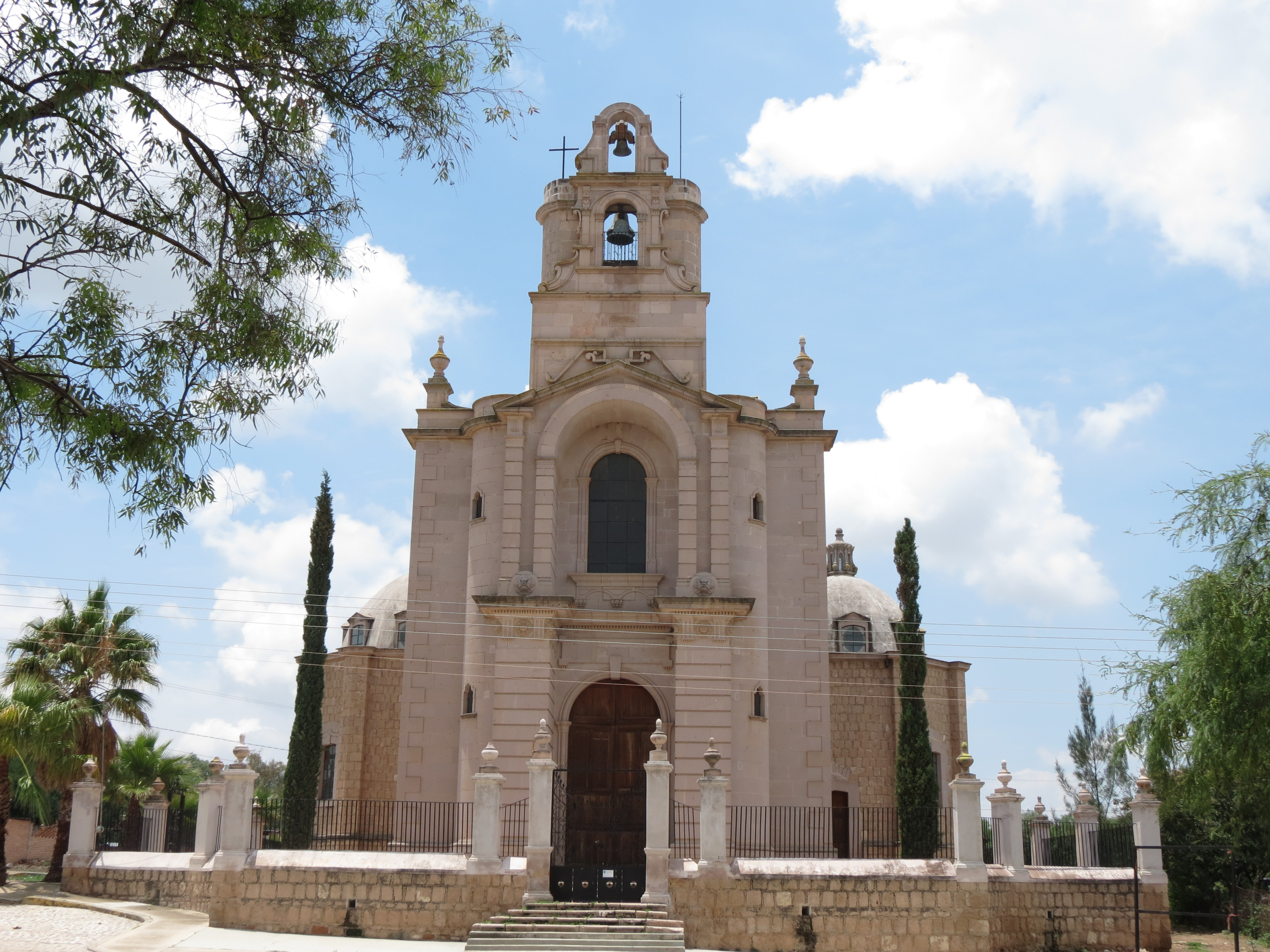
Templo de El Soyatal (1897), Aguascalientes.

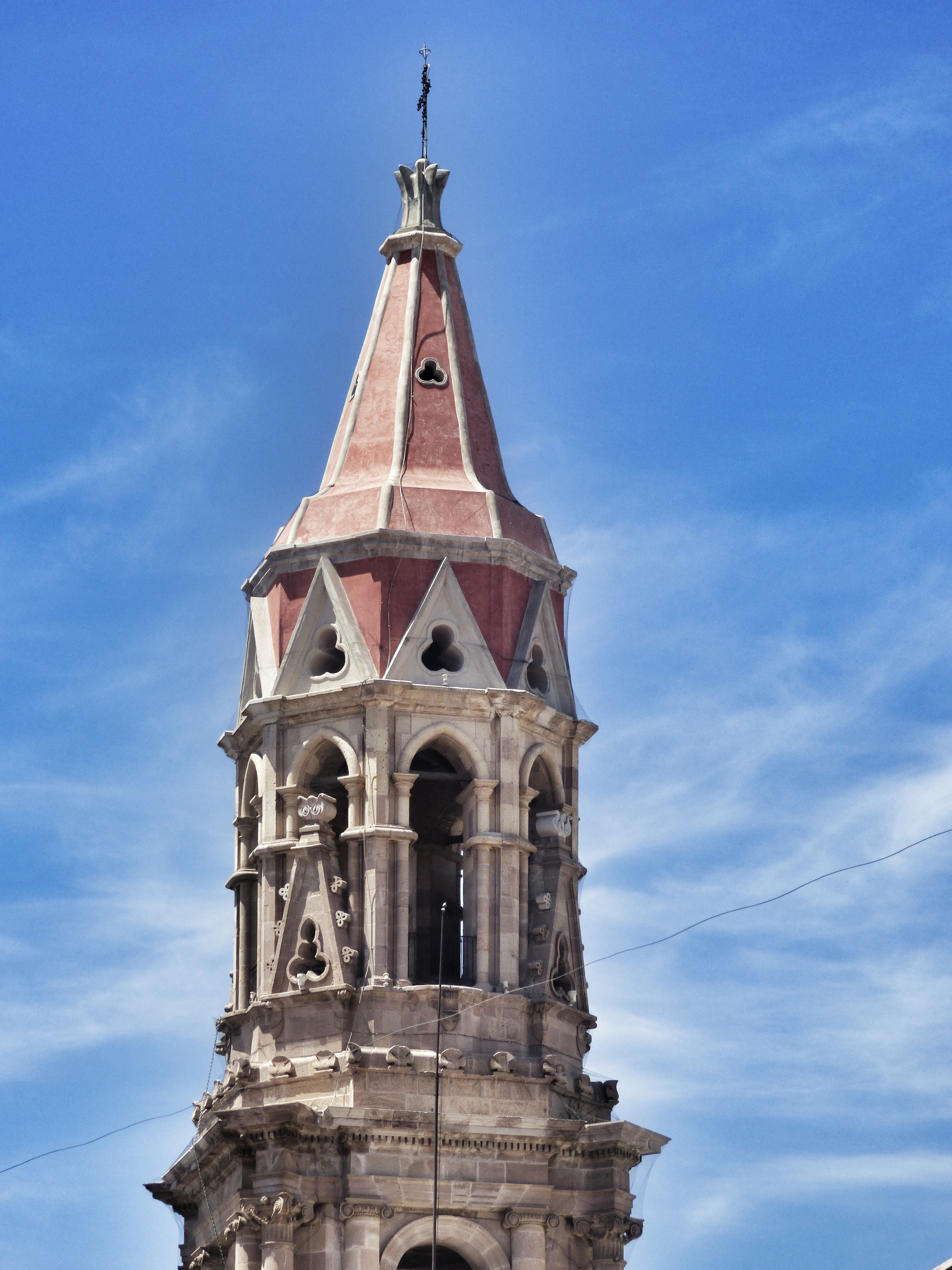
Tower of the Templo de Nuestra Señora del Rosario (1900), Aguascalientes, Ags.

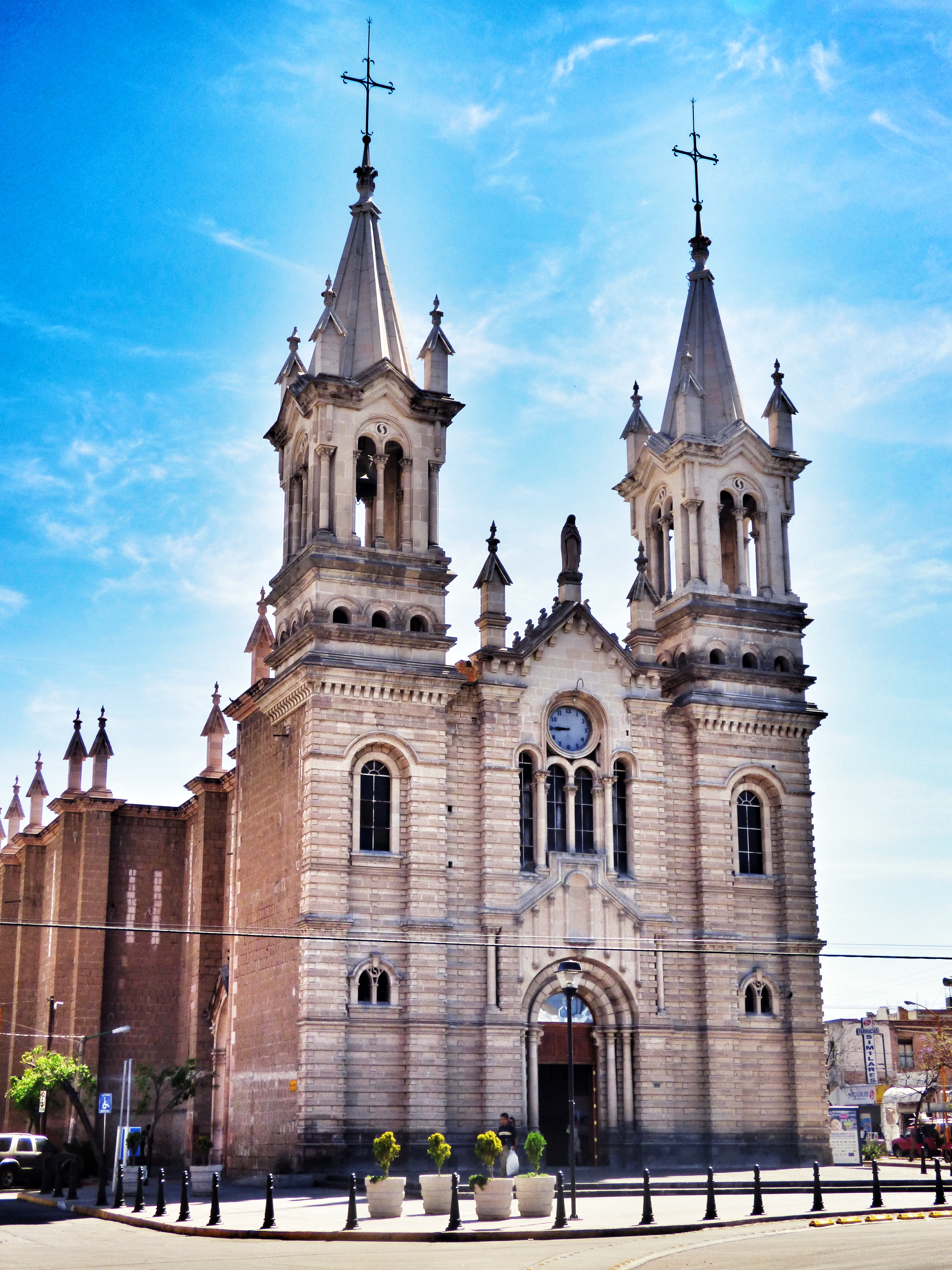
Façade of the Templo de la Purísima Concepción (1902), Aguascalientes, Ags.

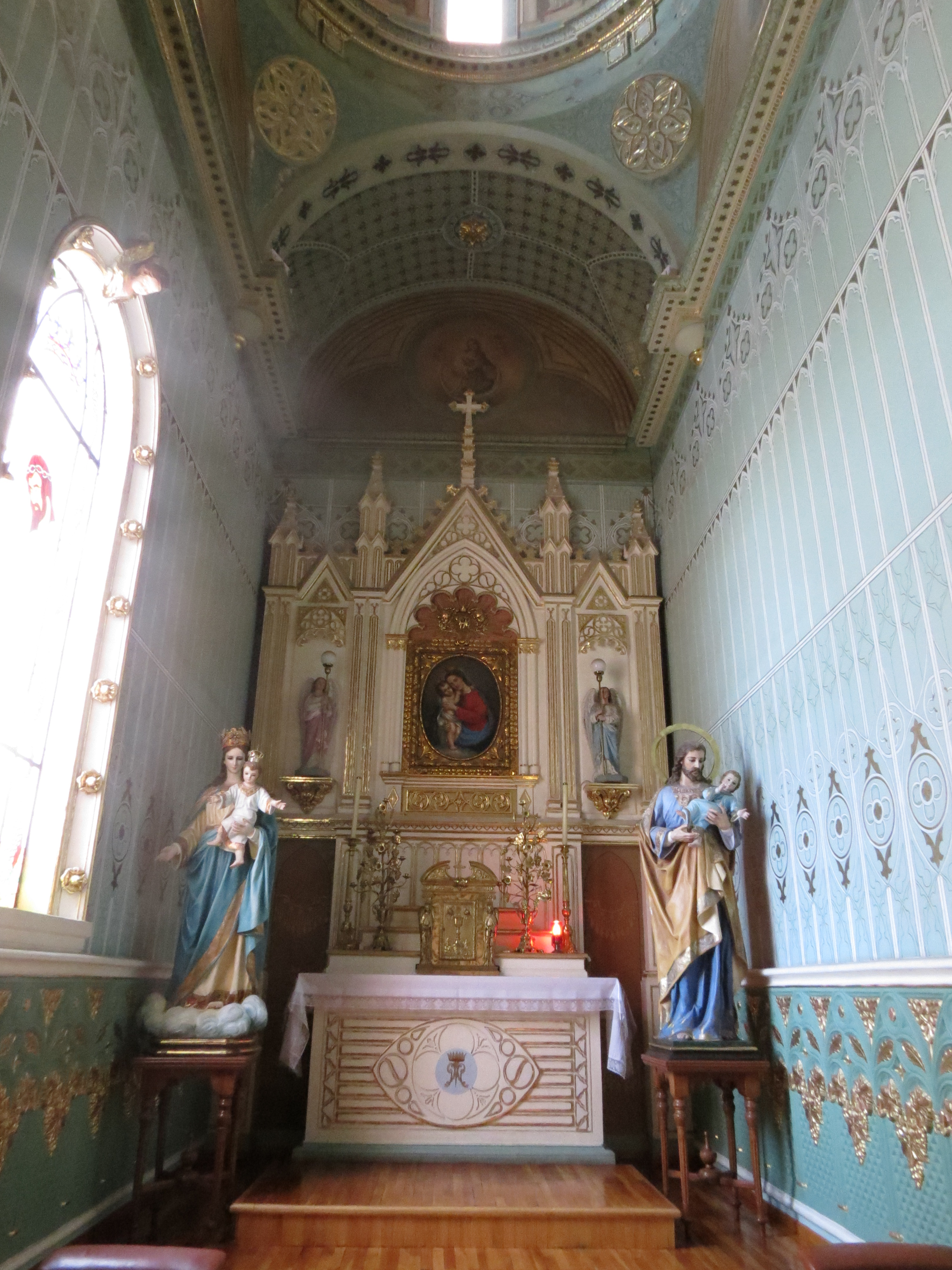
Altar of Nuestra Señora del Refugio (1906), inside the Templo del Señor del Encino, Aguascalientes, Ags.

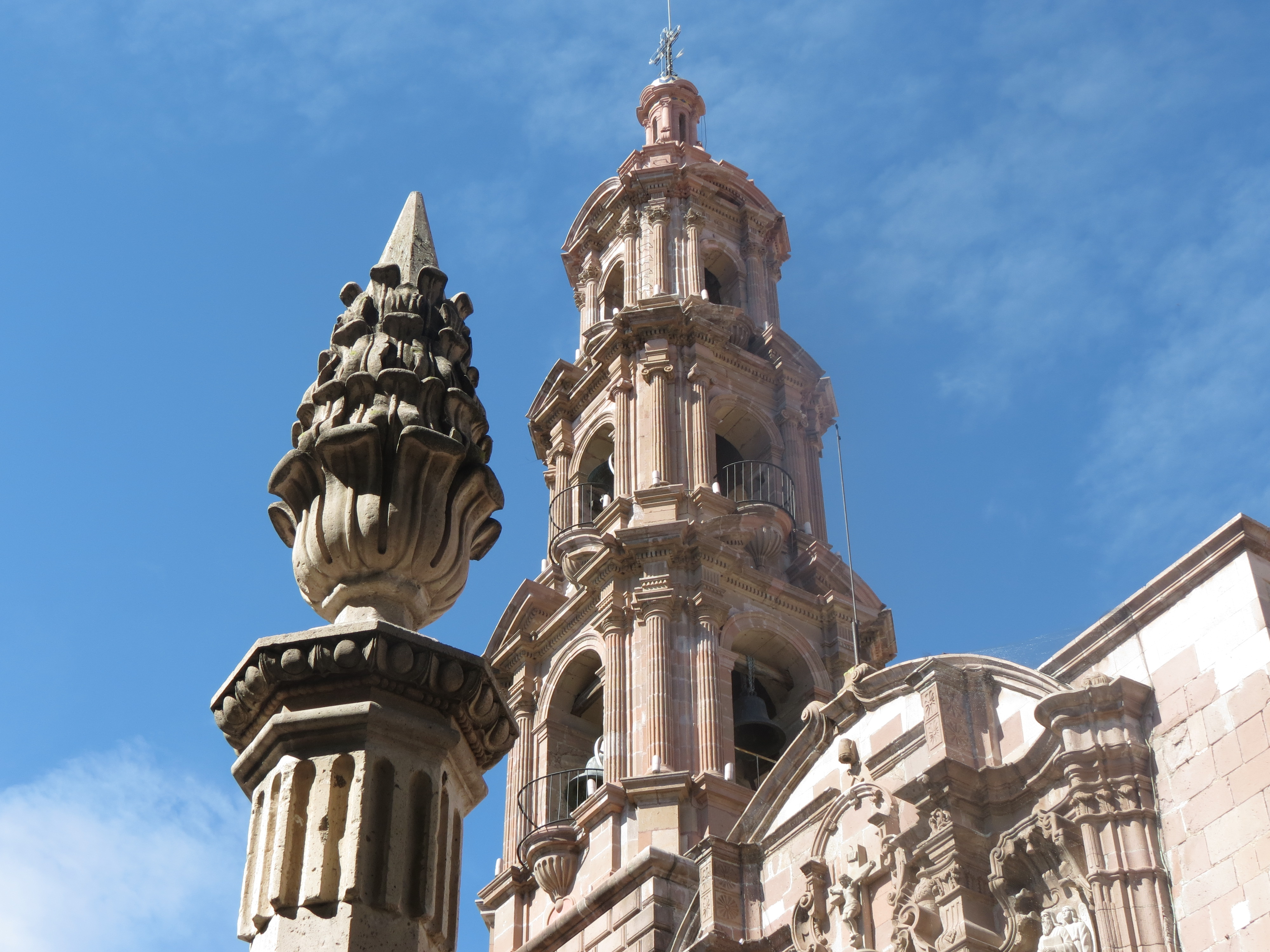
Detail of the ramp of the Templo del Señor del Encino (1906), Aguascalientes, Ags.

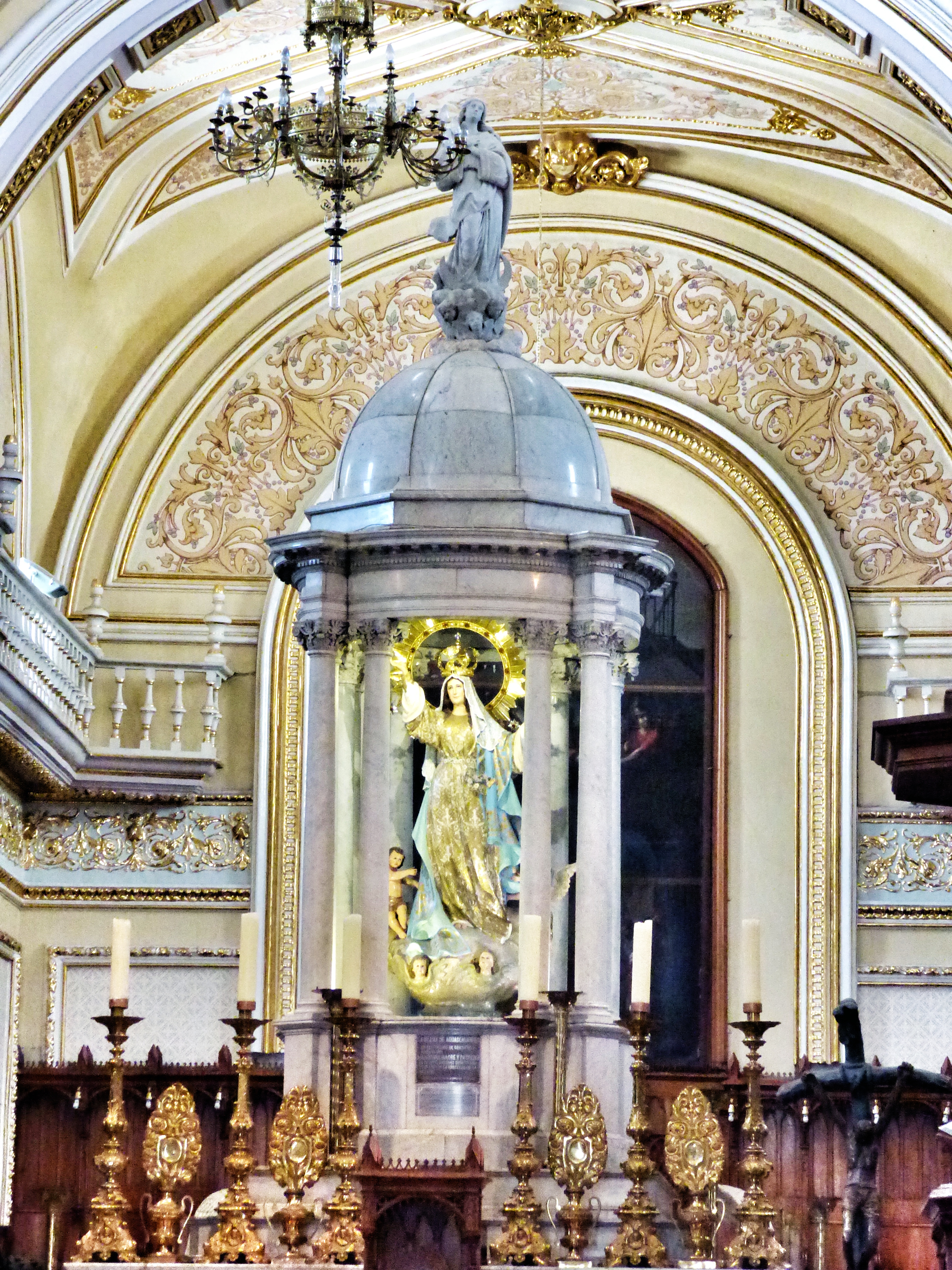
Cypress of the Cathedral of Aguascalientes (1907).

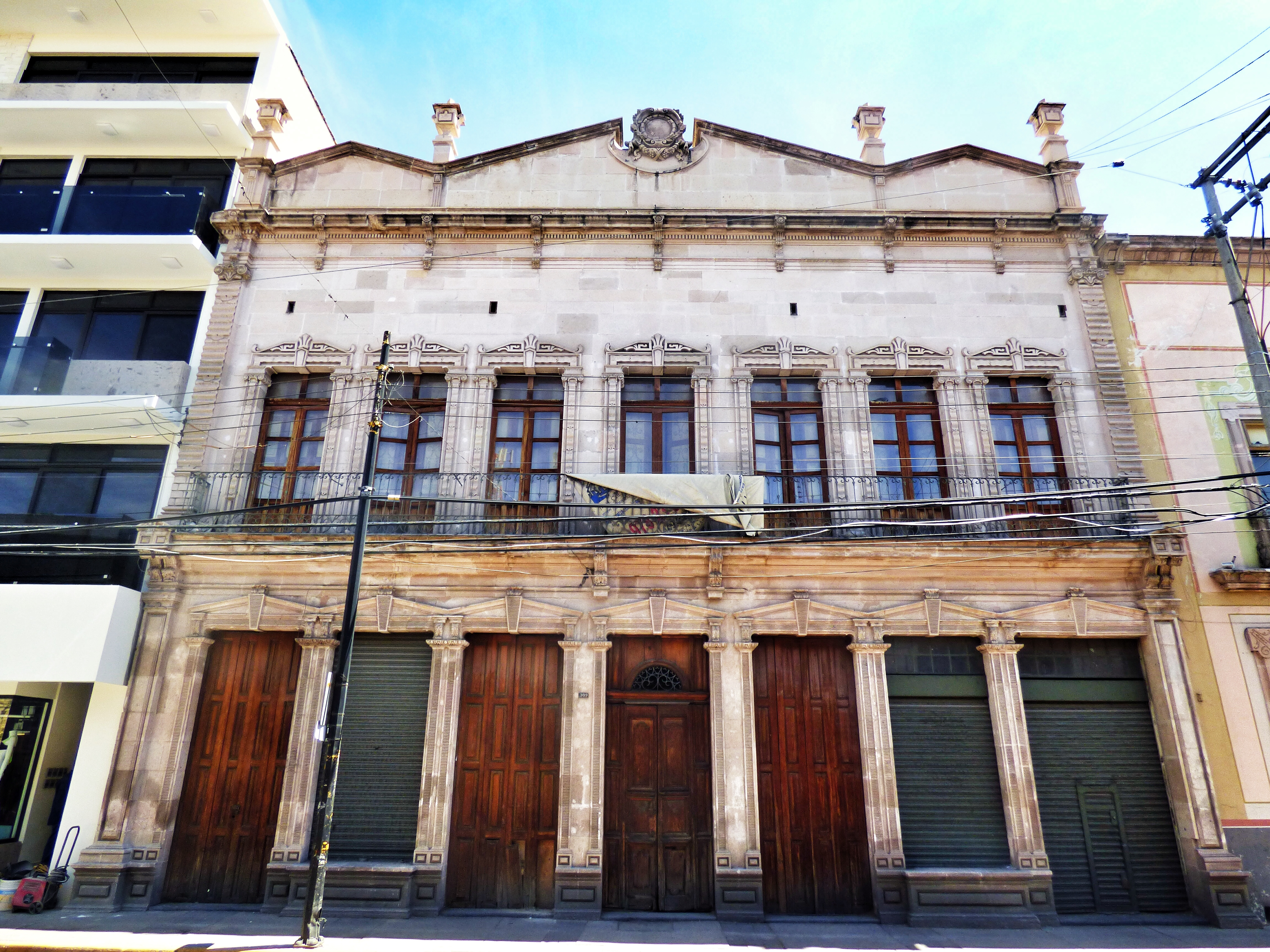
Casa Morelos Street, 309 (1908), Aguascalientes, Ags.

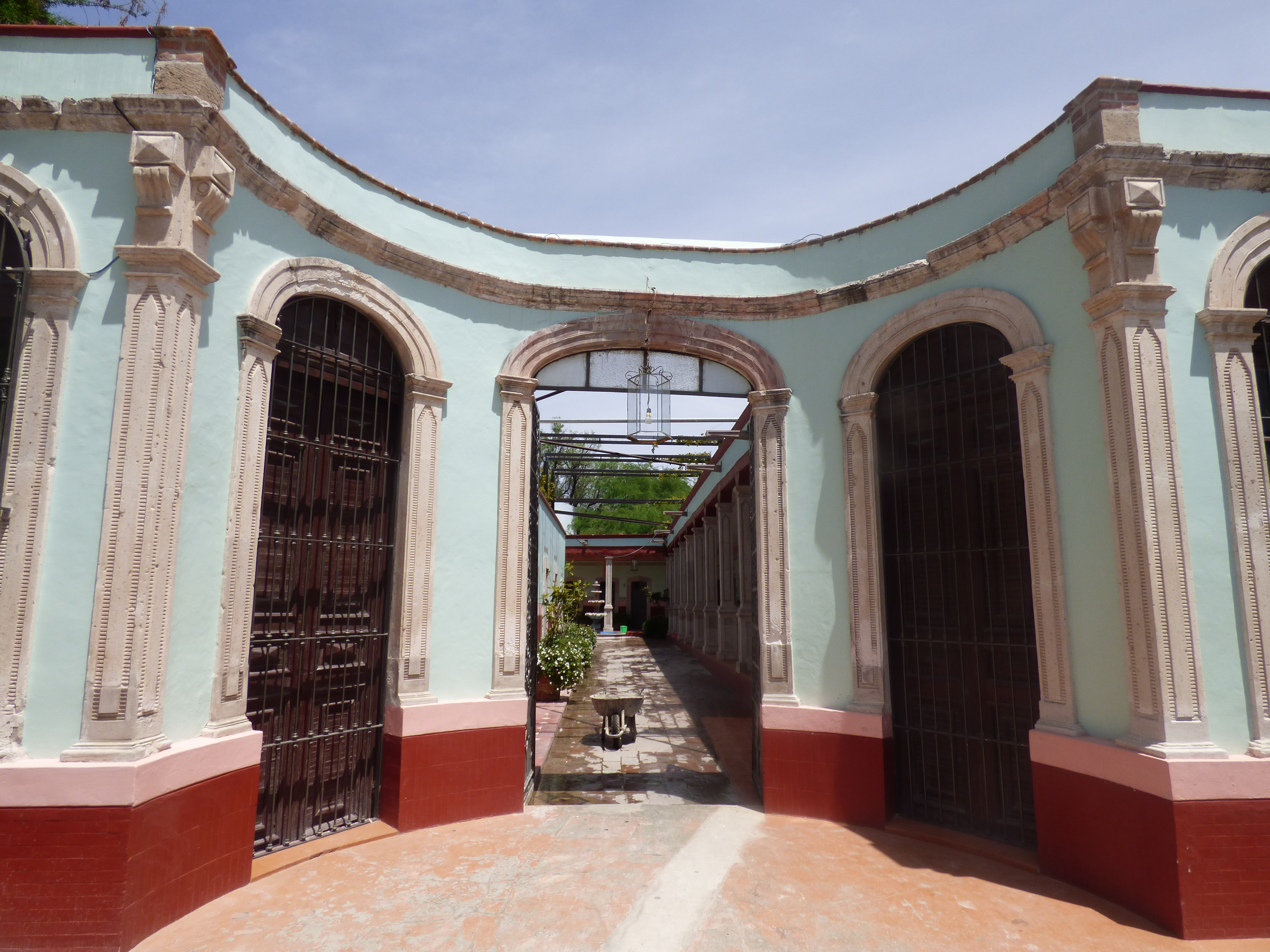
Facade of the Ojocaliente Baths (1908), Aguascalientes, Ags.

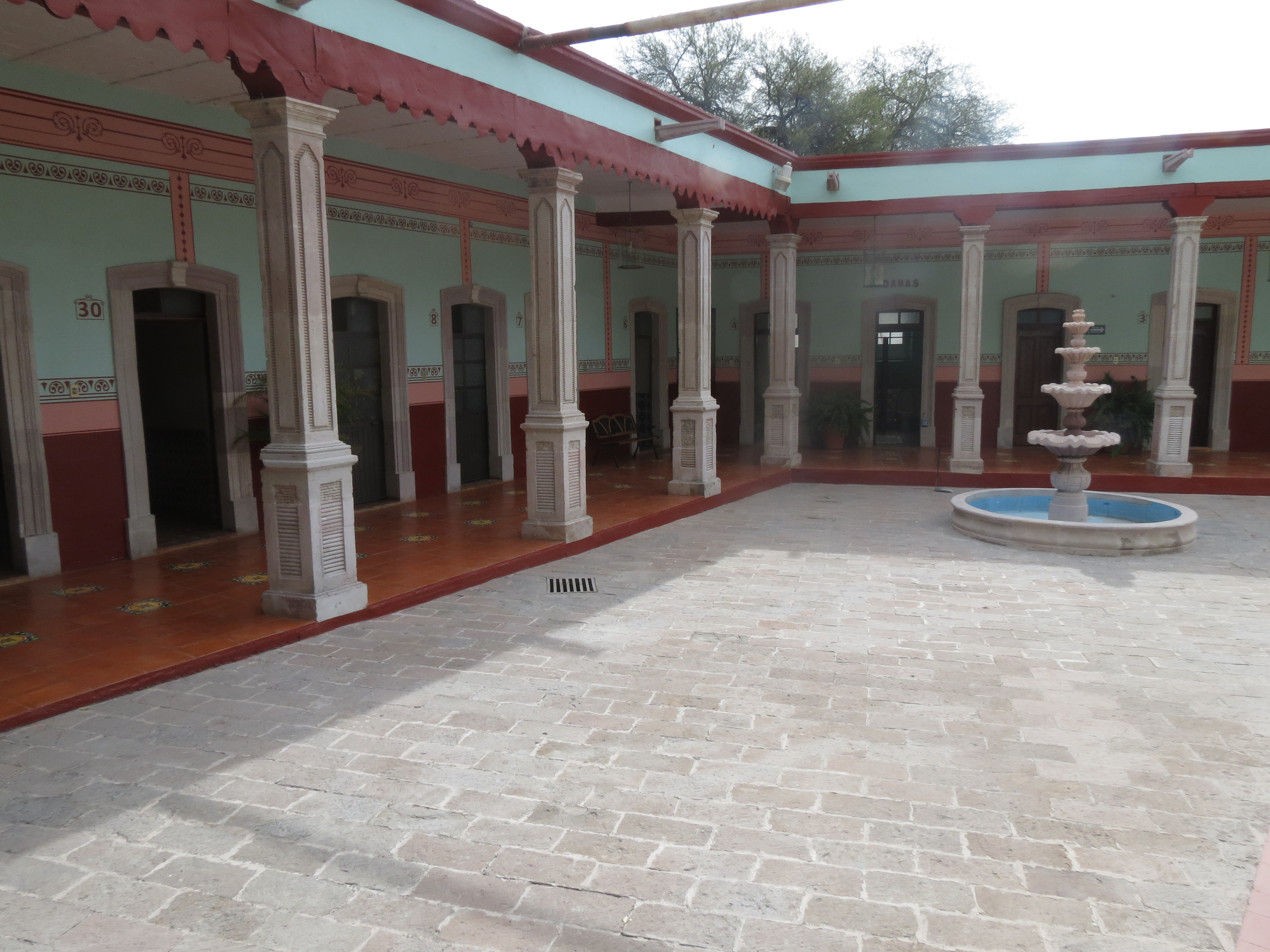
Inside of the Ojocaliente Baths (1908), Aguascalientes, Ags.

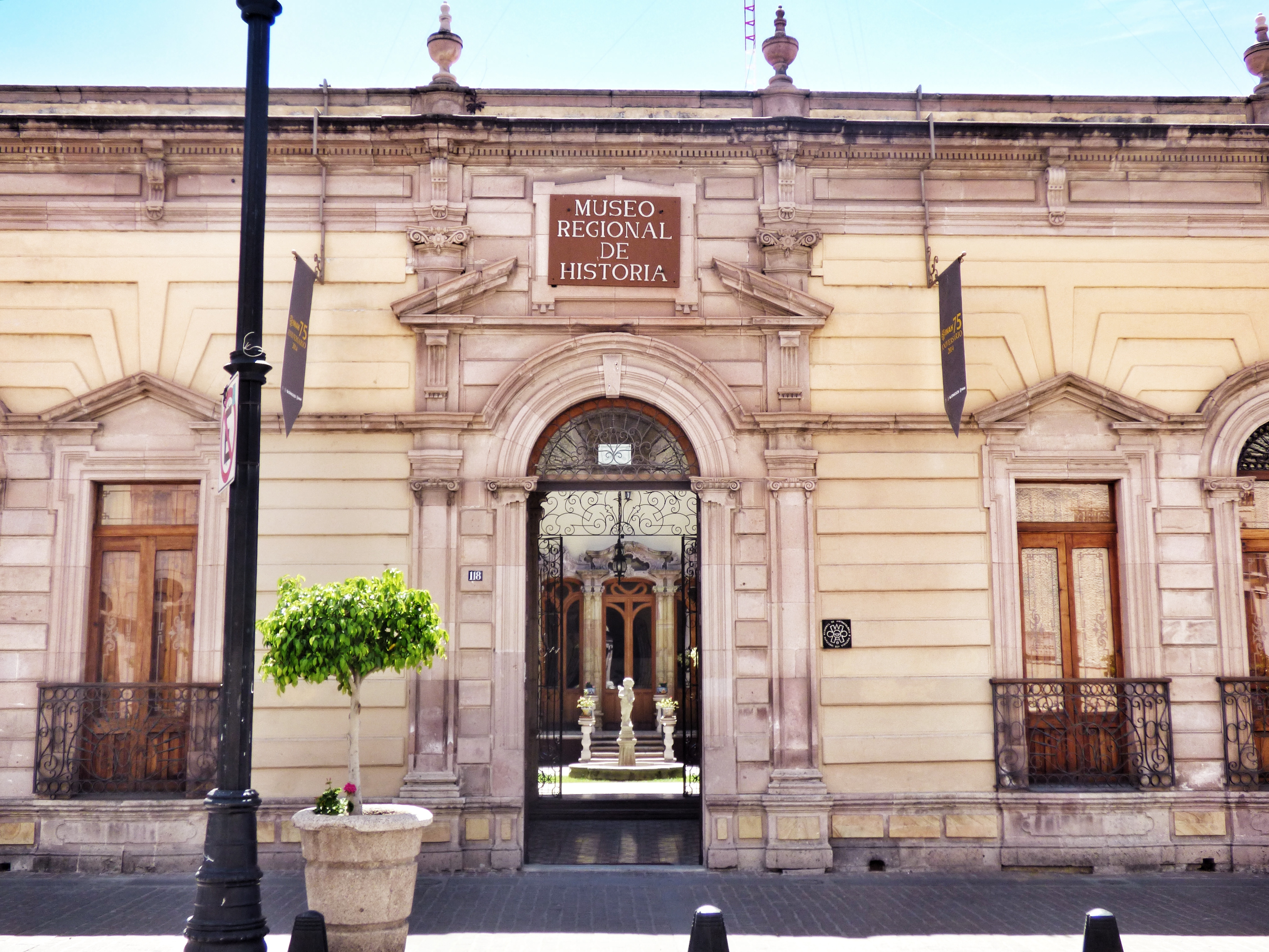
Museo Regional de Aguascalientes (1908).

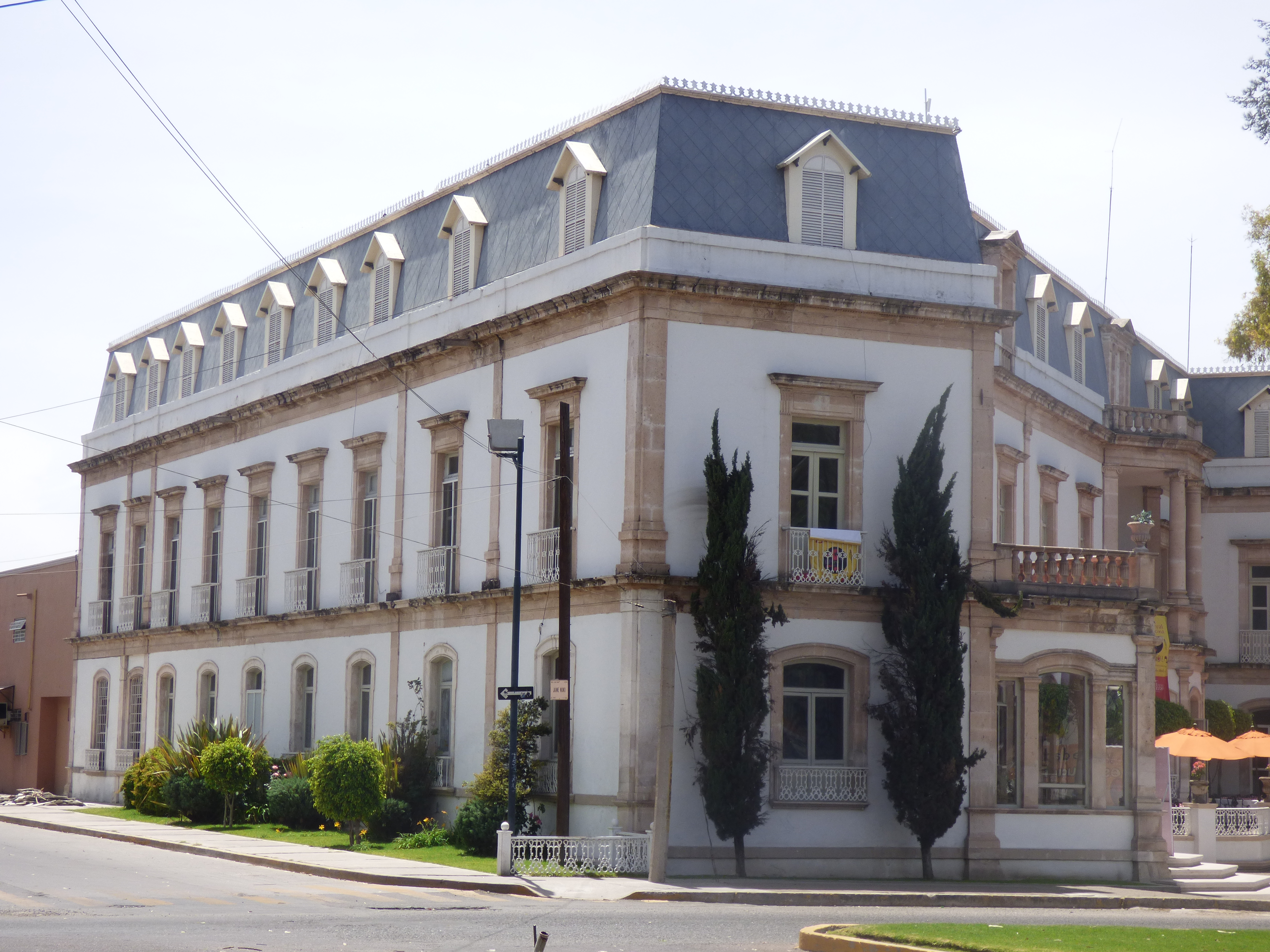
Escobedo Mansion (1908), now Hotel Alameda, Aguascalientes, Ags.

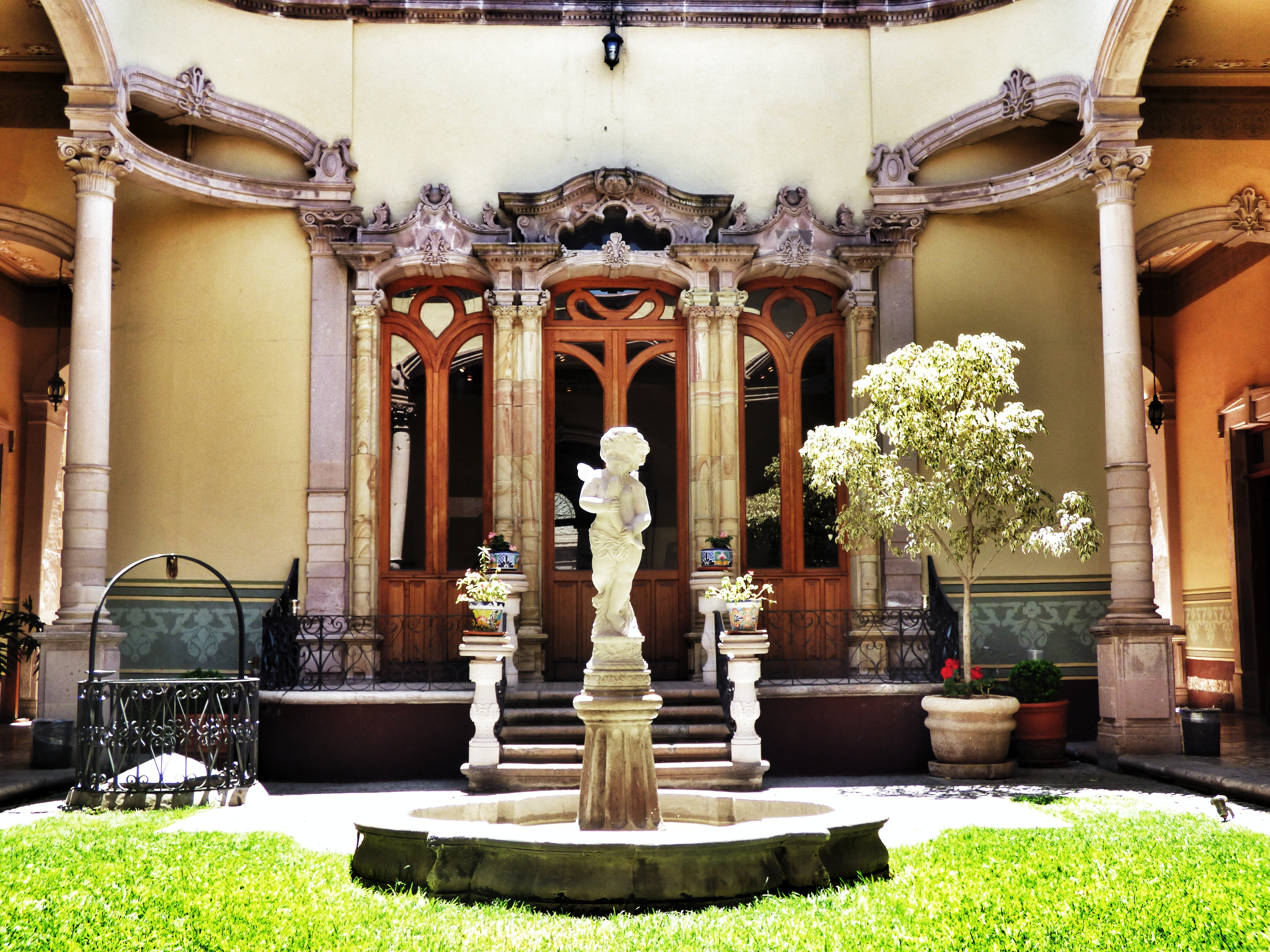
First patio of the Museo Regional de Aguascalientes (1908).

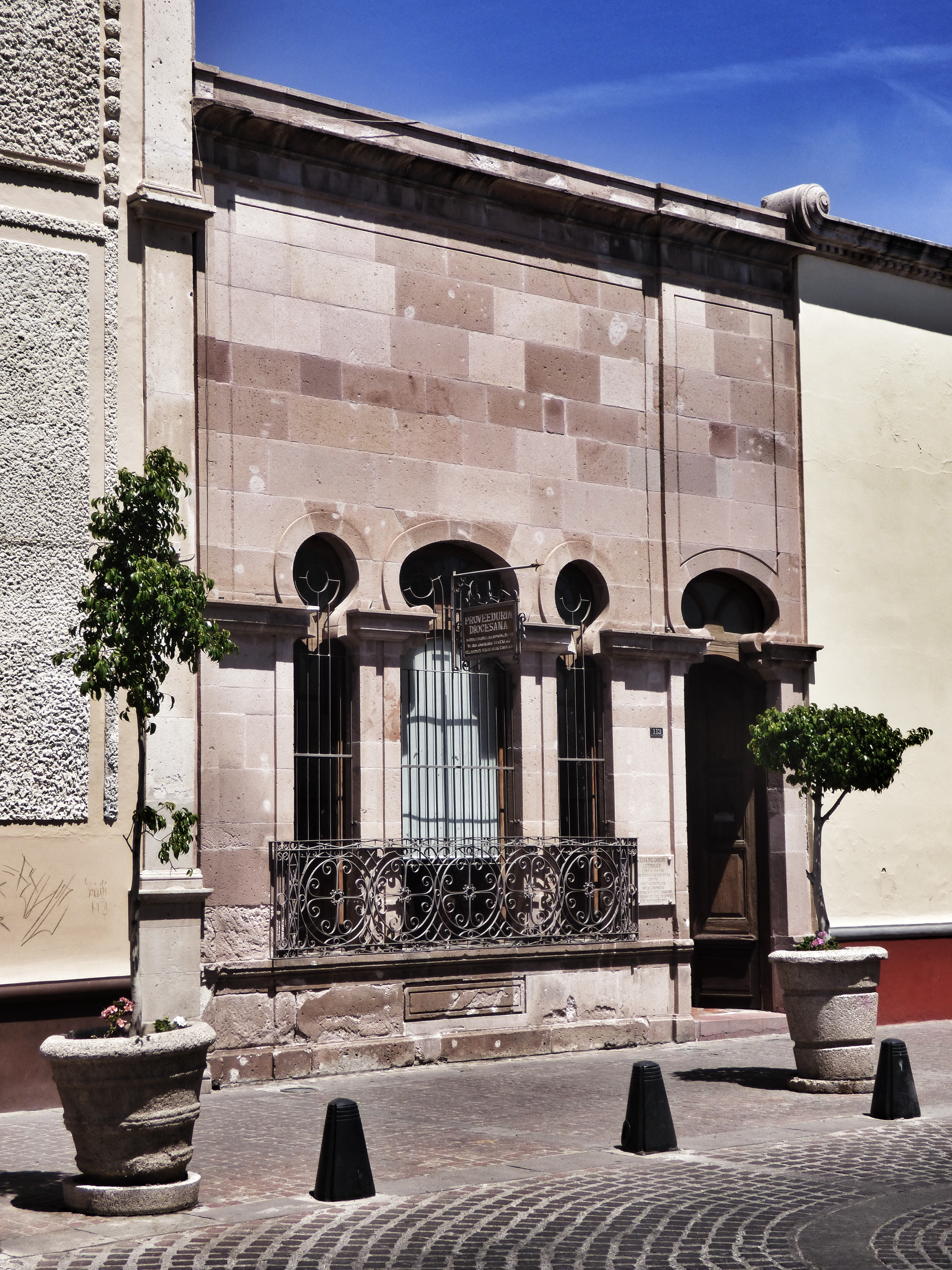
Cathedral Chapter (1913), Aguascalientes, Ags.

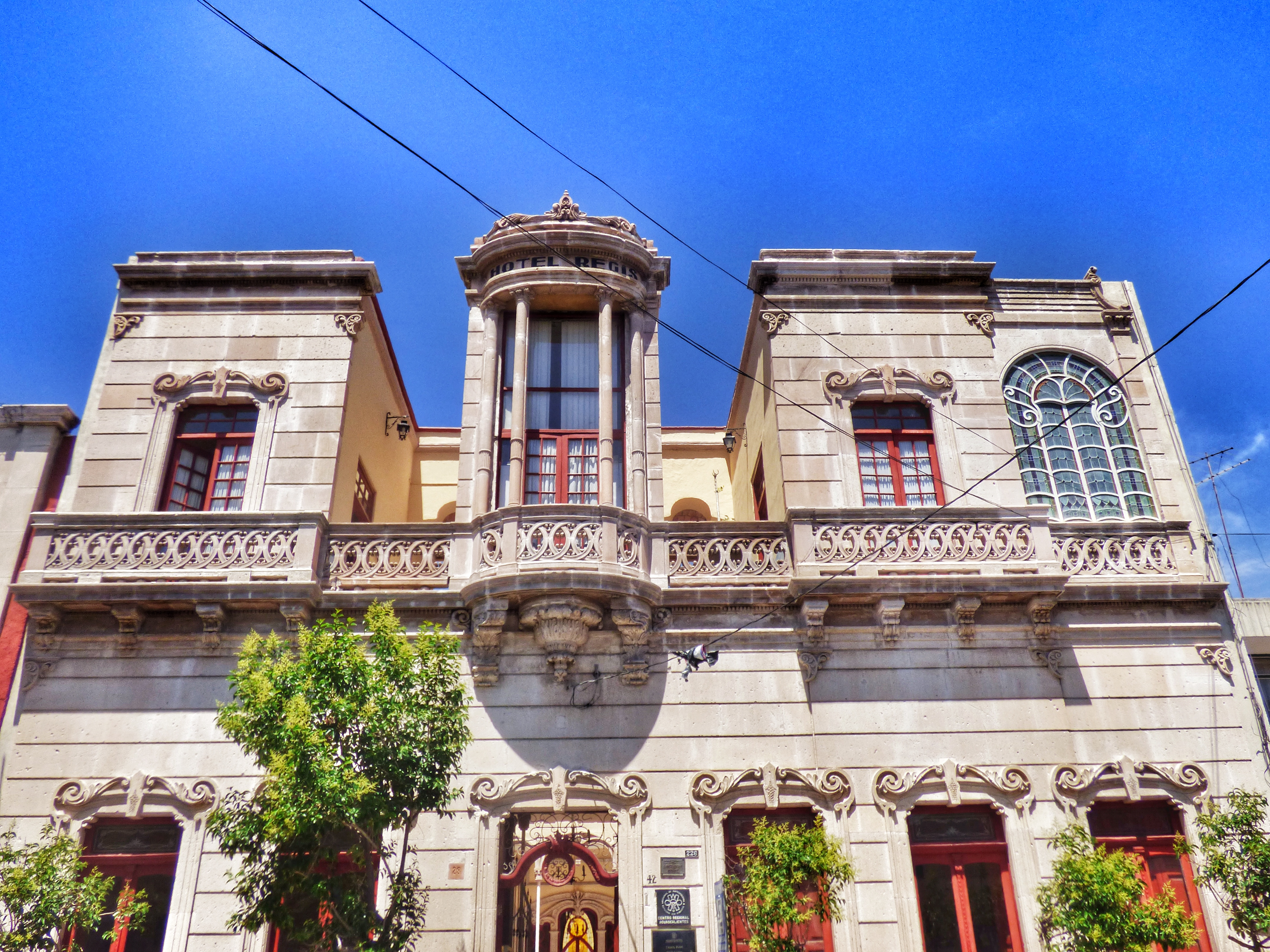
Hotel Regis (1914), Aguascalientes, Ags.

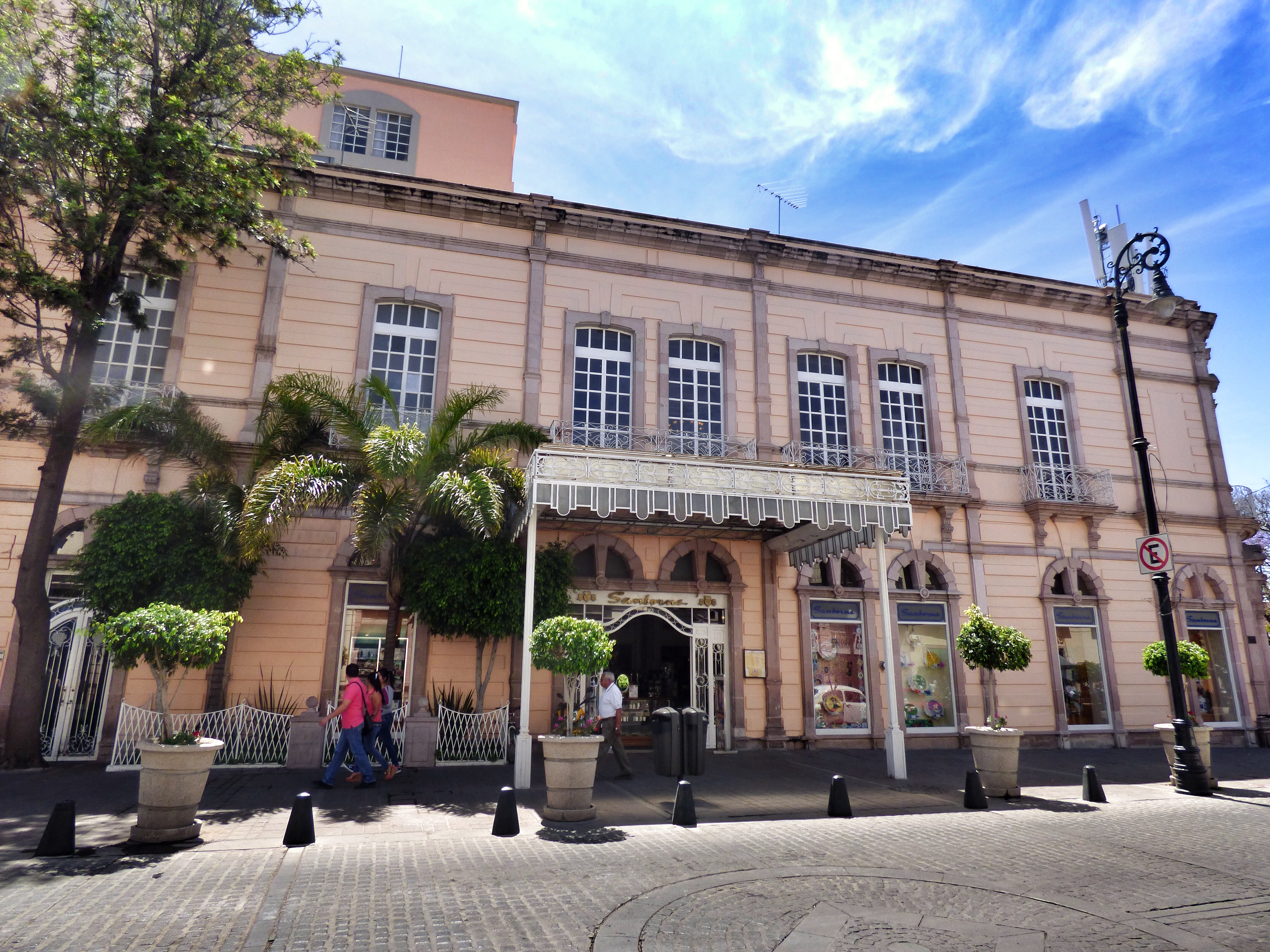
Hotel Francia (1915), Aguascalientes, Ags.

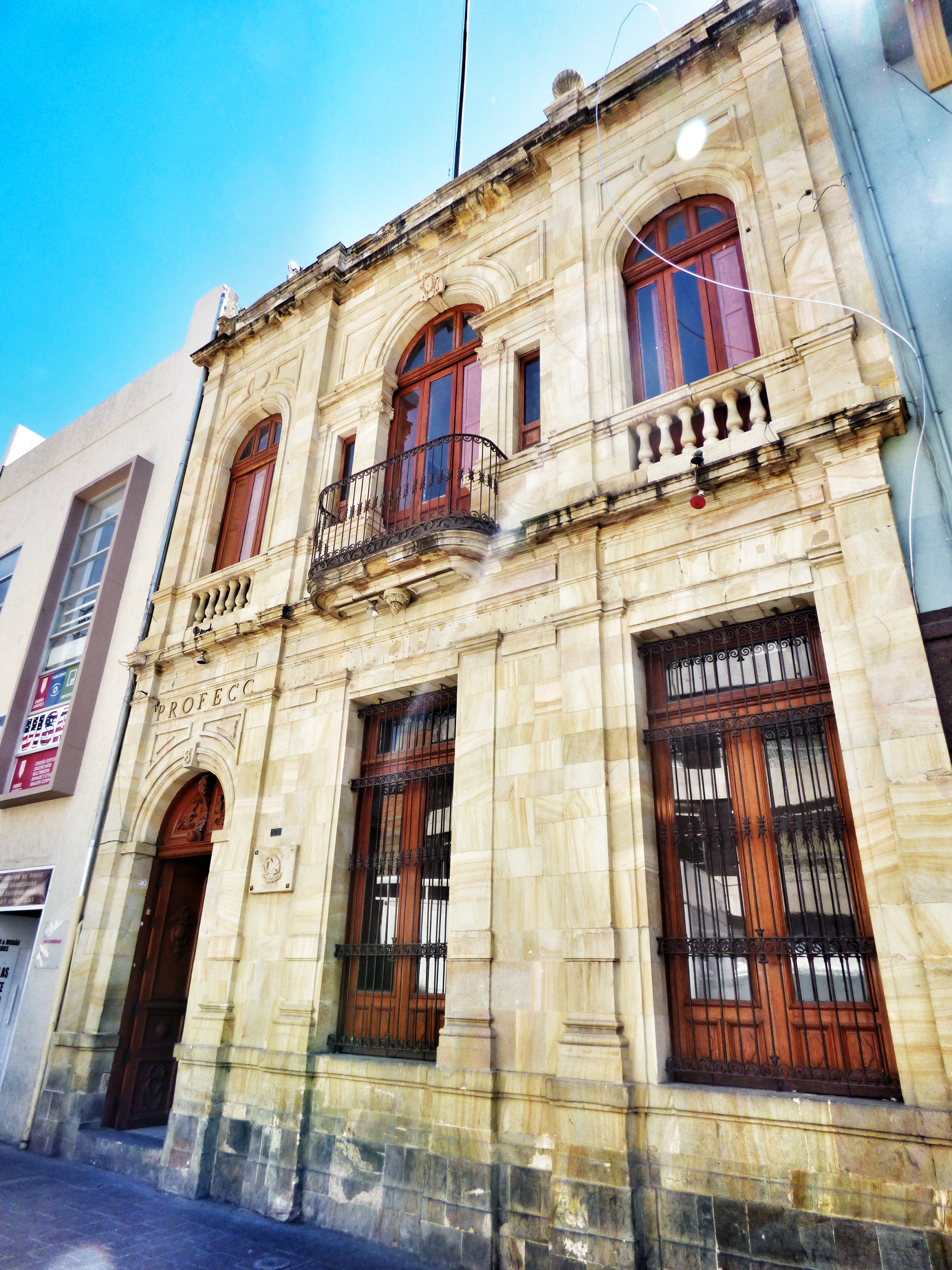
Casa de Ignacio Ortiz (1915), current headquarters of PROFECO, Aguascalientes, Ags.

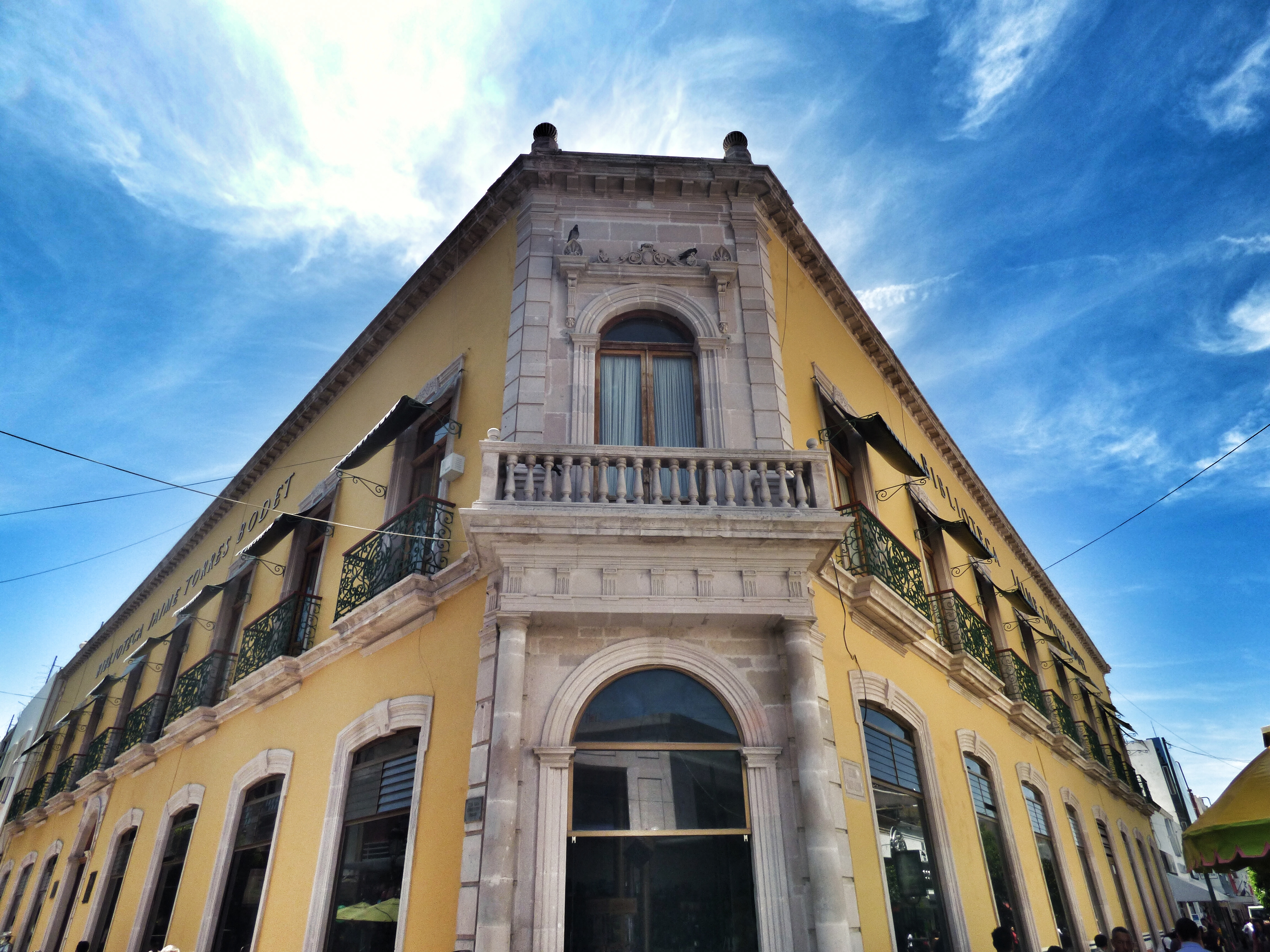
La Casa de la Gardenia (1916), now Jaime Torres Bodet Library, Aguascalientes, Ags.

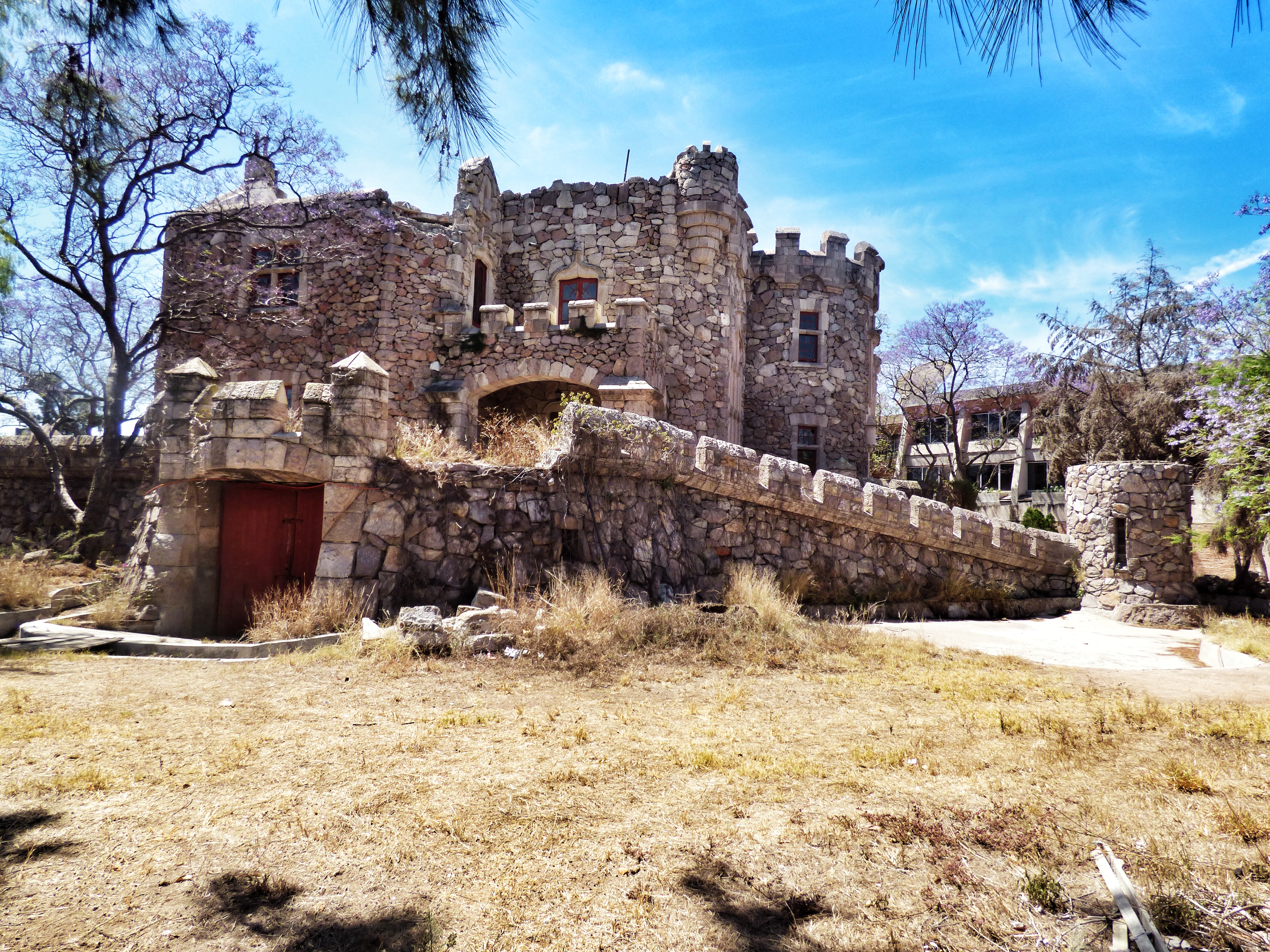
Castillo Douglas (1917), Aguascalientes, Ags.

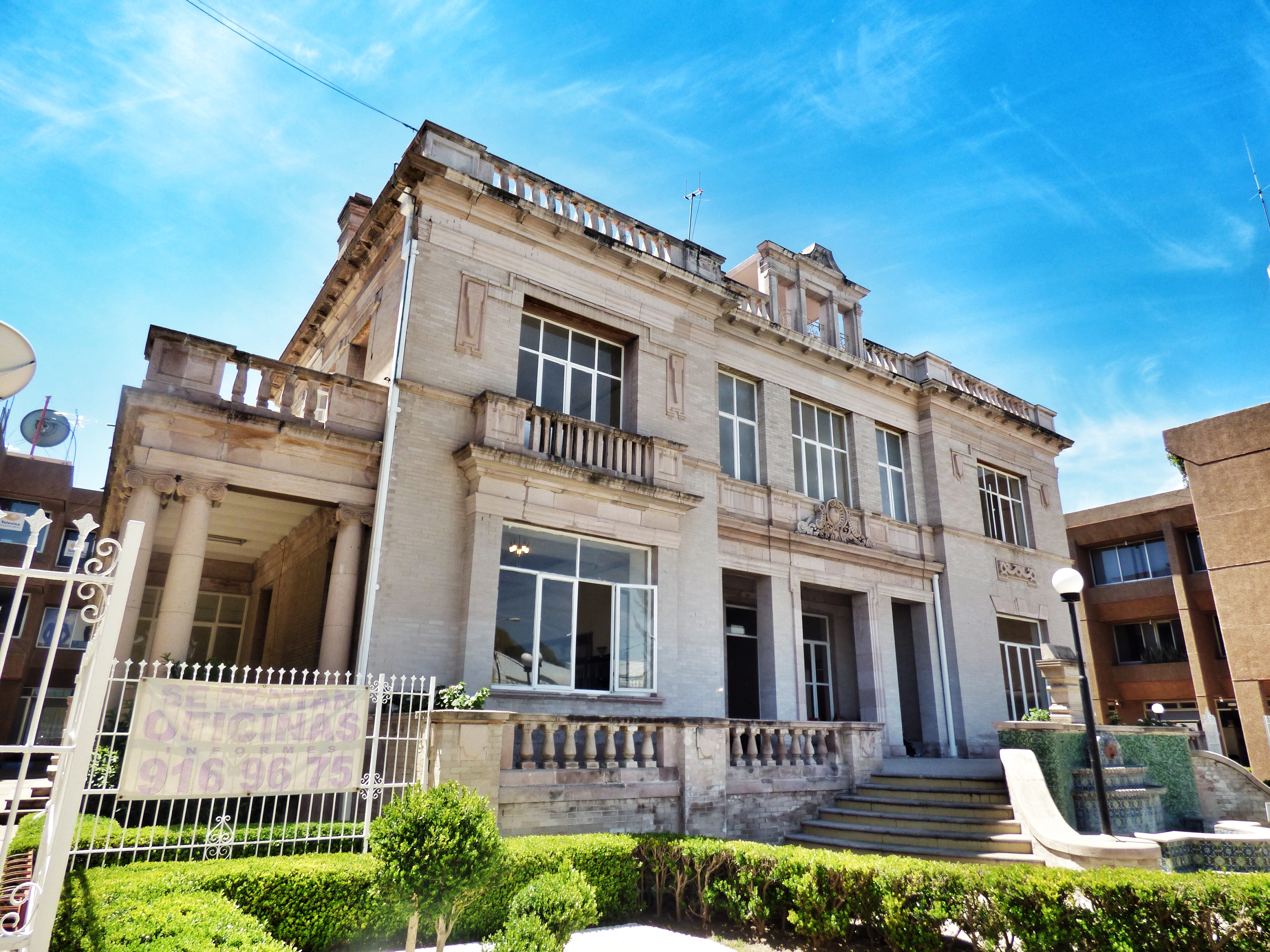
Chalet Douglas (1917), Aguascalientes, Ags.

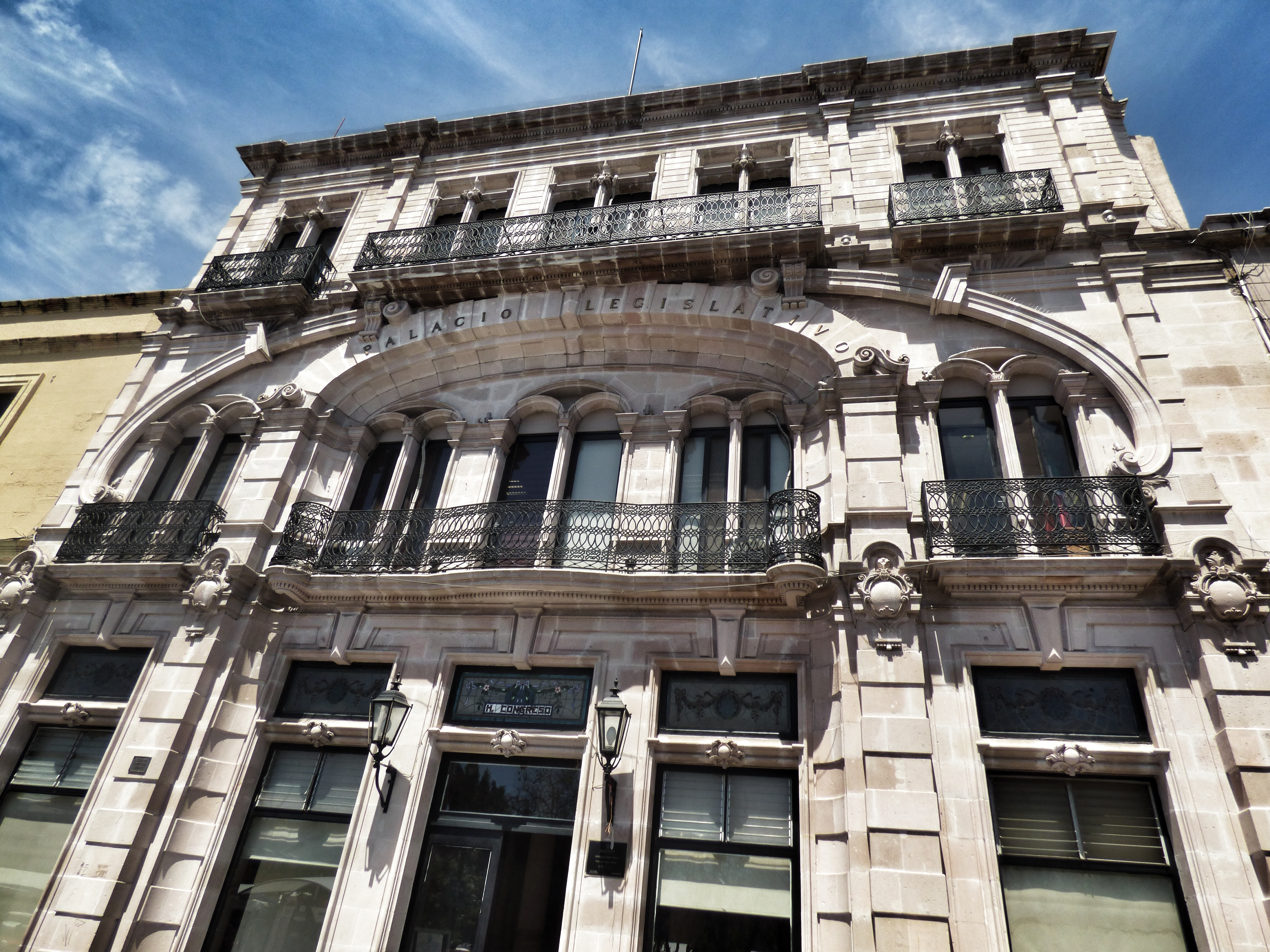
Hotel París (1919), present-day State Congress, Aguascalientes, Ags.

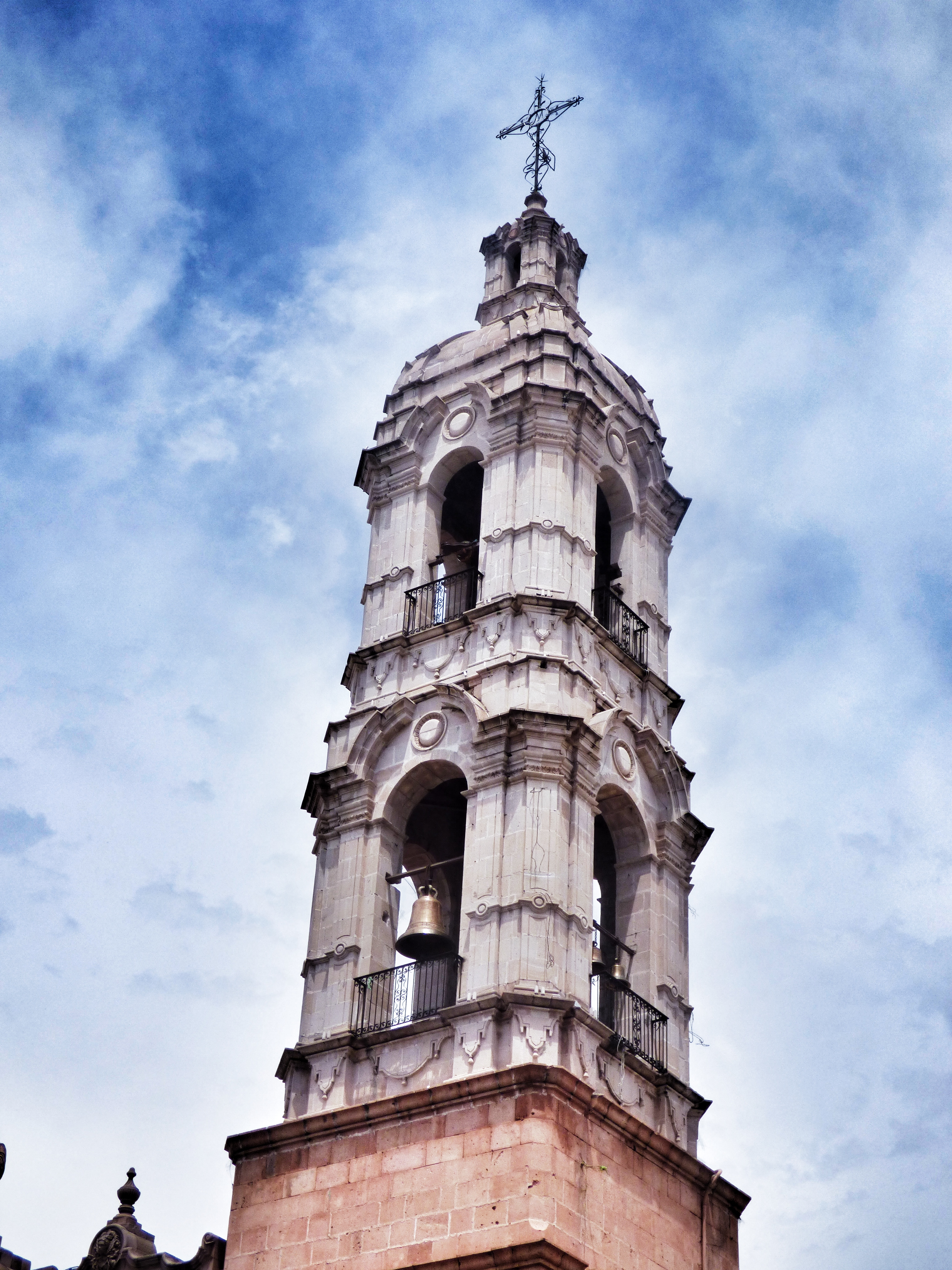
Tower of the Templo del Santuario de Nuestra Señora de Guadalupe, Aguascalientes, Ags. (completed by Victor Manuel Villegas in 1973).

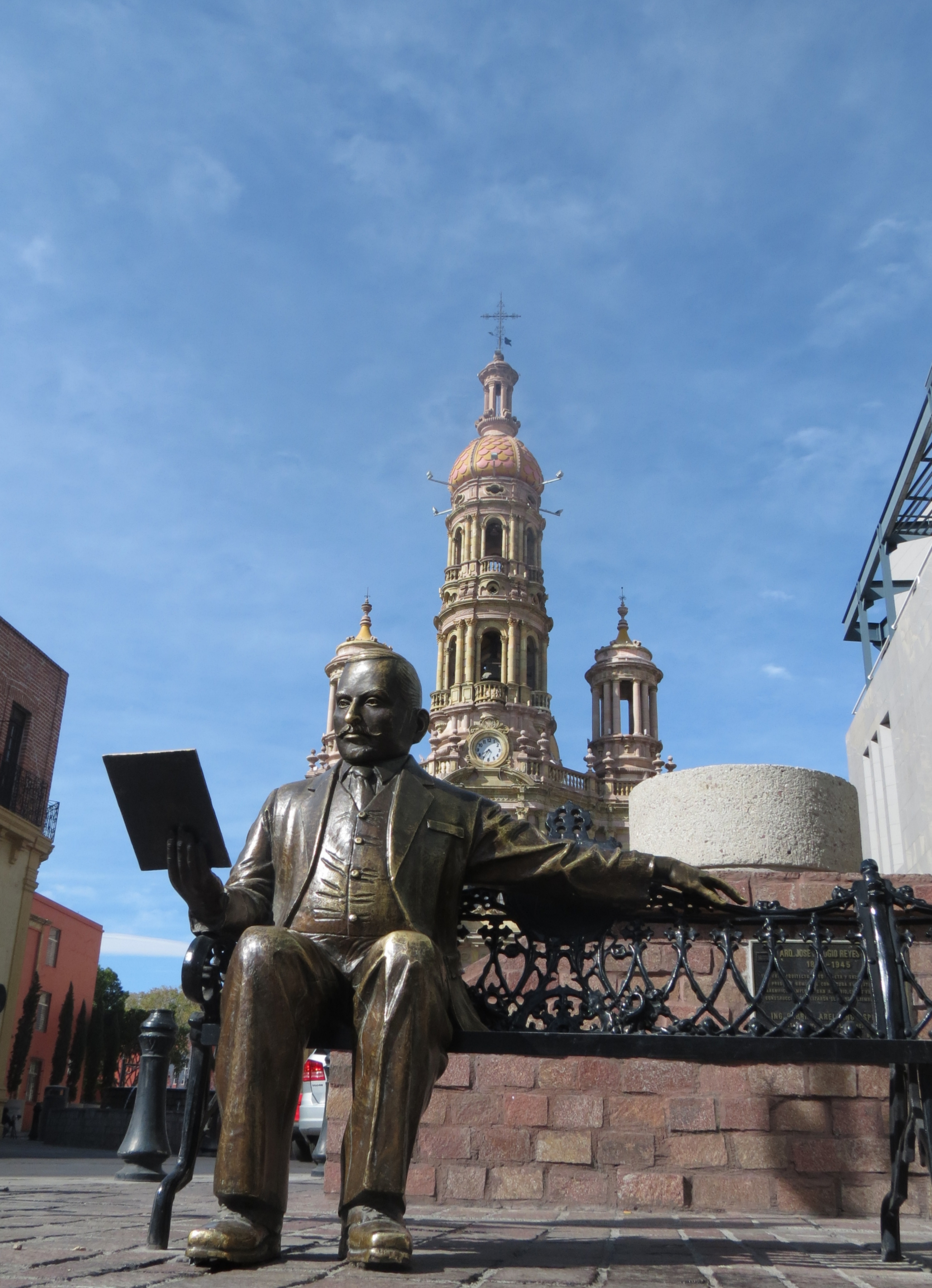
Monument to Refugio Reyes Rivas in front of the Templo de San Antonio, Aguascalientes, Ags.

== See also ==
- Museo de Aguascalientes
- Templo de San Antonio

== Bibliography ==
- Campos, Marcos Antonio (2002). Saturnino Herrán en Aguascalientes y la Ciudad de México (in Spanish). México: Filo de Agua. ISBN 968-5269-07-6.
- Cervantes Moreno, Juan Humberto (1998–2004). Crónica Urbana de Aguascalientes (in Spanish). México: Subsecretaría de Desarrollo Urbano de Aguascalientes (1998-2004).
- Esquer, Ricardo (1987). La Cultura Arquitectónica de Aguascalientes (in Spanish). México: Centro de Investigaciones Regionales de Aguascalientes.
- Gutiérrez, Ramón (1997). Urbanismo y Arquitectura en Iberoamérica (in Spanish). Madrid: Cátedra. ISBN 84-376-0442-7.
- León Portilla de Diener, Adriana (2001). Aguascalientes, un puente entre la tradición y la modernidad (in Spanish). México: Ediciones Nueva Guía. ISBN 978-968-6963-82-3.
- López García, Jesús (2005). Arquitectura de Aguascalientes: La primera mitad del siglo XX (PDF) (in Spanish). México: Universidad de Colima; Universidad Autónoma de Aguascalientes, Universidad de Guanajuato. Archived from the original (PDF) on 7 April 2014.
- López García, J. Jesús (2000). Perfiles arquitectónicos. Una mirada a la ciudad de Aguascalientes (in Spanish). México: Ayuntamiento de Aguascalientes. ISBN 970-18-5478-0.
- Medina Sánchez, Gabriela Monserrat (2015). Refugio Reyes (in Spanish). Aguascalientes: Instituto Cultural de Aguascalientes. ISBN 978-607-9444-23-5.
- Muñoz, Ángel Miguel, ed. (2009). Aguascalientes. Guía para descubrir los encantos del estado (in Spanish). México: Océano. ISBN 978-607-400-055-9.
- Ramírez López, Francisco Javier; Méndez Martínez, Leonor Elena; Padilla Núñez, Mónica Cristina; Torres Aguirre, Luis Ernesto; Díaz Blanco, David Alejandro (2013). En Aguascalientes Refugio Reyes se revalora (in Spanish) (1st ed.). Aguascalientes: Secretaría de Obras Públicas del Municipio de Aguascalientes.
- Ramírez López, Francisco Javier; Méndez Martínez, Leonor Elena; Franco, Fernando; Padilla Núñez, Mónica Cristina; Torres Aguirre, Luis Ernesto; Díaz Blanco, David Alejandro (2013). Camina y Revalora el corazón de México. Aguascalientes (in Spanish) (1st ed.). Aguascalientes: Secretaría de Obras Públicas del Municipio de Aguascalientes, Archivo General Municipal Aguascalientes, Universidad Autónoma de Aguascalientes.
- Reyes Rodríguez, Andrés (2012). Adiós, arquitecto sin título. Breves relatos sobre Refugio Reyes (in Spanish). México: H. Ayuntamiento de Aguascalientes, Instituto Municipal Aguascalentense para la Cultura. ISBN 9786079594404.
- Reyes Rodríguez, Andrés (2013). Refugio Reyes, una vida. El aprendizaje (in Spanish). México: H. Ayuntamiento de Aguascalientes, Instituto Municipal Aguascalentense para la Cultura. ISBN 978-607-96216-3-6.
- Villanueva Clavel, Jorge Guadalupe; Gómez Serrano, Jesús; Reyes Rodríguez, Andrés; Martínez Delgado, Gerardo; Sifuentes Solís, Marco Alejandro; García Ruvalcaba, José Luis (2013). Refugio Reyes Rivas, Arquitecto Empírico (in Spanish). Aguascalientes, México: Instituto Cultural de Aguascalientes. ISBN 978-607-7585-71-8.
- Villegas, Víctor Manuel (1974). Arquitectura de Refugio Reyes (in Spanish). México: Imprenta Madero.
