= Felipe González González =

Mexican politician and businessman (1947–2023)

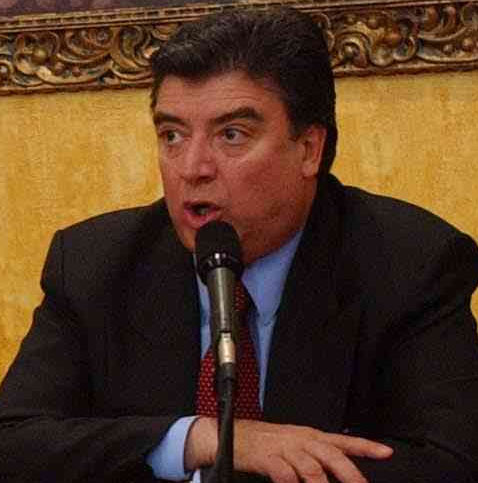

Governor of Aguascalientes
- In office 1 December 1998 – 25 August 2004
- Preceded by: Otto Granados Roldán
- Succeeded by: Juan José León Rubio

Senator for Aguascalientes
- In office 1 September 2006 – 31 August 2012
- Preceded by: Alfredo Reyes Velázquez
- Succeeded by: Martín Orozco Sandoval

Personal details
- Born: 28 January 1947 Aguascalientes, Mexico
- Died: 24 February 2023 (aged 76) Aguascalientes, Mexico
- Party: PAN
- Parents: Jesús González García (father); Elena González Macías (mother)

Felipe González González (28 January 1947 – 24 February 2023) was a Mexican politician and businessman. A member of the National Action Party (PAN), he was Governor of Aguascalientes from 1998 to 2004 and served in the Senate from 2006 to 2012.

== Early years ==
Felipe González was born in Aguascalientes, Aguascalientes, on January 28, 1947. His father died when he was 21, after which time he worked in the family business with his brothers.

== Career ==
=== Business ===
González served most of his professional life as an entrepreneur in various sectors. In 1991, he was president of the Business Center of Aguascalientes (CEA). He also served as president of the Employers' Confederation of Mexico (Coparmex) in Aguascalientes, and as chairman of the board of BBVA Bancomer and director of seven other banks. He served as president of the Sister City Committee, and was the founder and president of the Social Union of Businessmen in Mexico (USEM) in Aguascalientes. As president of the Association of Grocery Store Owners, González maintained a close relationship with the grocers of Aguascalientes.

Among his many awards was the Business Award of Merit in 1993, awarded by the Confederation of Chambers of Commerce nationwide.

=== Education ===
González served as chairman of the board of the Autonomous University of Aguascalientes and of the National College of Professional Technical Education (CONALEP); he supported and promoted the creation of the Panamerican University's Bonaterra Campus in Aguascalientes.

=== Politics ===
His first foray into politics was his nomination as the PAN's candidate for governor in Aguascalientes in 1998. After an intense campaign and an unprecedented mobilization of many population sectors in Aguascalientes, he secured a surprise victory over Institutional Revolutionary Party (PRI) candidate Héctor Hugo Olivares Ventura with 53% of the vote (against Olivares Ventura's 36%), making him the state's first governor not to come from the ranks of the PRI. During his term as governor, he focused on the politics of industrialization and sought to attract international investment into the state.

On August 25, 2004, he was appointed by President Vicente Fox as an assistant secretary at the Interior Ministry, a position where he remained until January 9, 2006. That year, he resigned to be nominated as a candidate for the Senate, representing the state of Aguascalientes, a position he was elected to until 2012 for the 60th and 61st legislatures. While in the Senate, he served as chairman of the Public Security Committee.

== Personal life and death ==
González was married to Cony Ramírez Zermeño, with whom he had four children. He was a Grand Knight of the Knights of Columbus. He was vice president of the board of Corazón Amigo, an organization that provides medical treatment to poor people.

González died in the city of Aguascalientes on February 24, 2023, at the age of 76.

Political offices
Preceded by Otto Granados Roldán	Governor of Aguascalientes; 1998–2004	Succeeded by Juan José León Rubio
Senate of the Republic (Mexico)
Preceded by Alfredo Reyes Velázquez	Senator to the Congress of the Union for Aguascalientes; 2006–2012; Served alongside: Rubén Camarillo Ortega, Carlos Lozano de la Torre, Norma Esparza Herrera	Succeeded by Martín Orozco Sandoval
