= 2022 Mexican local elections =

- 5 June 2022

6 governorships 1 state congress 39 municipalities
- PAN hold PRI gain Morena gain No election Morena-led hold No election

The 2022 Mexican local elections, held on June 5, 2022, saw voters electing six governors for a six-year term (five years in Aguascalientes and Quintana Roo), deputies for one state congress, and officials for 39 municipalities.

The two main coalitions, Juntos Hacemos Historia (MORENA PT PVEM) and Va por México (PAN PRI PRD), competed in the gubernatorial races. Morena, as part of its coalition, continued its pattern of flipping governorships, flipping four in total, while Va por México successfully defended only two.

== Gubernatorial races summary ==
State	Incumbent		Candidates
State	Governor	Party	Candidates
Aguascalientes	Martín Orozco Sandoval		▌ ✓ María Teresa Jiménez Esquivel (PAN); ▌ Nora Ruvalcaba Gámez (MORENA)
Durango	José Rosas Aispuro		▌ ✓ Esteban Villegas Villarreal (PRI); ▌ Alma Marina Vitela (MORENA)
Hidalgo	Omar Fayad	Institutional Revolutionary Party	▌ ✓ Julio Menchaca (MORENA); ▌ Carolina Viggiano (PRI)
Oaxaca	Alejandro Murat Hinojosa	Institutional Revolutionary Party	▌ ✓ Salomón Jara Cruz (MORENA); ▌ Alejandro Avilés Álvarez (PRI)
Quintana Roo	Carlos Joaquín González	Party of the Democratic Revolution	▌ ✓ Mara Lezama Espinosa (MORENA); ▌ Laura Fernández Piña (PRD); ▌ José Luis Pech Várguez (MC)
Tamaulipas	Francisco Javier García Cabeza de Vaca		▌ ✓ Américo Villarreal Anaya (MORENA); ▌ César Augusto Verástegui Ostos (PAN)

== State races ==
=== Aguascalientes ===
The governorship of Aguascalientes was up for election.

2022 Aguascalientes gubernatorial election
Candidate	Party	Votes	%
María Teresa Jiménez Esquivel	National Action Party	249,464	55.28
Nora Ruvalcaba Gámez	Morena	155,531	34.46
Anayeli Muñoz Moreno	Citizens' Movement	32,270	7.15
Martha Márquez Alvarado	Labor Party	7,280	1.61
Natzielly Teresita Rodríguez Calzada	Force for Mexico	6,446	1.43
Non-registered candidates		283	0.06
Total		451,274	100.00
Valid votes		451,274	97.27
Invalid/blank votes		12,680	2.73
Total votes		463,954	100.00
Registered voters/turnout		1,008,750	45.99

=== Durango ===
The governorship of Durango was up for election, as well as all positions in the state's 39 municipalities.

2022 Durango gubernatorial election
Candidate	Party	Votes	%
Esteban Villegas Villarreal	Institutional Revolutionary Party	332,311	55.09
Alma Marina Vitela	Morena	240,255	39.83
Patricia Flores Elizondo	Citizens' Movement	27,741	4.60
Non-registered candidates		2,861	0.47
Total		603,168	100.00
Valid votes		603,168	97.56
Invalid/blank votes		15,109	2.44
Total votes		618,277	100.00
Registered voters/turnout		1,225,242	50.46

=== Hidalgo ===
The governorship of Hidalgo was up for election.

2022 Hidalgo gubernatorial election
Candidate	Party	Votes	%
Julio Menchaca	Morena	653,181	63.34
Carolina Viggiano	Institutional Revolutionary Party	332,484	32.24
Francisco Xavier Berganza	Citizens' Movement	32,709	3.17
José Luis Lima Morales	Ecologist Green Party	12,125	1.18
Non-registered candidates		710	0.07
Total		1,031,209	100.00
Valid votes		1,031,209	97.19
Invalid/blank votes		29,781	2.81
Total votes		1,060,990	100.00
Registered voters/turnout		2,229,536	47.59

=== Oaxaca ===
The governorship of Oaxaca was up for election.

2022 Oaxaca gubernatorial election
Candidate	Party	Votes	%
Salomón Jara Cruz	Morena	680,752	62.36
Alejandro Avilés Álvarez	Institutional Revolutionary Party	282,479	25.88
Antonia Nativiad Díaz Jiménez	National Action Party	42,616	3.90
Dulce Alejandra García Morlan	Citizens' Movement	36,979	3.39
Mauricio Cruz Vargas	Independent	20,734	1.90
Bersahin Asael López López	New Alliance Party	18,262	1.67
Jesús López Rodríguez	Independent	8,647	0.79
Non-registered candidates		1,121	0.10
Total		1,091,590	100.00
Valid votes		1,091,590	96.64
Invalid/blank votes		37,921	3.36
Total votes		1,129,511	100.00
Registered voters/turnout		2,911,547	38.79

=== Quintana Roo ===
All 25 seats of the Congress of Quintana Roo were up for election, where 15 were elected through first-past-the-post voting and 10 through proportional representation. Additionally, the governorship was up for election.

2022 Congress of Quintana Roo election
Party	Before	After	Change
Morena	9	10	▲1
Party of the Democratic Revolution	4	1	▼3
Ecologist Green Party of Mexico	3	7	▲4
Party of the Democratic Revolution	2	0	▼2
Labor Party	2	3	▲1
Institutional Revolutionary Party	1	1	Steady
Citizens' Movement	1	1	Steady
Movimiento Auténtico Social	0	1	▲1
Force for Mexico	0	1	
Independents	3	0	▼3
Total	25	25	

2022 Quintana Roo gubernatorial election
Candidate	Party	Votes	%
Mara Lezama Espinosa	Morena	280,357	58.74
Laura Fernández Piña	Party of the Democratic Revolution	80,209	16.81
José Luis Pech Várguez	Citizen's Movement	65,286	13.68
Nivardo Mena Villanueva	Social Authentic Movement	35,318	7.40
Leslie Hendricks Rubio	Institutional Revolutionary Party	14,758	3.09
Non-registered candidates		1,320	0.28
Total		477,248	100.00
Valid votes		477,248	96.02
Invalid/blank votes		19,774	3.98
Total votes		497,022	100.00
Registered voters/turnout		1,228,606	40.45

=== Tamaulipas ===
The governorship of Tamaulipas was up for election.

2022 Tamaulipas gubernatorial election
Candidate	Party	Votes	%
Américo Villarreal Anaya	Morena	731,383	51.47
César Augusto Verástegui Ostos	National Action Party	642,800	45.24
Arturo Díez Gutiérrez	Citizen's Movement	46,182	3.25
Non-registered candidates		630	0.04
Total		1,420,995	100.00
Valid votes		1,420,995	97.68
Invalid/blank votes		33,785	2.32
Total votes		1,454,780	100.00
