= Juan Antonio Martín del Campo =

Mexican politician

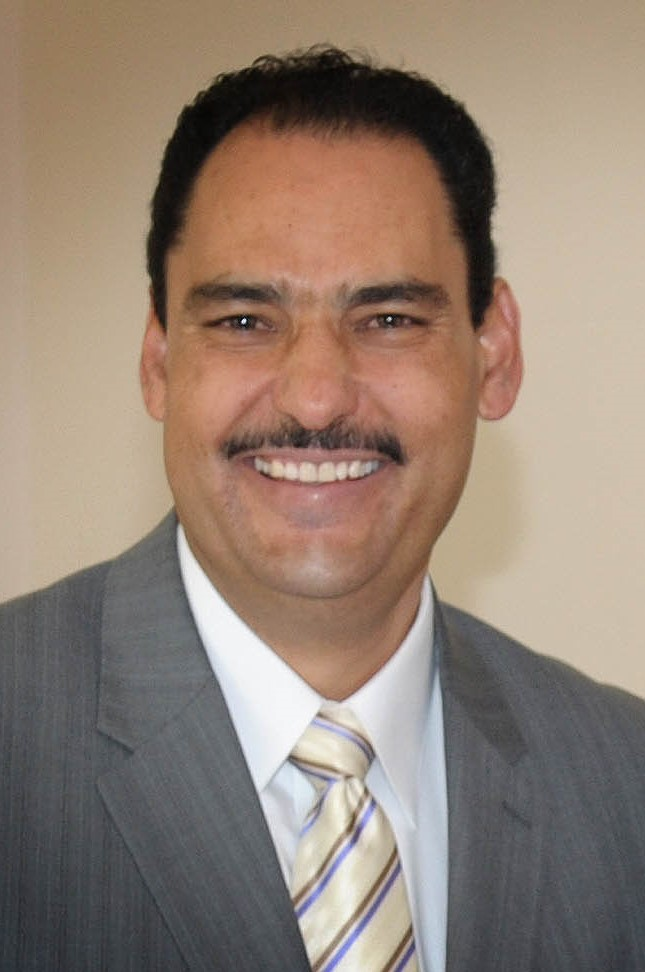
- Official portrait, 2014

Senator of the Congress of the Union for Aguascalientes
- Incumbent
- Assumed office 1 September 2018 Serving with Martha Márquez Alvarado and Daniel Gutiérrez Castorena
- Preceded by: Fernando Herrera Ávila

Municipal president of Aguascalientes
- In office January 1, 2014 – December 31, 2016

Personal details
- Born: February 7, 1972 (age 53); Aguascalientes, Aguascalientes, Mexico
- Political party: PAN
- Education: UAA; La Concordia University
- Occupation: Politician

Juan Antonio Martín del Campo (born February 7, 1972) is a Mexican politician affiliated with the National Action Party (PAN). Since September 1, 2018, he has been a senator of the Republic representing the state of Aguascalientes in the LXIV legislature of the Congress of the Union.

== Early life and education ==
Juan Antonio Martín del Campo Martín was born on February 7, 1972, in Aguascalientes, Mexico. He attended elementary school "Jesús Terán Paredo", junior high school number 4 "Leyes de Reforma" and high school CBTIS 195. He earned his bachelor's degree in civil engineering at the Autonomous University of Aguascalientes in 1995. From 2005 to 2007 he studied a master's degree in public policy at La Concordia University in Aguascalientes. He is married to María Elena Muñoz Franco and has two sons: Eric and Aldo.

== Career ==
He has been a member of the National Action Party (PAN) since 1998. In 2001 he was state counselor of the party in Aguascalientes and from 2002 to 2007 he was a national counselor of PAN, a position he held again in 2015. From 2004 to 2007 he was state president of the National Action Party in Aguascalientes.

From November 15, 2001, to November 14, 2004, he was a deputy of the Congress of Aguascalientes in the LVIII legislature representing District III. He served as president of the administration commission. He returned to his seat as a plurinominal deputy from November 15, 2007, to November 14, 2010, in the LX legislature. He was president of the board of directors and of the potable water commission.

In the 2013 state elections, he was elected municipal president of Aguascalientes with 40% of the votes cast in his favor. He held office from January 1, 2014, to December 31, 2016.

=== Senator of the Republic ===
In the 2018 federal elections, he was nominated by the National Action Party as senator for the state of Aguascalientes. After the elections, he occupied the position of second formula senator in the LXIV Legislature of the Congress of the Union since September 1, 2018. Within the congress he held the position of secretary of the agriculture, livestock, fisheries, and rural development commission.

On November 8, 2018, he was appointed by his party as its representative before the National Electoral Institute (INE).

Martín del Campo won re-election as senator for Aguascalientes in the 2024 Senate election, occupying the first place on the Fuerza y Corazón por México coalition's two-name formula.
