= Anayeli Muñoz Moreno =

Mexican politician

Senator of the Congress of Mexico
- In office 2018 – 24 January 2022
- Preceded by: Lorena Martínez Rodríguez

Local Deputy of the Congress of Aguascalientes
- In office 2013–2018

Personal details
- Born: 8 March 1984 (age 42) Aguascalientes City, Aguascalientes, Mexico
- Party: PVEM (2013–2018); MC (from 2018)
- Education: Autonomous University of Aguascalientes; Valley of Mexico University
- Occupation: Politician

Anayeli Muñoz Moreno (born March 8, 1984) is a Mexican politician, member of the Citizens' Movement party.

== Studies ==
She studied at the Autonomous University of Aguascalientes (UAA), studying a degree in Communication and graduating in 2007, she would study a master's degree in Public Administration at the Universidad del Valle de México (UVM) and graduating in 2021, and would also be a professor teaching for licenciatures to Communications, she is currently pursuing a master's degree in Public Policy at the Latin American Faculty of Social Sciences.

== Career ==
=== Background to politics ===
In 2003, she would work in the media, being a presenter, reporter, host and editor, she was also a correspondent for Notimex in Aguascalientes.

=== Political career ===
She was a local deputy of the Congress of Aguascalientes of the Ecologist Green Party of Mexico from 2013 to 2018. In 2018, she arrived at the Congress of Mexico as a replacement for Senator Lorena Martínez Rodríguez, being a member of the Movimiento Ciudadano (MC) party, and the becoming into the Technical Secretary of Unity of Gender, in 2022 she has been launched as a candidate for governor of Aguascalientes.
