= María de Jesús Díaz Marmolejo =

Mexican politician (born 1967)

Chuya Díaz

Senator of the Congress of the Union for Aguascalientes
- Incumbent
- Assumed office 1 September 2024
- Preceded by: Juan Antonio Martín del Campo

Deputy of the Congress of Aguascalientes
- In office 15 September 2021 – 31 August 2024
- Preceded by: Juan Guillermo Alaniz de León
- Succeeded by: Arlette Ivette Muñoz Cervantes

Personal details
- Born: María de Jesús Díaz Marmolejo; May 5, 1967 (age 59) Aguascalientes, Aguascalientes, Mexico
- Party: PAN

María de Jesús "Chuya" Díaz Marmolejo (born May 5, 1967) is a Mexican politician affiliated with the National Action Party (PAN). Since September 1, 2024, she has been a senator of the Republic representing the state of Aguascalientes in the LXVI legislature of the Congress of the Union. She was also a deputy of the Congress of Aguascalientes from 2021 to 2024.

== Biography ==
Díaz Marmolejo holds a law degree from the Technical Studies Institute OSMAR. She worked as a coordinator in the Congress of the Union from 2011 to 2013. She worked as a municipal delegate from 2014 to 2016. She served as the general coordinator for the Aguascalientes municipality from 2017 to 2021. She was elected to the LXV legislature of the Congress of Aguascalientes in 2021. In 2024, she was elected to the LXVI Legislature of the Mexican Congress alongside Juan Antonio Martín del Campo as a part of the Fuerza y Corazón por México coalition.
