= Martín Orozco Sandoval =

Mexican politician (born 1967)

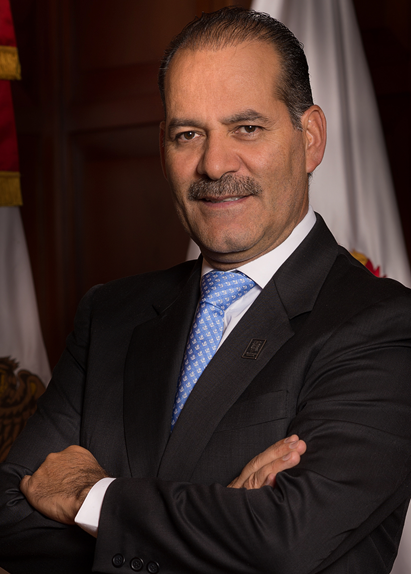

Governor of Aguascalientes
- In office 1 December 2016 – 30 September 2022
- Preceded by: Carlos Lozano de la Torre
- Succeeded by: María Teresa Jiménez Esquivel

Senator of the Congress of the Union for Aguascalientes
- In office 1 September 2012 – 4 February 2016
- Preceded by: Felipe González González
- Succeeded by: José de Jesús Santana García

Mayor of Aguascalientes
- In office 1 January 2005 – 31 December 2007
- Preceded by: Ricardo Magdaleno Rodríguez
- Succeeded by: Gabriel Arellano Espinosa

Personal details
- Born: 25 June 1967 (age 58) Santa María de los Ángeles, Jalisco, Mexico
- Party: National Action Party
- Education: Panamerican University (BA)
- Occupation: Accountant; Politician

Martín Orozco Sandoval (born 25 June 1967) is a Mexican politician affiliated with the PAN, who served as the Governor of Aguascalientes from 2016 to 2022. From 2012 to 2016, he represented Aguascalientes in the Senate during the LXII and LXIII Legislatures. He was also the Municipal President of Aguascalientes, from 2005 to 2007.

== Life ==
Orozco Sandoval worked as a private accountant from 1983 to 1995 and obtained his degree in accounting from the Universidad Panamericana, Bonaterra campus, in 1996. He began his career in the PAN not long after. From 1999 to 2001, he was the secretary of social development for the city of Aguascalientes, and in 2001, he left that post to become a state deputy to the LVII Legislature of Aguascalientes. There, he was the leader of the PAN parliamentary group.

In 2005, he ran successfully for municipal president of Aguascalientes and served two years; at the same time, he served as president of the Association of Municipalities of Mexico. In 2010, he made an unsuccessful run for governor, and two years later, he was elected to the Senate for the LXII and LXIII Legislatures. In the Senate, he presided over the Federalism Commission and served on four others, including Foreign Relations/Non-Governmental Organizations, Commerce and Industrial Promotion, and Finance and Public Credit.

On February 4, 2016, Orozco left the Senate in order to pursue another bid for Governor of Aguascalientes. In a close election, Orozco Sandoval and the PAN defeated the PRI candidate, Lorena Martínez Rodríguez, by just two percentage points.

== See also ==
- List of mayors of Aguascalientes
