= Fernando Gómez Esparza =

Mexican politician

Member of the Senate for Aguascalientes
- In office 1 September 2000 – 31 August 2006
- Preceded by: Enrique Franco Muñoz
- Succeeded by: Carlos Lozano de la Torre

Member of the Chamber of Deputies for Aguascalientes′s 3rd district
- In office 1 September 1997 – 31 August 2000
- Succeeded by: José Luis Novales Arellano

Municipal President of Aguascalientes
- In office 1 January 1993 – 31 December 1995
- Preceded by: María Alicia de la Rosa López
- Succeeded by: Alfredo Reyes Velázquez

Personal details
- Born: 21 August 1953 (age 72) Aguascalientes, Aguascalientes, Mexico
- Party: PRI
- Occupation: Economist and politician

Fernando Gómez Esparza (born 21 August 1953) is a Mexican politician affiliated with the Institutional Revolutionary Party. He served as Senator of the LVIII and LIX Legislatures of the Mexican Congress representing Aguascalientes and as Deputy of the 47 Legislature.

He earned his bachelor's degree in economics from the National Autonomous University of Mexico, which he later taught at in addition to the Autonomous University of Aguascalientes.

== See also ==
- List of mayors of Aguascalientes
