= María Alicia de la Rosa López =

Mexican politician

Municipal President of Aguascalientes
- In office 13 May 1991 – 31 December 1992
- Preceded by: Armando Romero Rosales
- Succeeded by: Fernando Gómez Esparza

Personal details
- Born: 12 October 1963 (age 62) Aguascalientes, Mexico
- Party: Institutional Revolutionary
- Parent(s): Antonio de la Rosa Acosta; Alicia López de De la Rosa
- Education: Autonomous University of Aguascalientes

María Alicia de la Rosa López (born 12 October 1963) is a Mexican politician affiliated with the Institutional Revolutionary Party. She served as Municipal President of Aguascalientes from 1991 to 1992 following the resignation of Armando Romero Rosales.

== See also ==
- List of mayors of Aguascalientes
