= Fernando Herrera Ávila =

Mexican politician (born 1968)

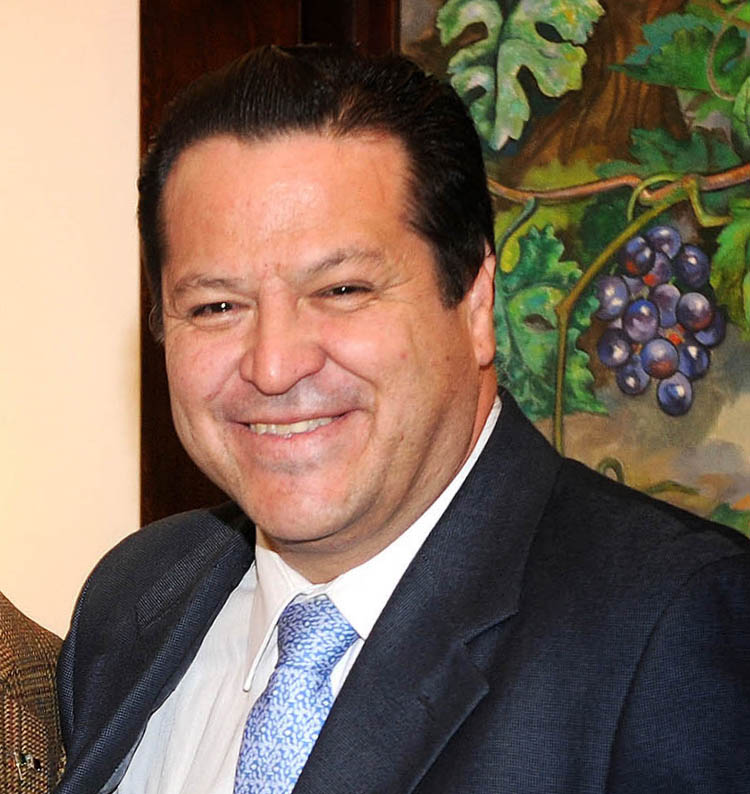
- Ávila in 2015

Senator of the Congress of the Union for Aguascalientes
- In office 1 September 2012 – 31 August 2018
- Preceded by: Rubén Camarillo Ortega
- Succeeded by: Juan Antonio Martín del Campo

Member of the Chamber of Deputies for Aguascalientes′s 2nd district
- In office 1 September 2000 – 31 August 2003
- Preceded by: Benjamín Gallegos Soto
- Succeeded by: Francisco Javier Valdés

Personal details
- Born: 6 August 1968 (age 57) Tabasco, Mexico
- Party: PAN
- Education: UAA; UVM
- Occupation: Senator

Fernando Herrera Ávila (born 6 August 1968) is a Mexican politician affiliated with the PAN. He currently serves as Senator of the LXII Legislature of the Mexican Congress representing Aguascalientes.

He also served as deputy of the Chamber of Deputies during the 2000-2003 legislature, and previously in the Congress of Aguascalientes.
