= Jefa Fabiana =

Mexican nurse and administrator

Fabiana Maribel Zepeda Arias
- Other name: Chief Fabiana
- Education: National Autonomous University of Mexico; Instituto Politécnico Nacional, and Autonomous University of Aguascalientes
- Occupations: Nurse and administrator

Fabiana Maribel Zepeda Arias, known as "Jefa Fabiana" or "Chief Fabiana," is a Mexican nurse and administrator. She heads the Division of Nursing Programs at the Mexican Social Security Institute. She is part of the team that spearheads government measures against the COVID-19 pandemic.

She studied at the National School of Nursing and Midwifery at National Autonomous University of Mexico, Instituto Politécnico Nacional, and Autonomous University of Aguascalientes.

On May 12, 2020, Chief Fabiana tested positive for COVID-19 and entered the hospital on May 15. She left after a few days following successful treatment.
