= Francisco Ramírez Martínez =

Mexican politician

Municipal President of Aguascalientes
- In office 1 January 1978 – 31 December 1980
- Preceded by: Felipe Reynoso Jiménez
- Succeeded by: Pedro Rivas Cuéllar

Personal details
- Born: 19 April 1943 (age 83) Aguascalientes, Mexico
- Party: Institutional Revolutionary
- Parent(s): Francisco Ramírez García; Serafina Martínez Vázquez
- Education: National Autonomous University of Mexico

Francisco Ramírez Martínez (born 19 April 1943) is a Mexican politician affiliated with the Institutional Revolutionary Party. He served as Municipal President of Aguascalientes from 1978 to 1980.

== See also ==
- List of mayors of Aguascalientes
