= Jesús Gómez Portugal =

Mexican politician and military officer

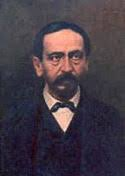

Governor of Aguascalientes
- In office 1867–1871
- Preceded by: José María Chávez Alonso
- Succeeded by: Carlos Barrón Letechipía

Personal details
- Born: 1820 Aguascalientes City, Aguascalientes
- Died: June 5, 1875 (aged 54–55) San Luis Potosí City, San Luis Potosí
- Party: Liberal
- Profession: Politician; Military Officer

Jesús Gómez Portugal Díaz (1820 – 5 June 5 1875) was a Mexican politician and military officer who served as Governor of the state of Aguascalientes.

== Biography ==
Gómez Portugal was born in the Aguascalientes City in 1820. Due to the Mexican–American War, he was discharged as a corporal in the Batallón de Aguascalientes (Aguascalientes Battalion), until obtaining the rank of colonel. Amid the instability he was elected Governor and military commander in 1857, he convened the Labor Club to organize and armed troops that he placed under the orders of Santos Degollado and sanctioned the Reform Laws. In 1863 he was deported to Paris. He hid the national flag that his squad carried, and upon his return he delivered it to the Congress of the State of Aguascalientes, where it is kept. He returned to continue fighting and occupy again in 1866 the governorship of the state, provisionally, appointed by Benito Juárez. He was elected constitutional governor for the period from December 1867 to 1871. In 1868 he sanctioned the new Constitution of the state, on October 18, in which the Reform Laws were enacted. He would die in exile in San Luis Potosí City in 1875.
