= Armando Romero Rosales =

Mexican politician

Member of the Chamber of Deputies for Aguascalientes′s 1st district
- In office 1 November 1991 – 31 October 1994
- Preceded by: Manuel González Díaz de León
- Succeeded by: María del Socorro Ramírez Ortega

Municipal President of Aguascalientes
- In office 1 January 1990 – 12 May 1991
- Preceded by: Héctor del Villar Martínez
- Succeeded by: María Alicia de la Rosa López

Personal details
- Born: 31 March 1950 (age 76) Aguascalientes, Mexico
- Party: PRI
- Parent(s): Primitivo Romero; Juana María Rosales
- Education: National Autonomous University of Mexico

Armando Romero Rosales (born 31 March 1950) is a Mexican politician affiliated with the Institutional Revolutionary Party (PRI). He served as Municipal President of Aguascalientes from 1990 until his resignation in 1991 to serve in the 55th session of Congress for Aguascalientes's 1st district.

== See also ==
- List of mayors of Aguascalientes
