= 2nd federal electoral district of Aguascalientes =

Federal electoral district of Mexico

Aguascalientes's 2nd
- Electoral district of the Chamber of Deputies of Mexico

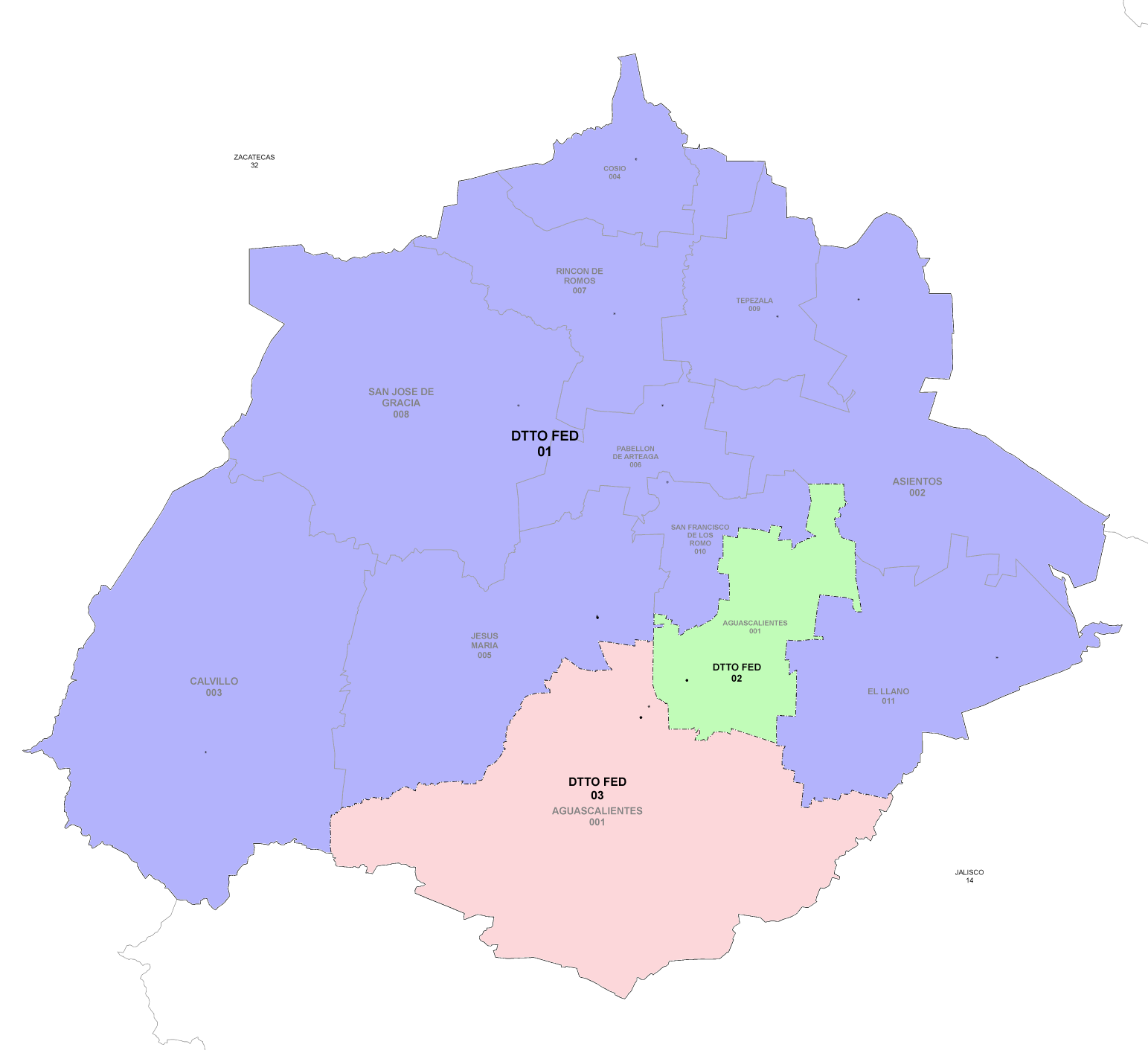
- 2nd district

Incumbent
- Member: Mónica Becerra Moreno
- Party: ▌National Action Party
- Congress: 66th (2024–2027)

District
- State: Aguascalientes
- Head town: Aguascalientes
- Coordinates: 21°53′N 102°18′W
- Covers: Municipality of Aguascalientes (part)
- PR region: Second
- Precincts: 195
- Population: 472,112 (2020 census)

The 2nd federal electoral district of Aguascalientes (Spanish: Distrito electoral federal 02 de Aguascalientes) is one of the 300 electoral districts into which Mexico is divided for elections to the federal Chamber of Deputies and one of three such districts in the state of Aguascalientes.

It elects one deputy to the lower house of Congress for each three-year legislative session by means of the first-past-the-post system. Votes cast in the district also count towards the calculation of proportional representation ("plurinominal") deputies elected from the second region.

The current member for the district, elected in the 2024 general election, is Mónica Becerra Moreno of the National Action Party (PAN).

== District territory ==
Under the 2023 districting plan adopted by the National Electoral Institute (INE), which is to be used for the 2024, 2027 and 2030 federal elections, the 2nd district covers 195 electoral precincts (secciones electorales) in the north-east of the municipality of Aguascalientes. (Note: The 3rd district covers the remainder of the municipality.)

The district's head town (cabecera distrital), where results from individual polling stations are gathered together and tallied, is the state capital, the city of Aguascalientes. The district reported a population of 472,112 in the 2020 census.

== Previous districting schemes ==
Evolution of electoral district numbers
| | 1974 | 1978 | 1996 | 2005 | 2017 | 2023 |
|---|---|---|---|---|---|---|
| Aguascalientes | 2 | 2 | 3 | 3 | 3 | 3 |
| Chamber of Deputies | 196 | 300 | | | | |

2017–2022

In the 2017 scheme, the 2nd district covered 192 precincts in the north-east of the municipality of Aguascalientes.

2005–2017

Under the 2005 redistricting process, it was made up of 120 precincts in the eastern portion of the municipality of Aguascalientes.

1996–2005

Aguascalientes gained its third congressional seat in 1996. The reconfigured 2nd district covered 164 precincts in the northern portion of the municipality of Aguascalientes.

1978–1996

The districting scheme in force from 1978 to 1996 was the result of the 1977 electoral reforms, which increased the number of single-member seats in the Chamber of Deputies from 196 to 300. Aguascalientes's seat allocation, however, remained unchanged at two. The 2nd district covered the entire state except for the city of Aguascalientes.

== Deputies returned to Congress ==
(Mexico) National parties
- Current
- PAN
- PRI
- PT
- PVEM
- MC
- Morena
- PAZ
- Somos
- Defunct or local only
- PLM
- PNR
- PRM
- PNM
- PP
- PPS
- PARM
- PFCRN
- CON
- PANAL
- PSD
- PES
- PES
- PRD

Aguascalientes's 2nd district
| Election | Deputy | Party | Term | Legislature |
|---|---|---|---|---|
| 1916 | Daniel Cervantes Gutiérrez | | 1916–1917 | Constituent Congress of Querétaro |
| 1917 | Enrique Muñoz | | 1917–1918 | 27th Congress |
| 1918 | Enrique Fernández Ledesma | | 1918–1920 | 28th Congress |
| 1920 | Rodrigo Palacio | | 1920–1922 | 29th Congress |
| 1922 | Rodrigo Palacio | | 1922–1924 | 30th Congress |
| 1924 | Manuel Carpio | | 1924–1926 | 31st Congress |
| 1926 | Isaac Díaz de León | | 1926–1928 | 32nd Congress |
| 1928 | Rafael Quevedo | PVA | 1928–1930 | 33rd Congress |
| 1930 | Pedro Quevedo | | 1930–1932 | 34th Congress |
| 1932 | Pedro Quevedo | | 1932–1934 | 35th Congress |
| 1934 | José de Lara | | 1934–1937 | 36th Congress |
| 1937 | Pedro Quevedo | | 1937–1940 | 37th Congress |
| 1940 | Vicente Madrigal Guzmán | | 1940–1943 | 38th Congress |
| 1943 | Manuel Moreno Sánchez | | 1943–1946 | 39th Congress |
| 1946 | Roberto J. Rangel | | 1946–1949 | 40th Congress |
| 1949 | Salvador Luévano Romo | | 1949–1952 | 41st Congress |
| 1952 | Benito Palomino Dena | | 1952–1955 | 42nd Congress |
| 1955 | Alberto Alcalá de Lira | | 1955–1958 | 43rd Congress |
| 1958 | Enrique Olivares Santana | | 1958–1961 | 44th Congress |
| 1961 | Carmen Araiza López | | 1961–1964 | 45th Congress |
| 1964 | Augusto Gómez Villanueva | | 1964–1967 | 46th Congress |
| 1967 | José Refugio Esparza Reyes | | 1967–1970 | 47th Congress |
| 1970 | Baudelio Lariz Lariz | | 1970–1973 | 48th Congress |
| 1973 | Higinio Chávez Marmolejo | | 1973–1976 | 49th Congress |
| 1976 | Augusto Gómez Villanueva; Camilo López Gómez | | 1976–1977; 1977–1979 | 50th Congress |
| 1979 | Gilberto Romo Nájera | | 1979–1982 | 51st Congress |
| 1982 | Héctor Hugo Olivares Ventura | | 1982–1985 | 52nd Congress |
| 1985 | Miguel Ángel Barberena Vega; Alberto Alcalá de Lira | | 1985–1986; 1986–1988 | 53rd Congress |
| 1988 | Augusto Gómez Villanueva | | 1988–1991 | 54th Congress |
| 1991 | Javier Rangel Hernández | | 1991–1994 | 55th Congress |
| 1994 | Héctor Hugo Olivares Ventura | | 1994–1997 | 56th Congress |
| 1997 | Benjamín Gallegos Soto | | 1997–2000 | 57th Congress |
| 2000 | Fernando Herrera Ávila | | 2000–2003 | 58th Congress |
| 2003 | Francisco Javier Valdés de Anda | | 2003–2006 | 59th Congress |
| 2006 | Ernesto Ruiz Velasco | | 2006–2009 | 60th Congress |
| 2009 | David Hernández Vallín | | 2009–2012 | 61st Congress |
| 2012 | María Teresa Jiménez Esquivel | | 2012–2015 | 62nd Congress |
| 2015 | Arlette Ivette Muñoz Cervantes | | 2015–2018 | 63rd Congress |
| 2018 | Elba Lorena Torres Díaz | | 2018–2021 | 64th Congress |
| 2021 | Mónica Becerra Moreno | | 2021–2024 | 65th Congress |
| 2024 | Mónica Becerra Moreno | | 2024–2027 | 65th Congress |

== Presidential elections ==
Aguascalientes's 2nd district
| Election | District won by | Party or coalition | % |
|---|---|---|---|
| 2018 | Andrés Manuel López Obrador | Juntos Haremos Historia | 45.0182 |
| 2024 (Note: Despite losing in the 1st and 2nd districts, Aguascalientes was the only state where Xóchitl Gálvez of the Fuerza y Corazón por México coalition won a plurality of the vote.) | Claudia Sheinbaum Pardo | Sigamos Haciendo Historia | 47.0117 |
