= José Refugio Esparza Reyes =

Mexican politician

Governor of Aguascalientes
- In office 1 December 1974 – 30 November 1980
- Preceded by: Francisco Guel Jiménez
- Succeeded by: Rodolfo Landeros Gallegos

Member of the Chamber of Deputies for Aguascalientes′s 2nd district
- In office 1 September 1967 – 31 August 1970
- Preceded by: Augusto Gómez Villanueva
- Succeeded by: Baudelio Lariz Lariz

Personal details
- Born: August 23, 1921 Mexiquito, Viudas de Oriente, Villa Juárez, Aguascalientes
- Died: November 12, 2015 (aged 94) Aguascalientes City, Mexico
- Party: PRI

José Refugio Esparza Reyes (August 23, 1921 – November 12, 2015) was a Mexican teacher, politician and member of the Institutional Revolutionary Party (PRI). He served as the Governor of the Mexican state of Aguascalientes from 1974 until 1980.

Esparza Reyes was born on August 23, 1921, in the former village of Mexiquito, located in the community of Viudas de Oriente, Villa Juárez, Aguascalientes. The village of Mexiquito, his birthplace, no longer exists.

He created a number of state social programs, notably Operation Bee (Operación Abeja), which promoted citizen participation and transparency in rural areas.

José Refugio Esparza Reyes was hospitalized on November 11, 2015. He died at a private hospital in Aguascalientes City on November 12, 2015, at the age of 94. The Aguascalientes state government and Governor Carlos Lozano de la Torre declared two days of mourning from November 12–13, 2015. His funeral, accompanied by honor guards, was held at the state Government Palace.
