= Ángel Talamantes Ponce =

Mexican politician

Municipal President of Aguascalientes
- In office 1 January 1972 – 31 December 1974
- Preceded by: Carlos Macias Arellano
- Succeeded by: Felipe Reynoso Jiménez

Personal details
- Born: 22 December 1917 Parral, Chihuahua, Mexico
- Party: Institutional Revolutionary
- Parent(s): Gustavo L. Talamantes; Carmen Ponce
- Education: National Autonomous University of Mexico

Ángel Talamantes Ponce (born 22 December 1917) was a Mexican politician affiliated with the Institutional Revolutionary Party. He served as Municipal President of Aguascalientes from 1972 to 1974.

== See also ==
- List of mayors of Aguascalientes
