= Raúl Cuadra García =

Mexican politician (born 1953)

Member of the Chamber of Deputies for Aguascalientes′s 3rd district
- In office 1 September 2009 – 31 August 2012
- Preceded by: Alma Hilda Medina Macías
- Succeeded by: José Ángel González Serna

Personal details
- Born: 10 June 1953 (age 73) Aguascalientes, Aguascalientes, Mexico
- Party: PAN
- Education: UAA
- Occupation: Politician

Raúl Gerardo Cuadra García (born 10 June 1953) is a Mexican politician from the National Action Party (PAN). From 2009 to 2012, he served as a deputy in the 61st Congress, representing the third district of Aguascalientes.
