= Barberena (surname) =

Barberena is a surname. Notable people with the surname include:

- Bryan Barberena (born 1989), American mixed martial artist
- Marline Barberena (born 1987), Nicaraguan-American beauty pageant winner
- Miguel Ángel Barberena Vega (1928–1999), Mexican Navy officer and politician
