= Gabriel Arellano Espinosa =

Mexican politician

Francisco Gabriel Arellano Espinosa is a Mexican politician, a member of the Moviento Regenaración Nacional (MORENA), and former municipal president of the Aguascalientes municipality. He also served in the Congress of Aguascalientes from 2010 to 2013, as a member of the Institutional Revolutionary Party (PRI) before leaving the party in 2015.

== See also ==
- List of mayors of Aguascalientes
