= Luis Armando Reynoso =

Mexican politician

Luis Armando Reynoso Femat

Governor of Aguascalientes
- In office 1 December 2004 – 30 November 2010
- Preceded by: Juan Jose Leon Rubio
- Succeeded by: Carlos Lozano de la Torre

Municipal President of Aguascalientes
- In office 1 January 1999 – 31 December 2001
- Preceded by: Alfredo Reyes Velázquez
- Succeeded by: Ricardo Magdaleno Rodríguez

Personal details
- Born: 15 August 1957 (age 69) Aguascalientes, Aguascalientes
- Party: PAN
- Spouse: Carmelin López de Reynoso
- Education: Monterrey Institute of Technology and Higher Education
- Profession: Civil Engineer

Luis Armando Reynoso Femat (born 15 August 1957) founded “El grupo Inmobiliario Reynoso Femat” which are companies dedicated to the promotion, construction and sale of housing.

In 1985, he was vice-president of the Mexican council of the industry of Housing IN 1989–1990 President of the Rotarian Club of Campestre Aguascalientes and President of the Association of Industrial Promoters of states Housing.

He was jailed for 6 years. Reynoso Femat was sentenced to prison for the crimes of peculation and misuse of public exercise on August 31, 2019.

== As a member of the National Action Party (Partido Acción Nacional) ==
In 1994 he became a member of the Party Action National (National Action Party)

In 1998 he won his party's primary election as a candidate for Mayor of Aguascalientes and on August 2 of that same year he was elected Mayor. His victory confirmed the National Action Party in the capital city of the state with the highest voting in the history of Aguascalientes.

== As Aguascalientes City Mayor ==
In January 1999 Luis Armando Reynoso Femat was inaugurated as Aguascalientes City Mayor and was qualified as the best County Mayors of the Mexican Republic by journalistic, financial and evaluating companies of the government.

During his term, Luis Armando obtained 14 ISO 9000 certificates for various organizations.

== As promoter of sports and development of Aguascalientes ==
Because of the promotion he did in Aguascalientes Luis Armando was named honorary president of the Patronato de Fomento de Futbol, A.C:

Furthermore, on August 6 Emilio Azcaraga President of Televisa, inaugurated with Luis Armando Reynoso the country club of Necaxa that is located at the west of the city, it has an extension of 8 hectares and it has grand facilities that guarantee the excellent mental and physical preparation of the players.

He benefited financially with the acquisition of Necaxa which his organization had bought. Before the stadium opened, its administration had sold high end boxes with an approximate cost of $100,000 which were considered a good investment until the poor performance of the soccer team proved it wrong, descending to the second division of Mexican soccer on 2009 (Primera División A).

== See also ==
- List of mayors of Aguascalientes

Preceded by Juan José León Rubio	Governor of Aguascalientes; 2004 — 2010	Succeeded by Carlos Lozano de la Torre
