= Carlos Macías =

Carlos Macías may refer to:

- Carlos Macias Arellano (born 1931), Mexican politician
- Carlos Fuentes Macías (1928–2012), Mexican writer
- Carlos Jiménez Macías (born 1950), Mexican politician
- Carlos Manuel Urzúa Macías (born 1955), Mexican economist
- Carlos Tello Macías (born 1938), Mexican economist

== See also ==
- Macías
- Carlos Maciá (born 2008), Spanish footballer
