= Héctor Manuel del Villar Martínez =

Mexican politician

Municipal President of Aguascalientes
- In office 1 January 1987 – 31 December 1989
- Preceded by: Miguel Romo Medina
- Succeeded by: Armando Romero Rosales

Personal details
- Born: 23 September 1937 Aguascalientes, Mexico
- Died: 5 February 2017 (aged 79) Aguascalientes, Mexico
- Party: Institutional Revolutionary
- Parent(s): José Ramiro del Villar García; Graciela Martínez Valdivia

Héctor Manuel del Villar Martínez (23 September 1937 – 5 February 2017) was a Mexican politician affiliated with the Institutional Revolutionary Party. He served as Municipal President of Aguascalientes from 1987 to 1989.

== See also ==
- List of mayors of Aguascalientes
