= Miguel Romo Medina =

Mexican politician

Member of the Senate for Aguascalientes
- In office 1 September 2012 – 31 August 2018
- Preceded by: Norma Esparza
- Succeeded by: Daniel Gutiérrez Castorena

Municipal President of Aguascalientes
- In office 1 January 1984 – 31 December 1986
- Preceded by: Pedro Rivas Cuéllar
- Succeeded by: Héctor del Villar Martínez

Personal details
- Born: 19 January 1949 (age 77) Aguascalientes, Aguascalientes, Mexico
- Party: PRI
- Parent(s): Miguel Romo Jiménez; Carmen Medina Mora
- Education: UNAM
- Occupation: Senator

Miguel Romo Medina (born 19 January 1949) is a Mexican politician affiliated with the PRI. He currently serves as Senator of the LXII Legislature of the Mexican Congress representing Aguascalientes. He also was Municipal President of Aguascalientes, Aguascalientes during the 1984-1986 period.

== See also ==
- List of mayors of Aguascalientes
