= Felipe Reynoso Jiménez =

Mexican politician (1919–2019)

Municipal President of Aguascalientes
- In office 1 January 1975 – 31 December 1977
- Preceded by: Ángel Talamantes Ponce
- Succeeded by: Francisco Ramírez Martínez

Secretary General of Government
- In office 1 December 1962 – 30 November 1968
- Governor: Enrique Olivares Santana
- Preceded by: Manuel Varela Quezada
- Succeeded by: Ángel Talamantes Ponce

Personal details
- Born: January 2, 1919 Jalostotitlán, Jalisco, Mexico
- Died: November 8, 2019 (aged 100)
- Party: Institutional Revolutionary
- Parent(s): José Refugio Reynoso Padilla; Eugenia Jiménez Martín

Felipe Reynoso Jiménez (January 2, 1919 – November 8, 2019) was a Mexican politician affiliated with the Institutional Revolutionary Party. He served as Municipal President of Aguascalientes from 1975 to 1977.

== See also ==
- List of mayors of Aguascalientes
