= Martha Márquez Alvarado =

Mexican politician (born 1984)

Senator of the Republic from Aguascalientes First formula
- In office 1 September 2018 – 31 August 2024
- Preceded by: José de Jesús Santana García
- Succeeded by: Juan Antonio Martín del Campo

Personal details
- Born: Martha Cecilia Márquez Alvarado; 29 July 1984 (age 42) Aguascalientes, Aguascalientes, Mexico
- Party: PT
- Other political affiliations: PAN
- Occupation: Politician

Martha Cecilia Márquez Alvarado (born 29 July 1984) is a Mexican politician. She has been a Senator for Aguascalientes from the Labor Party since 2018. A graduate of the Autonomous University of Aguascalientes, she also served in the LXII Legislature of the Congress of Aguascalientes from 2013 to 2016.

== Early years ==
Martha Cecilia Márquez Alvarado was born on 29 July 1984 in the city of Aguascalientes, Mexico. She attended elementary school "Rosa Trillo Lopez", Technical High School No. 1 and high school at CBTIS 39. He studied accounting at the Universidad Autónoma de Aguascalientes. Due to her parents' militancy in the National Action Party she began to get involved with this organization since childhood, becoming state coordinator of her youth group and later occupying several administrative positions within the party.

== Public Positions ==
Martha Márquez Alvarado was auditor of the finance secretariat of the municipality of Aguascalientes in 2006 and auditor in the Superior Auditing Body of the State of Aguascalientes from 2008 to 2011.

From 2013 to 2016 she was a plurinominal deputy of the Congress of the State of Aguascalientes in the LXII legislature. She was coordinator of the National Action Party bench in the congress and president of the recreation and sports commission.

Within the governorship of Martin Orozco Sandoval she served as secretary of welfare and social development of the state from 1 December 2016 to 9 November 2017 and as secretary of auditing and accountability from 10 November 2017 to 1 January 2018. During 2018 she was head of the Comptroller's Office of the State of Aguascalientes.

== Senator of the Republic ==
In the 2018 federal elections she was nominated by the National Action Party as senator for the state of Aguascalientes. After the elections she occupied the position as first formula senator in the LXIV Legislature of the Congress of the Union since 1 September 2018. Within the congress she holds the position of secretary of the health commission.

On 12 November 2021 she made public her resignation from her membership in the National Action Party as well as her parliamentary group in the Senate, stating that it is due to her disagreement with the national leadership of the party headed by Marko Cortés Mendoza.

On 18 January 2022 she announced her incorporation to the Partido del Trabajo's parliamentary group in order to be nominated by such party as candidate for governor in the state elections of that year.

== Candidate for Governor ==
In the Aguascalientes state elections of 2022, she was nominated as candidate for governor by the coalition "Trabajando Verde por Aguascalientes", formed by the Partido del Trabajo and the Partido Verde Ecologista de México. On May 31, the last day of the campaigns, she declined her candidacy in favor of the candidate of the Movimiento Regeneración Nacional party, Nora Ruvalcaba Gámez. In the June 6 elections she received 1.5% of the votes cast.
