= Pedro Rivas =

Pedro Rivas may refer to:

- Pedro Rivas (basketball) (1945–2007), Panamanian basketball player
- Pedro Geoffroy Rivas (1908–1979), Salvadoran anthropologist, poet, and linguist
- Pedro Rivas Cuéllar (1917–2008), Mexican politician and radio pioneer
- Pedro Rivas Vicuña (1876–1938), Chilean politician
