= Alfredo Reyes Velázquez =

Mexican politician

Senator to the Congress of the Union for Aguascalientes First Formula
- In office 1 September 2000 – 31 August 2006
- Preceded by: Óscar López Velarde
- Succeeded by: Felipe González González

Municipal President of Aguascalientes
- In office 1 January 1996 – 31 December 1998
- Preceded by: Fernando Gómez Esparza
- Succeeded by: Luis Armando Reynoso Femat

Personal details
- Born: Alfredo Martín Reyes Velázquez; 15 December 1953 (age 72) León, Guanajuato, Mexico
- Party: PAN
- Education: Aguascalientes Institute of Technology
- Occupation: Politician

Alfredo Martín Reyes Velázquez (born 15 December 1953) is a Mexican politician affiliated with the National Action Party. He served as Senator of the LVIII and LIX Legislatures of the Mexican Congress representing Aguascalientes.

== See also ==
- List of mayors of Aguascalientes
