= David Hernández Vallín =

Mexican politician

Member of the Chamber of Deputies for Aguascalientes's 2nd district
- In office 1 September 2009 – 31 August 2012
- Preceded by: Ernesto Ruiz Velasco
- Succeeded by: María Teresa Jiménez Esquivel

Personal details
- Born: 21 November 1967 (age 58) Aguascalientes, Aguascalientes, Mexico
- Party: PRI
- Occupation: Politician

David Hernández Vallín (born 21 November 1967) is a Mexican politician from the Institutional Revolutionary Party (PRI). From 2009 to 2012 he served in the Chamber of Deputies during the 61st Congress representing Aguascalientes's 2nd district. He previously served as a local deputy in the LX Legislature of the Congress of Aguascalientes.
