= Ernesto Ruiz Velasco =

Mexican politician

Member of the Chamber of Deputies for Aguascalientes's 2nd district
- In office 1 September 2006 – 31 August 2009
- Preceded by: Francisco Javier Valdés
- Succeeded by: David Hernández Vallín

Personal details
- Born: 27 August 1969 (age 56) Aguascalientes, Aguascalientes, Mexico
- Party: PAN
- Occupation: Politician

Ernesto Ruiz Velasco de Lira (born 27 August 1969) is a Mexican politician affiliated with the National Action Party (PAN). In the 2006 general election he was elected to the Chamber of Deputies to represent Aguascalientes's 2nd district during the 60th session of Congress.
