= Jaime del Conde Ugarte =

Mexican politician (born 1962)

Member of the Chamber of Deputies for Aguascalientes's 3rd district
- In office 1 September 2003 – 31 August 2006
- Preceded by: José Luis Novales Arellano
- Succeeded by: Alma Hilda Medina Macías

Personal details
- Born: 25 April 1962 (age 63) Mexico City, Mexico
- Party: PAN
- Education: ITAM
- Occupation: Politician

Jaime del Conde Ugarte (born 25 April 1962) is a Mexican politician affiliated with the National Action Party (PAN). From 2003 to 2006, he served as a federal deputy in the 59th Congress, representing the third district of Aguascalientes.
