= Juan José León Rubio =

Mexican politician

Governor of Aguascalientes
- In office August 25, 2004 – November 30, 2004
- Preceded by: Felipe González González
- Succeeded by: Luis Armando Reynoso

Personal details
- Born: Atemajac, Jalisco
- Party: PAN
- Profession: Lawyer

Juan José León Rubio is a former Governor of Aguascalientes.

Juan José León Rubio obtained his law degree from National Autonomous University of Mexico and has a master's degree from the University of Guadalajara. For 25 years he served as an official at the Secretariat of Finance and Public Credit.

León Rubio was Secretary of Finance and Administration of Aguascalientes between 1998 and 2004, during the governorship of Felipe González González. When Gonzalez left office on August 26, 2004 to join the cabinet of Vincent Fox, León Rubio was appointed interim governor.

On December 7, 2006, León Rubio was appointed Oficial Mayor of the Secretariat of the Interior, until January 19, 2008, when he was replaced by Abel Ignacio Cuevas Melo.

Preceded by Felipe González González	Governor of Aguascalientes; 2004	Succeeded by Luis Armando Reynoso
