= Tere Jiménez =

Mexican politician

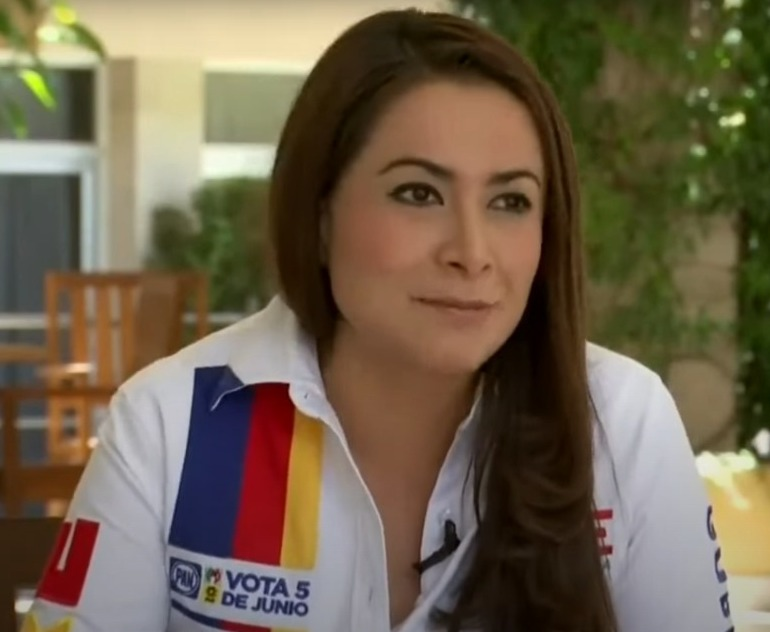
- Jiménez in 2022

Governor of Aguascalientes
- Incumbent
- Assumed office 1 October 2022
- Preceded by: Martín Orozco Sandoval

Member of the Chamber of Deputies for Aguascalientes's 2nd district
- In office 1 September 2012 – 31 August 2015
- Preceded by: David Hernández Vallín
- Succeeded by: Arlette Ivette Muñoz Cervantes

Personal details
- Born: María Teresa Jiménez Esquivel; 25 May 1984 (age 42) Valle de Bravo, State of Mexico
- Party: PAN
- Education: Autonomous University of Aguascalientes
- Occupation: Politician

María Teresa Jiménez Esquivel (born 25 May 1984) is a Mexican politician affiliated with the National Action Party (PAN). She served as mayor of Aguascalientes as well as a federal deputy in the 62nd Congress (2012–2015), representing the second district of Aguascalientes.

She is the Governor of Aguascalientes for the 2022–2027 term, and the first woman to govern the state.
