= Benjamín Gallegos Soto =

Mexican politician

Senator to the Congress of the Union for Aguascalientes Second Formula
- In office 1 September 2000 – 31 August 2006
- Preceded by: Juan Fernando Palomino Topete
- Succeeded by: Rubén Camarillo Ortega

Member of the Chamber of Deputies for Aguascalientes′s 2nd district
- In office 1 September 1997 – 31 August 2000
- Preceded by: Héctor Hugo Olivares Ventura
- Succeeded by: Fernando Herrera Ávila

Personal details
- Born: 22 April 1960 Calvillo, Aguascalientes, Mexico
- Died: 27 November 2018 (aged 58)
- Party: PAN
- Parent(s): Gonzalo Gallegos Serna; María de los Ángeles Soto Rodríguez
- Occupation: Politician

Benjamín Gallegos Soto (22 April 1960 – 27 November 2018) was a Mexican politician affiliated with the National Action Party. He served as Senator of the LVIII and LIX Legislatures representing Aguascalientes and as Deputy of the LVII Legislature.
