= Norias del Paso Hondo =

- town
- Location in Mexico
- Coordinates: 21°51′28.08″N 102°12′21.6″W
- Country: Mexico
- State: Aguascalientes
- Municipality: Aguascalientes

Population (2010)
  - Total: 2,539
- Time zone: UTC−6 (CST)
  - Summer (DST): UTC−5 (CDT)

Norias del Paso Hondo is a town in the state of Aguascalientes, Mexico. It is located 6 miles east-southeast of the city of Aguascalientes and has a population of 2,539.
