= Desiderio Macías Silva =

Mexican poet and medical doctor

Desiderio Macías Silva (March 31, 1922 – February 1995) was a Mexican poet and medical doctor born in Asientos, Aguascalientes. He served as president of the Autonomous University of Aguascalientes.

== Biography and career ==
After a rural childhood in semi-deserted landscapes, Macías Silva went to study to the Conciliar Seminar of Aguascalientes. Afterwards he moved to Mexico City, where he studied medicine at the National Autonomous University of Mexico, known as UNAM. Here he joined the cultural association Netzahualcoyotl, where he published poetry in the journal Espiral, among many others. Back in Aguascalientes, he participated in the literary group Paralelo and was awarded the first prize in the Juegos Florales contest, prize that he was awarded again in 1972 for his book Ascuario, when this award became the prestigious National Poetry Prize Aguascalientes. He was a professor at the Autonomous University of Aguascalientes, he was the creator of the motto of this university: "Se lumen proferre" and was also the president of the university for many years.

The Biblioteca Central (Central Library) of the Autonomous University of Aguascalientes was named after him in 2013. An international poetry prize, the Premio Internacional de Poesía "Desiderio Macías Silva" is named after him.

== Works of poetry ==
- Ascuario (Joaquín Mortiz, Mexico, 1973)
- Poemas (Oasis, Mexico, 1983 - Includes Ascuario, Jaspe y Sardónix, Pentagrazul, y Paraskeví)
- Jaspe y Sardónix (Autonomous University of Aguascalientes, Mexico, 1985)
- Pentagrazul (Autonomous University of Aguascalientes, Mexico, 1989 - Includes Ascuario, Pentagrazul, Jaspe y Sardónix, y Relámpagos la sangre)
- Pentagrazul (Verbum, Madrid, 1993)
- Apocatástasis (Autonomous University of Aguascalientes, Mexico, 1994 - Includes Icosaedro, Relámpagos la sangre, y Jaspe y Sardónix)
