= Javier Rangel Hernández =

Mexican politician

Member of the Chamber of Deputies for Aguascalientes's 2nd district
- In office 1 September 1991 – 31 August 1994
- Preceded by: Augusto Gómez Villanueva
- Succeeded by: Héctor Hugo Olivares Ventura

Personal details
- Born: Mexico
- Party: Institutional Revolutionary
- Occupation: Politician

Javier Rangel Hernández (Note: In this Mexican name, the surname is Rangel and the second or maternal family name is Hernández.) is a Mexican politician affiliated with the Institutional Revolutionary Party (PRI). In the 1991 mid-terms, he was elected to the Chamber of Deputies to represent the 2nd district of Aguascalientes during the 55th Congress.
