= Patricia Flores Elizondo =

Mexican politician (born 1968)

Member of the Chamber of Deputies
- Incumbent
- Assumed office 1 September 2024
- Constituency: First electoral region

Personal details
- Born: 6 February 1968 (age 58) Durango, Durango, Mexico
- Party: Citizens' Movement (since 2022)

Patricia Flores Elizondo (born 6 February 1968) is a Mexican politician affiliated with the Citizens' Movement (MC) serving as a plurinominal member of the Chamber of Deputies since 2024.

From 2008 to 2010, she served as chief of staff to President Felipe Calderón. In the 2022 local elections, she contended unsuccessfully for the governorship of Durango, her home state.
