= Daniel Gutiérrez Castorena =

Mexican politician (born 1954)

Senator of the Republic from Aguascalientes First minority
- In office 1 September 2018 – 31 August 2024
- Preceded by: Miguel Romo Medina
- Succeeded by: Nora Ruvalcaba Gámez

Personal details
- Born: 20 December 1954 (age 71)
- Party: Morena
- Education: National Autonomous University of Mexico; Autonomous University of Zacatecas; Autonomous University of Aguascalientes; Universidad Autónoma Metropolitana
- Occupation: Politician

Daniel Gutiérrez Castorena (born 20 December 1954) is a Mexican politician who was elected a MORENA Senator from Aguascalientes in the 2018 general election.

Gutiérrez Castorena graduated from the National Autonomous University of Mexico, the Autonomous University of Zacatecas, the Autonomous University of Aguascalientes and Universidad Autónoma Metropolitana.

He is seeking re-election as senator for Aguascalientes in the 2024 Senate election. He is placed second on the Sigamos Haciendo Historia coalition's two-name formula.
