= Carlos Macias Arellano =

Mexican politician

Municipal President of Aguascalientes
- In office 1 January 1969 – 31 December 1971
- Preceded by: Juan Morales Morales
- Succeeded by: Ángel Talamantes Ponce

Personal details
- Born: 3 July 1931 Aguascalientes, Mexico
- Party: Institutional Revolutionary
- Parent(s): Rafael Macias Peña; Matilde Arellano
- Education: National Autonomous University of Mexico

Carlos Macias Arellano (born 3 July 1931) was a Mexican politician affiliated with the Institutional Revolutionary Party. He served as Municipal President of Aguascalientes from 1969 to 1971.

== See also ==
- List of mayors of Aguascalientes
