= Villa Licenciado Jesús Terán =

- locality
- Location in Mexico
- Coordinates: 21°49′25″N 102°11′15″W
- Country: Mexico
- State: Aguascalientes
- Municipality: Aguascalientes

Population (2010)
  - Total: 4,481
- Time zone: UTC−6 (CST)
  - Summer (DST): UTC−5 (CDT)

Villa Licenciado Jesús Terán, known among its inhabitants as Calvillito, is a locale in the state of Aguascalientes. It is located 8 miles southeast of the city of Aguascalientes and has a population of 4,481.

== Climate ==
Climate data for Villa Licenciado Jesús Terán (1991–2020)
| Month | Jan | Feb | Mar | Apr | May | Jun | Jul | Aug | Sep | Oct | Nov | Dec | Year |
|---|---|---|---|---|---|---|---|---|---|---|---|---|---|
| Record high °C (°F) | 29 (84) | 32 (90) | 35 (95) | 35 (95) | 39 (102) | 38 (100) | 35 (95) | 34 (93) | 35 (95) | 33 (91) | 32 (90) | 33 (91) | 39 (102) |
| Mean daily maximum °C (°F) | 21.7 (71.1) | 23.7 (74.7) | 26.4 (79.5) | 28.8 (83.8) | 30.5 (86.9) | 28.9 (84.0) | 26.4 (79.5) | 26.5 (79.7) | 25.7 (78.3) | 25.0 (77.0) | 23.7 (74.7) | 22.3 (72.1) | 25.8 (78.4) |
| Daily mean °C (°F) | 11.2 (52.2) | 12.7 (54.9) | 15.0 (59.0) | 17.4 (63.3) | 19.9 (67.8) | 20.6 (69.1) | 19.3 (66.7) | 19.0 (66.2) | 18.3 (64.9) | 16.1 (61.0) | 13.3 (55.9) | 11.6 (52.9) | 16.2 (61.2) |
| Mean daily minimum °C (°F) | 0.6 (33.1) | 1.7 (35.1) | 3.6 (38.5) | 6.1 (43.0) | 9.2 (48.6) | 12.3 (54.1) | 12.1 (53.8) | 11.5 (52.7) | 10.9 (51.6) | 7.1 (44.8) | 3.0 (37.4) | 0.9 (33.6) | 6.6 (43.9) |
| Record low °C (°F) | −9 (16) | −9 (16) | −9 (16) | −6 (21) | −1 (30) | 4 (39) | 4 (39) | 5 (41) | 0 (32) | −3 (27) | −8 (18) | −10 (14) | −9 (16) |
| Average precipitation mm (inches) | 17.0 (0.67) | 12.2 (0.48) | 6.8 (0.27) | 5.8 (0.23) | 23.0 (0.91) | 98.7 (3.89) | 133.0 (5.24) | 119.3 (4.70) | 100.2 (3.94) | 35.8 (1.41) | 10.6 (0.42) | 9.5 (0.37) | 571.9 (22.52) |
Source: Servicio Meteorológico Nacional
