= José Ángel González Serna =

Mexican politician (born 1959)

Member of the Chamber of Deputies for Aguascalientes's 3rd district
- In office 1 September 2012 – 31 August 2015
- Preceded by: Raúl Cuadra García
- Succeeded by: Jorge López Martin

Personal details
- Born: 12 August 1959 (age 66) Aguascalientes, Aguascalientes, Mexico
- Party: PAN
- Occupation: Politician

José Ángel González Serna (born 12 August 1959) is a Mexican politician affiliated with the National Action Party (PAN). In the 2012 general election he was elected to the Chamber of Deputies to represent Aguascalientes's 3rd district during the 62nd session of Congress.
