= Francisco Javier Valdés de Anda =

Mexican politician (born 1956)

Member of the Chamber of Deputies for Aguascalientes's 2nd district
- In office 1 September 2003 – 31 August 2006
- Preceded by: Fernando Herrera Ávila
- Succeeded by: Ernesto Ruiz Velasco

Personal details
- Born: 19 October 1956 (age 69) Aguascalientes, Mexico
- Party: PAN
- Occupation: Politician

Francisco Javier Valdés de Anda (born 19 October 1956) is a Mexican politician affiliated with the National Action Party (PAN). In the 2003 mid-terms he was elected to the Chamber of Deputies to represent Aguascalientes's 2nd district during the 59th session of Congress.
