= 3rd federal electoral district of Aguascalientes =

Federal electoral district of Mexico

Aguascalientes's 3rd
- Electoral district of the Chamber of Deputies of Mexico

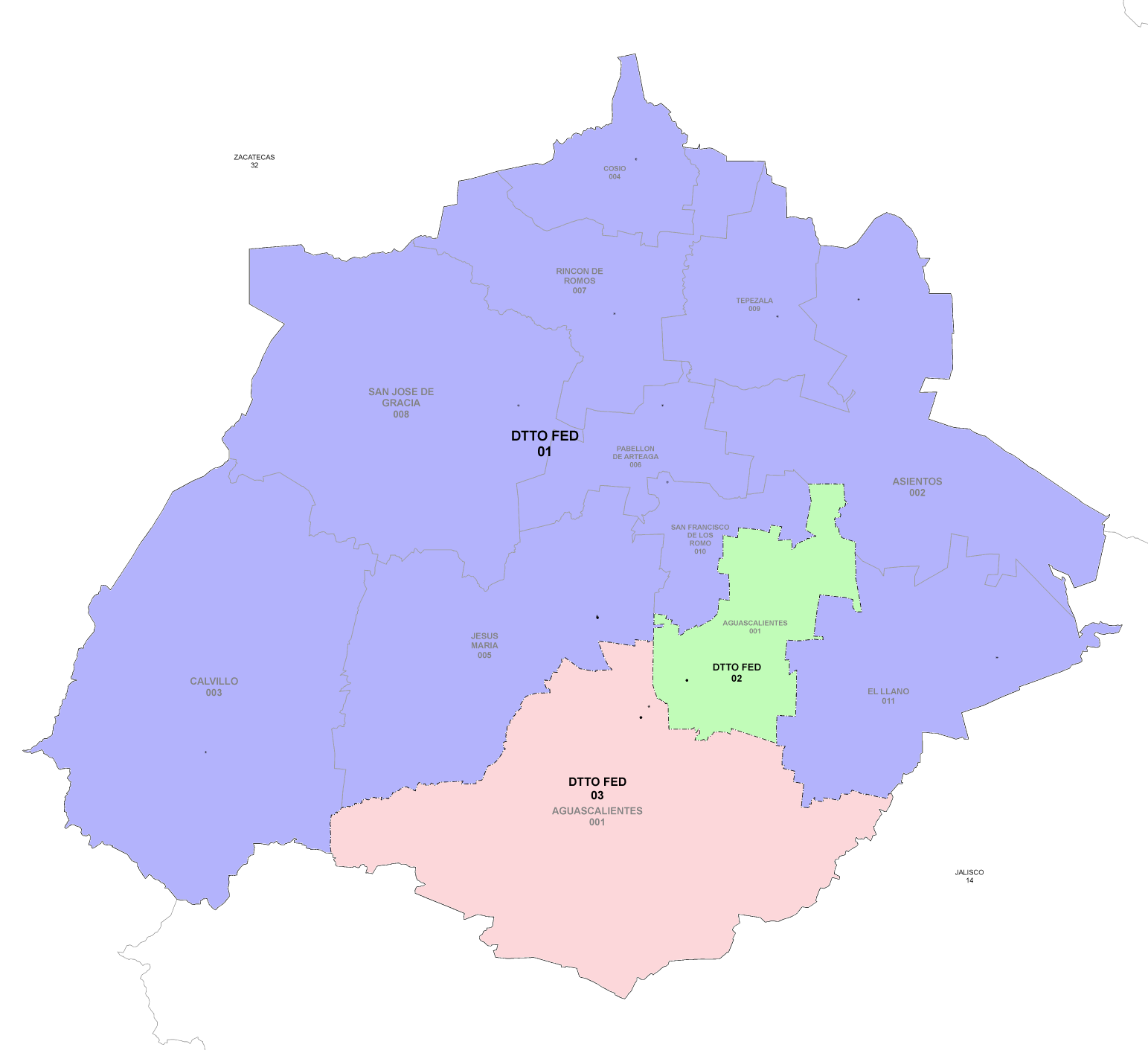
- 3rd district

Incumbent
- Member: Paulo Gonzalo Martínez López
- Party: ▌National Action Party
- Congress: 66th (2024–2027)

District
- State: Aguascalientes
- Head town: Aguascalientes
- Coordinates: 21°53′N 102°18′W
- Covers: Municipality of Aguascalientes (part)
- PR region: Second
- Precincts: 292
- Population: 470,584 (2020 census)

The 3rd federal electoral district of Aguascalientes (Spanish: Distrito electoral federal 03 de Aguascalientes) is one of the 300 electoral districts into which Mexico is divided for elections to the federal Chamber of Deputies and one of three such districts in the state of Aguascalientes.

It elects one deputy to the lower house of Congress for each three-year legislative session by means of the first-past-the-post system. Votes cast in the district also count towards the calculation of proportional representation ("plurinominal") deputies elected from the second region.

The 3rd district was re-established as part of the 1996 redistricting process and has returned deputies to Congress since the 1997 mid-term election. The current member for the district, re-elected in the 2024 general election, is Paulo Gonzalo Martínez López of the National Action Party (PAN).

== District territory ==
Under the 2023 districting plan adopted by the National Electoral Institute (INE), which is to be used for the 2024, 2027 and 2030 federal elections, the 3rd district covers 292 electoral precincts (secciones electorales) in the south of the municipality of Aguascalientes. (Note: The 2nd district covers the remainder of the municipality.)

The district's head town (cabecera distrital), where results from individual polling stations are gathered together and tallied, is the state capital, the city of Aguascalientes, Ags. The district reported a population of 470,584 in the 2020 census.

== Previous districting schemes ==
Evolution of electoral district numbers
	1974	1978	1996	2005	2017	2023
Aguascalientes	2	2	3	3	3	3
Chamber of Deputies	196	300				

2017–2022

In the 2017 scheme, the 2nd district covered 260 precincts in the south of the municipality of Aguascalientes.

2005–2017

Under the 2005 redistricting process, it was made up of 217 precincts in the western portion of the municipality of Aguascalientes.

1996–2005

Aguascalientes gained its third congressional seat in 1996. The new district covered 173 precincts in the south of the municipality of Aguascalientes.

== Deputies returned to Congress ==
(Mexico) National parties
- Current
- PAN
- PRI
- PT
- PVEM
- MC
- Morena
- PAZ
- Somos
- Defunct or local only
- PLM
- PNR
- PRM
- PNM
- PP
- PPS
- PARM
- PFCRN
- CON
- PANAL
- PSD
- PES
- PES
- PRD

Aguascalientes's 3rd district
Election	Deputy	Party	Term	Legislature
The third district was suspended between 1902 and 1996
1997	Fernando Gómez Esparza	Institutional Revolutionary Party	1997–2000	57th Congress
2000	José Luis Novales Arellano	National Action Party (Mexico)	2000–2003	58th Congress
2003	Jaime del Conde Ugarte	National Action Party (Mexico)	2003–2006	59th Congress
2006	Alma Hilda Medina Macías	National Action Party (Mexico)	2006–2009	60th Congress
2009	Raúl Cuadra García	National Action Party (Mexico)	2009–2012	61st Congress
2012	José Ángel González Serna	National Action Party (Mexico)	2012–2015	62nd Congress
2015	Jorge López Martín	National Action Party (Mexico)	2015–2018	63rd Congress
2018	Martha Elisa González Estrada	National Action Party (Mexico)	2018–2021	64th Congress
2021	Paulo Gonzalo Martínez López	National Action Party (Mexico)	2021–2024	65th Congress
2024	Paulo Gonzalo Martínez López	National Action Party (Mexico)	2024–2027	66th Congress

== Presidential elections ==
Aguascalientes's 3rd district
Election	District won by	Party or coalition	%
2018	Ricardo Anaya Cortés	Por México al Frente	37.8940
2024 (Note: Despite losing in the 1st and 2nd districts, Aguascalientes was the only state where Gálvez won a plurality of the vote.)	Bertha Xóchitl Gálvez Ruiz	Fuerza y Corazón por México	53.8246
