= Pocitos, Aguascalientes =

Pocitos
- Locality
- Location in Mexico
- Coordinates: 21°54′42.98″N 102°19′33.6″W
- Country: Mexico
- State: Aguascalientes
- Municipality: Aguascalientes

Population (2010)
  - Total: 5,169
- Time zone: UTC−6 (CST)

Pocitos is an inhabited place in the state of Aguascalientes. It is located 3 miles northwest of the city of Aguascalientes and has a population of 5,169.
