= Miguel Ángel Barberena Vega =

Mexican Naval officer and politician (1928-1999)

Miguel Angel Barberena Vega
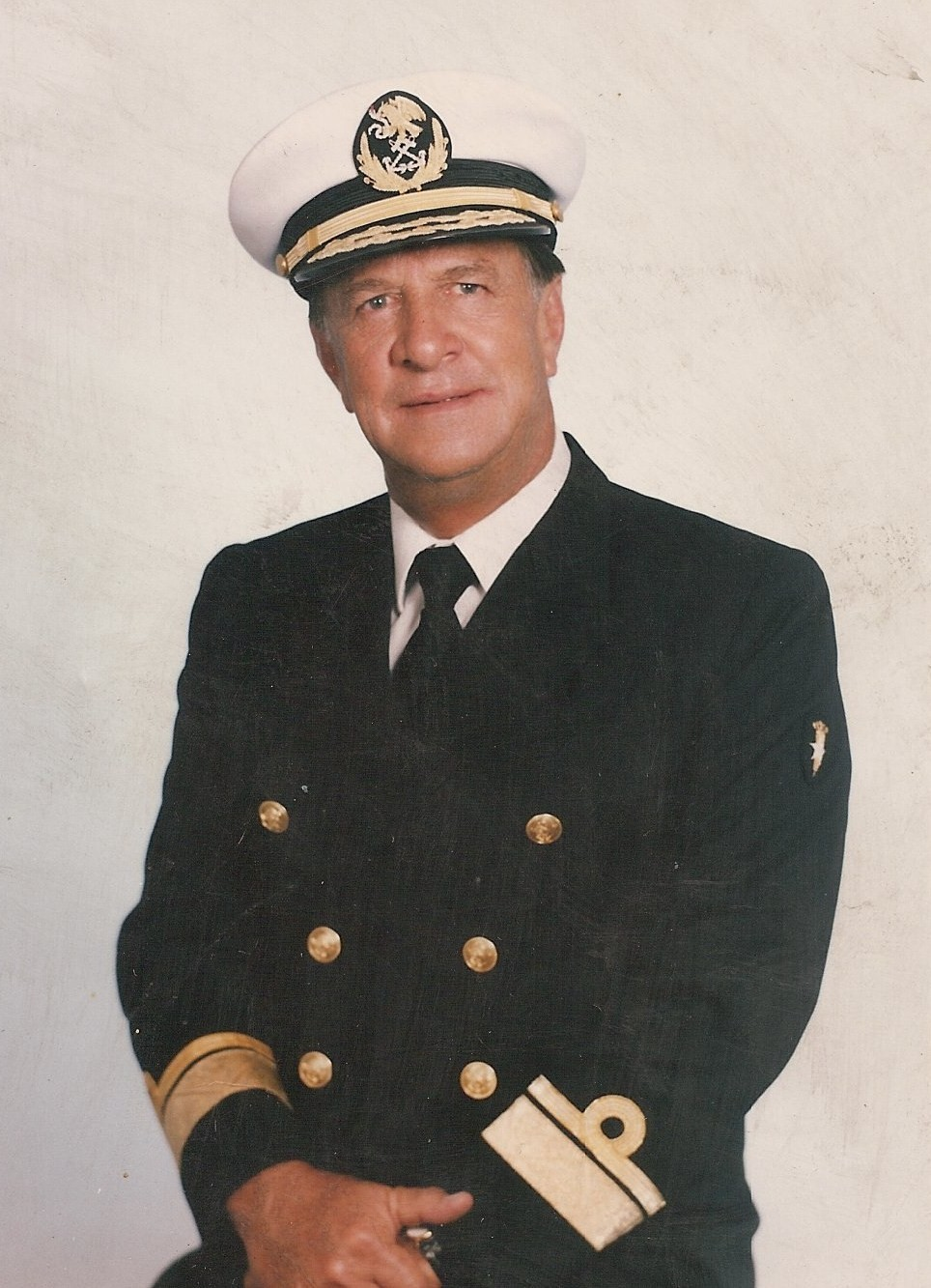

Governor of Aguascalientes
- In office 1 December 1986 – 30 November 1992
- Preceded by: Rodolfo Landeros Gallegos
- Succeeded by: Otto Granados Roldán

Member of the Chamber of Deputies for Aguascalientes′s 2nd district
- In office 1 September 1985 – 17 June 1986
- Preceded by: Héctor Hugo Olivares Ventura
- Succeeded by: Alberto Alcalá de Lira

Senator for Aguascalientes
- In office 1 September 1970 – 31 August 1976
- Preceded by: Luis Gómez Zepeda
- Succeeded by: Héctor Hugo Olivares Ventura

Personal details
- Born: August 4, 1928 Jesús María, Aguascalientes
- Died: June 16, 1999 (aged 70) Pabellón de Artega, Aguascalientes
- Party: PRI
- Spouse: Miriam Cruz Valdes
- Education: Autonomous University of Aguascalientes; University of Michigan
- Profession: Geographical Engineer

Miguel Ángel Barberena Vega (4 August 1928 – 16 June 1999) was a Mexican Naval officer and politician.

== Early life ==
Miguel Ángel Barberena Vega was born in Jesús María, Aguascalientes, the capital city of the Free and Sovereign State of Aguascalientes, Mexico, on August 4, 1928. (One source asserts he was born in Madrid, Spain, on that same date).) He spent his childhood in an old Hacienda called "Los Cuartos". He died at Pabellón de Arteaga, Aguascalientes in June 1999.

Barberena Vega attended the municipal school of Jesús Maria and the "Sons of the Army" school in Cuernavaca Morelos. He performed his middle school as well as high school studies at the Autonomous Institute of Sciences, now called Autonomous University of Aguascalientes.

Barberena Vega finished high school in 1946, and in 1947, he joined the Mexico Navy. He received the degree of Geographical Engineer of the Heroic Naval Military School, graduating in 1951, earning the class' highest grades.

== Military career ==
He was commissioned for various units of the Mexican Navy as a midshipman and served on the Gulf coast and in the Pacific. In January 1953, he passed his professional examination for the title of Geographer Engineer and obtained the rank of Lieutenant Commander General of the Mexican Army Corps.

He was commissioned to various units of the Navy as a gunnery officer and Chief of Navigation.

== Academic career ==
In May 1955, he won a scholarship given by the University of Veracruz to study at the University of Michigan, where he completed graduate studies in Nuclear Engineering.

In 1958, he was commissioned into the Navy Department at the University of Veracruz where he became a full-time professor in its School of Engineering at the Port of Veracruz. That same year, he lectured at the Heroic Naval Academy and was appointed Secretary of the Engineering Faculty.

In 1961, when the Veracruzana University created its Institute of Science, he was appointed Founding Director. In December 1962 he was invited by the National Polytechnic Institute (IPN) to take over the National Computer Center in Mexico City and set up an IBM-709, the largest computer in Latin America in its time (1963).

== Politician ==
On December 1, 1964 he was appointed General Director of Railways in Operation, under the Secretariat of Communications and Transportation, by agreement of the President Gustavo Díaz Ordaz. (1964–1970). In 1970, during the presidential campaign of Luis Echeverría Álvarez, he was appointed Officer of the Institute of Political, Economic and Social Studies (IEPES in Spanish) in the state of Veracruz.

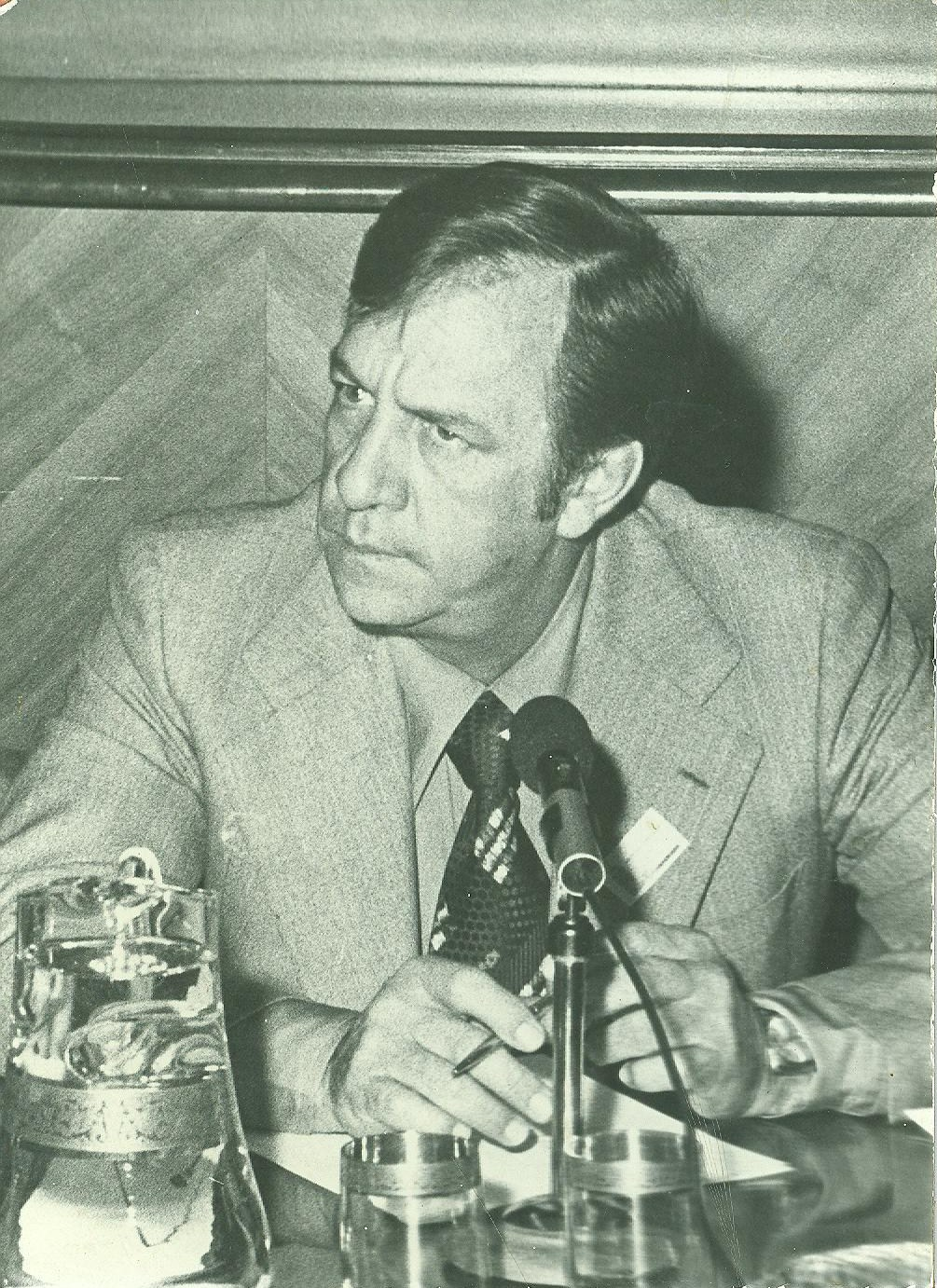
Miguel Ángel Barberena Vega in Veracruz

In 1970, he occupied a [curule] seat as Senator, representing his home state in the XLIX and XLVIII Legislatures. He joined a partisan task committee, first in 1971, as the officer of the National Confederation of Popular Organizations (CNOP in Spanish) in the State of Nuevo León, and then as General Delegate to the Institutional Revolutionary Party (PRI in the State of Baja California Norte.

In March 1973, he became Secretary General of the National Executive Committee (CEN) of the PRI), and at the same time was a Professor of the Faculty of Engineering of the National Autonomous University of Mexico (UNAM) from 1968–1974.

In October 1975, at the end of his term as Secretary General, he was appointed General Delegate in the State of Jalisco. In March 1976, he was appointed General Delegate in the State of Baja California. He was designated as PRI's CEN regional officer during the campaign of José López Portillo.

On December 1, 1976, he was designated Subsecretary of Communications and Transportation, ending his term in 1982. At the conclusion of his management in this position in September 1981, he joined Miguel de la Madrid as political adviser of the Ministry of Press and Propaganda of the Executive Committee for the PRI national campaign.

In January 1983, he was appointed General Delegate of the PRI's National Executive Committee (CEN) in South Baja California, and in March 1984 for the State of Hidalgo.

On September 20, 1984, he was promoted to the rank of Rear Admiral by President de la Madrid.

He was positioned by the Institutional Revolutionary Party as their Federal Deputy candidate for the second district of Aguascalientes to which he was elected on July 7, 1985. He was a member of the Electoral College and served as Secretary of the Board. He was Chairman of the Committee on Energy during the Legislature and member of the Committee of Communications, Transportation and Marine.

On May 30, 1986, he was designated as the PRI pre-candidate to the State Government. By December 1986, he took the office of Constitutional Governor of the State for the period 1986–1992.

When his term ended, he became leader of the Popular Sector of the PRI presidential campaigns of Luis Donaldo Colosio and Ernesto Zedillo during the years 1993–1994.

Within the Navy of Mexico, he held the rank of Vice-Admiral.

He married Miriam Cruz Valdez, with whom he had 6 children: Miguel Angel, Marco Antonio (†), Mario Alberto (†), Manuel Alejandro (†), Martín Andrés, and Marina.

Vega died on 17 June 1999.

=== Achievements ===
He supported industrialization and trade, created the Institute of Housing, created the commercial corridor of Expoplaza and the expansion of the Bullring. The Aguascalientes-León and Aguascalientes Theater highways promoted the creation of the Office of Citizen Protection. He also initiated proceedings for the recovery of the Arquitos Cultural Centre. [needs further reference/discussion]
