= Alma Hilda Medina Macías =

Mexican politician (born 1976)

Member of the Chamber of Deputies for Aguascalientes's 3rd district
- In office 1 September 2006 – 31 August 2009
- Preceded by: Jaime del Conde Ugarte
- Succeeded by: Raúl Cuadra García

Personal details
- Born: 2 December 1976 (age 49) Aguascalientes, Mexico
- Party: PAN
- Occupation: Politician

Alma Hilda Medina Macías (born 2 December 1976) is a Mexican politician affiliated with the National Action Party (PAN). From 2006 to 2009, she served as a federal deputy in the 60th Congress, representing the third district of Aguascalientes.
