= Augusto Gómez Villanueva =

Mexican politician (born 1929)

President of the Chamber of Deputies
- In office 1 September 1965 – 30 September 1965
- Preceded by: Alfonso Martínez Domínguez
- Succeeded by: Vicente Fuentes Díaz

Member of the Chamber of Deputies for the 2nd Circumscription
- In office 1 September 2000 – 31 August 2003
- Constituency: Aguascalientes
- In office 1 September 1994 – 31 August 1997
- Constituency: Aguascalientes

Member of the Chamber of Deputies for Aguascalientes′s 2nd district
- In office 1 September 1988 – 31 August 1991
- Preceded by: Alberto Alcalá de Lira
- Succeeded by: Javier Rangel Hernández
- In office 1 September 1976 – 27 September 1977
- Preceded by: Higinio Chávez Marmolejo
- Succeeded by: Camilo López Gómez
- In office 1 September 1964 – 31 August 1967
- Preceded by: Carmen Araiza López
- Succeeded by: José Refugio Esparza Reyes

Personal details
- Born: 23 July 1929 (age 96) Aguascalientes, Aguascalientes, Mexico
- Party: Institutional Revolutionary
- Occupation: Politician

Augusto Gómez Villanueva (born 23 July 1929) is a Mexican politician affiliated with the Institutional Revolutionary Party. He served as Senator of the XLVIII and XLIX Legislatures of the Mexican Congress representing Aguascalientes and as Deputy of the XLVI, L, LIV, LVI, and LVIII Legislatures.

He was the President of the Chamber of Deputies in 1965.
