= Pedro Rivas Cuéllar =

Mexican politician and broadcaster

Municipal President of Aguascalientes
- In office 1 January 1981 – 31 December 1983
- Preceded by: Francisco Ramírez Martínez
- Succeeded by: Miguel Romo Medina

Personal details
- Born: 30 June 1917 Aguascalientes, Mexico
- Died: 15 October 2008 (aged 91) Aguascalientes, Mexico
- Party: Institutional Revolutionary
- Parent(s): Antonio Rivas Toledo; Julia Cuéllar Romo

Pedro Rivas Cuéllar (30 June 1917 – 15 October 2008) was a Mexican politician and radio pioneer affiliated with the Institutional Revolutionary Party. He served as Municipal President of Aguascalientes from 1981 to 1983. In 1936 he founded XEBI-AM, the first radio station in central Mexico, which grew into a multi-station broadcaster known as Radiogrupo.

== See also ==
- List of mayors of Aguascalientes
