= Norias de Ojocaliente =

- Locality
- Location in Mexico
- Coordinates: 21°53′21.48″N 102°12′57.6″W
- Country: Mexico
- State: Aguascalientes
- Municipality: Aguascalientes

Population (2010)
  - Total: 3,741
- Time zone: UTC−6 (CST)
  - Summer (DST): UTC−5 (CDT)

Norias de Ojocaliente is an inhabited place around an ejido in the state of Aguascalientes. It is located 5 miles east of the city of Aguascalientes and has a population of 3,741.
