= Norma Esparza =

Mexican politician

Member of the Senate for Aguascalientes
- In office 1 February 2010 – 31 August 2012
- Preceded by: Carlos Lozano de la Torre
- Succeeded by: Miguel Romo Medina

Personal details
- Born: 23 November 1967 (age 58) Aguascalientes, Aguascalientes, Mexico
- Party: PRI
- Occupation: Senator

Norma Esparza Herrera (born 23 November 1967) is a Mexican politician affiliated with the PRI. She served as Senator of the LXI Legislature of the Mexican Congress representing Aguascalientes.
