= List of municipal presidents of Aguascalientes =

The following is a list of municipal presidents of Aguascalientes Municipality, Mexico.

== List of officials ==
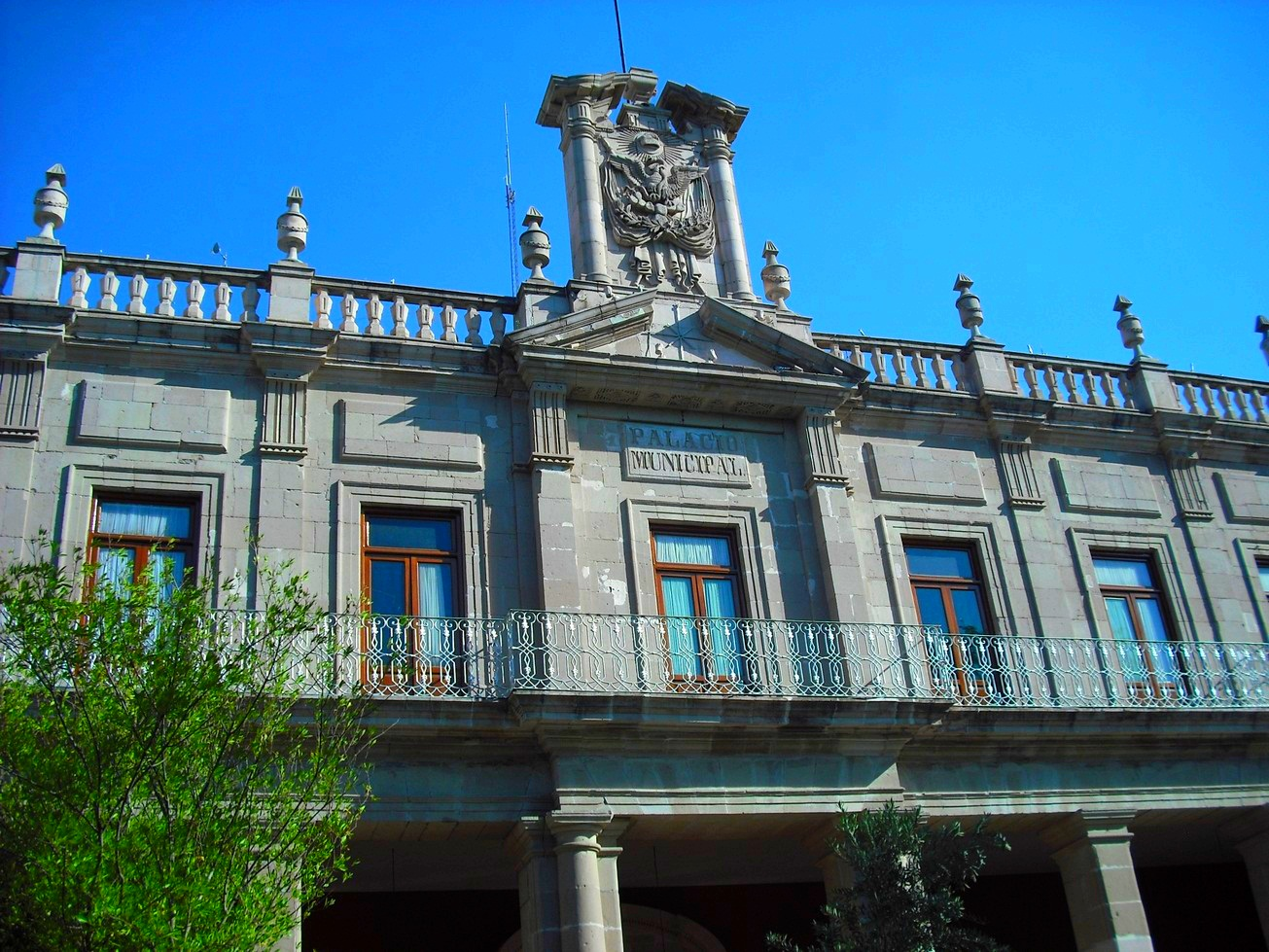
Palacio Municipal, Aguascalientes (photo 2009)

- José López Nava, 1830
- Pedro García Rojas, 1835
- Jesús Terán Peredo, 1848-1849
- Atanacio Rodríguez, 1842-1851, 1856
- Luis Chávez, 1857
- Antonio Rayón, 1845-1858, 1860-1861
- Diego Pérez O., 1860,1866-1867
- Francisco Hornedo, 1870
- Librado Gallegos, 1870
- Jacobo Jaime, 1870
- Rodrigo Rincón, 1871-1874
- Patricio de la Vega, 1875
- Miguel Guinchard, 1878
- Manuel Cardona, 1869-1870
- Luis de la Rosa, 1875-1881
- Alejandro Vázquez del Mercado, 1884-1886
- Isaac de la Peña, 1884-1888
- Ignacio Ortíz, 1895
- Daniel Cervantes, 1897-1898
- Felipe Ruiz, 1899-1900
- Tomás Medina Ugarte, 1903
- Zeferino Muñoz, 1903
- Francisco Armengol, 1907-1908
- José Cruz, 1911
- Feliz Chavoyo, 1913
- Jesús Martínez, 1913
- Evaristo Femat, 1906, 1913
- José A. Pinedo, 1914
- Domingo Velasco, 1914
- Alfredo Muñoz, 1914
- Benito Díaz, 1915
- Eugenio Ávila, 1915
- Marcelino Macías, 1923
- Samuel J. Guerra, 1923
- Alfonso Rodríguez, 1923
- Genaro Castillo, 1924
- Juan Ibarra, 1923-1924
- Manuel Chávez, 1924
- José López, 1925
- Gabriel Carmona, 1925
- Pablo Ramírez, 1925-1926
- Benjamín de la Mora, 1927
- Rodolfo Rodarte, 1927
- Ezequiel Viveros, 1915
- Francisco Llamas, 1916
- Vicente Magdaleno, 1916
- Heladio Hernández, 1916
- Ricardo Rodríguez, 1917
- Rodrigo Palacios, 1918
- José Díaz Morán, 1918
- Vidal Roldán, 1920
- Felipe Torres, 1921
- J. Guadalupe Zamarripa, 1921
- Victorino Médina, 1922
- Aurelio Padilla, 1927
- Enrique Montero, 1928
- Alberto del Valle, 1928
- Rafael Quevedo Morán, 1929
- Gonzalo Ruvalcaba, 1930
- Pedro Vital, 1932
- Concepción Rodríguez, 1939-1940
- Roberto Jefkins, 1940
- Celestino López, 1941-1942
- Francisco Revilla, 1942-1943
- José Medina, 1944
- Enrique Osornio, 1945-1947
- Jaime Aizpuru, 1951-1953
- Antonio Medina, 1954-1956
- Carmelita Martín del Campo, 1957-1959
- Gilberto Lòpez Velarde, 1960-1962
- Francisco Guel Jiménez, 1963-1965
- Juan Morales Morales, 1966-1968
- Carlos Macias Arellano, 1969-1971
- Ángel Talamantes Ponce, 1972-1974
- Felipe Reynoso Jiménez, 1975-1977
- Francisco Ramírez Martínez, 1978-1980
- Pedro Rivas Cuéllar, 1981-1983
- Miguel Romo Medina, 1984-1986
- Héctor Manuel del Villar Martínez, 1987-1989
- Armando Romero Rosales, 1990-1991
- María Alicia de la Rosa López, 1991-1992
- Fernando Gómez Esparza, 1993-1995
- Alfredo Reyes Velázquez, 1996-1998
- Luis Armando Reynoso, 1999-2001
- Ricardo Magdaleno, 2002-2004
- Martín Orozco Sandoval, 2005-2007
- Gabriel Arellano Espinosa, 2008-2009
- Adrián Ventura Dávila, 2010
- Lorena Martínez Rodríguez, 2011-2013
- Juan Antonio Martín del Campo Martín del Campo, 2014-2016
- Juana Cecilia López Ortiz, 2021, interim
- María Teresa Jiménez Esquivel, 2017-2021
- Juana Cecilia López Ortiz, 2021, interim
- Leonardo Montañez Castro, 2022-present

== See also ==
- Aguascalientes state elections, 2016
- Aguascalientes state elections, 2019
- Timeline of Aguascalientes City
- List of municipal presidents of Aguascalientes state, 2017-2019 (in Spanish)
- List of municipal presidents of Aguascalientes state, 2019-2021 (in Spanish)
