= Rubén Camarillo Ortega =

Mexican politician

Senator of the Congress of the Union for Aguascalientes
- In office 1 September 2006 – 31 August 2012
- Preceded by: Benjamín Gallegos Soto
- Succeeded by: Fernando Herrera Ávila

Personal details
- Born: 13 November 1961 (age 64) Aguascalientes, Aguascalientes, Mexico
- Party: PAN
- Education: Aguascalientes Institute of Technology
- Occupation: Deputy

Rubén Camarillo Ortega (born 13 November 1961) is a Mexican politician affiliated with the PAN. He currently serves as Deputy of the LXII Legislature of the Mexican Congress representing Aguascalientes. He also served as Senator during the LX and LXI Legislatures.

He is a chemical engineer graduated from the Instituto Tecnológico de Aguascalientes and has a master's degree in Petroleum and Petrochemical Technological Sciences from the Instituto Tecnológico de Ciudad Madero. He also holds a law degree from Centro de Estudios Superiores del Estado de Aguascalientes and is currently pursuing a master's degree in Corporate Law.
