= Governor of Aguascalientes =

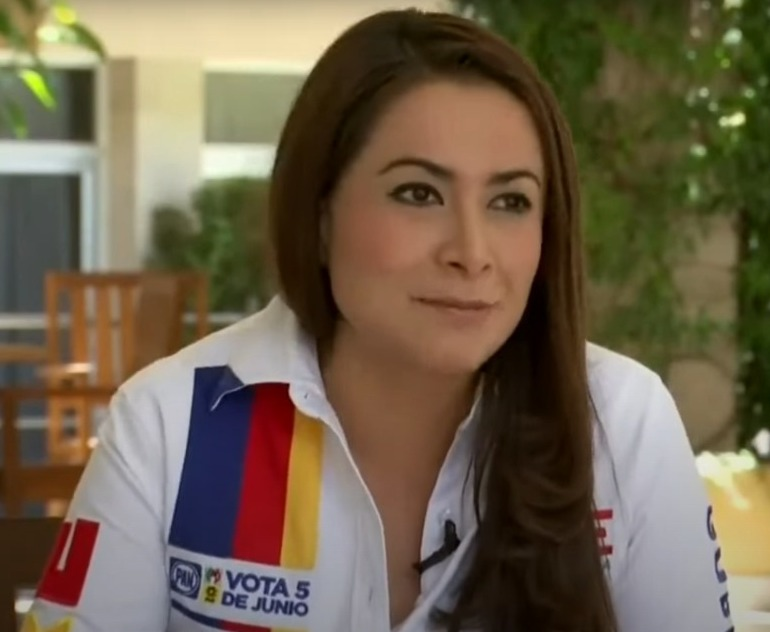
- Incumbent; María Teresa Jiménez Esquivel since October 1, 2022
- Term length: Six years, non-renewable.
- Inaugural holder: Pedro García Rojas
- Formation: 1835

List of governors of the Mexican state of Aguascalientes.

Governor	Term in office	Party	Election	Ref.
Luis Ortega Douglas (1911–1980)	1 December 1956 – 30 November 1962	PRI	1956	
Enrique Olivares Santana (1920–2004)	1 December 1962 – 30 November 1968	PRI	1962	
Francisco Guel Jiménez (1915–2010)	1 December 1968 – 30 November 1974	PRI	1968	
José Refugio Esparza Reyes (1921–2015)	1 December 1974 – 30 November 1980	PRI	1974	
Rodolfo Landeros Gallegos (1931–2001)	1 December 1980 – 30 November 1986	PRI	1980	
Miguel Ángel Barberena Vega (1928–1999)	1 December 1986 – 30 November 1992	PRI	1986	
Otto Granados Roldán (b. 1956)	1 December 1992 – 30 November 1998	PRI	1992	
Felipe González González (1947–2023)	1 December 1998 – 25 August 2004	PAN	1998	
Juan José León Rubio (b. 1954)	25 August 2004 – 30 November 2004	PAN	—	
Luis Armando Reynoso (b. 1957)	1 December 2004 – 30 November 2010	PAN	2004	
Carlos Lozano de la Torre (b. 1950)	1 December 2010 – 30 November 2016	PRI	2010	
Martín Orozco Sandoval (b. 1967)	1 December 2016 – 30 September 2022	PAN	2016	
Tere Jiménez (b. 1984)	1 October 2022 – Incumbent	PAN	2022	

Image	Name	Party	Term
	Benito Palomino Dena	PRI	1953–1956
	Edmundo Gámez Orozco	PRI	1950–1953
	Jesús Maria Rodríguez Flores	PRI	1944–1950
	Alberto del Valle	PRI	1940–1944
	Juan G. Alvarado Lavallade	PRI	1936–1940
	Enrique Osorio Camarena	PRI	1932–1936
	Rafael Quevedo Morán	PRI	1930–1932
	Manuel Carpio Velázquez	PRI	1928–1929
	Benjamín de la Mora	–	1928
	Alberto Díaz de León Bocanegra	–	1928
	Isaac Díaz de León	–	1926–1928
	Manuel Mena	–	1927
	Joaquín de Lara Esqueda	–	1927
	Alberto González Hermosillo Barragán	–	1926–1927
	Francisco Reyes Barrientos	–	1926
	Benjamín Azpeitia Puga	–	1925–1926
	Guadalupe Dávila Guerrero	–	1925
	José Maria Elizalde	–	1924–1925
	Victorino Medina	–	1924
	Rafael Arellano Valle	–	1920–1924
	Aurelio L. González	–	1917–1920
	Antonio Norzagaray	–	1917
	Alberto Fuentes Dávila	–	1911–1913
	Alejandro Vázquez del Mercado	–	1887–1907
	Carlos Sagredo	–	1899–1903
	Rafael Arellano Ruíz Esparza	–	1881–1889
	Miguel Güinchard	–	1879–1881
	Francisco Gómez Hornedo	–	1876–1879
	Rodrigo Rincón Gallardo	–	1875–1876
	Ignacio T. Chávez	–	1872–1875
	Carlos Barrón Letechipía	–	1871–1872
	Jesús Gómez Portugal	–	1867–1871
	José María Chávez Alonso	–	1862–1863
	Esteban Ávila Mier	–	1860–1862
	Jesús Terán Peredo	–	1855–1857
	José Cirilo Gómez Anaya	–	1853–1855
	Felipe Cosio	–	1846–1848
	Felipe Nieto y del Portillo	–	1845–1846
	Mariano Chico Navarro	–	1843–1844
	Pedro García Rojas	–	1835–1836
