= Héctor Hugo Olivares Ventura =

Mexican politician

Member of the Chamber of Deputies for the 2nd Circumscription
- In office 1 September 2006 – 31 August 2009
- Constituency: Aguascalientes

Member of the Chamber of Deputies for Aguascalientes's 2nd district
- In office 1 September 1994 – 31 August 1997
- Preceded by: Javier Rangel Hernández
- Succeeded by: Benjamín Gallegos Soto
- In office 1 September 1982 – 31 August 1985
- Preceded by: Gilberto Romo Nájera
- Succeeded by: Miguel Ángel Barberena Vega

Senator for Aguascalientes
- In office 1 September 1988 – 31 August 1994
- In office 1 September 1976 – 31 August 1982

Personal details
- Born: 24 May 1944 (age 81) Pabellón de Arteaga, Aguascalientes, Mexico
- Party: PRI
- Parent(s): Enrique Olivares Santana; Belén Ventura Rodríguez
- Occupation: Politician

Héctor Hugo Olivares Ventura (born May 24, 1944) is a Mexican politician from the Institutional Revolutionary Party. He has served as Deputy of the LII, LVI and LX Legislatures of the Mexican Congress and as Senator of the L, LI, LIV and LV Legislatures representing Aguascalientes.

He was the President of the Chamber of Deputies in 1996.
