= Arlette Ivette Muñoz Cervantes =

Mexican politician

Member of the Chamber of Deputies for Aguascalientes's 2nd district
- In office 1 September 2015 – 31 August 2018
- Preceded by: María Teresa Jiménez Esquivel
- Succeeded by: Elba Lorena Torres Díaz

Personal details
- Born: 16 September 1983 (age 42) Aguascalientes, Mexico
- Party: PAN
- Occupation: Deputy

Arlette Ivette Muñoz Cervantes (born 16 September 1983) is a Mexican politician affiliated with the National Action Party (PAN). In 2015–2018 she served as a federal deputy in the 63rd Congress, representing the second district of Aguascalientes.
