= Rafael Quevedo Flores =

Peruvian politician

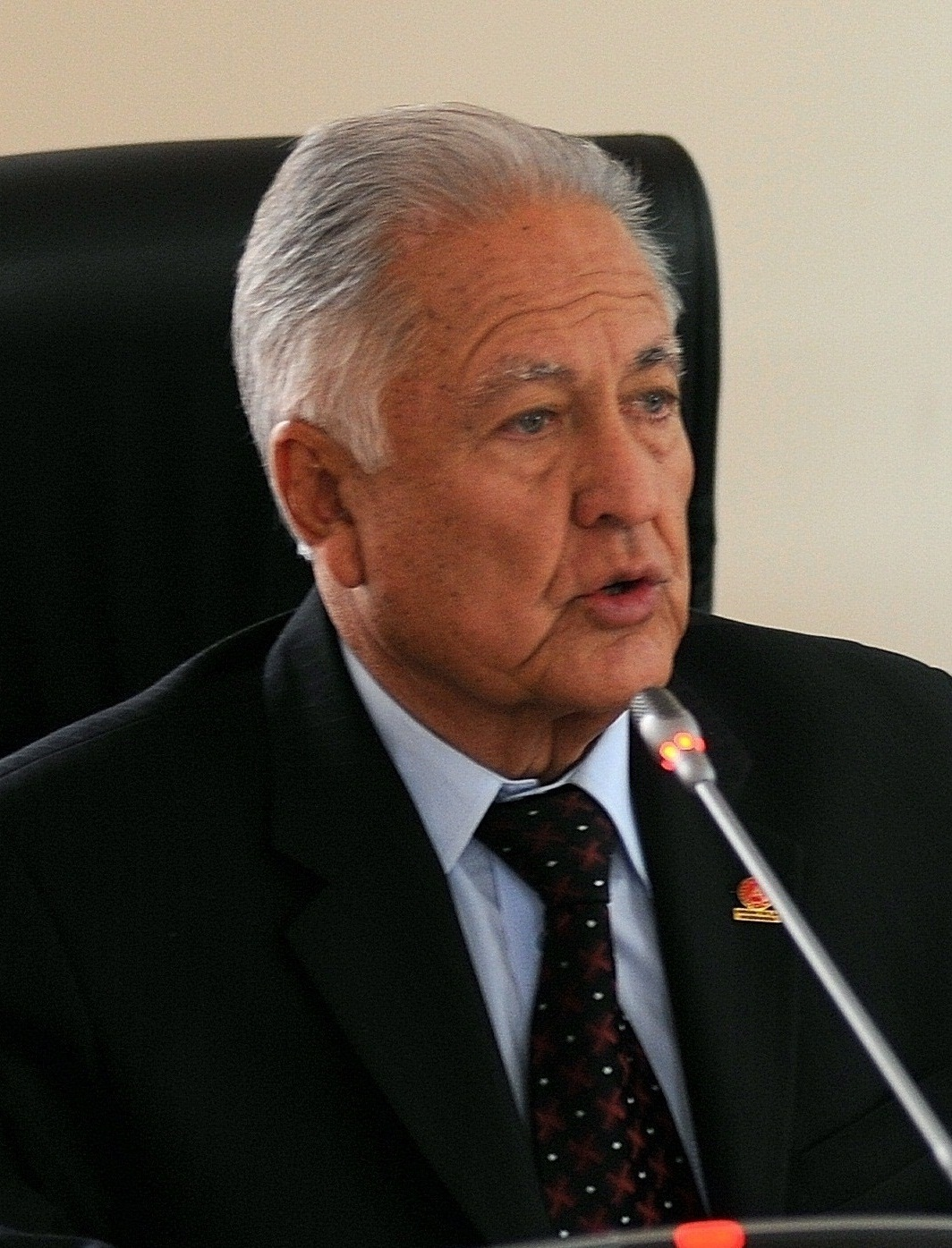
Rafael Quevedo Flores

Rafael Quevedo Flores (1936 – 31 May 2024) was the Peruvian minister of agriculture under President Alan García from September 2010 to May 2011.

He died on 31 May 2024.
