= César Augusto Verástegui Ostos =

Mexican politician (born 1966)

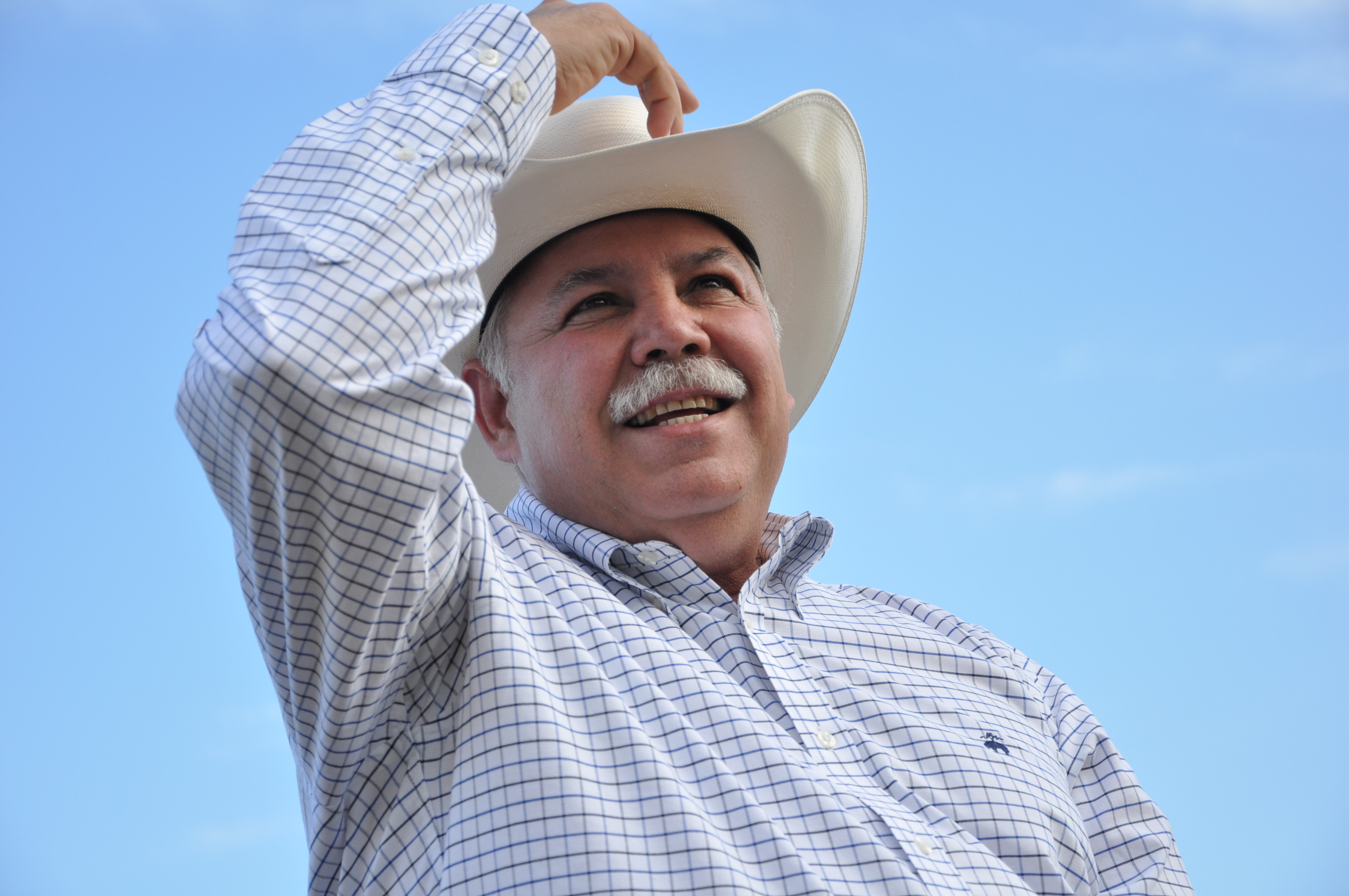
- Verástegui Ostos in 2021
- Born: 14 September 1966 (age 59); Xicoténcatl, Tamaulipas, Mexico
- Occupation: Politician
- Political party: PAN

César Augusto Verástegui Ostos (born 14 September 1966) is a Mexican politician from the National Action Party (PAN).

From 2006 to 2009 he served as a plurinominal deputy during the 60th Congress, representing the fourth electoral region. In the 2024 general election he returned to Congress as one of the second region's plurinominal deputies.

He has also served two terms (2000–2004 and 2011–2015) as the municipal president of his home town, Xicoténcatl, Tamaulipas. During the governorship of Francisco García Cabeza de Vaca (2016–2022) he was appointed to serve as Tamaulipas's secretary of government.
