= Lorena Martínez Rodríguez =

Mexican politician

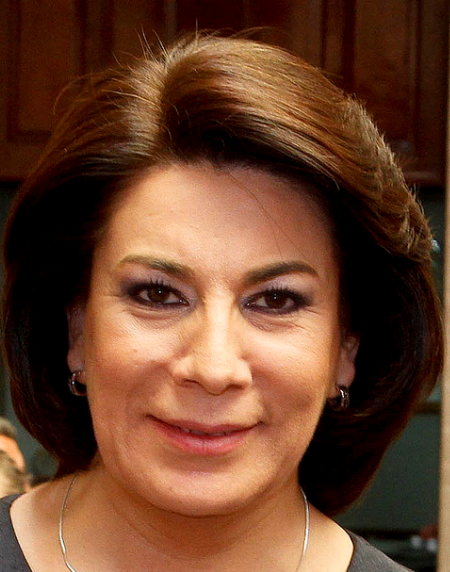
- Born: 2 September 1964 (age 61); Zacatecas, Zacatecas, Mexico
- Occupation: Politician
- Political party: PRI

Lorena Martínez Rodríguez (born 2 September 1964) is a Mexican politician from the Institutional Revolutionary Party. She has served as Deputy of the LVIII and LX Legislatures of the Mexican Congress representing Aguascalientes.

== See also ==
- List of mayors of Aguascalientes
