= Carlos Lozano de la Torre =

Mexican politician

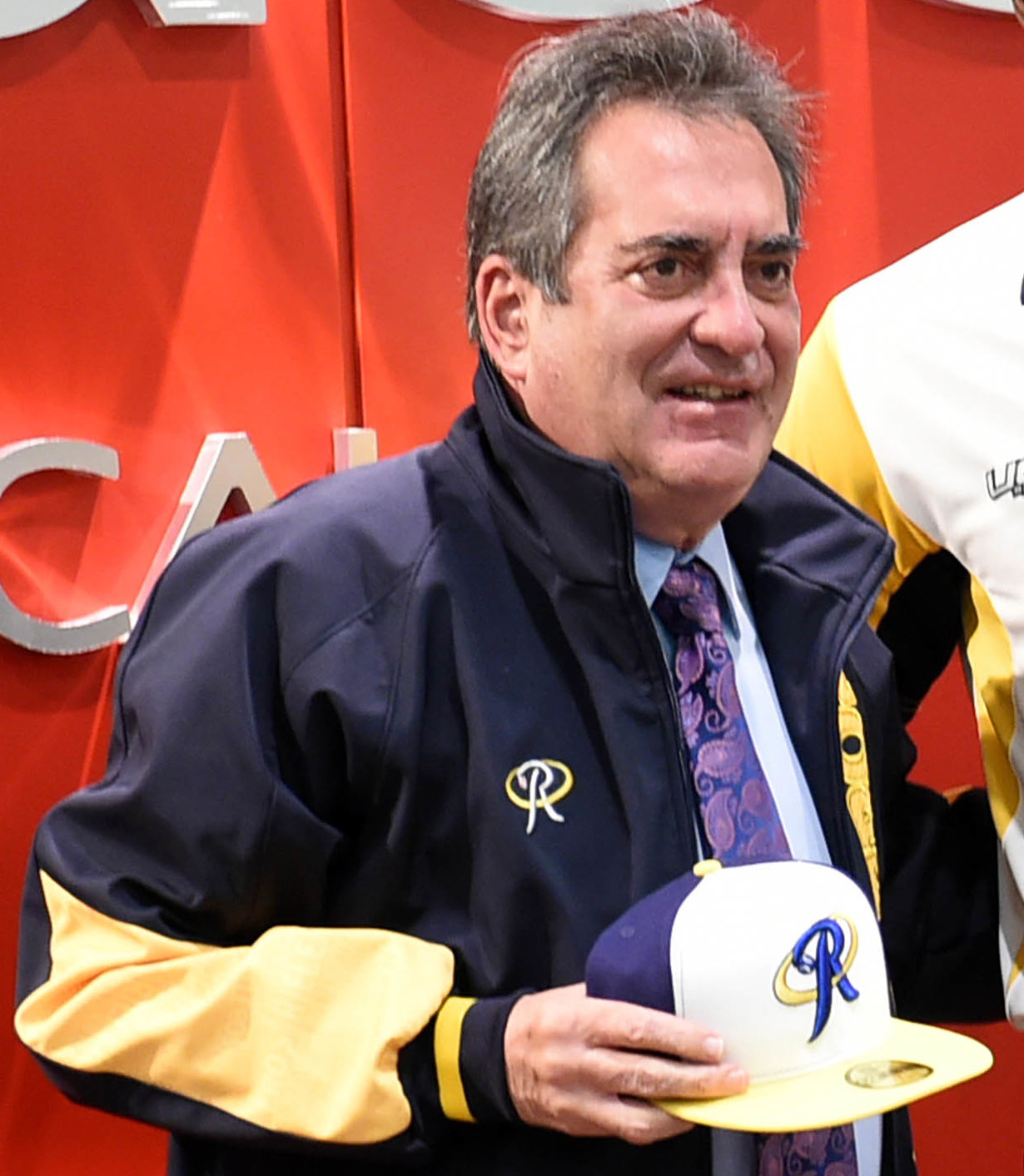
- Lozano de la Torre in 2016

Governor of Aguascalientes
- In office 1 December 2010 – 30 November 2016
- Preceded by: Luis Armando Reynoso
- Succeeded by: Martín Orozco Sandoval

Senator of the Congress of the Union for Aguascalientes
- In office 1 September 2006 – 19 January 2010
- Preceded by: Fernando Gómez Esparza
- Succeeded by: Norma Esparza Herrera

Personal details
- Born: 9 February 1950 (age 76)
- Party: Institutional Revolutionary Party
- Spouse: Blanca Rivera Río Lozano
- Profession: Industrial engineer

Carlos Lozano de la Torre (born February 9, 1950) is a Mexican politician and a member of the Institutional Revolutionary Party (PRI). He was elected Governor of Aguascalientes on July 4, 2010. Lozano was sworn into office on December 1, 2010.

Political offices
Preceded by Luis Armando Reynoso	Governor of Aguascalientes; 2010 — 2016	Succeeded by Martín Orozco Sandoval
