= Congress of Aguascalientes =

State Congress in Mexico

Coordinates: 21.881468°N 102.296304°W

Congress of the State of Aguascalientes
- LXV Legislature

Type
- Type: Unicameral

History
- Founded: 1846 (recognized in 1857)

Leadership
- President: Luis Guadalupe, PAN since 3 March 2025

Structure
- Seats: 27
- Political groups: Government (18): PAN (13); PRD (4); PRI (1); Opposition (9): MORENA (7); PVEM (1); MC (1)
- Authority: Title IV, Chapter I of the Political Constitution of the State of Aguascalientes

Elections
- Voting system: 18 by relative majority, 9 by proportional representation
- Last election: 2 June 2024

Meeting place
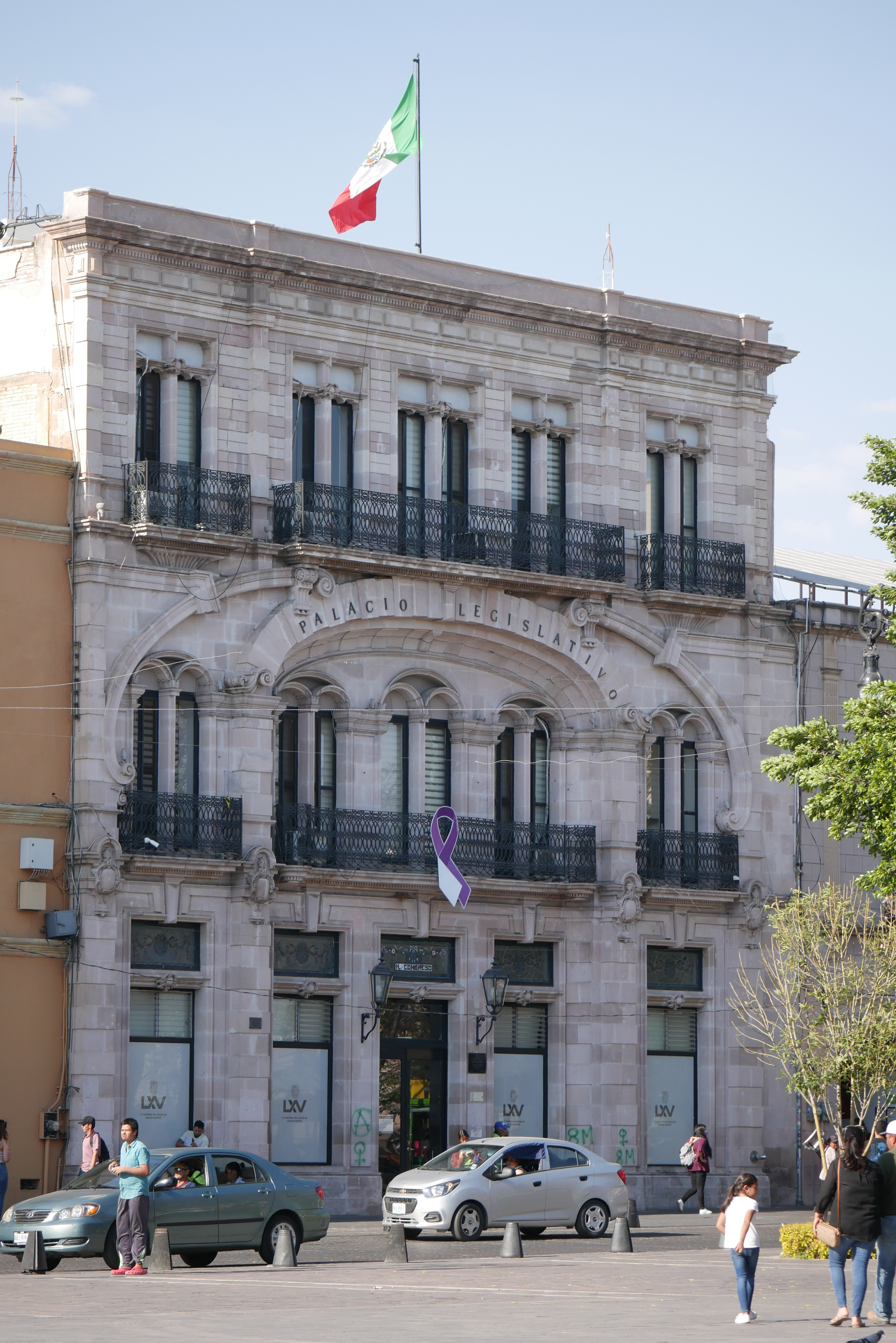
- Palace of the Legislative Power of Aguascalientes, Aguascalientes, Aguascalientes, Mexico

Website
- congresoags.gob.mx

The Congress of Aguascalientes (Spanish: Congreso de Aguascalientes) or by its full name Congress of the Free and Sovereign State of Aguascalientes (Congreso del Estado Libre y Soberano de Aguascalientes) is the depository body of the legislative power of the Mexican state of Aguascalientes, It is a unicameral assembly made up of twenty-seven deputies, of whom eighteen are elected by relative majority and nine by proportional representation.

== Historical composition ==
This chart shows the historical composition of the Congress of Aguascalientes from the LV Legislature to the present. It reflects the party affiliations of deputies at the time of their election and does not account for subsequent party switching.

Congress of Aguascalientes, 1992 to present

PAN / PRI / PPS / PARM / PFCRN / PRD / PT / PVEM / MC / PANAL / MORENA / PES			Total
LV	1992	1 / 1 / 1 / 1 / 20 / 1	25
LVI	1995	1 / 1 / 1 / 11 / 13	27
LVII	1998	1 / 10 / 16	27
LVIII	2001	2 / 1 / 12 / 2 / 10	27
LIX	2004	1 / 1 / 1 / 4 / 2 / 18	27
LX	2007	1 / 2 / 14 / 1 / 9	27
LXI	2010	1 / 1 / 1 / 4 / 14 / 2 / 4	27
LXII	2013	1 / 2 / 1 / 2 / 12 / 2 / 7	27
LXIII	2016	1 / 1 / 3 / 6 / 2 / 13 / 1	27
LXIV	2018	2 / 5 / 1 / 3 / 1 / 14 / 1	27
LXV	2021	1 / 6 / 4 / 1 / 1 / 1 / 13	27
LXVI	2024	7 / 4 / 1 / 1 / 1 / 13	27
