= Autonomous University of Aguascalientes =

University in Mexico

- Universidad Autónoma de Aguascalientes
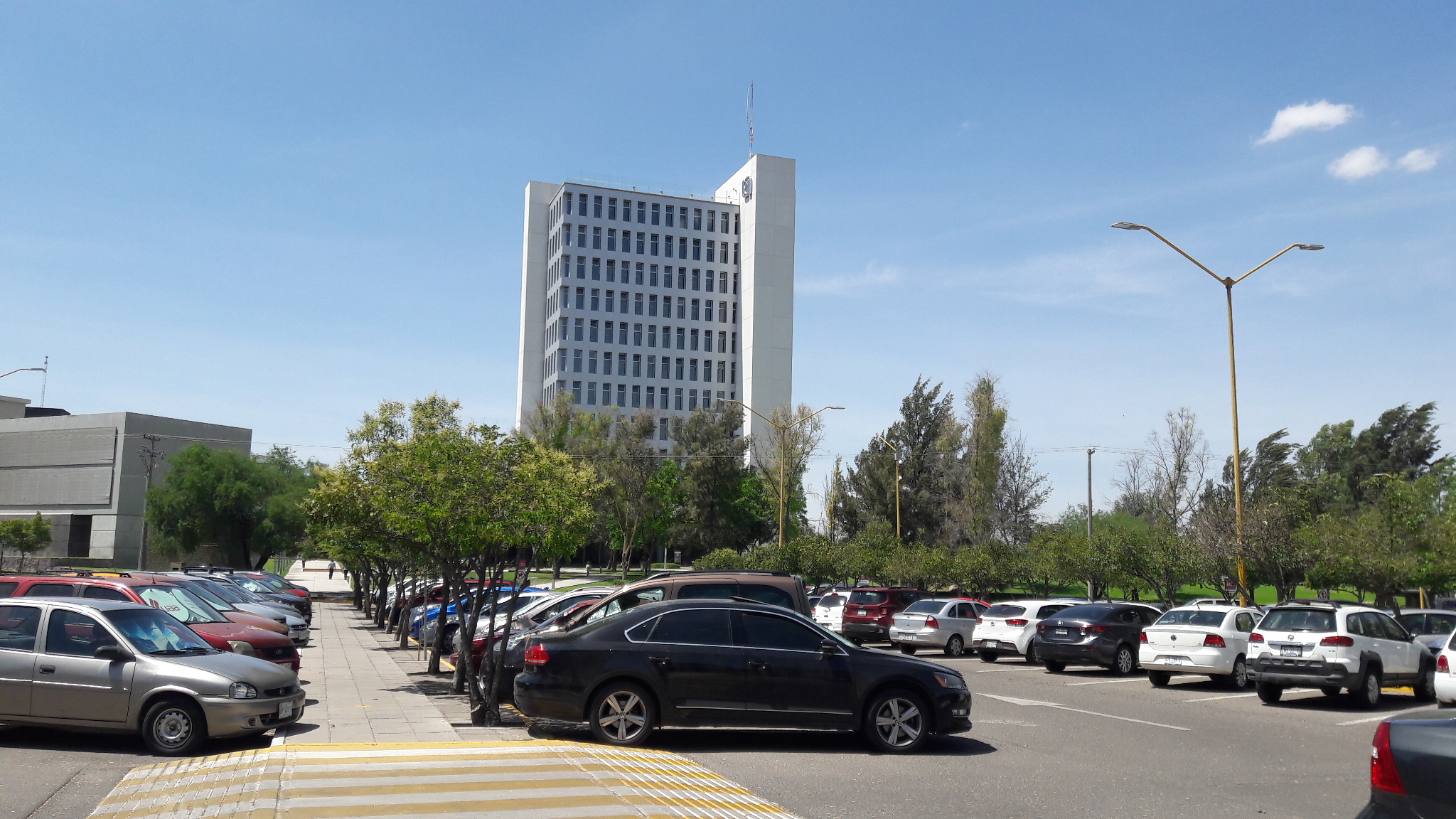
- Former names: Instituto Autónomo de Ciencias y Tecnología (Autonomous Institute of Science and Technology, 1968)
- Motto: Latin: Se lumen proferre (To project oneself into light)
- Type: Public university
- Established: 19 June 1973
- Founder: C.P. Humberto Martínez de León
- Affiliations: APRU, IFPU, ANUIES, FIMPES, CUMEX and CONAPRED.
- Rector: Sandra Yesenia Pinzón Castro
- Location: Aguascalientes, Aguascalientes, Mexico; 21°54′48.17″N 102°18′54.09″W
- Campus: Urban
- Colors: PANTONE 137 C PANTONE 206 C PANTONE 2757 C PANTONE 537 C
- Mascot: Gallos (Roosters)
- Website: www.uaa.mx
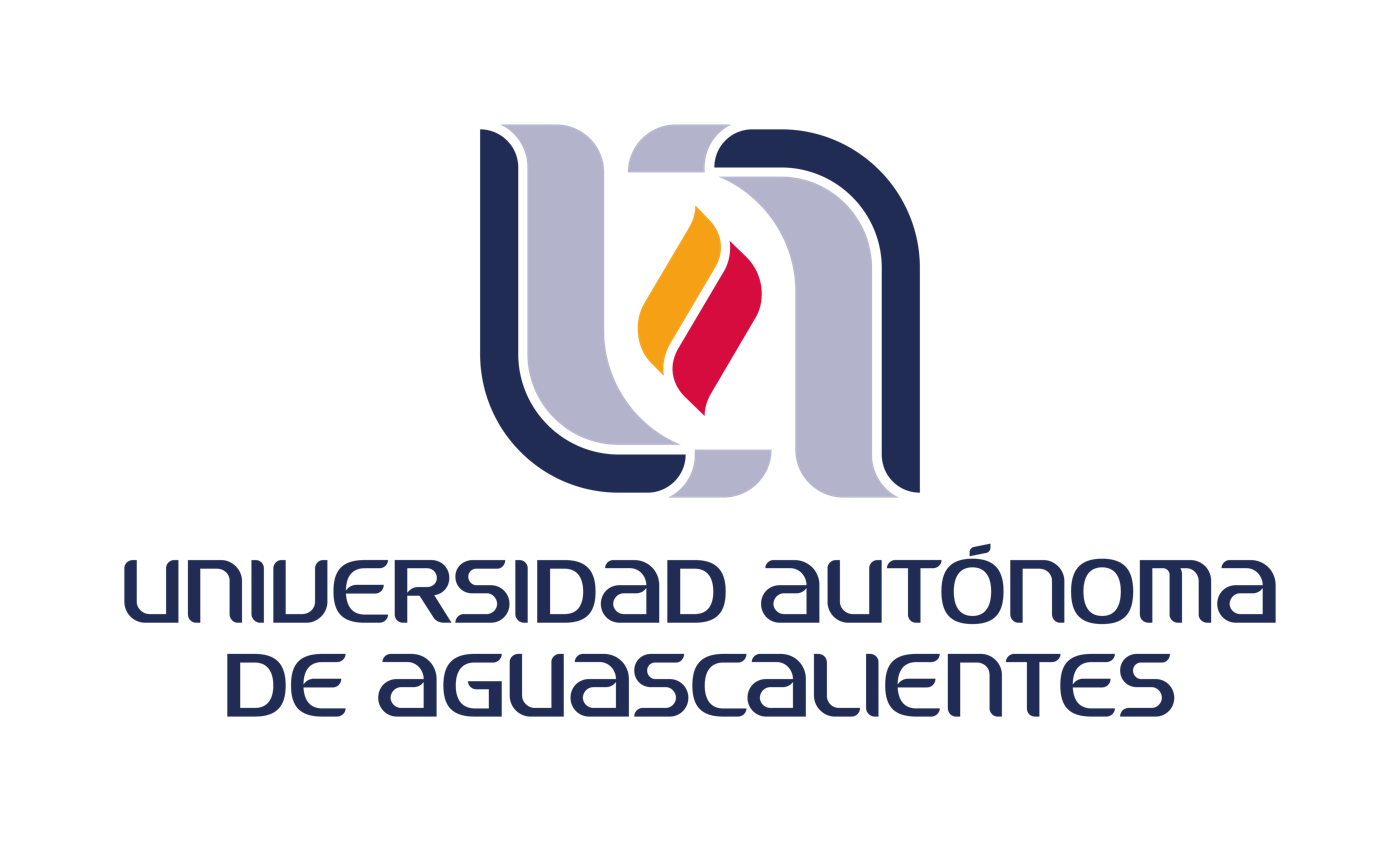

The Autonomous University of Aguascalientes (in Spanish: Universidad Autónoma de Aguascalientes, UAA) is a Mexican public university based in the city of Aguascalientes, Mexico.

The Autonomous University of Aguascalientes has several campuses that are located across the state. The university was founded on June 19, 1973, its preceding institution, The School of Agriculture (in Spanish: Escuela de Agricultura), was founded on January 15, 1867. The Autonomous University of Aguascalientes currently offers 64 different bachelor's degrees, 15 master's degrees and 9 doctoral degrees.

Its library is named after poet and university president Desiderio Macías Silva, and holds over 183,063 volumes.

The UAA also operates a radio station, XHUAA-FM 94.5, and a television station (UAA TV) available on cable providers in the city.

== Digital television ==
XHCGA-TDT is authorized to broadcast a television service known as "AGS TV" on digital subchannel 26.2. In actuality, this station is UAA TV, the television service of the Universidad Autónoma de Aguascalientes, which began broadcasting over XHCGA-TDT on August 7, 2017.

== Gallery ==
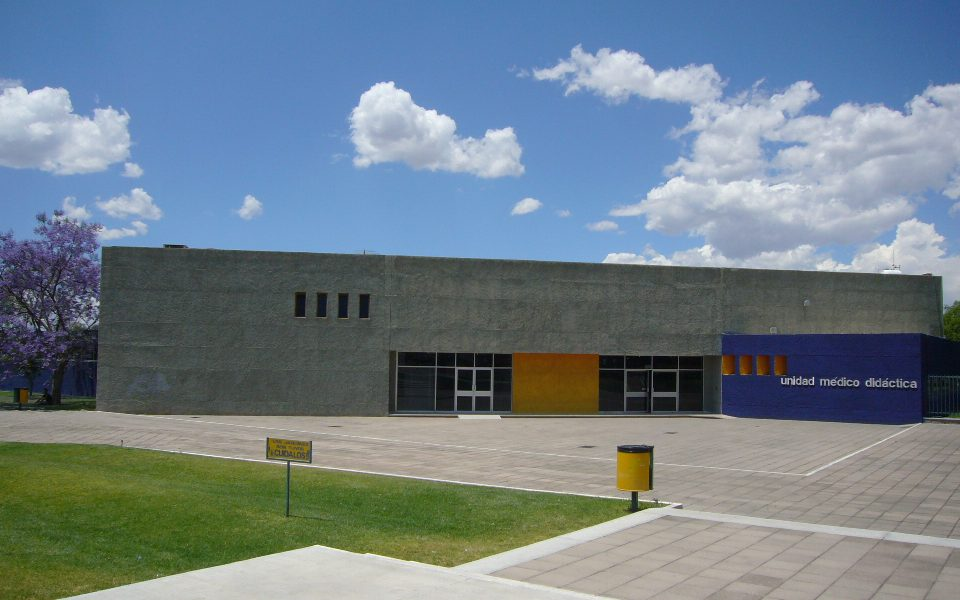
The university hospital.

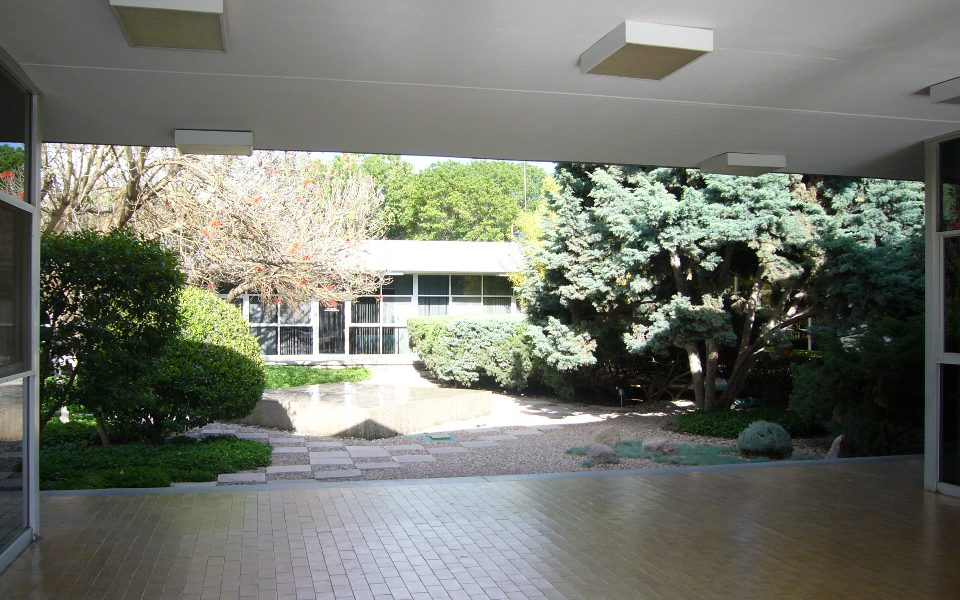
University Rectory.
