= Aguascalientes Municipality =

Municipality in the Mexican state of Aguascalientes

Aguascalientes
- Municipality
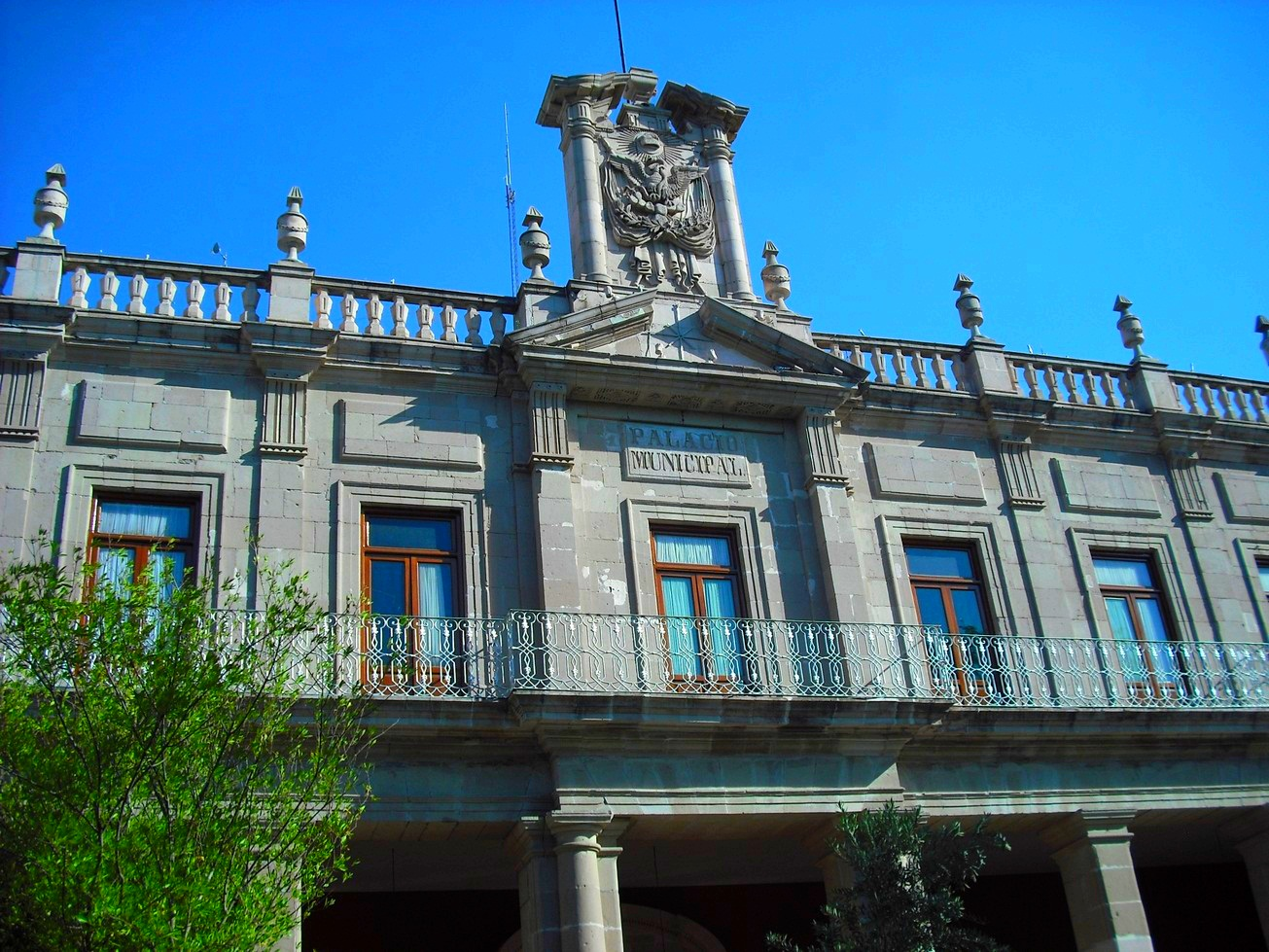
- Aguascalientes City Hall

- Coat of arms
- Motto: Virtus in Aquis, Fidelitas in Pectoribus
- Location of Aguascalientes in Aguascalientes.
- Coordinates: 21°53′N 102°18′W
- Country: Mexico
- State: Aguascalientes
- Municipal seat: Aguascalientes
- Largest city: Aguascalientes

Government
  - Mayor: Leonardo Montañez Castro (PAN)
  - Federal electoral district: Aguascalientes's 2nd and 3rd

Area
  - Total: 1,178.85 km^{2} (455.16 sq mi)

Population (2010)
  - Total: 797,010
  - Density: 676.09/km^{2} (1,751.1/sq mi)
- Data source: INEGI
- Time zone: UTC–06:00 (Zona Centro)
- INEGI code: 001
- Website: (in Spanish) Municipio Virtual de Aguascalientes

Aguascalientes is a municipality in the Mexican state of Aguascalientes. Its municipal seat is the city of Aguascalientes, which is also the state capital. As of 2010, its population was 797,010, most of whom lived in the city of Aguascalientes.

== Geography ==
Aguascalientes is in the south of the valley that divides the state in two and borders the municipalities of El Llano, Jesús María, Calvillo, Asientos, and San Francisco de los Romo in the state, as well as the state of Jalisco to the south. Its area is 1,169 km^{2}.

== Demographics ==
As of 2010, the municipality had a total population of 797,010.

As of 2010, the city of Aguascalientes had a population of 722,250. Other than the city of Aguascalientes, the municipality had 799 localities, the largest of which (with 2010 populations in parentheses) were: Pocitos (5,169), Villa Licenciado Jesús Terán (Calvillito) (4,481), Norias de Ojocaliente (3,741), Norias del Paso Hondo (2,539), General José María Morelos y Pavón (Cañada Honda) (2,500), classified as urban, and Cartagena (2,496), Jaltomate (2,299), San Antonio de Peñuelas (2,147), San Sebastián (1,862), Peñuelas (El Cienegal) (1,670), El Refugio de Peñuelas (1,624), Montoro (Mesa del Salto) (1,574), La Loma de los Negritos (1,519), El Salto de los Salado (1,436), Arellano (1,382), San Ignacio (1,360), Cumbres III (1,337), Cotorina (Coyotes) (1,298), Lomas del Sur (1,207), Los Caños (1,150), and Centro de Arriba (El Taray) (1,064), classified as rural.

== See also ==
- List of municipal presidents of Aguascalientes
