= Timeline of Aguascalientes City =

Coordinates: 21.876°N 102.296°W

The following is a timeline of the history of Aguascalientes City, Mexico.

== Prior to 20th century ==
- 1575 – Aguascalientes founded.
- 1604 – San Marcos Fair begins.
- 1857 – Town becomes capital of Aguascalientes state.
- 1867 – School of Agriculture established.
- 1870 – El Despertador newspaper in publication.
- 1883 – León-Aguascalientes railway established.
- 1885 – Teatro Morelos opens.
- 1899 – Roman Catholic Diocese of Aguascalientes established.

== 20th century ==
- 1903 – State Teaching School built.
- 1911 – Population: 44,800.
- 1964 – Museo de la Insurgencia opens.
- 1972 – Posada Museum opens.
- 1973 – Autonomous University of Aguascalientes established.
- 1975 – Rieleros de Aguascalientes baseball team formed.
- 1982 – Aguascalientes State Historical Archive established.
- 1987 – El Heraldo de Aguascalientes newspaper begins publication.
- 1988 – Museo Regional de Historia de Aguascalientes established.
- 1989 – Jardín Botánico Rey Netzahualcoyotl (garden) active.
- 1991 – Teatro Aguascalientes opens.
- 2000 – Population: 594,092.

== 21st century ==
- 2003
  - Estadio Victoria (stadium) opens.
  - Club Necaxa football team active.
- 2010 – Population: 722,250; metro 932,369.
- 2011
  - Lorena Martínez Rodríguez becomes mayor.
  - Línea Verde project begins.
  - Nuestra Belleza Aguascalientes 2011 (beauty pageant) held in city.
- 2013 – New Nissan Motor Company manufactory begins operating.

== See also ==
- Aguascalientes (city) history
- List of municipal presidents of Aguascalientes
- Aguascalientes (state) history

== Bibliography ==
=== In English ===
Published in the 19th century

- Charles W. Zaremba (1883). "State of Aguascalientes". Merchants' and Tourists' Guide to Mexico. Chicago: Althrop Publishing House.
- Henry Moore (1894), "Commercial Directory: Aguascalientes", Railway Guide of the Republic of Mexico, Springfield, Ohio: Huben & Moore, OCLC 22498265
- "Aguas Calientes", Vamos á México, Chicago: Southern Pacific Company, 1896
- Cristobal Hidalgo (1900), "Important Cities: Aguas Calientes", Guide to Mexico, San Francisco, California: Whitaker & Ray Co.

Published in the 20th century

- "Aguas Calientes". Catholic Encyclopedia. New York. 1907.
- Reau Campbell (1909), "Aguas Calientes", Campbell's New Revised Complete Guide and Descriptive Book of Mexico, Chicago: Rogers & Smith Co., OCLC 1667015
- "Aguascalientes" . Encyclopædia Britannica. Vol. 1 (11th ed.). 1911. p. 427.
- W.H. Koebel, ed. (1921), "Mexico: Chief Towns: Aguascalientes", Anglo-South American Handbook, vol. 1, New York: Macmillan, hdl:2027/mdp.39015027978728
- Ernst B. Filsinger (1922), "Mexico: Aguascalientes", Commercial Travelers' Guide to Latin America, Washington, DC: Government Printing Office
- "North Central Highlands: Aguascalientes", Mexico, Lonely Planet, 1998, OL 8314651M (fulltext via OpenLibrary)
- John Fisher (1999), "The Bajio: Aguascalientes", Mexico, Rough Guides (4th ed.), London, p. 231+, OL 24935876M
- "Northeast Mexico: Aguascalientes", Mexico, Let's Go, 1999, p. 267+, ISBN 9780312194901 (fulltext via OpenLibrary)

=== In Spanish ===
- Antonio García Cubas [in Spanish] (1896). "Aguascalientes". Diccionario Geográfico, Histórico y Biográfico de los Estados Unidos Mexicanos (in Spanish). Vol. 1. México: Antigua Imprenta de las Escalerillas. hdl:2027/coo.31924020385047.
- J. Figueroa Doménech (1899). "Estado de Aguascalientes: Aguascalientes". Guía General Descriptiva de la República Mexicana (in Spanish). Vol. 2. R. de S. N. Araluce.
- Jesus Gomez Serrano (2005). "Una ciudad pujante: Aguascalientes durante el porfiriato". In Anne Staples (ed.). Bienes y vivencias, el siglo XIX [Goods and experiences, the nineteenth century]. Historia de la vida cotidiana en México (History of everyday life in Mexico) (in Spanish). El Colegio de México. pp. 253–286. ISBN 978-968-16-7762-6.
