= Temple of Saint Anthony of Padua =

Catholic church in Aguascalientes, Mexico

- El Templo de San Antonio
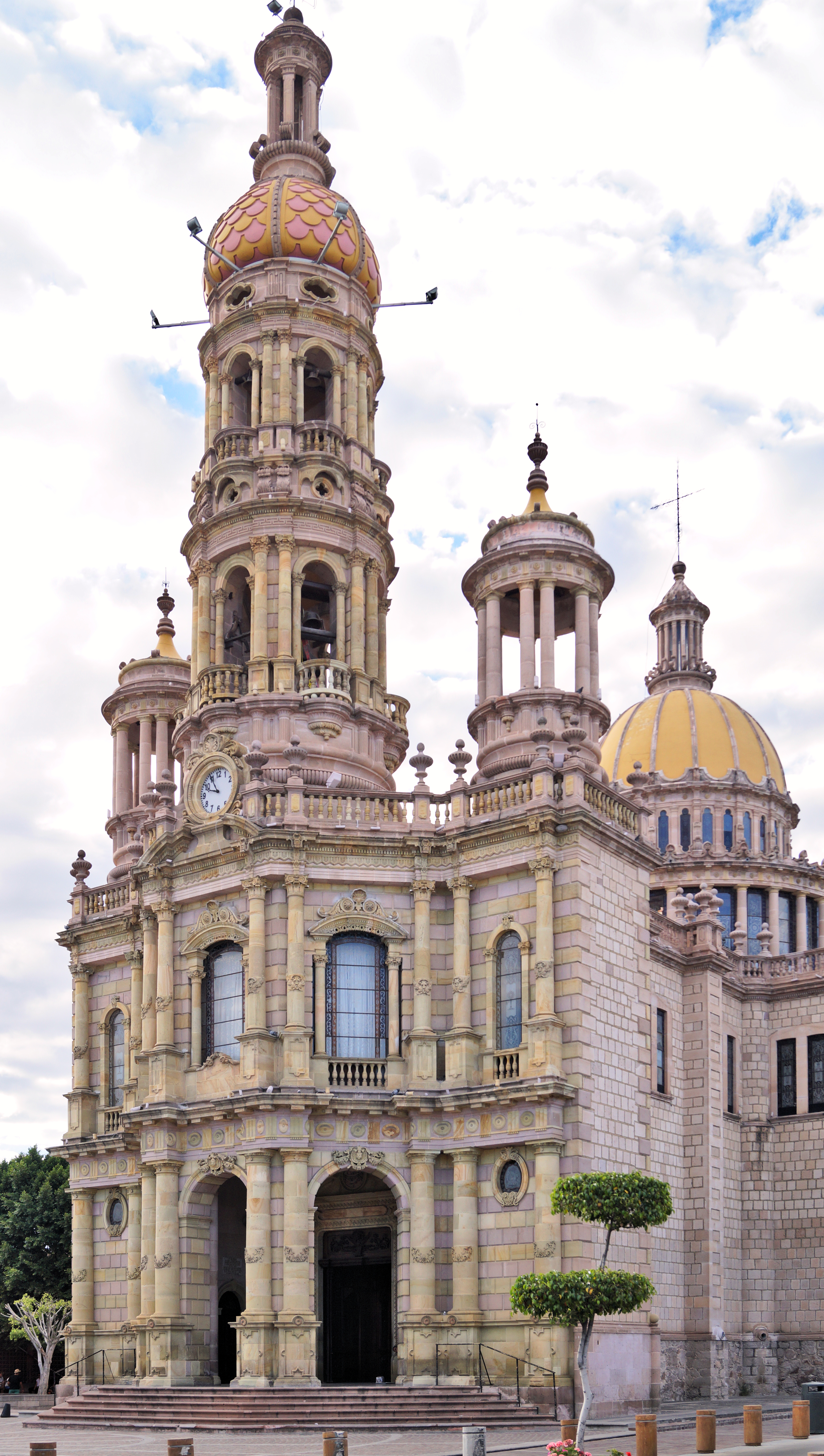

Religion
- Affiliation: Catholic
- Ecclesiastical or organizational status: Order of Saint Augustine
- Patron: Saint Anthony of Padua
- Status: Active

Location
- Location: Aguascalientes City
- State: Aguascalientes
- Country: Mexico
- Interactive map of Temple of Saint Anthony of Padua

Architecture
- Architect: Refugio Reyes Rivas
- Style: Eclectic, Baroque
- Funded by: Order of Saint Francis
- Groundbreaking: 1895
- Completed: 1908
- Direction of façade: South

The Church of Saint Anthony of Padua (Spanish: Templo de San Antonio de Padua) is a Catholic church and monument in downtown Aguascalientes, Mexico, built between 1895 and 1908. The church is widely considered the masterpiece of Refugio Reyes Rivas, a mason who went to become one of the most influential architects in the region. In this work Rivas departed from any specific style, explicitly choosing an eclectic architecture drawing from neoclassical, baroque, Russian and even gothic and Islamic influences. The building was originally commissioned by the Franciscans, but it is currently managed by the Order of Saint Augustine.

== Description ==
The monument is made of yellow limestone extracted from Ciénega Grande, Aguascalientes. It is styled with ornamental columns. The temple's most prominent detail is its dome, located behind the central tower, which is set below another small bulbous dome featuring a cross at the top. Two other circular towers sit slightly behind the front façade. It contains five arched glass windows, each surrounded by columns. Three main arches lead to the central entrance.

== Interior ==
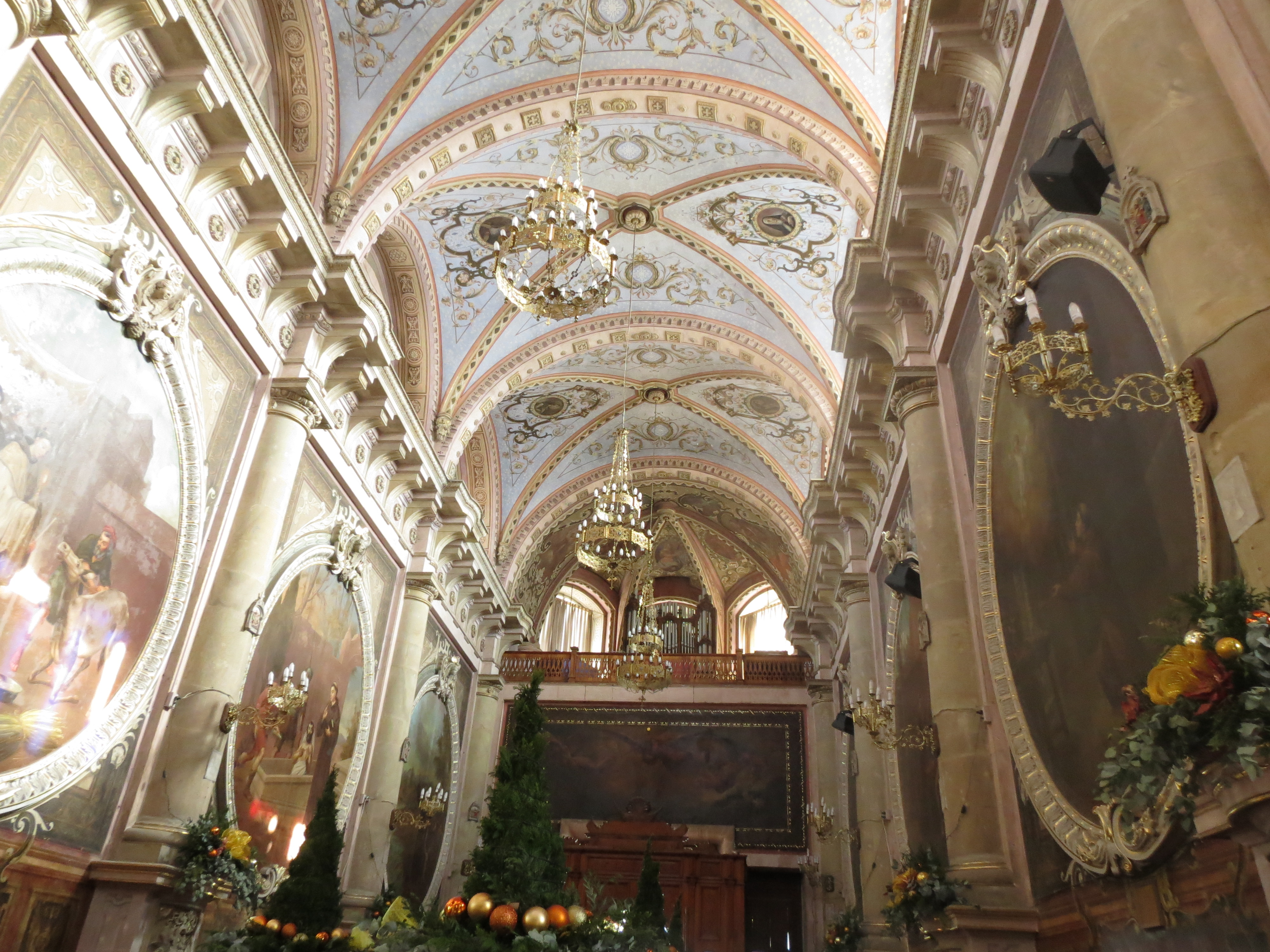
The church's single interior nave.

The dome has a number of pendentives with geometric details and sculpted flowers in its interior. The walls contain several paintings framed by medallion structures made by Candelario Rivas that show miracles attributed to Saint Anthony of Padua.

Chandeliers hang from an arched ceiling, rife with more pendentives just above the capitals of Doric-styled columns. A balcony above the common area contains a pipe organ and a small number of seats, usually reserved for important guests. Below, the common area consists of a main section in front of the altar, and two on the sides.

== Construction ==
The city's population took a special interest in the construction of the temple because its architect, Refugio Reyes Rivas, had no formal architectural training. Construction began in 1895 and was completed in 1908. During construction, Reyes Rivas was often criticized by Camilo E. Pani, an engineer who believed the dome would collapse as soon as the supporting beams were removed. Rivas had to ask his own family to help him remove the beams, out of distrust from workers. The dome was able to withstand its weight and Reyes Rivas was praised for his accomplishments. In recognition of this and his other buildings, the Autonomous University of Aguascalientes awarded Reyes Rivas a posthumous degree in architecture in 1985.
