= Museo Descubre =

Coordinates: 21.856639°N 102.289238°W

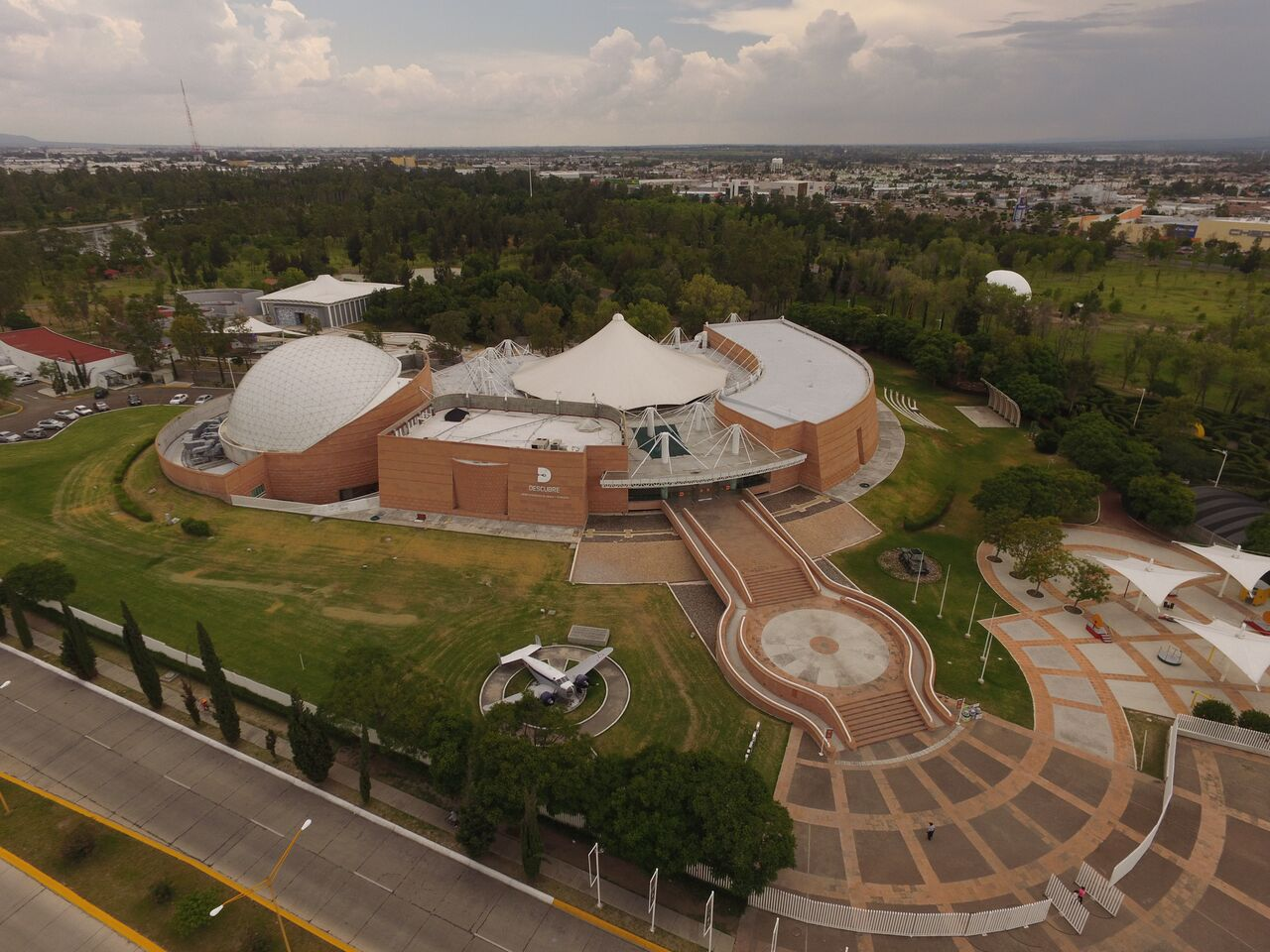
Museo Descubre in Aguascalientes, Mexico

Museo Descubre (Full name: "Descubre, Museo Interactivo de Ciencia y Tecnología" or "Discover Interactive Museum of Science and Technology") is a hands-on, interactive museum located in the city of Aguascalientes City, Aguascalientes, Mexico. Inside, the museum is shaped like a spiral, leading inward to various paths of knowledge. The museum creates a link between fun and learning by allowing visitors to actively participate by touching and playing with exhibits. The museum has exhibits on the sciences of life science, earth science, and social sciences. It also contains an IMAX dome, allowing viewers to view films in full panorama.

It also contains an auditorium, coffee shop and souvenir stores.

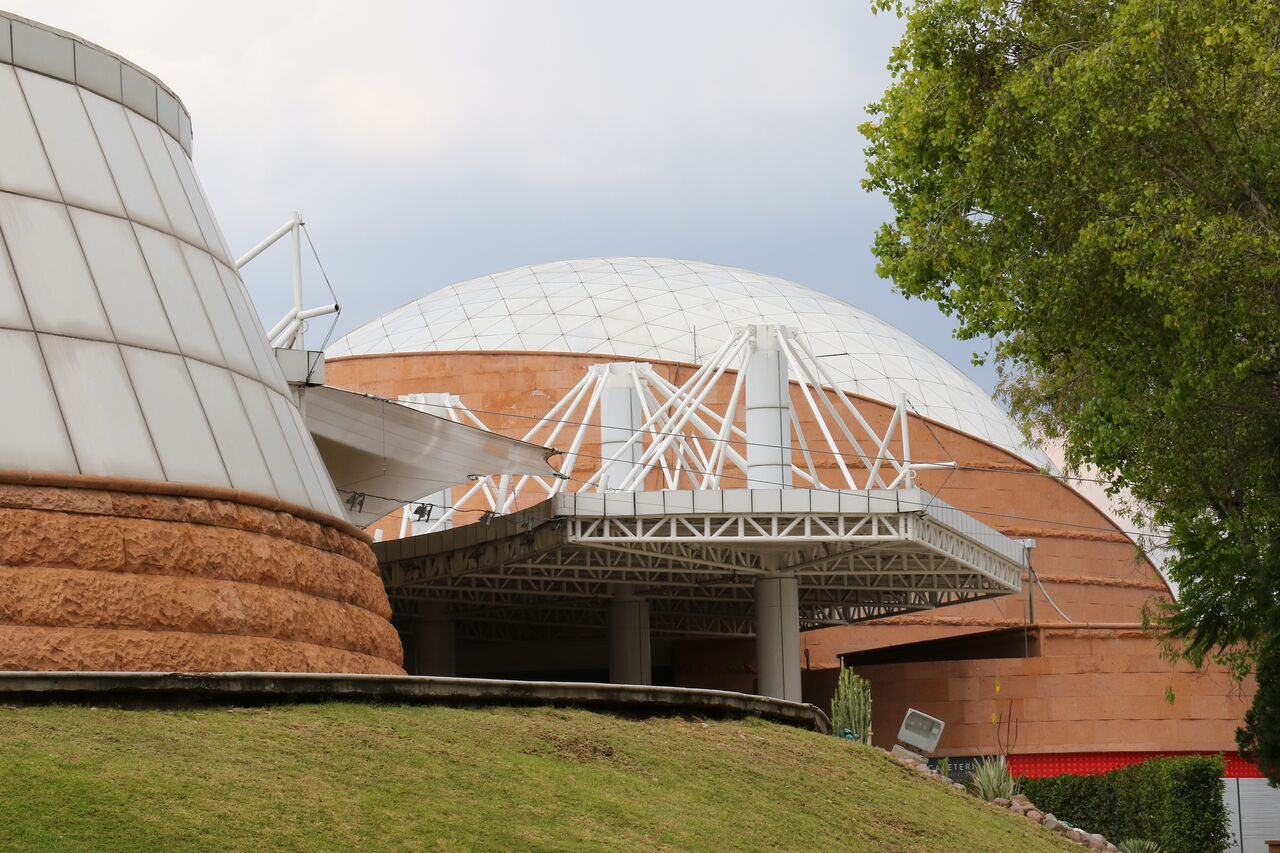

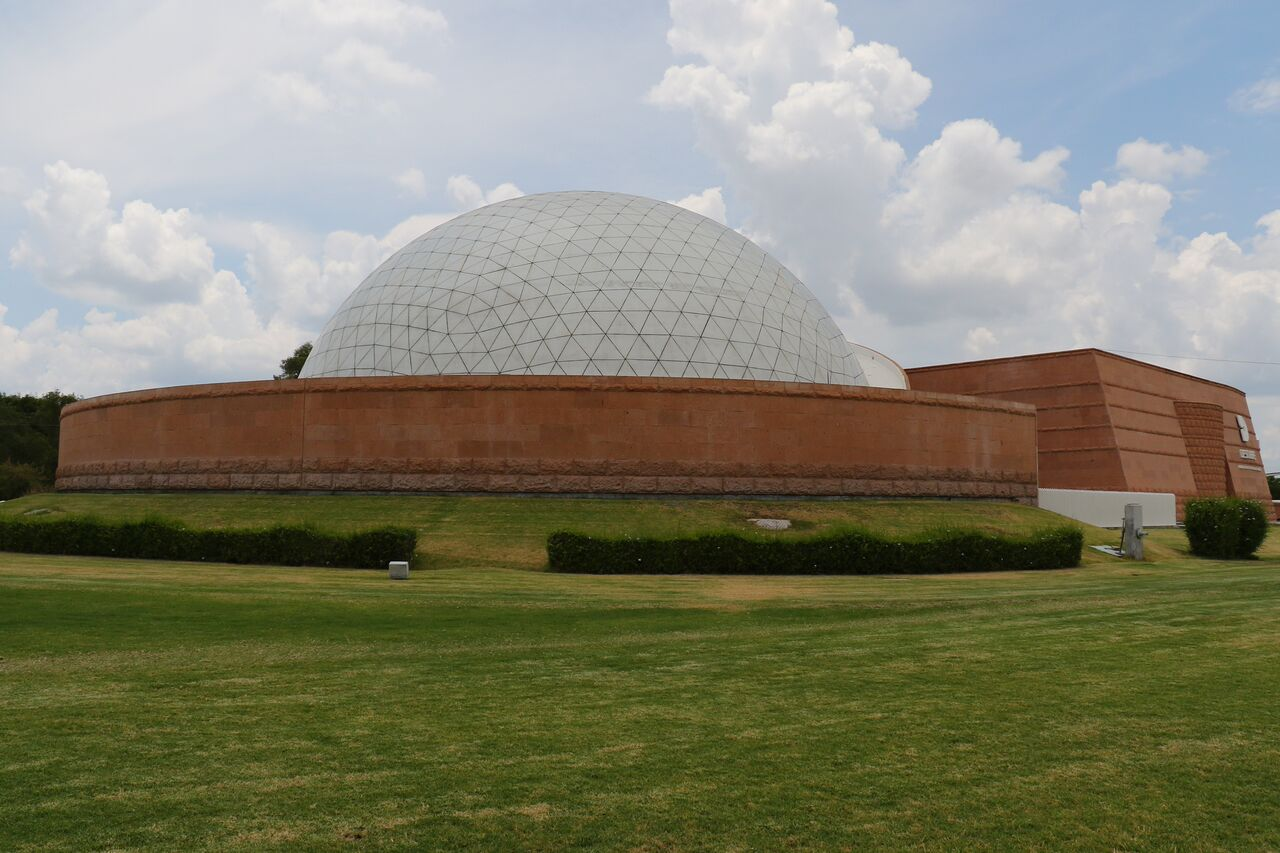

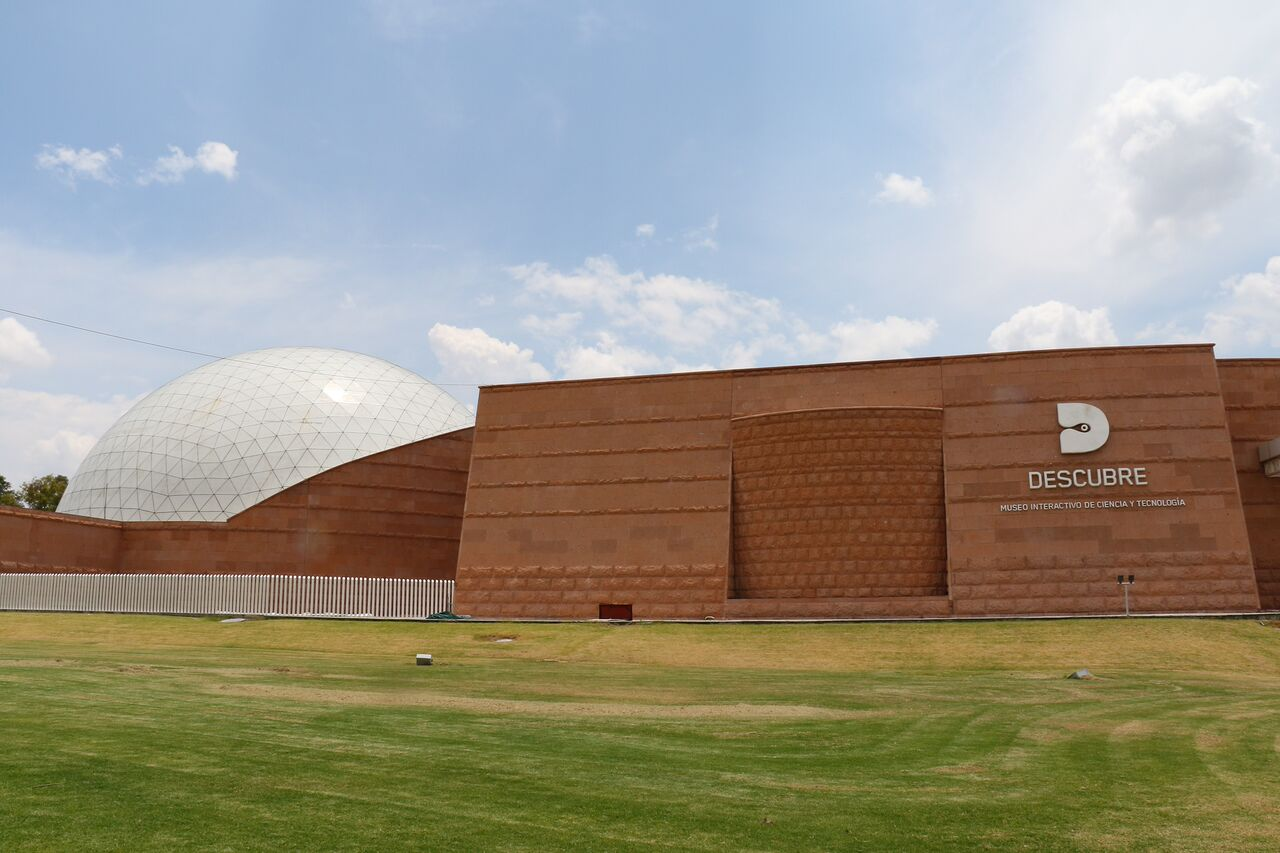

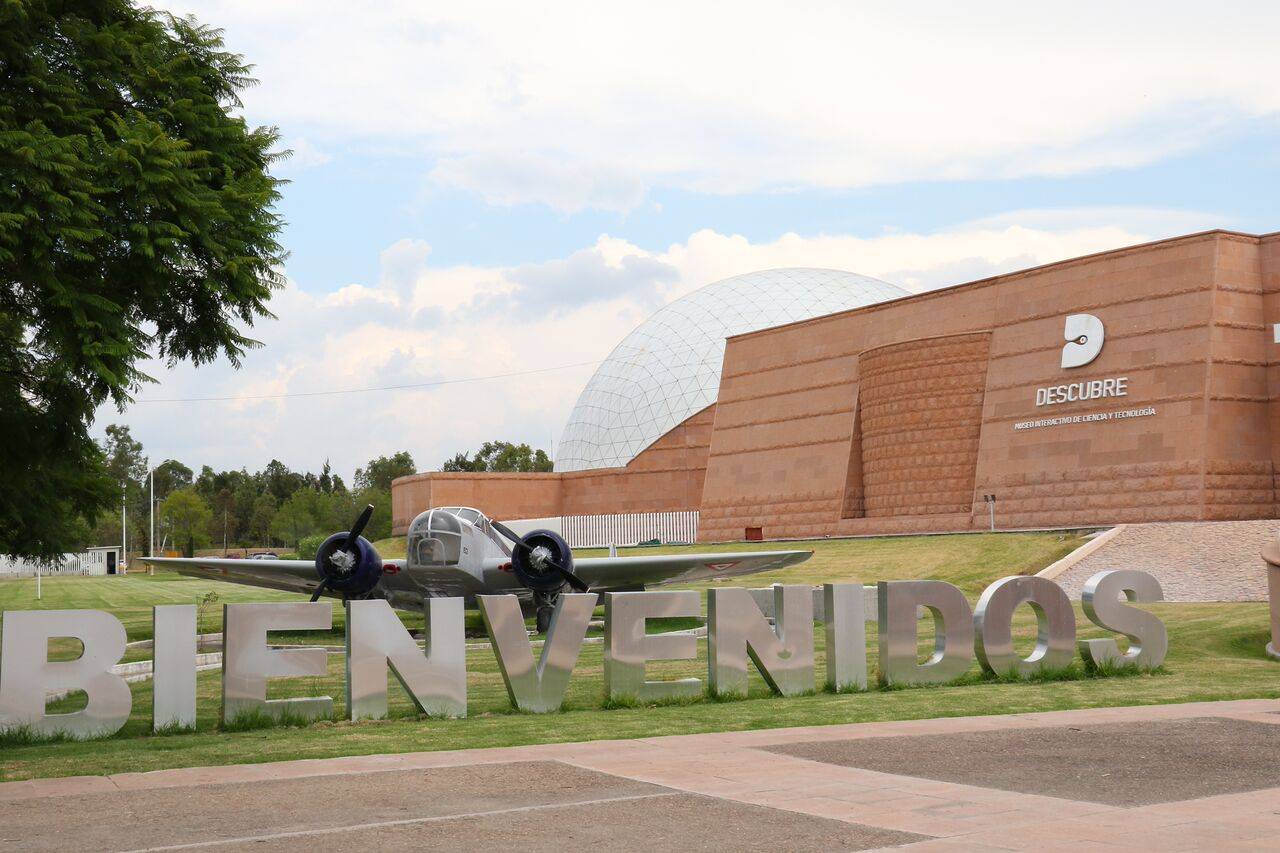

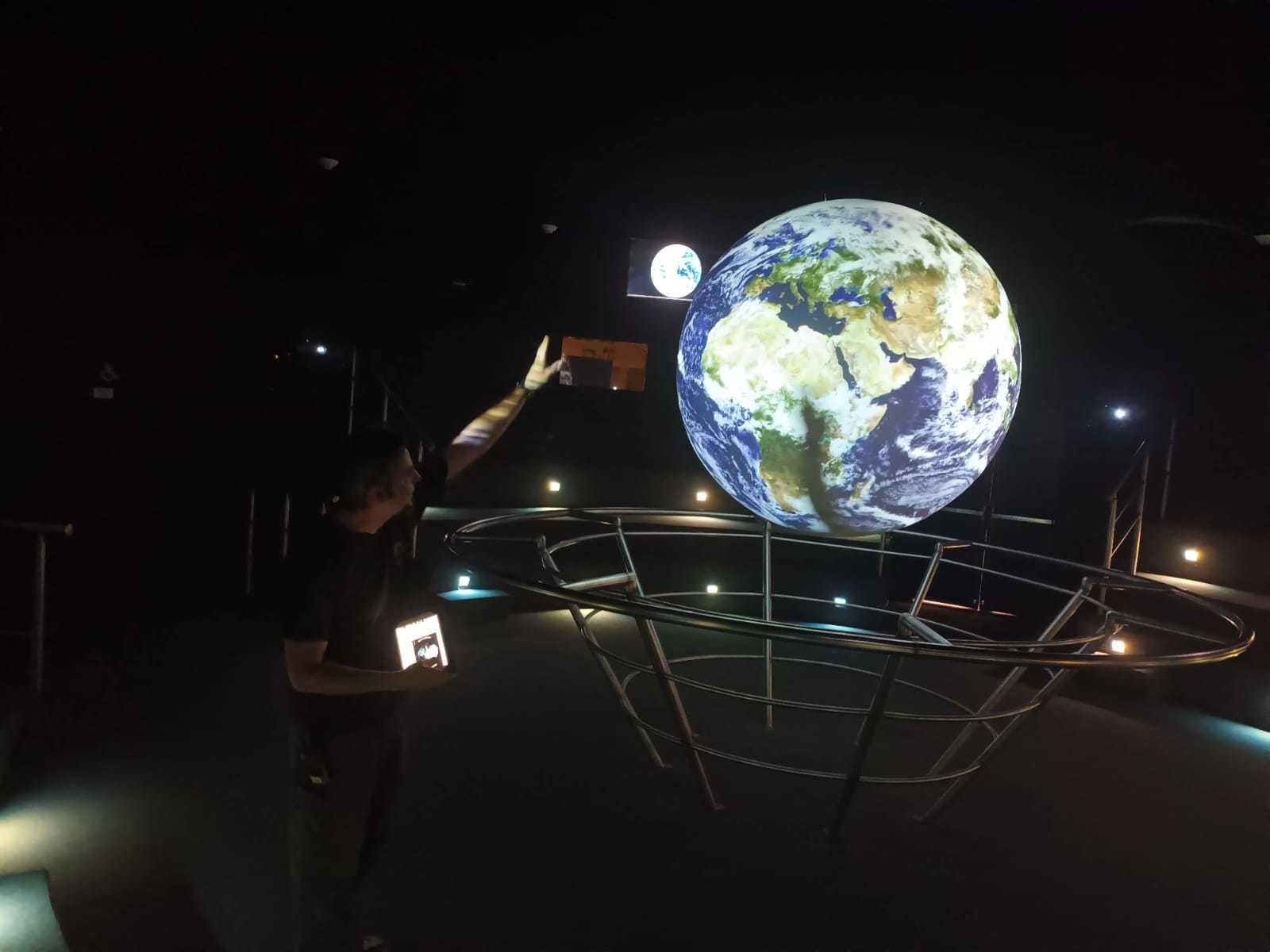
