= La Estacion Theme Park =

Theme park in Aguascalientes, Mexico

Old Train Station and Railway Museum
- Estación de ferrocarriles en Aguascalientes
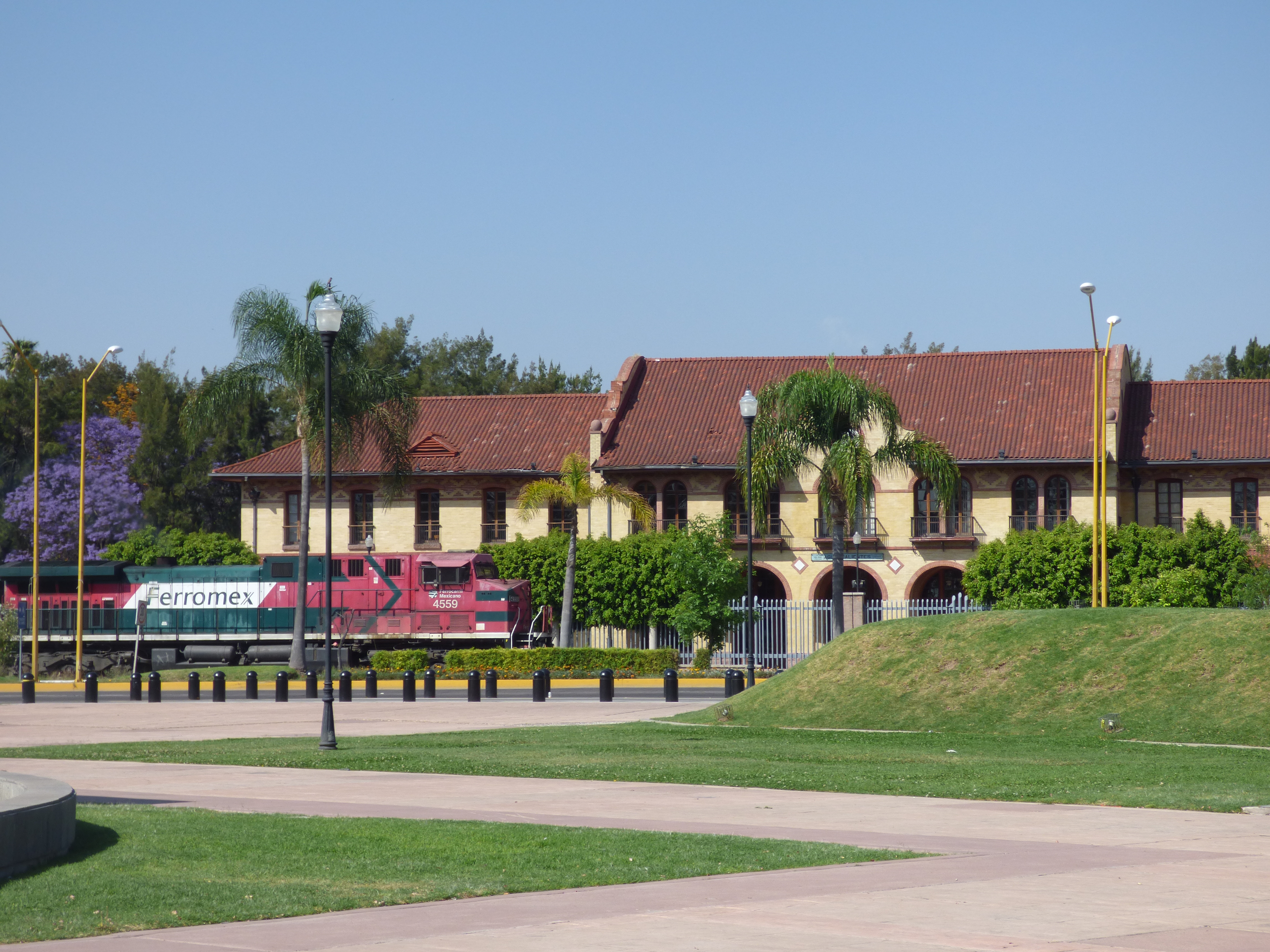
- Established: 1910 (station)
- Location: Aguascalientes, Aguascalientes, Mexico
- Coordinates: 21.885°N 102.281°W
- Website: www.aguascalientes.gob.mx

La Estacion Theme Park (The Railway Station), including The Old Train Station and Railway Museum, is a historic and recreational complex located in the city of Aguascalientes, in the state of Aguascalientes, in Mexico.

The State of Aguascalientes was at some point a major railway hub for Mexico, due to its central location between important cities. It was home to some of the largest workshops and warehouses in Latin America. When the workshops ceased its work, the calderas, machinery and old workshops remained abandoned. They were salvaged by the city council and converted into a museum area and theme park.

La Estación Theme Park is composed of dancing fountains, the Old Railway Station Museum, fast food restaurants, the Locomotive Engine Monument, visitor attention office, Spring water Square, Furgón theater, Civic Plaza, Whistle Plaza and a Knowledge Cabús.

It consists of four showrooms. The first one functions as a gallery, in Showroom 2 the work of Manuel Manila Posada's colleague is usually shown. A third show room works as an exposition of the followers of this art. The last room is a library and contains about five thousand books, that include an important collection of poetry and theatre works.

== Old Train Station and Railway Museum ==
The museum consists of two buildings (old station and old loading warehouse) and wagons. The loading warehouse exhibits railway history in Aguascalientes: the working class wars, the mechanical workshop, the Mexican Revolution, the first trains, the history of locomotive engine No. 40, the opening of the workshops, the derailments, and the origins of the railway.

The museum is housed in four of the forty-eight huge departments, the oldest rooms that used to be part of the railway installations and which date from the end of the 19th century.

In the "La Estación" building are exhibited aspects of identity and culture. On the first floor there is a re-creation of a living room, a re-creation of the ticket offices, and pictures of the state's baseball team Los Rieleros, and of the city. On the second floor there is a telegraph office and another re-creation of a superintendent's office. It also includes an identity and culture show room where many railway personalities appear, such as Francisco López Medrano, best known as El Trainero, Ventura Salazar, Cornelio Cerecero Salazar, etc.
