= Museum of Contemporary Art (Aguascalientes) =

Contemporary Art Museum 'Number 8'
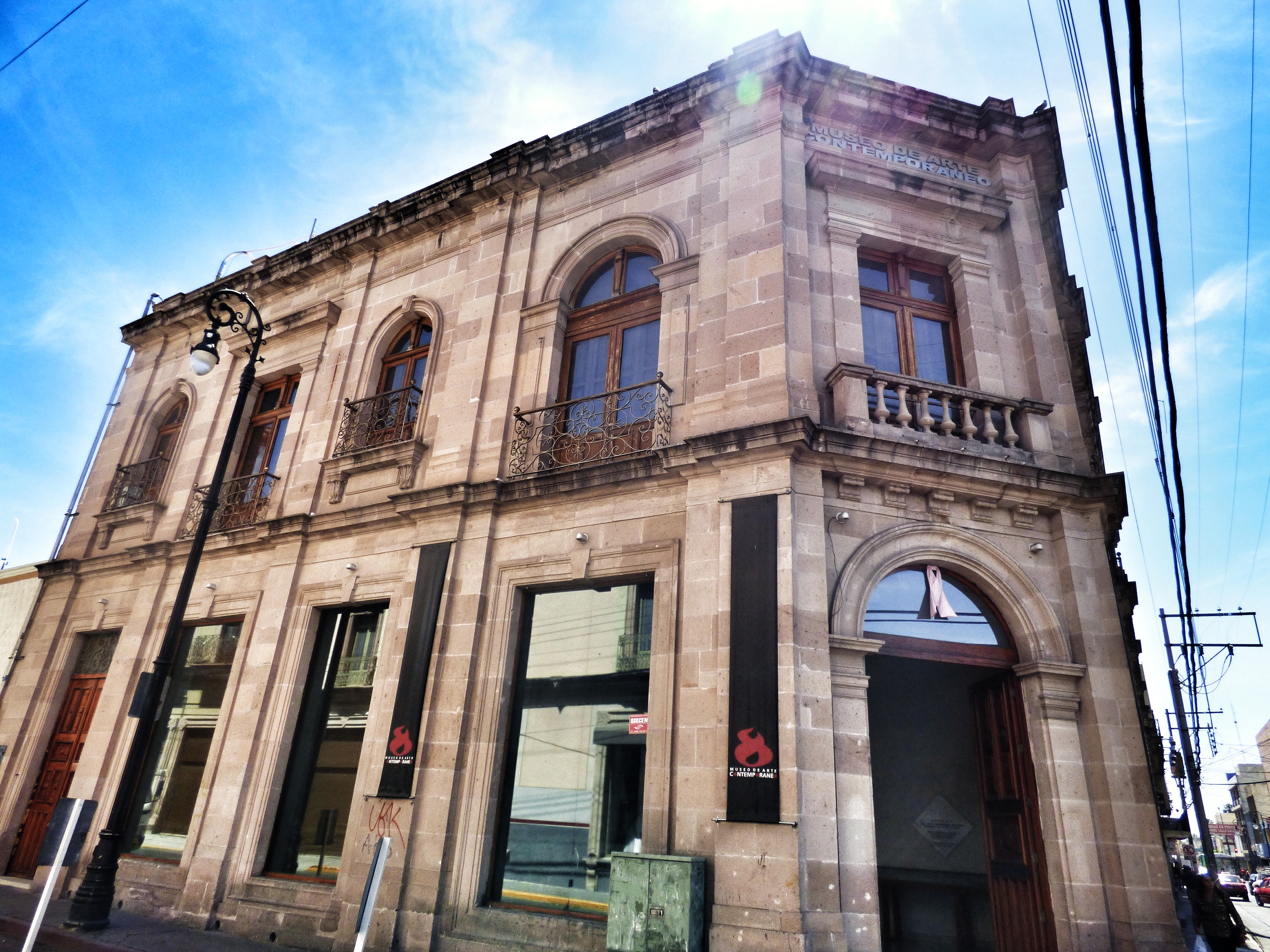
- Established: 14 April 1991
- Location: Aguascalientes, Mexico
- Coordinates: 21.8829°N 102.2949°W
- Architect: Refugio Reyes Rivas
- Location of Museum of Contemporary Art

The Aguascalientes Museum of Contemporary Art is an art gallery located in the city of Aguascalientes, Aguascalientes, Mexico and has 6 galleries.

In the "Jesús F. Contreras" gallery there are art works by contemporary Mexican artists. These were rewarded works from the Young Encounter of Arts; in another gallery is the work of Enrique Guzmán Villagómez, a recognized artist whose work is expressionist in nature. In the Arts Library gallery, there are works by photographers from a variety of backgrounds and styles.

In the first floor Saturnino Herrán gallery, temporary exhibitions by recognized Mexican and international artists are exhibited.

== History ==
The warehouse "El Número# 8" opened its doors in 1918. Since then, its location has been the corner of Morelos Street and Primo Verdad in the city of Aguascalientes. The name of the organization was decided because the rural state #8 used to be there in the street that was called Independencia, also because the new owner, José de Jesús Rábago, was born in the 8th day of the 8th month of 1888. Mr. Rábago acquire the rural state almost new due to its construction date that was in 1901.

The Museum of Contemporary Art was partially destroyed by fire during the seventies and hide-out of Revolutionary during the Civil War.
