= José Guadalupe Posada Museum =

Museum in Aguascalientes, Mexico

Museum of José Guadalupe Posada
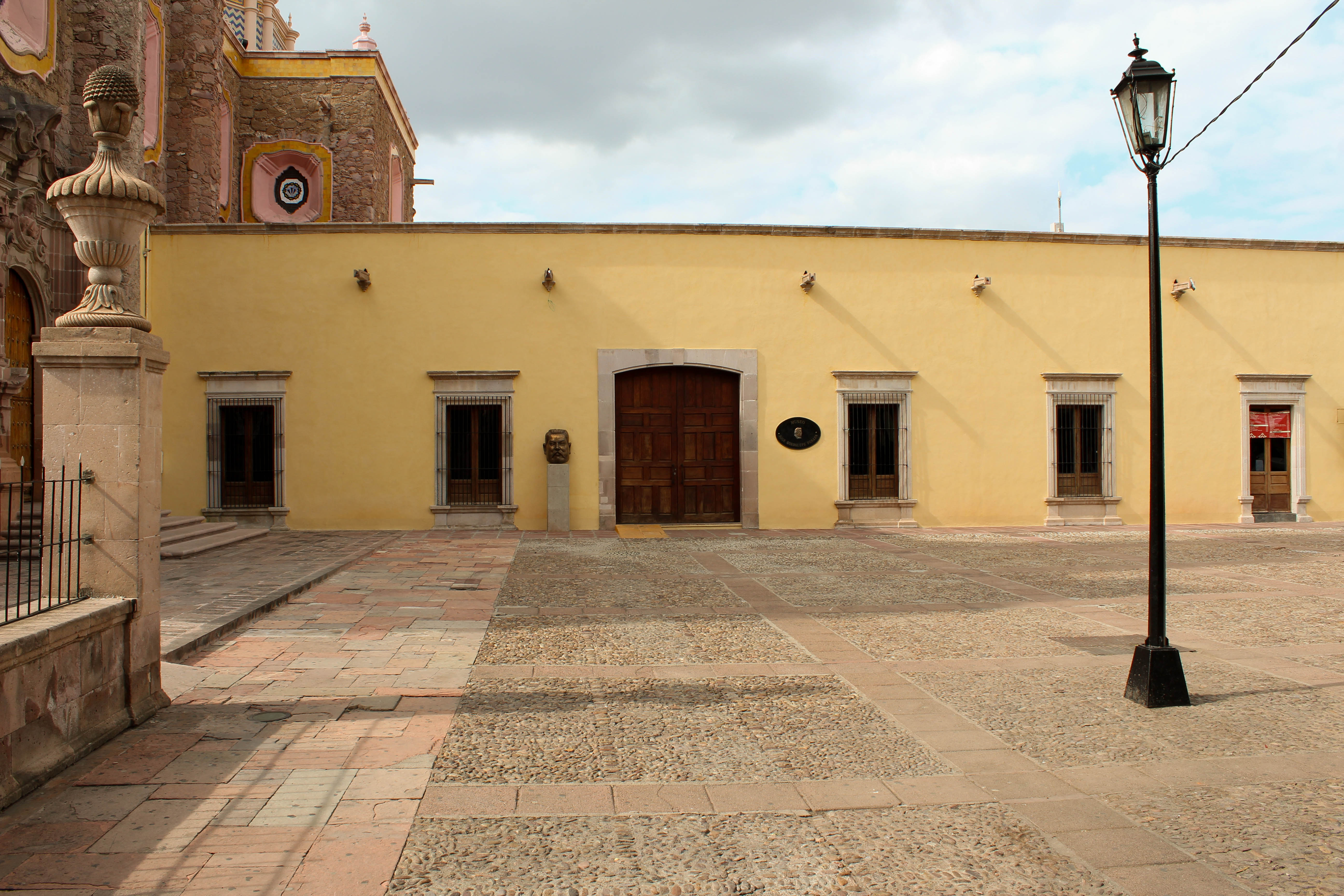
- Established: 16 September 1972
- Location: Mexico
- Coordinates: 21°52′31″N 102°17′34″W
- Website: www.aguascalientes.gob.mx/temas/cultura/espacios/museos/M_posada.aspx
- Location of José Guadalupe Posada Museum

The José Guadalupe Posada Museum is located in the Mexican city of Aguascalientes, capital of the State of Aguascalientes, and birthplace of the graphic artist José Guadalupe Posada. The museum displays the original signed printed plates with which he created his graphic images.

== The museum ==
The museum opened in 1972 and is run jointly by the state and federal governments. It is housed in what was the priest's cloisters and residence, in front of the gardens and a colonial fountain, and immediately next to the beautiful 18th century baroque Church of "El Señor del Encino" (Our Lord of the Oak, for a Black Crist made of live oak, worshiped in the church), in the Triana historic colonial neighbourhood. The museum is not large and there is no bookstore or gift shop.

It is possible to see the artist's hand at work on the plates, which brings a sense of immediacy to the viewer, and reaches across the centuries, putting the viewer in touch with the artist. One is struck by the small size of some of the plates, especially if one is familiar with his images, which are often re-printed monumentally. The museum itself features a few life-size cut-outs of some of his famous personages. It is a mark of the true excellence of his work that these small images, originally intended for newspaper or broadside publication, do not suffer by being blown up in size.

The collection features original plates for printing the broadsides, from its permanent collection, as well as changing exhibits of Posada's work. Also included in the collection are a number of extant broadsides which Posada created, his covers for a series of storybooks and song collections as well as engravings by a Posada predecessor, Manuel Manilla. There are two other galleries devoted to changing exhibits as well as a display of antique engraving equipment.
