= Teatro Aguascalientes =

Theater in México

Coordinates: 21.8571°N 102.2913°W

Aguascalientes Opera House
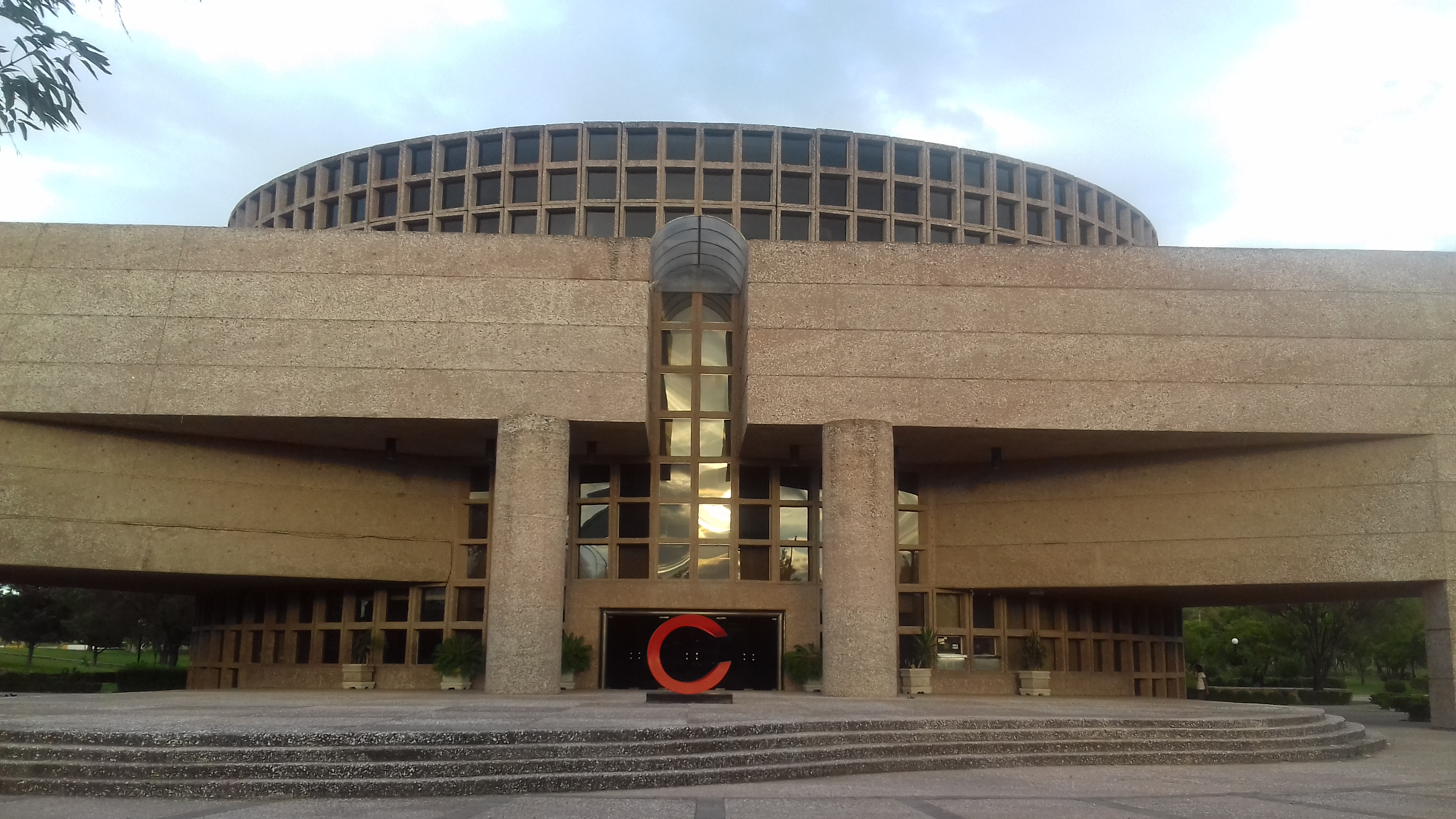
- Exterior of Teatro Aguascalientes
- Interactive map of the Aguascalientes Opera House area

General information
- Architectural style: Brutalism

The Teatro Aguascalientes or Aguascalientes Opera House is a theater which functions as the main opera house of the city of Aguascalientes in Mexico.

The modern-style building is the work of the architect Abraham Zabludowsky and features a majestic stage and an audience capacity of 1,650. This theater opened its doors to the public on 16 August 1991, with the performance of an operetta. It is considered to be the largest stage for the promotion of art and culture in the city. During the national fair of San Marcos, this venue is host to the folk culture spectacle known as "ferial". The opera house also hosts classical music concerts, popular music, theater plays, ballet, and other shows.

The theater is situated in its own grounds, which include a parking lot for 300 vehicles, and spacious gardens. Entry to the opera house is through a foyer, characterized by its cylindrical columns. The audience seating is on two floors, the upper of which consists of a gallery and six theater boxes, each with the capacity for six spectators. The total capacity of the house is 1,650 people. It is equipped with air conditioning, sound, and digitally controlled lighting.

The stage is 49.2 feet (15.0 m) in width and 42.6 feet (13.0 m) in depth, and its facilities are comparable with those of the most sophisticated theaters.

== Gallery ==
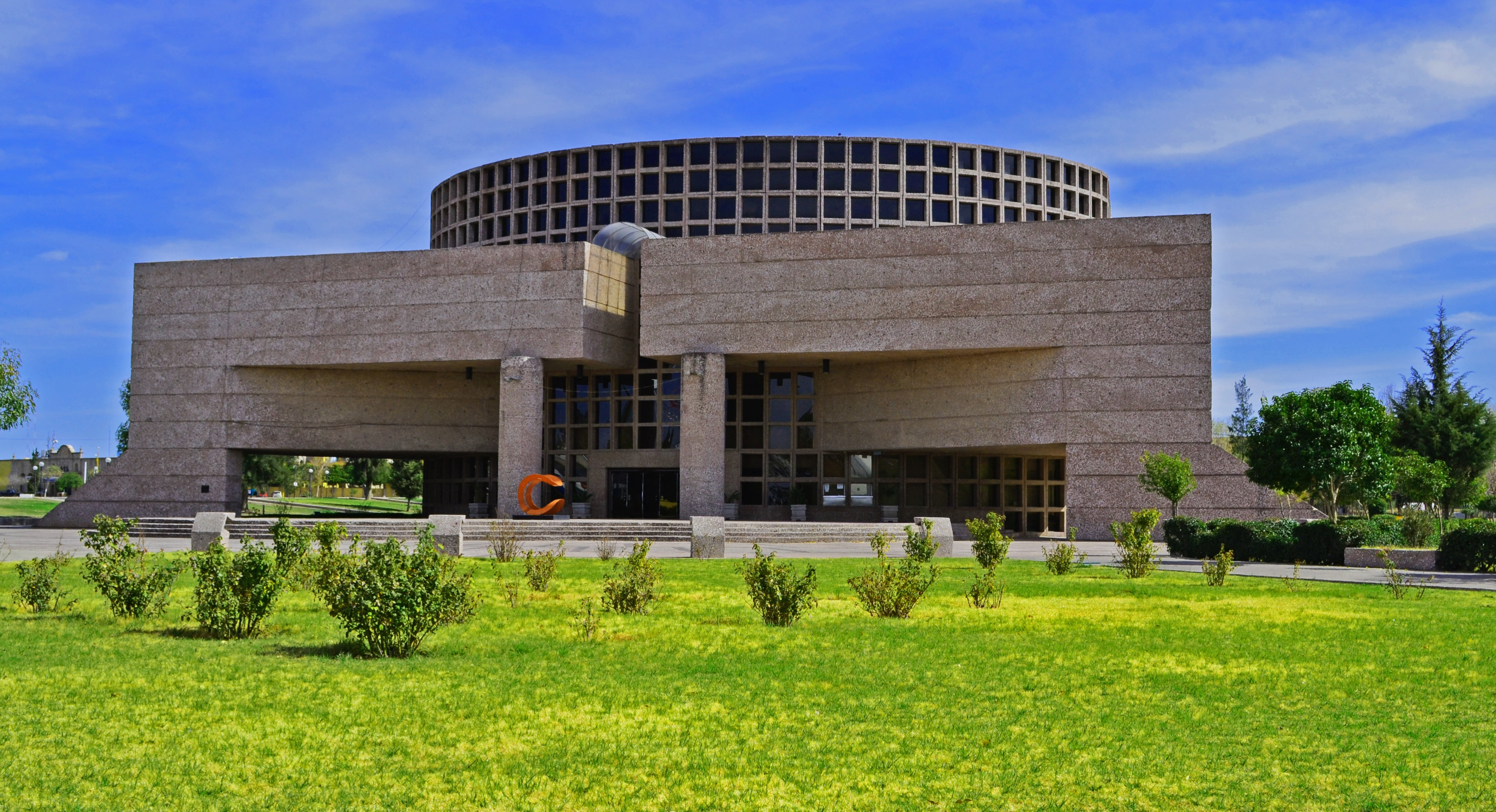
Exterior of Teatro Aguascalientes (2012)

A ferial performance at Teatro Aguascalientes (2023)

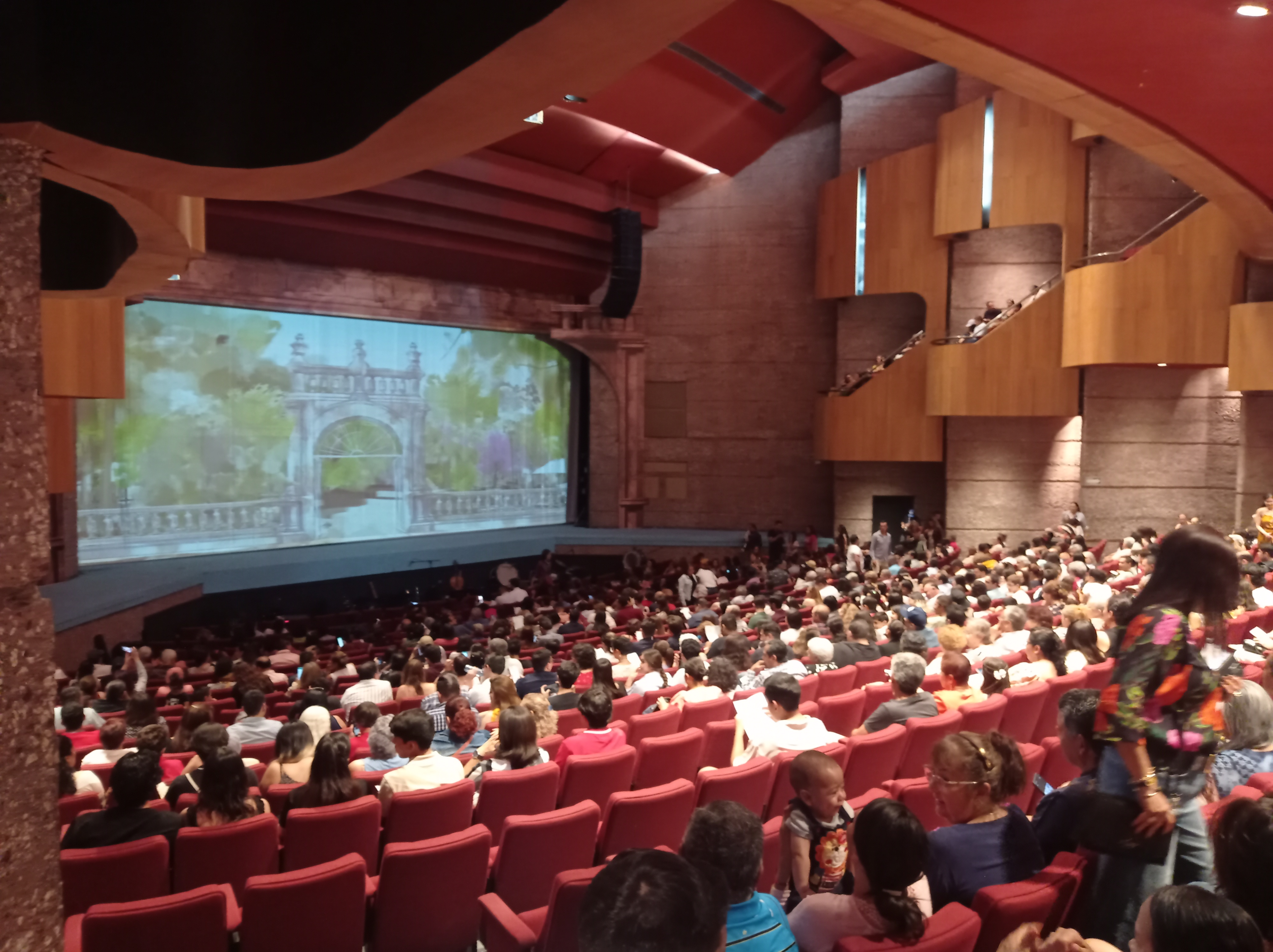
Interior of Teatro Aguascalientes (2023)

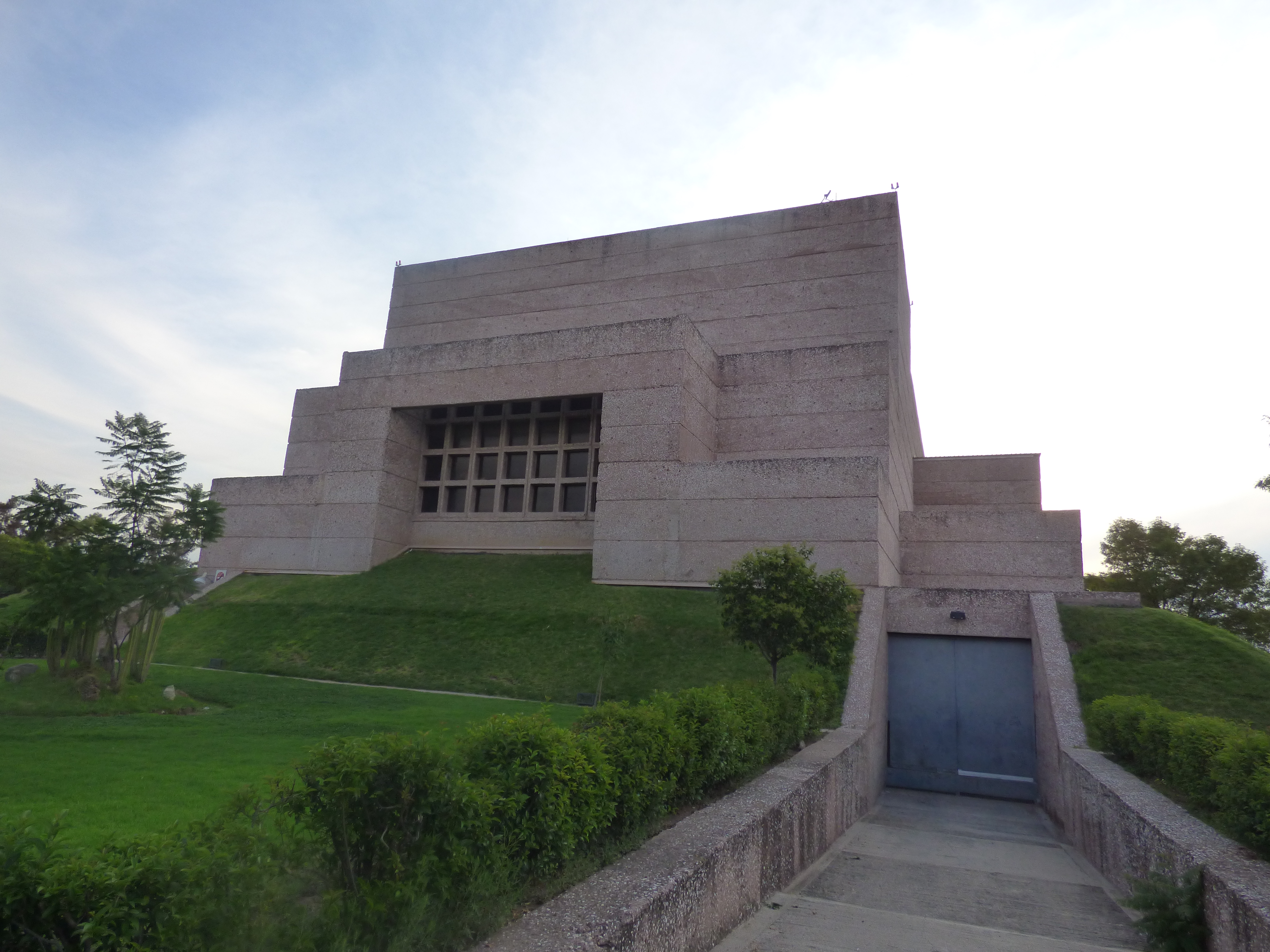
Back entrance into Teatro Aguascalientes (2016)

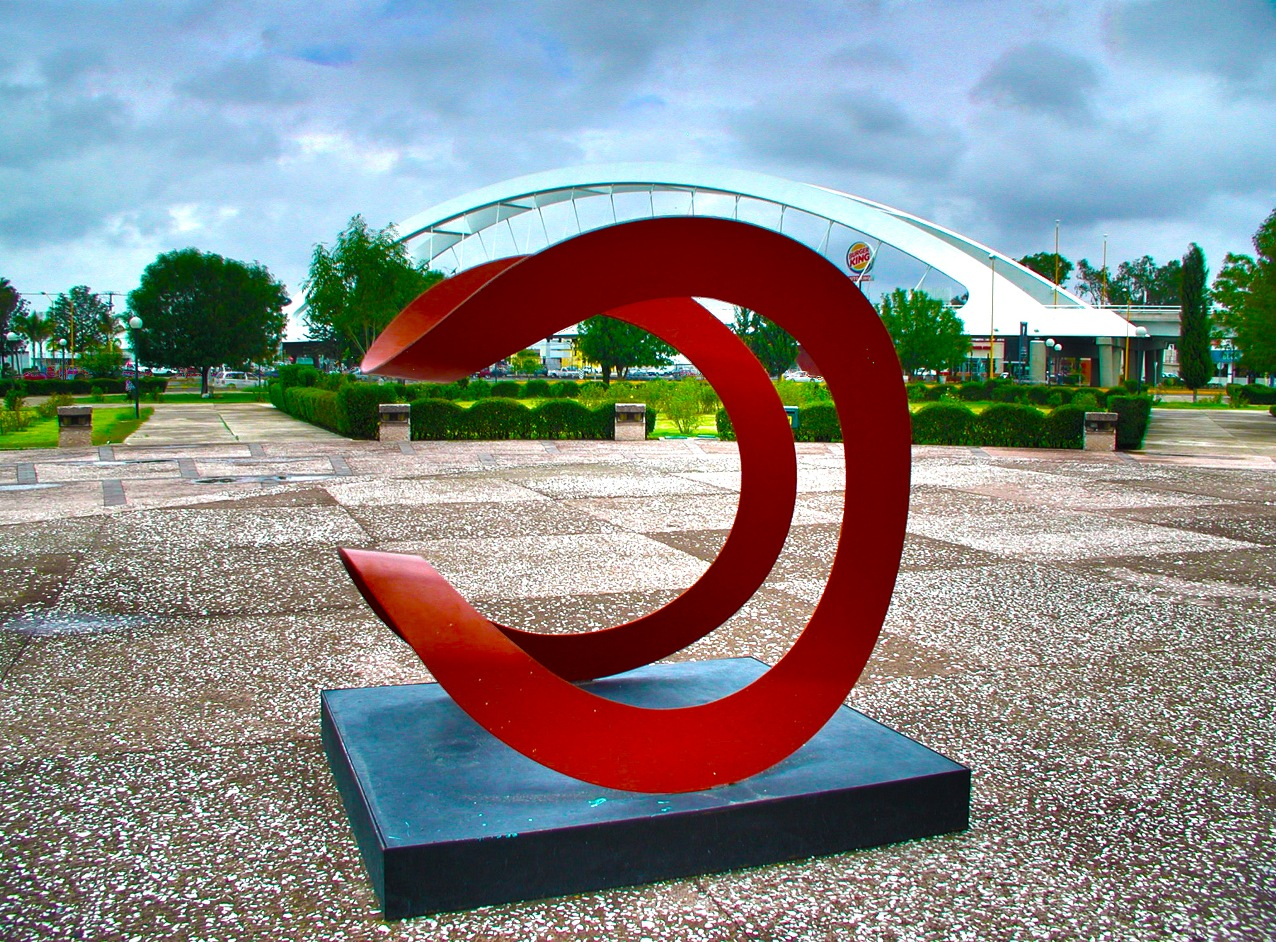
Sculpture decorating the entrance of Teatro Aguascalientes
